= List of members of the European Parliament for France, 2004–2009 =

Members of the European Parliament from France
ECSC delegation	(1952)
EP delegation	(1958)
1st term	(1979)
2nd term	(1984)
3rd term	(1989)
4th term	(1994)
5th term	(1999)
6th term	(2004)
7th term	(2009)
8th term	(2014)
9th term	(2019)
10th term	(2024)

This is a list of members of the European Parliament for France in the 2004 to 2009 session, ordered by name.

See 2004 European Parliament election in France for a list ordered by constituency.

== List ==
Name	National party	EP Group	Constituency
Kader Arif	Socialist Party	PES	South-West
Marie-Hélène Aubert	The Greens	G–EFA	West
Jean-Pierre Audy	Union for a Popular Movement	EPP–ED	Massif-central–Centre
Jean Marie Beaupuy	Union for French Democracy / Democratic Movement	ALDE	East
Jean-Luc Bennahmias	The Greens / Democratic Movement	G–EFA	South-East
Pervenche Berès	Socialist Party	PES	Île-de-France
Guy Bono	Socialist Party	PES	South-East
Catherine Boursier	Socialist Party	PES	East
Marie-Arlette Carlotti	Socialist Party	PES	South-East
Françoise Castex	Socialist Party	PES	South-West
Jean-Marie Cavada	Union for French Democracy / Civic Alliance for Democracy in Europe	ALDE	South-West
Thierry Cornillet	Union for French Democracy / Democratic Movement	ALDE	South-East
Jean-Louis Cottigny	Socialist Party	PES	North-West
Paul-Marie Coûteaux	Movement for France	IND&DEM	Île-de-France
Joseph Daul	Union for a Popular Movement	EPP–ED	East
Jean-Paul Denanot	Socialist Party	PES	Massif-central–Centre
Marie-Hélène Descamps	Union for a Popular Movement	EPP–ED	Massif-central–Centre
Harlem Désir	Socialist Party	PES	Île-de-France
Brigitte Douay	Socialist Party	PES	North-West
Anne Ferreira	Socialist Party	PES	Île-de-France
Hélène Flautre	The Greens	G–EFA	North-West
Nicole Fontaine	Union for a Popular Movement	EPP–ED	Île-de-France
Brigitte Fouré	Union for French Democracy / New Centre	EPP–ED	North-West
Janelly Fourtou	Union for French Democracy / Civic Alliance for Democracy in Europe	ALDE	Massif-central–Centre
Patrick Gaubert	Union for a Popular Movement	EPP–ED	Île-de-France
Jean-Paul Gauzès	Union for a Popular Movement	EPP–ED	North-West
Claire Gibault	Union for French Democracy / Civic Alliance for Democracy in Europe	ALDE	South-East
Bruno Gollnisch	National Front	NI	East
Madeleine de Grandmaison	Communist Party (Alliance of the Overseas)	EUL–NGL	Overseas territories
Natalie Griesbeck	Union for French Democracy / Democratic Movement	ALDE	East
Françoise Grossetête	Union for a Popular Movement	EPP–ED	South-East
Ambroise Guellec	Union for a Popular Movement	EPP–ED	West
Catherine Guy-Quint	Socialist Party	PES	Massif-central–Centre
Benoît Hamon	Socialist Party	PES	East
Jacky Henin	Communist Party	EUL–NGL	North-West
Brice Hortefeux	Union for a Popular Movement	EPP–ED	Massif-central–Centre
Marie-Anne Isler-Béguin	The Greens	G–EFA	East
André Laignel	Socialist Party	PES	Massif-central–Centre
Alain Lamassoure	Union for a Popular Movement	EPP–ED	South-West
Carl Lang	National Front	NI	North-West
Anne Laperrouze	Union for French Democracy / Democratic Movement	ALDE	South-West
Stéphane Le Foll	Socialist Party	PES	West
Roselyne Lefrançois	Socialist Party	PES	West
Jean-Marie Le Pen	National Front	NI	South-East
Marine Le Pen	National Front	NI	Île-de-France
Fernand Le Rachinel	National Front	NI	North-West
Bernard Lehideux	Union for French Democracy / Democratic Movement	ALDE	Île-de-France
Marie-Noëlle Lienemann	Socialist Party	PES	North-West
Alain Lipietz	The Greens	G–EFA	Île-de-France
Patrick Louis	Movement for France	IND&DEM	South-East
Jean-Claude Martinez	National Front	NI	South-West
Véronique Mathieu	Union for a Popular Movement	EPP–ED	East
Philippe Morillon	Union for French Democracy / Democratic Movement	ALDE	West
Élisabeth Morin-Chartier	Union for a Popular Movement	EPP–ED	West
Catherine Néris	Socialist Party	PES	Overseas territories
Gérard Onesta	The Greens	G–EFA	South-East
Béatrice Patrie	Socialist Party	PES	South-West
Vincent Peillon	Socialist Party	PES	North-West
Pierre Pribetich	Socialist Party	PES	East
Bernard Poignant	Socialist Party	PES	West
Michel Rocard	Socialist Party	PES	South-East
Martine Roure	Socialist Party	PES	South-East
Tokia Saïfi	Union for a Popular Movement	EPP–ED	North-West
Marielle de Sarnez	Union for French Democracy / Democratic Movement	ALDE	Île-de-France
Gilles Savary	Socialist Party	PES	Île-de-France
Pierre Schapira	Socialist Party	PES	Île-de-France
Lydia Schenardi	National Front	NI	South-East
Margie Sudre	Union for a Popular Movement	EPP–ED	Overseas territories
Jacques Toubon	Union for a Popular Movement	EPP–ED	Île-de-France
Catherine Trautmann	Socialist Party	PES	East
Ari Vatanen	Union for a Popular Movement	EPP–ED	South-East
Yannick Vaugrenard	Socialist Party	PES	West
Bernadette Vergnaud	Socialist Party	PES	West
Christine de Veyrac	Union for a Popular Movement	EPP–ED	South-West
Philippe de Villiers	Movement for France	IND&DEM	West
Dominique Vlasto	Union for a Popular Movement	EPP–ED	South-East
Michel Teychenné	Socialist Party	PES	South-West
Henri Weber	Socialist Party	PES	North-West
Francis Wurtz	Communist Party	EUL–NGL	Île-de-France
