= List of members of the European Parliament for France, 2009–2014 =

Members of the European Parliament from France
ECSC delegation	(1952)
EP delegation	(1958)
1st term	(1979)
2nd term	(1984)
3rd term	(1989)
4th term	(1994)
5th term	(1999)
6th term	(2004)
7th term	(2009)
8th term	(2014)
9th term	(2019)
10th term	(2024)

This is a list of members of the European Parliament for France in the 2009 to 2014 session, ordered by name.

See 2009 European Parliament election in France for further information on the election.

== List ==
Name	National party	EP Group	Constituency
Sandrine Bélier	Europe Ecology	G–EFA	East France
Arnaud Danjean	Union for a Popular Movement	EPP	East France
Joseph Daul	Union for a Popular Movement	EPP	East France
Bruno Gollnisch	National Front	NI	East France
Nathalie Griesbeck	Democratic Movement	ALDE	East France
Liêm Hoang-Ngoc	Socialist Party	S&D	East France
Véronique Mathieu	Union for a Popular Movement	EPP	East France
Michèle Striffler	Modern Left	EPP	East France
Catherine Trautmann	Socialist Party	S&D	East France
Rachida Dati	Union for a Popular Movement	EPP	Île-de-France
Jean-Marie Cavada	Union for a Popular Movement (New Centre)	EPP	Île-de-France
Marielle Gallo	Modern Left	EPP	Île-de-France
Philippe Juvin	Union for a Popular Movement	EPP	Île-de-France
Constance Le Grip	Union for a Popular Movement	EPP	Île-de-France
Daniel Cohn-Bendit	Europe Ecology (The Greens)	G–EFA	Île-de-France
Eva Joly	Europe Ecology	G–EFA	Île-de-France
Pascal Canfin	Europe Ecology	G–EFA	Île-de-France
Karima Delli	Europe Ecology	G–EFA	Île-de-France
Harlem Désir	Socialist Party	S&D	Île-de-France
Pervenche Berès	Socialist Party	S&D	Île-de-France
Marielle de Sarnez	Democratic Movement	ALDE	Île-de-France
Patrick Le Hyaric	Left Front (Communist Party)	EUL–NGL	Île-de-France
Jean-Pierre Audy	Union for a Popular Movement	EPP	Massif Central-Centre
Sophie Briard-Auconie	Union for a Popular Movement–New Centre	EPP	Massif Central-Centre
Brice Hortefeux	Union for a Popular Movement	EPP	Massif Central-Centre
Henri Weber	Socialist Party	S&D	Massif Central-Centre
Jean-Paul Besset	Europe Ecology	G–EFA	Massif Central-Centre
Dominique Riquet	Union for a Popular Movement–Radical	EPP	North-West France
Tokia Saïfi	Union for a Popular Movement–Radical	EPP	North-West France
Philippe Boulland	Union for a Popular Movement	EPP	North-West France
Jean-Paul Gauzès	Union for a Popular Movement	EPP	North-West France
Gilles Pargneaux	Socialist Party	S&D	North-West France
Estelle Grelier	Socialist Party	S&D	North-West France
Hélène Flautre	Europe Ecology (The Greens)	G–EFA	North-West France
Marine Le Pen	National Front	NI	North-West France
Corinne Lepage	Democratic Movement	ALDE	North-West France
Jacky Hénin	Left Front (Communist Party)	EUL–NGL	North-West France
Maurice Ponga	Union for a Popular Movement–The Rally	EPP	Overseas territories
Younous Omarjee	Alliance of the Overseas (Communist Party of Réunion)	EUL–NGL	Overseas territories
Patrice Tirolien	Socialist Party	S&D	Overseas territories
Françoise Grossetête	Union for a Popular Movement	EPP	South-East
Damien Abad	Union for a Popular Movement–New Centre	EPP	South-East
Dominique Vlasto	Union for a Popular Movement	EPP	South-East
Gaston Franco	Union for a Popular Movement	EPP	South-East
Michel Dantin	Union for a Popular Movement	EPP	South-East
Michèle Rivasi	Europe Ecology (The Greens)	G–EFA	South-East
François Alfonsi	Party of the Corsican Nation	G–EFA	South-East
Malika Benarab-Attou	Europe Ecology	G–EFA	South-East
Vincent Peillon	Socialist Party	S&D	South-East
Sylvie Guillaume	Socialist Party	S&D	South-East
Jean-Marie Le Pen	National Front	NI	South-East
Jean-Luc Bennahmias	Democratic Movement	ALDE	South-East
Marie-Christine Vergiat	Left Front (Miscellaneous Left)	EUL–NGL	South-East
Franck Proust	Union for a Popular Movement	EPP	South-West
Christine de Veyrac	Union for a Popular Movement	EPP	South-West
Alain Lamassoure	Union for a Popular Movement	EPP	South-West
Marie-Thérèse Sanchez-Schmidt	Union for a Popular Movement–Radical	EPP	South-West
Kader Arif	Socialist Party	S&D	South-West
Françoise Castex	Socialist Party	S&D	South-West
José Bové	Europe Ecology	G–EFA	South-West
Catherine Grèze	Europe Ecology	G–EFA	South-West
Robert Rochefort	Democratic Movement	ALDE	South-West
Jean-Luc Mélenchon	Left Front (Left Party)	EUL–NGL	South-West
Agnès Le Brun	Union for a Popular Movement	EPP	West
Élisabeth Morin	Union for a Popular Movement	EPP	West
Alain Cadec	Union for a Popular Movement	EPP	West
Bernadette Vergnaud	Socialist Party	S&D	West
Stéphane Le Foll	Socialist Party	S&D	West
Yannick Jadot	Europe Ecology	G–EFA	West
Nicole Kiil-Nielsen	Europe Ecology	G–EFA	West
Philippe de Villiers	Libertas (MPF)	EFD	West
Sylvie Goulard	Democratic Movement	ALDE	West

=== Elected by the National Assembly ===
The Treaty of Lisbon adopted in 2009 gave two additional seats to France. But unlike the other concerned countries, France did not elect these future MEPs during the 2009 election. The Government decided instead that they would be elected indirectly by the National Assembly. The 6 December, the deputies Jean Roatta and Yves Cochet were elected, one from the majority and the other from the opposition. Cochet's election gives more MEPs to the ecologists (15) than to the socialists (14), despite having received less popular votes.

Name	National party	EP Group
Jean Roatta	Union for a Popular Movement	EPP
Yves Cochet	Europe Ecology	G–EFA
