= List of members of the European Parliament for France, 2024–2029 =

Members of the European Parliament from France
ECSC delegation	(1952)
EP delegation	(1958)
1st term	(1979)
2nd term	(1984)
3rd term	(1989)
4th term	(1994)
5th term	(1999)
6th term	(2004)
7th term	(2009)
8th term	(2014)
9th term	(2019)
10th term	(2024)

This is a list of the 81 members of the European Parliament for France in the 2024 to 2029 session. The members were elected in the 2024 European Parliament election in France.

== List ==
Name	National party	EP Group	Ref.
Jordan Bardella (Note: RN 2024 list leader.)	National Rally (RN)	PfE	
Malika Sorel	National Rally (RN)	PfE	
Fabrice Leggeri	National Rally (RN)	PfE	
Mathilde Androuët	National Rally (RN)	PfE	
Jean-Paul Garraud	National Rally (RN)	PfE	
Mélanie Disdier	National Rally (RN)	PfE	
Matthieu Valet	National Rally (RN)	PfE	
Anne-Sophie Frigout	National Rally (RN)	PfE	
Thierry Mariani	National Rally (RN)	PfE	
Pascale Piera	National Rally (RN)	PfE	
Philippe Olivier	National Rally (RN)	PfE	
Marie-Luce Brasier-Clain	National Rally (RN)	PfE	
Alexandre Varaut	National Rally (RN)	PfE	
Catherine Griset	National Rally (RN)	PfE	
Gilles Pennelle	National Rally (RN)	PfE	
Virginie Joron	National Rally (RN)	PfE	
Julien Sanchez	National Rally (RN)	PfE	
Julie Rechagneux	National Rally (RN)	PfE	
Aleksandar Nikolic	National Rally (RN)	PfE	
Valérie Deloge	National Rally (RN)	PfE	
Rody Tolassy	National Rally (RN)	PfE	
Marie Dauchy	National Rally (RN)	PfE	
Pierre-Romain Thionnet	National Rally (RN)	PfE	
Pierre Pimpie	National Rally (RN)	PfE	
Séverine Werbrouck (Note: Replacement for Sylvie Josserand after her resignation.)	National Rally (RN)	PfE	
Julien Leonardelli	National Rally (RN)	PfE	
Angéline Furet	National Rally (RN)	PfE	
Christophe Bay (Note: Replacement for Gaëtan Dussausaye after his resignation.)	National Rally (RN)	PfE	
France Jamet	National Rally (RN)	PfE	
André Rougé (Note: Replacement for Nathaly Antona after her death.)	National Rally (RN)	PfE	
Valérie Hayer (Note: Ensemble 2024 list leader, chairwoman of Renew Europe.)	Renaissance (RE)	RE	
Pascal Canfin	Renaissance (RE)	RE	
Fabienne Keller	Renaissance (RE)	RE	
Stéphanie Yon-Courtin	Renaissance (RE)	RE	
Jérémy Decerle (Note: Replacement for Marie-Pierre Vedrenne after her resignation.)	Renaissance (RE)	RE	
Laurence Farreng	Democratic Movement (MoDem)	RE	
Christophe Grudler	Democratic Movement (MoDem)	RE	
Sandro Gozi	Democratic Movement (MoDem)	RE	
Nathalie Loiseau	Horizons	RE	
Gilles Boyer	Horizons	RE	
Valérie Devaux	Union of Democrats and Independents (UDI)	RE	
Bernard Guetta	Independent	RE	
Grégory Allione	Independent	RE	
Nora Mebarek	Socialist Party (PS)	S&D	
Pierre Jouvet	Socialist Party (PS)	S&D	
Christophe Clergeau	Socialist Party (PS)	S&D	
Murielle Laurent	Socialist Party (PS)	S&D	
Jean-Marc Germain	Socialist Party (PS)	S&D	
Emma Rafowicz	Socialist Party (PS)	S&D	
Chloé Ridel	Socialist Party (PS)	S&D	
Éric Sargiacomo	Socialist Party (PS)	S&D	
Claire Fita	Socialist Party (PS)	S&D	
François Kalfon	Socialist Party (PS)	S&D	
Raphaël Glucksmann (Note: PS – PP 2024 list leader.)	Place Publique (PP)	S&D	
Aurore Lalucq	Place Publique (PP)	S&D	
Thomas Pellerin-Carlin	Place Publique (PP)	S&D	
Manon Aubry (Note: LFI 2024 list leader, GUE/NGL co-leader.)	La France Insoumise (LFI)	GUE–NGL	
Younous Omarjee	La France Insoumise (LFI)	GUE–NGL	
Marina Mesure	La France Insoumise (LFI)	GUE–NGL	
Anthony Smith	La France Insoumise (LFI)	GUE–NGL	
Leïla Chaibi	La France Insoumise (LFI)	GUE–NGL	
Arash Saeidi	La France Insoumise (LFI)	GUE–NGL	
Rima Hassan	La France Insoumise (LFI)	GUE–NGL	
Damien Carême	La France Insoumise (LFI)	GUE–NGL	
Emma Fourreau	La France Insoumise (LFI)	GUE–NGL	
François-Xavier Bellamy (Note: LR 2024 list leader.)	The Republicans (LR)	EPP	
Céline Imart	The Republicans (LR)	EPP	
Christophe Gomart	The Republicans (LR)	EPP	
Isabelle Le Callennec	The Republicans (LR)	EPP	
Nadine Morano	The Republicans (LR)	EPP	
Laurent Castillo	Union of the Right for the Republic (UDR)	PfE	
Marie Toussaint (Note: LE 2024 list leader.)	The Ecologists (LE)	Greens/EFA	
David Cormand	The Ecologists (LE)	Greens/EFA	
Mélissa Camara	The Ecologists (LE)	Greens/EFA	
Mounir Satouri	The Ecologists (LE)	Greens/EFA	
Majdouline Sbaï	The Ecologists (LE)	Greens/EFA	
Sarah Knafo	Reconquête (R!)	ESN	
Guillaume Peltier	Identity-Liberties (IDL) (Note: Elected on the Reconquête list.)	ECR	
Marion Maréchal (Note: Reconquête 2024 list leader.)	Identity-Liberties (IDL)	ECR	
Nicolas Bay	Identity-Liberties (IDL)	ECR	
Laurence Trochu	Identity-Liberties (IDL)	ECR	

== Replaced members ==
Name	National party	Notes	Ref.
Nathaly Antona	National Rally (RN)	Died before taking office.	
Gaëtan Dussausaye	National Rally (RN)	Elected to the National Assembly.	
Sylvie Josserand	National Rally (RN)	Elected to the National Assembly.	
Marie-Pierre Vedrenne	Renaissance (RE)	Appointed minister delegate to the Interior Minister.	
