= European Parliament constituencies in France =

Former European Parliament constituencies

France
- European Parliament constituency
- Location among the current constituencies
- Member state: France
- Created: 1979
- MEPs: 81 (as of 2024)

From 2004 to 2019, there were eight European Parliament constituencies in France. Since the 2019 European Parliament election, there has been a single constituency covering the whole country.

The constituencies all used the party-list proportional representation with the highest average method from their creation to their abolition. French citizens living abroad were added to the Île-de-France constituency in 2014.

The table below shows the changes to France's European Parliament constituencies over time, listing the numbers of Members of the European Parliament each elected at each European Parliamentary election.

Election	Constituencies								Total seats
	France								
1979	81								81
1984	81								81
1989	81								81
1994	87								87
1999	87								87
	North-West	West	East	South-West	South-East	Massif central–Centre	Île-de-France	Overseas	
2004	12	10	10	10	13	6	14	3	78
2009	10	9	9	10	13	5	13	3	72 (Note: Following the ratification of the Treaty of Lisbon by France on 14 February 2008, and entering into application on 1 December 2009 (after the last instruments were deposited by Italy, too late for the 2009 European elections), 2 additional seats were assigned to France and were finally appointed by the French Parliament in 2011.)
2014	10	9	9	10	13	5	15 (Note: The 2 additional seats for the elections in 2014, previously appointed by the French Parliament, were finally assigned to the Île-de-France constituency as it was enlarged in 2014 to include also the votes for French citizens living abroad (and not registered for the European elections in another member state of the European Union).)	3	74
	France								
2019	74 (Note: France gained 5 seats, bringing it to a total of 79, following the departure of the UK from the EU.)								74
2024	81								81

European Parliament constituencies in France 2004-2019 (seat numbers effective from 2014).
