= Party of France =

French nationalist party

Party of France Parti de la France
- President: Thomas Joly
- Founder: Carl Lang
- Founded: 23 February 2009; 17 years ago
- Split from: National Front
- Headquarters: 43 route de Saint-Germain 78860, Saint-Nom-la-Bretèche
- Ideology: Identitarianism; Ultranationalism; Social conservatism
- Political position: Far-right
- Colours: Blue and red
- National Assembly: 0 / 577
- Senate: 0 / 348
- European Parliament: 0 / 74

Website
- www.parti-de-la-france.fr

The Party of France (French: Parti de la France, PDF) is a political party in France. The PDF was founded on 23 February 2009 by National Front MEP Carl Lang. Carl Lang was known for his opposition to Marine Le Pen's possible candidacy to the leadership of the FN upon retirement of its long-time leader, Jean-Marie Le Pen. This came in the midst of the early campaign for the 2009 European elections: Carl Lang, elected for the FN in the North-West constituency ran for re-election under the PDF banner, against the FN list led by Marine Le Pen. The PDF supported Jean Verdon in the Massif Central-Centre and the incumbent MEP Jean-Claude Martinez in the South-West constituency. The party ran no lists against Jean-Marie Le Pen and Bruno Gollnisch.

The PDF was joined by a number of high-ranking FN elected officials and members, including Fernand Le Rachinel and Bernard Antony. After defections from the FN, it had regional councillors in the Nord-Pas-de-Calais, Picardy, Lower Normandy, Ile-de-France and Centre regions.

In the 2009 European elections, all lists supported by the PDF were defeated, with 1.88% in the Massif Central, 1.52% in the North-West and 0.92% in the South-West. Carl Lang, Fernand Le Rachinel and Jean-Claude Martinez were defeated.

In November 2009, Carl Lang announced that he would be a candidate in the 2010 regional elections in Upper Normandy. In addition, the party announced that it would run in at least eight regions. It did not win any seats

On 25 June 2024, During the 2024 French legislative election. Pascal Schneider, mayor of Neuves-Maisons, filed a complaint with the public prosecutor against Pierre-Nicolas Nups, candidate of the PDF in Meurthe-et-Moselle's 5th constituency, for electoral posters featuring a young white boy with blue eyes and blonde hair reading "Let's give white children a future."
