= Ensemble (political coalition) =

Political coalition in France

Together for the Republic Ensemble pour la République
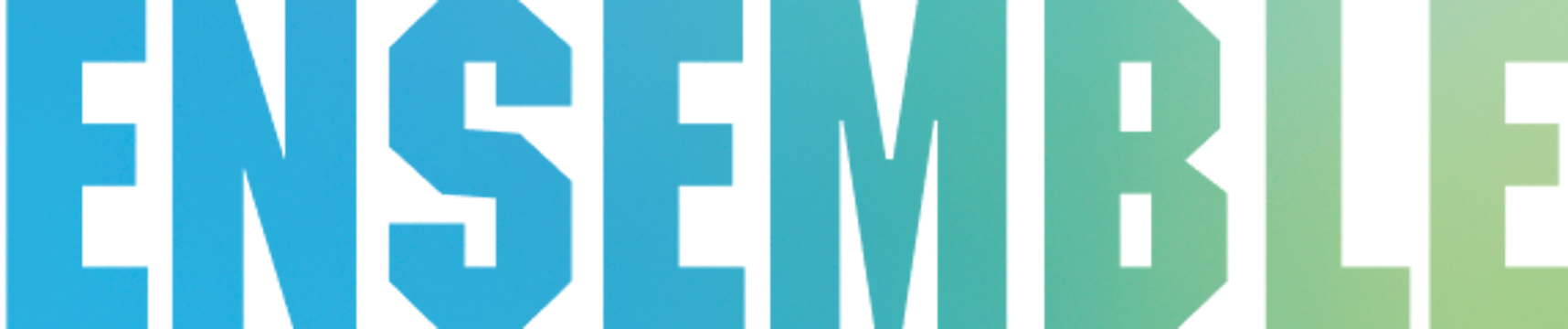
- Leader: Gabriel Attal (RE)
- Secretary-General: Stanislas Guerini (RE)
- Vice Presidents: François Bayrou (MoDem); Édouard Philippe (Horizons)
- Founded: 2019; 7 years ago (as Renaissance); 29 November 2021; 4 years ago (as Ensemble Citoyens)
- Ideology: Liberalism
- Political position: Centre to centre-right
- Colours: Azure-to-chartreuse gradient (Note: as Ensemble pour la République); Black (Note: as Ensemble); Yellow (customary)
- National Assembly: 159 / 577
- Senate: 46 / 348
- European Parliament: 13 / 79

Website
- ensemble-2024.fr

Ensemble (lit. 'Together', stylised in all caps), known in full as Ensemble pour la République (Together for the Republic), is a liberal political coalition in France created by Emmanuel Macron. Formed in November 2021 as Ensemble Citoyens, it makes up the presidential majority and includes Renaissance (RE, formerly known as En Marche and La République En Marche!), Democratic Movement (MoDem), Horizons, En Commun, and the Progressive Federation. The coalition included the parties Agir and Territories of Progress (TDP) until they were merged into the rebranded Renaissance. Ensemble has mainly been described as being centrist or as centre-right on the political spectrum.

After the 2022 French legislative election, the coalition won a plurality of seats but lost its majority in the National Assembly. In 2024, they were reduced further into third place in terms of votes but second in seats.

== History ==
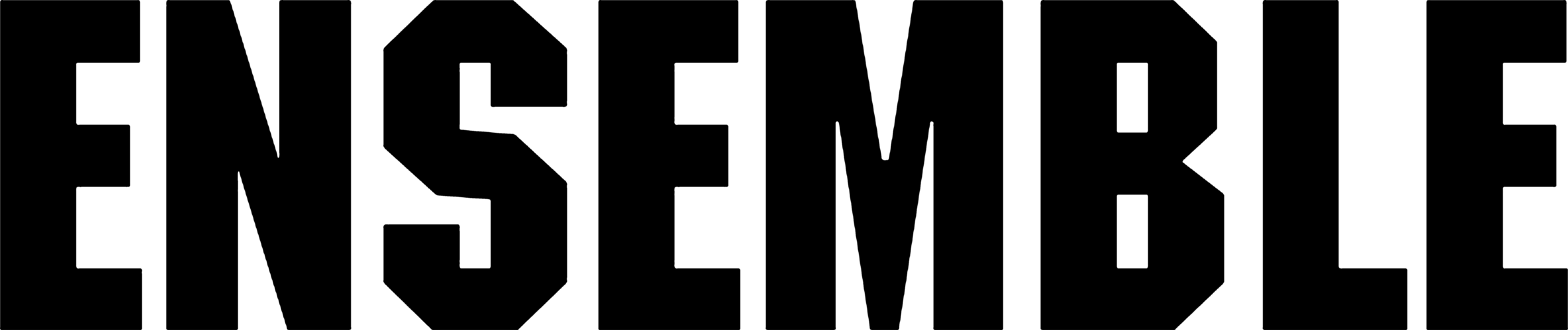
Alternative logo for Ensemble

On 17 December 2017, at the congress of the Democratic Movement (MoDem), Christophe Castaner said he supported an "enlarged list" for the European elections based on their alliance, and on 26 September 2018, the movement officially announced the opening of applications for prospective candidates from civil society, receiving 2,673 in total, winnowed by an investiture committee chaired by Jean-Marc Borello. Former Élysée advisor Stéphane Séjourné was designated campaign director on 29 October, tasked with creating a list alongside Agir, and seeking a lead candidate with a "green profile". For the MoDem, Bayrou selected Régis Lefebvre to serve as deputy campaign director.

In March 2019, Les Échos reported that the choice of lead candidate was to be made internally between either health minister Agnès Buzyn or European affairs minister Nathalie Loiseau. Loiseau officially announced she would seek the nomination for lead candidate following her debate with Marine Le Pen on the set of L'Émission politique on 14 March, while Les Échos and Le Parisien later reported that Buzyn withdrew her name from consideration. Loiseau was officially designated as lead candidate on 26 March as the list of the first 30 candidates was unveiled. Alain Juppé was the subject of early speculation regarding his potential candidacy to lead the list, though confirmed on 19 March 2018 that he would not stand, and his appointment to the Constitutional Council precluded his participation in the campaign, but he indicated he would have supported Macron's list.

LaREM was expected to sign a cooperation agreement with the ALDE group for the 2019 European Parliament election. However, owing to the Gilets Jaunes protests and the rise of national populism within France, Macron opted to run a campaign focusing more on electing representatives of his party to the European Parliament, than campaigning for ALDE. Macron styled his campaign as "Renaissance", calling for a renaissance across Europe. The electoral slate which comprised Macron's LaREM, MoDem and other parties was subsequently named the Renaissance List.

On 15 February, Challenges revealed that EELV MEP Pascal Durand would be on the list in an electable position and Séjourné in the top 25 places. The centre-right party Agir proposed several candidates for the list, including two in electable position: Nicolas Barnier (the son of Michel Barnier and a parliamentary assistant), as well as Fabienne Keller, Gilles Boyer, Élisabeth Morin-Chartier, and Xavier Fournier. In an interview published in Challenges on 6 February, Radical Movement co-president Laurent Hénart indicated that the movement would likely vote to join a common list, sparking dissent among some ex-PRG members including co-president Sylvia Pinel, who announced her departure from the party to resurrect the PRG on two days later. The candidates it proposed included outgoing MEP Dominique Riquet, Olga Johnson, and Mélanie Fortier. One outgoing MEP, Jean Arthuis, announced that he would not seek to run again in 2019, and Agir MEP Tokia Saïfi also retired, as did the party's other MEP Élisabeth Morin-Chartier after learning she would not be in electable position on the list. Foreign nationals were also on the list, including former Italian undersecretary for European affairs Sandro Gozi. After declining to run as a lead candidate, Canfin ultimately appeared in second on the list.

La République En Marche considered alliances with similar European political parties including Citizens in Spain and the Democratic Party in Italy, as well as parties outside of the Alliance of Liberals and Democrats for Europe (ALDE). Pieyre-Alexandre Anglade was delegated with the task of forming contacts with potential European partners. On 9 September 2018, Guy Verhofstadt, leader of the ALDE group, claimed that La République En Marche would ally with ALDE, which Castaner denied. Reports in October indicated Macron and Dutch prime minister Mark Rutte reached an agreement in principle for an alliance, though Anglade emphasized that ALDE parties would merely serve as the foundation, with EPP parties on the right such as Civic Platform in Poland and New Democracy in Greece as well as PES parties on the left including the Democratic Party in Italy and the Social Democratic Party of Austria in consideration. The party considered recruiting MEPs to form a group after the election. Following the airing of a report on France 2 on 11 March about ALDE's financial backing from Monsanto, manufacturer of glyphosate, the party announced that it would not join the ALDE, leading the latter to announce it would no longer accept corporate donations. Verhofstadt later announced on 2 May that the ALDE group would be dissolved after the elections to ally and create a new group. Following the election, the ALDE parliamentary group reformed into Renew Europe, incorporating Macron's Renaissance.

François Bayrou, the leader of the Democratic Movement (MoDem) has previously proposed the formation of a coalition that would include centrist and centre-right parties. In November 2021, president of the National Assembly, Richard Ferrand, accepted his proposal and together they had formed Ensemble Citoyens for the upcoming 2022 legislative elections. Besides the Democratic Movement and Renaissance, Agir was also its founding member. In the following month, they were joined by the Radical Party, Horizons, Territories of Progress, and En Commun.

From its foundation in November, the coalition has been headed by Ferrand as its leader, Bayrou and Édouard Philippe as vice-presidents, and Stanislas Guerini as secretary-general. Jean Castex has also affiliated himself with the coalition. Philippe suspended its participation in the coalition on 14 January 2022, although, four days later he had announced that his party was reinstated into the coalition. In April, LREM announced that it would change its party name to "Renaissance", and a month later, the name of the coalition was shortened to just Ensemble. The Progressive Federation joined the coalition in May 2022.

Just prior 2024 legislative elections, Union of Democrats and Independents also joined the coalition.

== Members ==
Logo	Party	Abbreviation	Main ideology	Position	Leader
	Renaissance	RE	Liberalism	Centre to centre-right (Note: The party has also been described as radical centrist,, right-wing, or a big tent/catch-all party.)	Gabriel Attal
	Democratic Movement	MoDem	Christian democracy	Centre-right	François Bayrou
	Horizons	HOR	Liberal conservatism	Centre-right	Édouard Philippe
	Union of Democrats and Independents (since 2024)	UDI	Liberalism	Centre to centre-right	Hervé Marseille
	Radical Party	PRV	Social liberalism	Centre	Nathalie Delattre
	Progressive Federation	FP	Social democracy	Centre	François Rebsamen
	Republican Refoundation	RR	Gaullism; Left Gaullism	Centre	Jean-Yves Autexier

== Objectives ==
The coalition aimed to bring the presidential majority of Emmanuel Macron together in order to present its joint candidates for the 2022 French legislative election. In May 2022, Ferrand indicated their commitment for "a stable majority in the National Assembly", while Philippe specified that the program of Ensemble "is that of the Macron". Bayrou indicated that the parties would form a joint parliamentary group in the National Assembly, however Renaissance, MoDem, and Horizons each formed separate parliamentary groups following the legislative elections. Some media sources consider it as a modern incarnation of Valéry Giscard d'Estaing's Union for French Democracy (UDF), founded in 1978.

== Election results ==
=== Legislative elections ===
National Assembly
Election year	Leader	First round		Second round		Seats	Role in government
Election year	Leader	Votes	%	Votes	%	Seats	Role in government
2022	Élisabeth Borne	5,857,364	25.71	8,002,419	38.57	245 / 577	Presidential minority
2024	Gabriel Attal	6,820,261	21.27	6,692,358	24.53	159 / 577	Presidential minority (2024)
2024	Gabriel Attal	6,820,261	21.27	6,692,358	24.53	159 / 577	Presidential minority (2024−2025)
2024	Gabriel Attal	6,820,261	21.27	6,692,358	24.53	159 / 577	Presidential minority (2025–)

=== European elections ===
European Parliament (France)
Election	Leader	Votes	%	Seats	+/–	EP Group
2019	Nathalie Loiseau	5,079,015	22.42 (#2)	23 / 79	New	RE
2024	Valérie Hayer	3,589,114	14.56 (#2)	13 / 81	▼10	RE

=== Regional elections ===
Election year	First round		Second round		Presidencies	Seats
Election year	Votes	%	Votes	%	Presidencies	Seats
2021	1,551,669	10.57	1,088,398	7.13	1 / 17	138 / 1,926

== Symbols ==
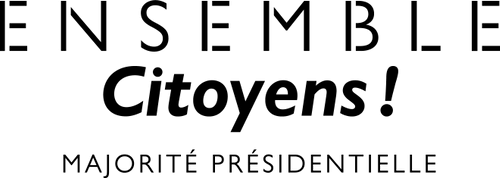
Initial logo of Ensemble, upon its creation

Second logo, utilized during the 2022 legislative election

Logo used by Ensemble's delegation to the European Parliament

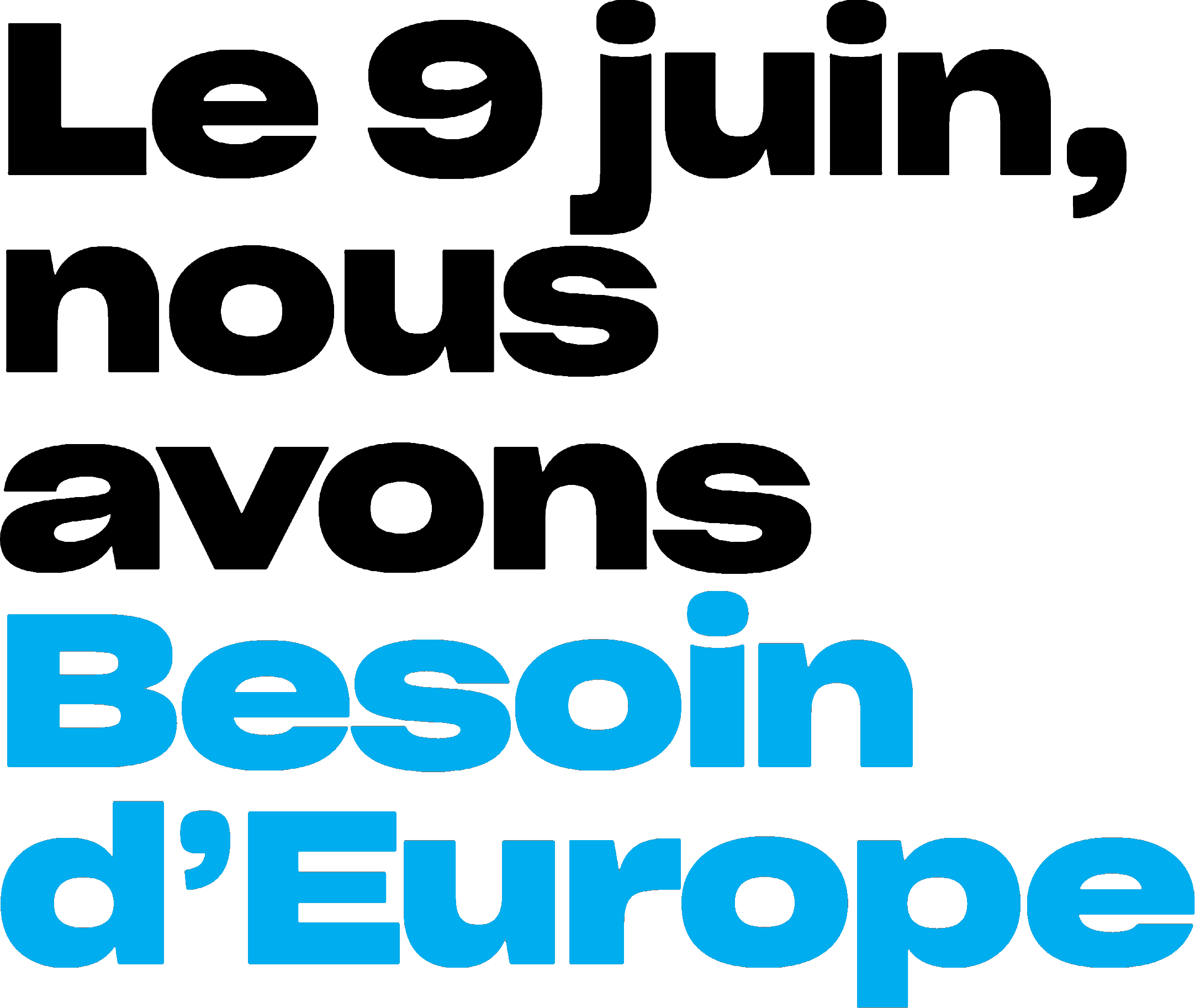
Logo of the 'Besoin d'Europe' list of RE, MoDem, Horizons and other liberal parties

== See also ==
- Political coalition
