= North-West France (European Parliament constituency) =

Former European Parliament constituency

- European Parliament constituency
- Location among the 2014 constituencies

- Shown within France
- Member state: France
- Created: 2004
- MEPs: 12

Until 2019, North-West France was a European Parliament constituency. It consisted of the French regions of Normandy, and Hauts-de-France. Ahead of the 2019 European Parliament election, it and the seven other constituencies that made up France were abolished in favor of a single national vote.

== Members of the European Parliament ==
Election	MEP (party)	MEP (party)	MEP (party)	MEP (party)	MEP (party)	MEP (party)	MEP (party)	MEP (party)	MEP (party)	MEP (party)	MEP (party)	MEP (party)
2004	Jacky Henin (PCF)	Jean-Louis Cottigny (PS)	Brigitte Douay (PS)	Marie-Noëlle Lienemann (PS)	Vincent Peillon (PS)	Henri Weber (PS)	Hélène Flautre (LV/ EELV)	Brigitte Fouré (UDF)	Jean-Paul Gauzès (UMP)	Tokia Saïfi (UMP; Radical /Agir)	Carl Lang (FN)	Fernand Le Rachinel (FN)
2009	Jacky Hénin (LFG)	Gilles Pargneaux (PS)	Estelle Grelier (PS)	Corinne Lepage (MoDem)	10 seats		Hélène Flautre (LV/ EELV)	Dominique Riquet (Radical)	Jean-Paul Gauzès (UMP)	Tokia Saïfi (UMP; Radical /Agir)	Philippe Boulland (UMP)	Marine Le Pen (FN)
2014	Steeve Briois (FN)	Gilles Pargneaux (PS)	Mylène Troszczynski (FN)	9 seats			Karima Delli; EELV	Dominique Riquet (Radical)	Mylène Troszczynski (FN/ DLF)	Tokia Saïfi (UMP; Radical /Agir)	Jérôme Lavrilleux (Ind.)	Nicolas Bay (FN)
2017	Steeve Briois (FN)	Gilles Pargneaux (PS)	Mylène Troszczynski (FN)	9 seats			Karima Delli; EELV	Dominique Riquet (Radical)	Mylène Troszczynski (FN/ DLF)	Tokia Saïfi (UMP; Radical /Agir)	Jérôme Lavrilleux (Ind.)	Nicolas Bay (FN)
2018	Steeve Briois (FN)	Gilles Pargneaux (PS)	Mylène Troszczynski (FN)	9 seats			Karima Delli; EELV	Dominique Riquet (Radical)	Mylène Troszczynski (FN/ DLF)	Tokia Saïfi (UMP; Radical /Agir)	Jérôme Lavrilleux (Ind.)	Nicolas Bay (FN)

== Results ==
=== 2009 ===
European Election 2009: North-West France
List	Candidates	Votes	Of total (%)	± from prev.
UMP	Dominique Riquet Tokia Saïfi Jean-Paul Gauzès Pascale Gruny	601,556	24.22	+10.89
PS	Gilles Pargneaux Estelle Grelier	449,533	18.10	−11.88
EELV	Hélène Flautre	300,579	12.10	+5.27
FN	Marine Le Pen	253,009	10.18	−2.68
MoDem	Corinne Lepage	215,482	8.67	−2.67
FG	Jacky Hénin	169,813	6.84	+0.04
NPA	None	143,967	5.80	
Libertas	None	105,753	4.26	−4.64
AEI	None	88,494	3.56	
DLR	None	59,525	2.40	
LO	None	51,767	2.08	
Far right	None	37,689	1.52	
Eŭropo Demokratio Esperanto	None	4,680	0.19	+0.16
Communists	None	607	0.02	
Europe décroissance	None	592	0.02	
CNIP	None	455	0.02	
Union des gens	None	421	0.02	
Rassemblement pour l'initiative citoyenne	None	218	0.01	
Turnout		2,613,947	39.79	

=== 2004 ===
Brackets indicate the number of votes per seat won.

European Election 2004: North-West
List	Candidates	Votes	Of total (%)	± from prev.
PS	Henri Weber Vincent Peillon Marie-Noëlle Lienemann Brigitte Douay Jean-Louis Cottigny	772,317 (154,463.4)	29.98	
UMP	Tokia Saïfi Jean-Paul Gauzes	343,354 (171,677)	13.33	
FN	Carl Lang Chantal Simonot	331,342 (165,671)	12.86	
UDF	Jean-Louis Bourlanges	292,220	11.34	
LV	Hélène Flautre	176,002	6.83	
PCF	Jacky Henin	175,095	6.8	
MPF	None	153,316	5.95	
CPNT	None	75,994	2.95	
Far left	None	74,606	2.90	
RPF	None	49,615	1.93	
La France d'en bas	None	44,253	1.72	
Workers' Party	None	30,344	1.18	
Rassemblement des Contribuables Français	None	26,826	1.04	
PRG	None	23,443	0.91	
Vivre mieux avec l'Europe	None	5,875	0.23	
AR	None	787	0.03	
Eŭropo Demokratio Esperanto	None	753	0.03	
Parti Fédéraliste	None	201	0.01	
France indépendante	None	0	0.00	
Turnout		2,576,343	42.12	
