= Constituencies of France =

Constituencies (circonscriptions) or electoral districts are used for various elections in France.

== List ==
| Assembly | Constituencies |
|---|---|
| National Assembly | List of constituencies: For residents of Metropolitan France, each department is split into numbered constituencies; For residents of Overseas France, similar is true except the overseas collectivities of Saint Martin and Saint Barthélemy share a single constituency; French people living outside France vote in one of eleven constituencies, each of which groups neighbouring foreign countries. |
| Senate | French Senate elections are indirect; each department is a constituency, with all its elected local representatives forming an electoral college to vote for its Senators. |
| European Parliament | France forms a single constituency with an at-large election. From 2004 to 2019 there were eight geographic constituencies |
| Departmental council | Each canton of the department is a constituency |

== See also ==
- Lists of electoral districts by country and territory
