= Pascale Gruny =

French politician

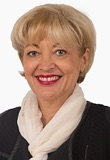

Member of the French Senate for Aisne
- Incumbent
- Assumed office 1 October 2014
- Preceded by: Pierre André

Member of the National Assembly for Aisne's 2nd constituency
- In office 2007–2012
- Preceded by: Xavier Bertrand
- Succeeded by: Xavier Bertrand

Member of the European Parliament
- In office 2009–2010
- Succeeded by: Philippe Boulland
- Constituency: North-West France

Personal details
- Born: 18 February 1960 (age 66) Cambrai, France
- Party: UMP; The Republicans

Pascale Gruny (born 18 February 1960) was a member of the National Assembly of France. She represented the Aisne department, and is a member of the Union for a Popular Movement.

She is a former Member of the European Parliament (MEP) elected in the 2009 European election for the North-West constituency.
