= Patrick Bourson =

French politician

Patrick Bourson (French pronunciation: [patʁik buʁsɔ̃]) is a French politician and a member of the far-right FN led by Jean-Marie Le Pen.

In 2009, the FN selected him to lead the FN list in the Massif Central constituency ahead of the 2009 European elections.
