= Hélène Franco =

French magistrate and politician

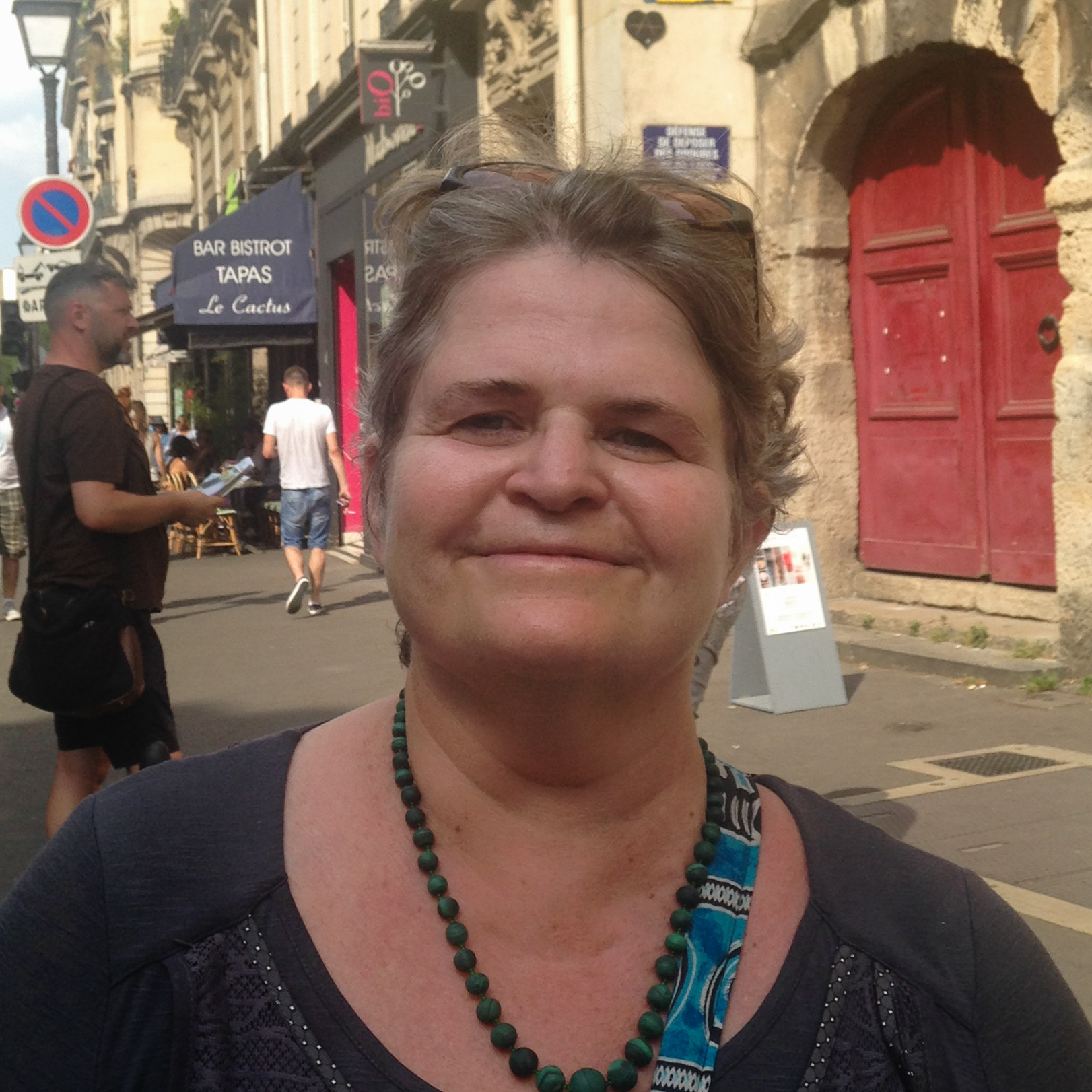
- Franco in 2017
- Born: 4 June 1971 (age 54); Lons-le-Saunier, France
- Education: Sciences Po; French National School for the Judiciary
- Occupation: Magistrate

Hélène Franco (born 4 June 1971 in Lons-le-Saunier, Jura) is a French magistrate and politician. She is the general secretary of the Syndicat de la magistrature, the left-wing magistrates' labour union.

She was close to Jean-Luc Mélenchon in the Socialist Party (PS) and she followed him to form the Left Party when he left the PS in November 2008.

In 2009, she was selected to lead the Left Front list in the East constituency ahead of the 2009 European elections.
