= Gilles Pargneaux =

French politician (born 1957)

Gilles Pargneaux MEP
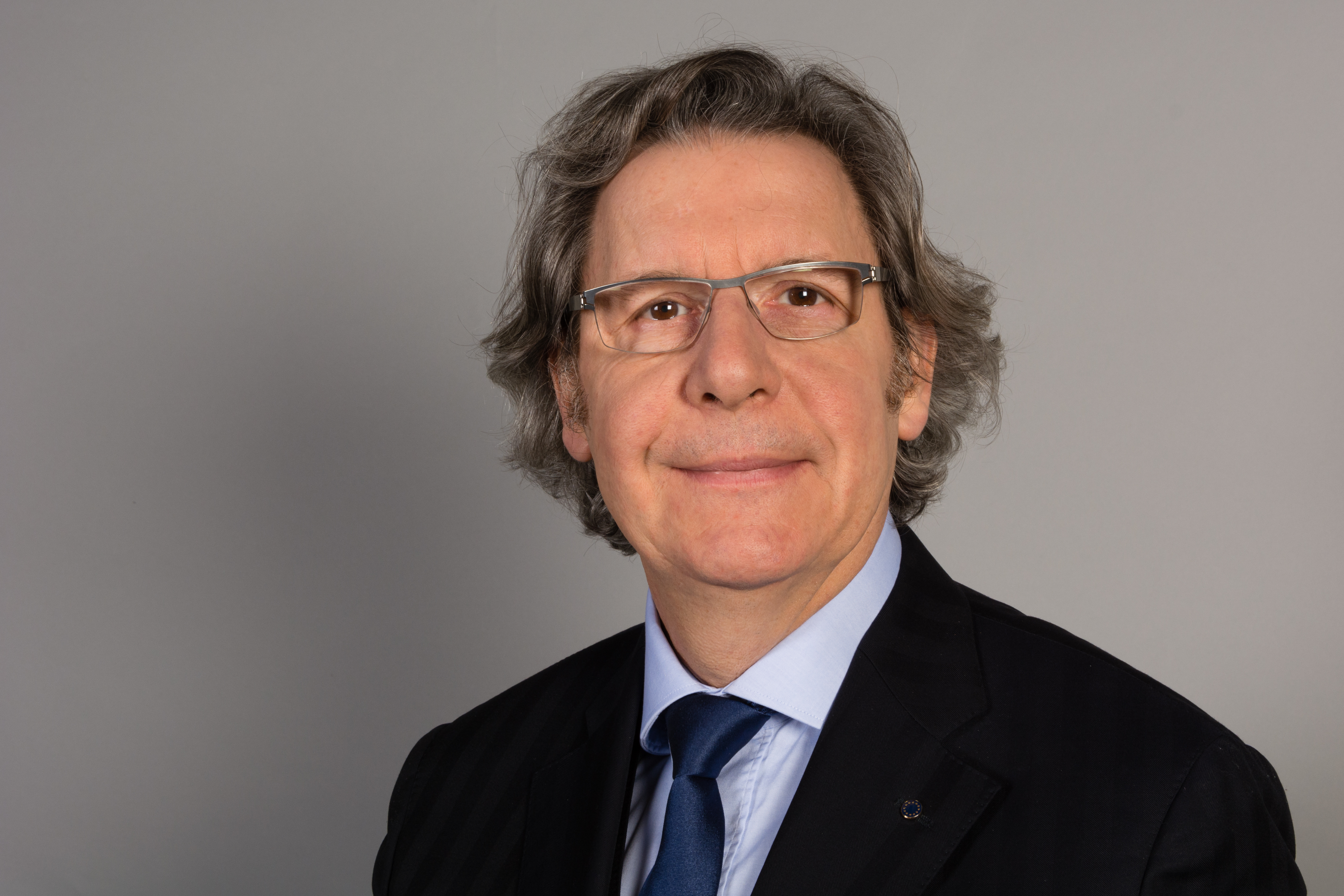

Member of the European Parliament for France
- In office 2009–2019

Personal details
- Born: 24 March 1957 (age 69) Harcigny, France
- Party: Socialist Party (1974-2018); La République En Marche! (since 2018)

Gilles Pargneaux (born 24 March 1957 in Harcigny) is a French politician of La République En Marche! (LREM) who served as a Member of the European Parliament (MEP) for the North-West constituency from 2009 until 2019. He is also the leader of the PS federation in Lille.

== Political career ==
In 2009, the PS selected Pargneaux to lead the PS list in the North-West constituency ahead of the 2009 European elections. His list won 18.09% and two seats, so he was elected to the European Parliament.

Throughout his time in the European Parliament, Pargneaux served as member of the Committee on the Environment, Public Health and Food Safety. In this capacity, he led the parliament’s negotiations with the Council on more coordinated responses to cross-border health threats in 2013. From 2014, he was the committee’s vice-chairman. In this capacity, he represented the Parliament at the 2015 United Nations Climate Change Conference in Paris.

Pargneaux also served on the Committee on Budgetary Control and the Subcommittee on Security and Defence from 2014 until 2019. In addition to his committee assignments, he was a member of the Parliamentary Assembly of the Mediterranean and headed the ‘Friends of Morocco’ group in the European Parliament. In 2014, he advocated for a renewed EU–Morocco Fisheries Partnership Agreement.

In December 2017, Pargneaux launched an informal group inside the European Parliament in support of La République En Marche! (LREM).

== Links ==
- Gilles PARGNEAUX. European Parliament. Accessed 2011-01-20.
