= Mylène Troszczynski =

French politician

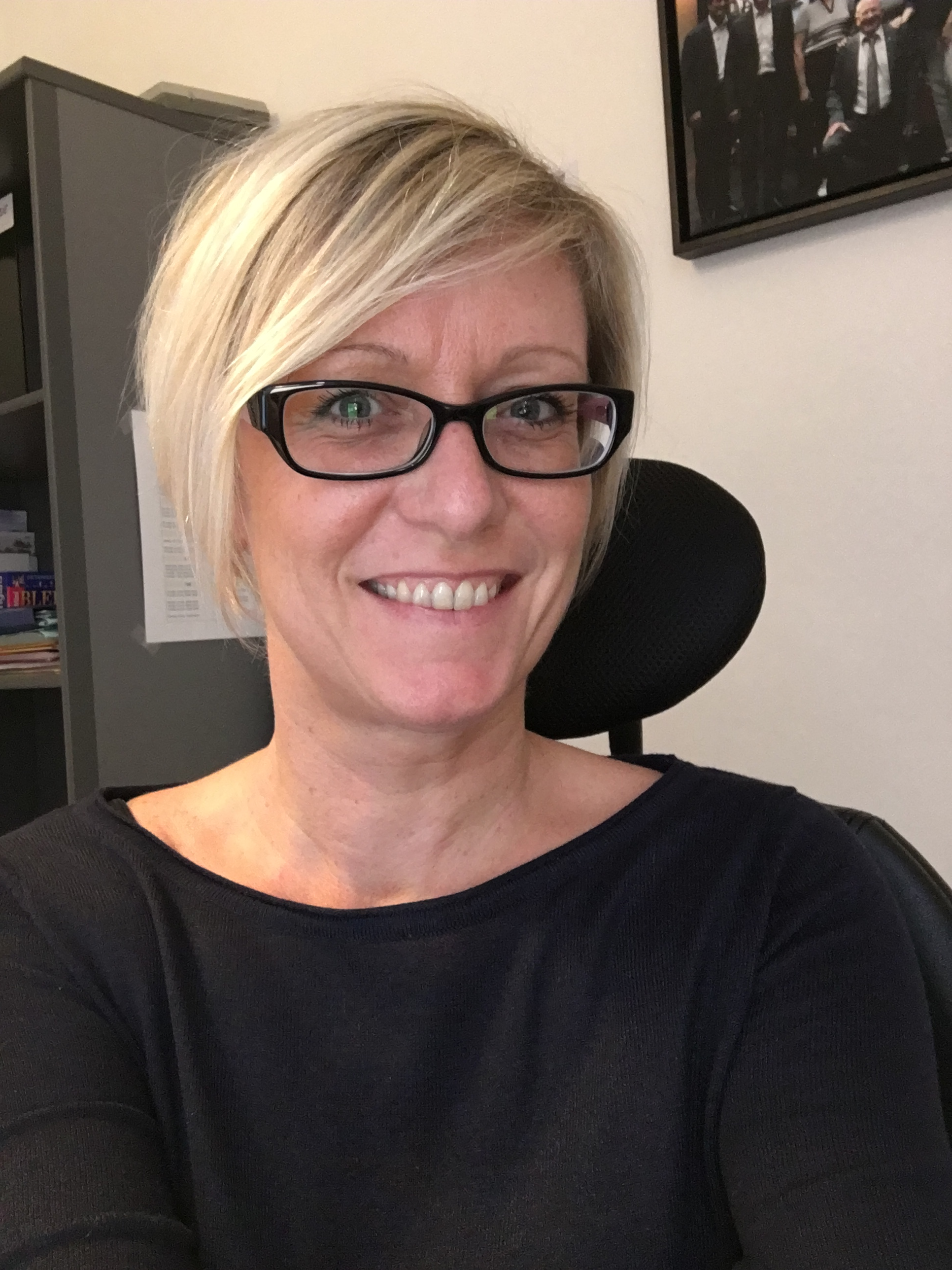

Member of the European Parliament for North-West France
- In office 1 July 2014 – 2019

Personal details
- Born: 16 May 1972 (age 54) Chauny, France
- Party: National Front

Mylène Troszczynski (born 16 May 1972) was a National Front Member of the European Parliament representing North-West France. She was an MEP 2014–2019.

In 2018, Troszczynski was ordered by the European General Court to repay €56,554 that she claimed in expenses to pay a parliamentary assistant to perform tasks unrelated to her duties.

== Personal life ==
Troszczynski is the daughter of a banker and an accountant, granddaughter of a Polish immigrant. She studied history at the University of Reims Champagne-Ardenne.
