= 2009 European Parliament election in France =

← 2004	7 June 2009	2014 →
- All 72 French seats in the European Parliament
- Turnout: 40.63%
Party	Leader	Vote %	Seats	+/–
UMP–NC–GM	Xavier Bertrand	27.88	29	+12
PS	Martine Aubry	16.48	14	−17
EELV	Daniel Cohn-Bendit	16.28	14	+8
MoDem	François Bayrou	8.46	6	New
FG–AOM	Marie-George Buffet	6.48	5	+2
FN	Jean-Marie Le Pen	6.34	3	−4
Libertas	Jérôme Rivière	4.80	1	−2
This lists parties that won seats. See the complete results below.

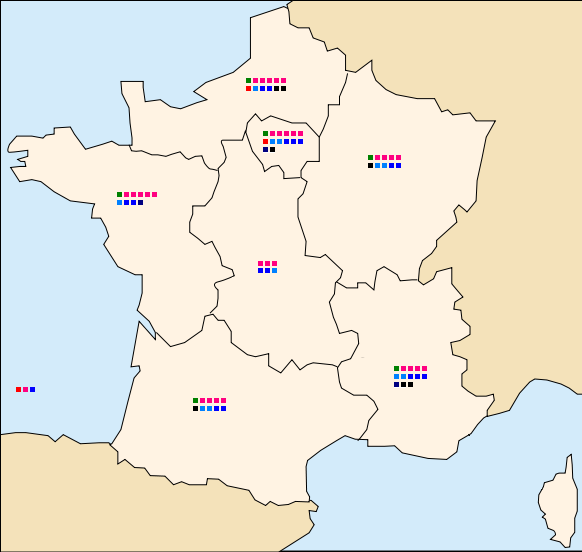
French MEPs elected in 2004

European Parliament elections were held in France on Sunday 7 June 2009 to elect the 72 French Members of the European Parliament.

Due to the entry of Romania and Bulgaria in the European Union in 2007, the number of seats allocated to France was revised from 78 to 72 seats, a loss of 6 seats. France now represents only 9.8% of all European MEPs compared to 12.5% in 2004 and 19.8% in 1979, following the first European election.

The turnout in European elections in France has almost always declined, with the sole exception of an increase in 1994, falling from 60.7% turnout in the 1979 election to 43.1% in the latest election in 2004.

== Candidates for parliamentary parties ==
Top Candidates by Constituency
Region								
Region	UMP-NC-LGM	PS	MoDem	Europe Ecology	Left Front (PCF-PG-GU)	FN	MPF-CPNT	PDF
East	Joseph Daul	Catherine Trautmann	Jean-François Kahn	Sandrine Bélier	Hélène Franco	Bruno Gollnisch	Christophe Beaudouin	—
Île-de-France	Michel Barnier	Harlem Désir	Marielle de Sarnez	Daniel Cohn-Bendit	Patrick Le Hyaric	Jean-Michel Dubois	Jérôme Rivière	—
Massif central-Centre	Jean-Pierre Audy	Henri Weber	Jean-Marie Beaupuy	Jean-Paul Besset	Marie-France Beaufils	Patrick Bourson	Véronique Goncalvès	Jean Verdon
North-West	Dominique Riquet	Gilles Pargneaux	Corinne Lepage	Hélène Flautre	Jacky Hénin	Marine Le Pen	Frédéric Nihous	Carl Lang
Overseas	Marie-Luce Penchard	Ericka Bareigts		Harry Durimel	Alliance of the Overseas	—	Erika Kuttner-Perreau	—
South-East	Françoise Grossetête	Vincent Peillon	Jean-Luc Bennahmias	Michèle Rivasi	Marie-Christine Vergiat	Jean-Marie Le Pen	Patrick Louis	—
South-West	Dominique Baudis	Kader Arif	Robert Rochefort	José Bové	Jean-Luc Mélenchon	Louis Aliot	Eddie Puyjalon	Jean-Claude Martinez
West	Christophe Béchu	Bernadette Vergnaud	Sylvie Goulard	Yannick Jadot	Jacques Généreux	Brigitte Neveux	Philippe de Villiers	—

== Opinion polls ==
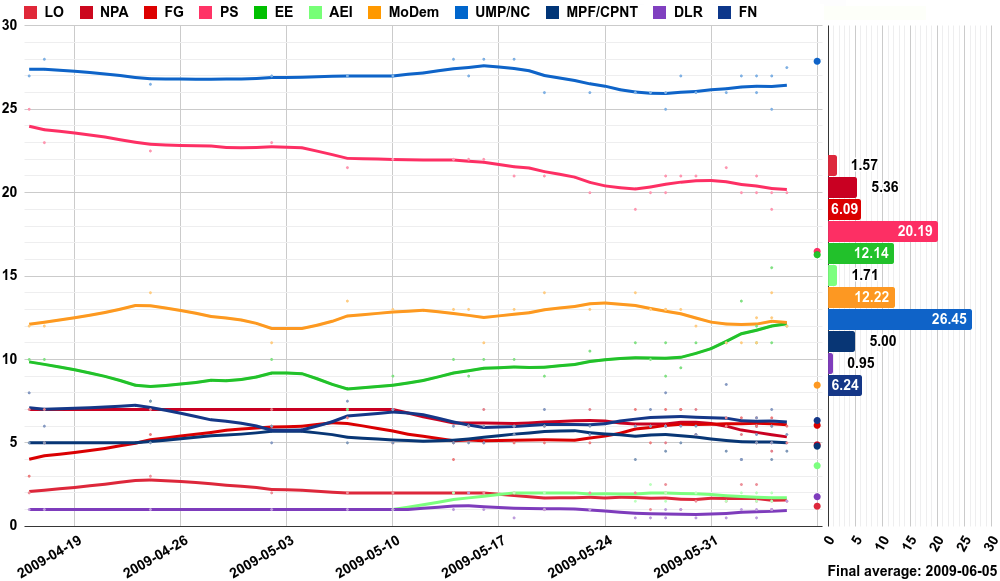

== Results ==
Nicolas Sarkozy's governing Union for a Popular Movement (UMP) won a pleasing result, the first time the presidential party had won since the first European elections in 1979. Compared to the party's disastrous 2004 result, it gained 12 seats and over 11% in the popular vote. However, many have said that the UMP is the only governing party in France, making its position very weak compared to the combined opposition.

Led since the tumultuous Reims Congress by Martine Aubry, the main opposition party, the Socialists, won a very bad result: only 16.48% and suffering a loss of 17 seats. Prominent Socialist MEPs, including defeated leadership candidate Benoît Hamon, lost their seats. The Socialists lost most votes in middle-class urban areas, while holding their ground better in their rural strongholds.

The Europe Ecology was the surprise of these elections, with a remarkable 16.28% and the same number of MEPs as the Socialist Party. The green coalition's result was the best result ever for any French Green party, beating out the previous record set by Antoine Waechter in the 1989 European elections – 10.59%. The gains made by the Greens also came from the centrist MoDem led by François Bayrou. The MoDem won only 8.45%, a surprisingly low result for the centrist party, thought to be France's third party.

The far-right FN suffered loses, being reduced to only 3 MEPs. The conservative nationalist Libertas coalition formed around Philippe de Villiers's Movement for France, but also including the smaller agrarian Hunting, Fishing, Nature, Tradition, suffered losses compared to the two parties' combined 8% showing in 2004. De Villiers was re-elected, becoming the only Libertas.eu MEP elected in the European Union.

On the left of the PS, the new Left Front formed around the French Communist Party and the smaller Left Party surpassed Olivier Besancenot's New Anticapitalist Party. The Left Front and an ally overseas won 6.47% and 5 seats, while Besancenot's NPA won only 4.88% and no seats (despite polling better on aggregate than Libertas, which did win a seat).

Party	Votes	%	Seats			
Party	Votes	%	Won	+/–	Post-Lisbon	+/–
UMP–NC–GM	4,799,908	27.88	29	+12	30	+1
Socialist Party	2,838,160	16.48	14	–17	14	0
Europe Ecology	2,803,759	16.28	14	+8	15	+1
Democratic Movement	1,455,841	8.46	6	New	6	0
Left Front–Alliance of the Overseas	1,115,021	6.48	5	+2	5	0
National Front	1,091,691	6.34	3	–4	3	0
New Anticapitalist Party	840,833	4.88	0	New	0	0
Libertas France (MPF–CPNT)	826,357	4.80	1	–2	1	0
Independent Ecological Alliance	625,375	3.63	0	0	0	0
Debout la République	304,585	1.77	0	New	0	0
Lutte Ouvrière	205,975	1.20	0	0	0	0
Party of France–House of Life and Freedoms	87,053	0.51	0	New	0	0
Anti-Zionist Party	36,374	0.21	0	New	0	0
Breton Party	32,805	0.19	0	New	0	0
Europe–Democracy–Esperanto	28,945	0.17	0	0	0	0
Earth Otherwise Nothing	28,768	0.17	0	0	0	0
Liberal Alternative	16,944	0.10	0	New	0	0
Resistors	14,521	0.08	0	New	0	0
National Centre of Independents and Peasants	12,750	0.07	0	New	0	0
Solidarity–AMEN	8,656	0.05	0	New	0	0
For a More Fraternal France and Europe	6,529	0.04	0	New	0	0
Europe – Degrowth	5,859	0.03	0	New	0	0
For the Basque Country	5,771	0.03	0	New	0	0
Basque Nationalist Party	4,201	0.02	0	New	0	0
Cannabis Without Borders	4,015	0.02	0	New	0	0
Alliance Royale	3,994	0.02	0	0	0	0
Communists	3,208	0.02	0	New	0	0
People's Union	2,748	0.02	0	New	0	0
Newropeans	2,323	0.01	0	New	0	0
Citizenship European Culture	1,758	0.01	0	New	0	0
Rally for the Citizen's Initiative	1,401	0.01	0	New	0	0
Europe of Gibraltar to Jerusalem	1,197	0.01	0	New	0	0
Humanist Party	999	0.01	0	0	0	0
Stop	266	0.00	0	New	0	0
Program against Precariousness and Sexism	24	0.00	0	New	0	0
Total	17,218,614	100.00	72	–6	74	+2
Valid votes	17,218,614	95.70				
Invalid/blank votes	773,547	4.30				
Total votes	17,992,161	100.00				
Registered voters/turnout	44,282,823	40.63				
Source: France Politique
