= Pierre André =

French politician

Member of the French Senate for Aisne
- In office 1 October 1998 – 30 September 2014
- Succeeded by: Pascale Gruny

Mayor of Saint-Quentin
- In office 18 June 1995 – 27 September 2010
- Preceded by: Daniel Le Meur
- Succeeded by: Xavier Bertrand

Personal details
- Born: 29 June 1947 (age 79) Buire, Aisne, France
- Party: RPR; UMP
- Education: Sciences Po

Pierre André (French pronunciation: [pjɛʁ ɑ̃dʁe]; born 29 June 1947 in Buire) is a former member of the Senate of France, who represented the Aisne department. He is a member of the Union for a Popular Movement.

== Biography ==
A law graduate and former student of the Sciences Po, former director general of the Aisne Chamber of Commerce and Industry, he was elected senator for Aisne on September 27, 1998, then re-elected on September 21, 2008 in the first round. He is a member of the Committee on Economic Affairs, Sustainable Development, and Regional Planning. He did not stand for re-election in the 2014 senatorial election.

== Bibliography ==
- Page on the Senate website
