= France (European Parliament constituency) =

Constituency of the European Parliament

- European Parliament constituency
- Location among the current constituencies
- Member state: France
- Created: 1979
- Dissolved: 2004
- MEPs: 87 (1999)

Recreated
- Created: 2024
- MEPs: 81

France is a European Parliament constituency for the elections to the European Parliament covering the member state of the European Union France. It is currently represented by 81 Members of the European Parliament. From 2004 until 2019, eight subdivided constituencies represented France in the European Parliament.

== Elections ==
=== 1979 ===
The 1979 European election was the first direct election to the European Parliament to be held and hence the first time France had voted.

=== 1984 ===
The 1984 European election was the second election to the European Parliament and the second for France.

=== 1989 ===
The 1989 European election was the third election to the European Parliament and the third for France.

=== 1994 ===
The 1994 European election was the fourth election to the European Parliament and the fourth for France.

=== 1999 ===
The 1999 European election was the fifth election to the European Parliament and the fifth for France.

=== 2019 ===
Seats gained after the United Kingdom left the EU are shown as outlined white circles: Far-left: La France Insoumise (6) Centre-left: Socialist Party (4+1) Greens: The Ecologists (11+1) Centre: LREM–MoDem (19+2) Centre-right: The Republicans (8) Far-right: National Rally (21+1)

The 2019 European election was the ninth election to the European Parliament and the sixth for France as a nationwide constituency. Elections in 2004, 2009 and 2014 were contested in regional constituencies.

The far-right National Rally and President Macron's centrist LREM–MoDem alliance each won 23 seats. The green group The Ecologists won 13, the centre-right group of The Republicans and The Centrists won 8 seats and the far-left group (La France Insoumise) and the centre-left group (led by the Socialist Party) each won 6 seats. The centre-right Union of Democrats and Independents and the French Communist Party each lost the 3 seats they had held in the previous parliament.

As the 2019 election was after the 2016 United Kingdom European Union membership referendum, but before Brexit took effect at midnight CET on the morning of 1 February 2020, several French seats were only taken up after the British members left the European Parliament. These seats are included in the numbers mentioned above and were apportioned with 2 to the centrist LREM–MoDem group and 1 each for the National Rally, The Ecologists and the Socialists. These additional seats are shown as outlined circles in the hemisphere diagram in this section.

=== 2024 ===
Far-left: La France Insoumise and others (9) Centre-left: Socialist Party and others (13) Greens: The Ecologists (5) Centre: Renaissance and others (13) Centre-right: The Republicans and others (6) Far-right: National Rally and others (30) Far-right: Reconquête and others (5)

The 2024 European election was the tenth election to the European Parliament and the seventh for France as a nationwide constituency.

The far-right grouping, led by the National Rally, won 30 of France's 81 seats, with 31.50% of the vote. The centrist group, led by President Emmanuel Macron's Renaissance, and the centre-left group, led by the Socialist Party, each won 13 seats. The far-left, led by La France Insoumise, won 9 seats; the Gaullist centre-right, led by The Republicans, won 6 seats and the greens (The Ecologists) and another far-right group (Éric Zemmour's Reconquête) won 5 seats each.

About one hour after results for the European Parliament election showed that Renaissance would place a distant second to National Rally, Macron dissolved the French National Assembly and called snap legislative elections.
