= Dominique Riquet =

French surgeon and politician (born 1946)

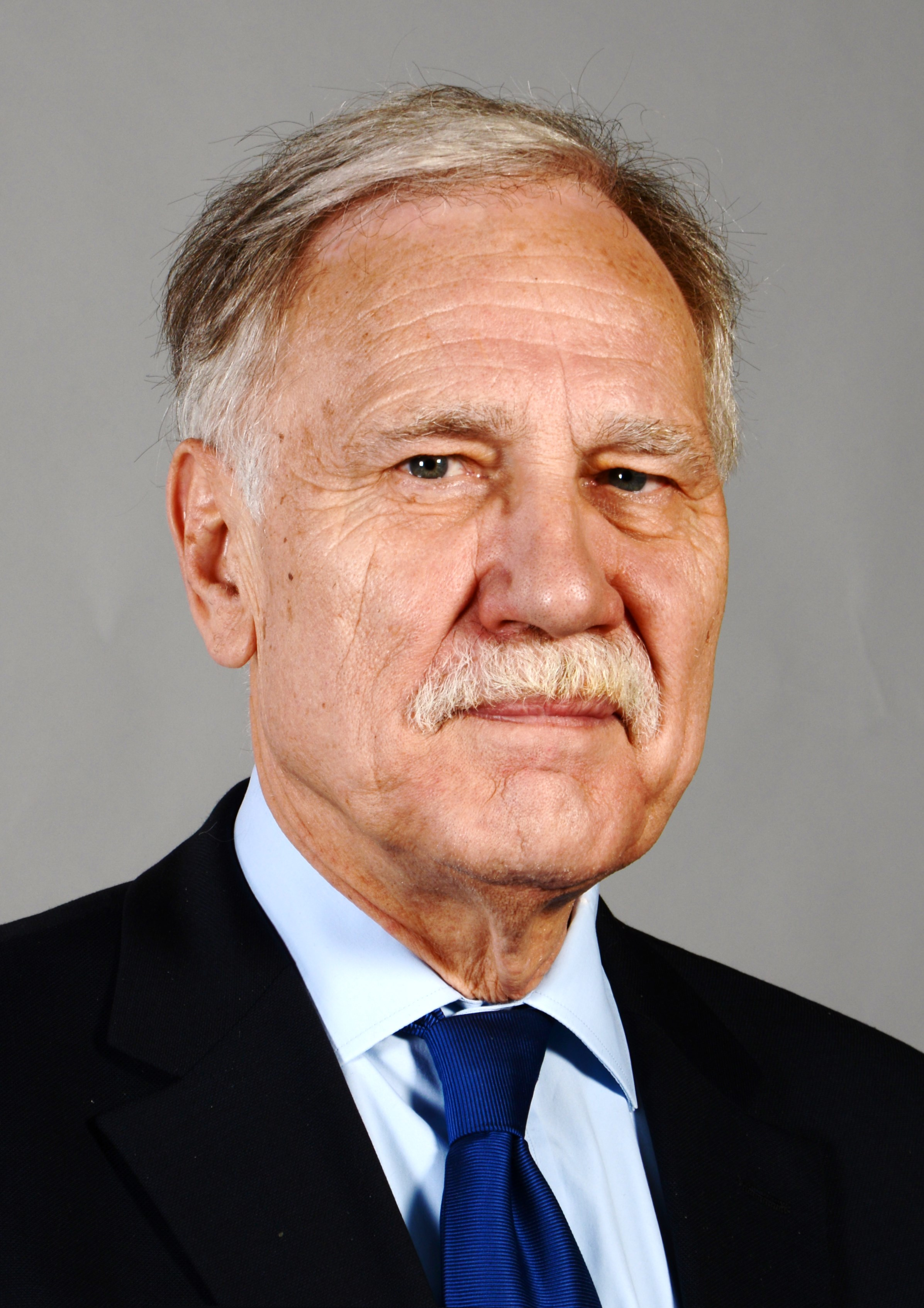

Member of the European Parliament
- In office 14 July 2009 – 2024
- Constituency: North-West France; France

Mayor of Valenciennes
- In office 2002–2012
- Preceded by: Jean-Louis Borloo
- Succeeded by: Valérie Létard

Personal details
- Born: 18 September 1946 (age 79) Valenciennes, France
- Party: MR
- Profession: Surgeon

Dominique Riquet (born 18 September 1946 in Valenciennes, Nord) is a French surgeon and politician of the Radical Party who served as a Member of the European Parliament (MEP) from the 2009 to 2024, representing the North-West constituency. From 2002 until 2012, he was also the mayor of Valenciennes.

== Political career ==
In 2009, the Union for a Popular Movement (UMP) selected him to lead the party's list in the North-West constituency ahead of the 2009 European elections. His list won 24.22% and he was easily elected to the European Parliament. In his first parliamentary term from 2009 until 2014, Riquet was a member of the European People's Party group. Following the 2014 elections, he moved to the Alliance of Liberals and Democrats for Europe group; from 2017 until 2019, he was one of the group's vice-chairs under the leadership of chairman Guy Verhofstadt.

In parliament, Riquet served on the Committee on Transport and Tourism since 2012; in this capacity, he notably co-led the negotiations on the Connecting Europe Facility (CEF) for the Parliament. From 2009 until 2014, he was also a member of the Committee on Budgets. In addition, he was part of the 2016/2017 inquiry into whether the EU should have acted more quickly to address the Volkswagen emissions scandal.

Following the 2019 elections, Riquet served as one of eight vice chairs of the Renew Europe group, under the leadership of chairman Dacian Cioloș.

In addition to his committee assignments, Riquet chaired the European Parliament Intergroup on Long Term Investment and Reindustrialisation and was a member of the European Parliament Intergroup on Children’s Rights the European Parliament Intergroup on Climate Change, Biodiversity and Sustainable Development, and the MEPs Against Cancer group.

== Political positions ==
In a joint letter with 15 other MEPs from various political groups, Riquet urged the High Representative of the Union for Foreign Affairs and Security Policy Josep Borrell in early 2021 to replace the European Union's ambassador to Cuba for allegedly siding with the country's Communist leadership.
