= Corinne Lepage =

French politician

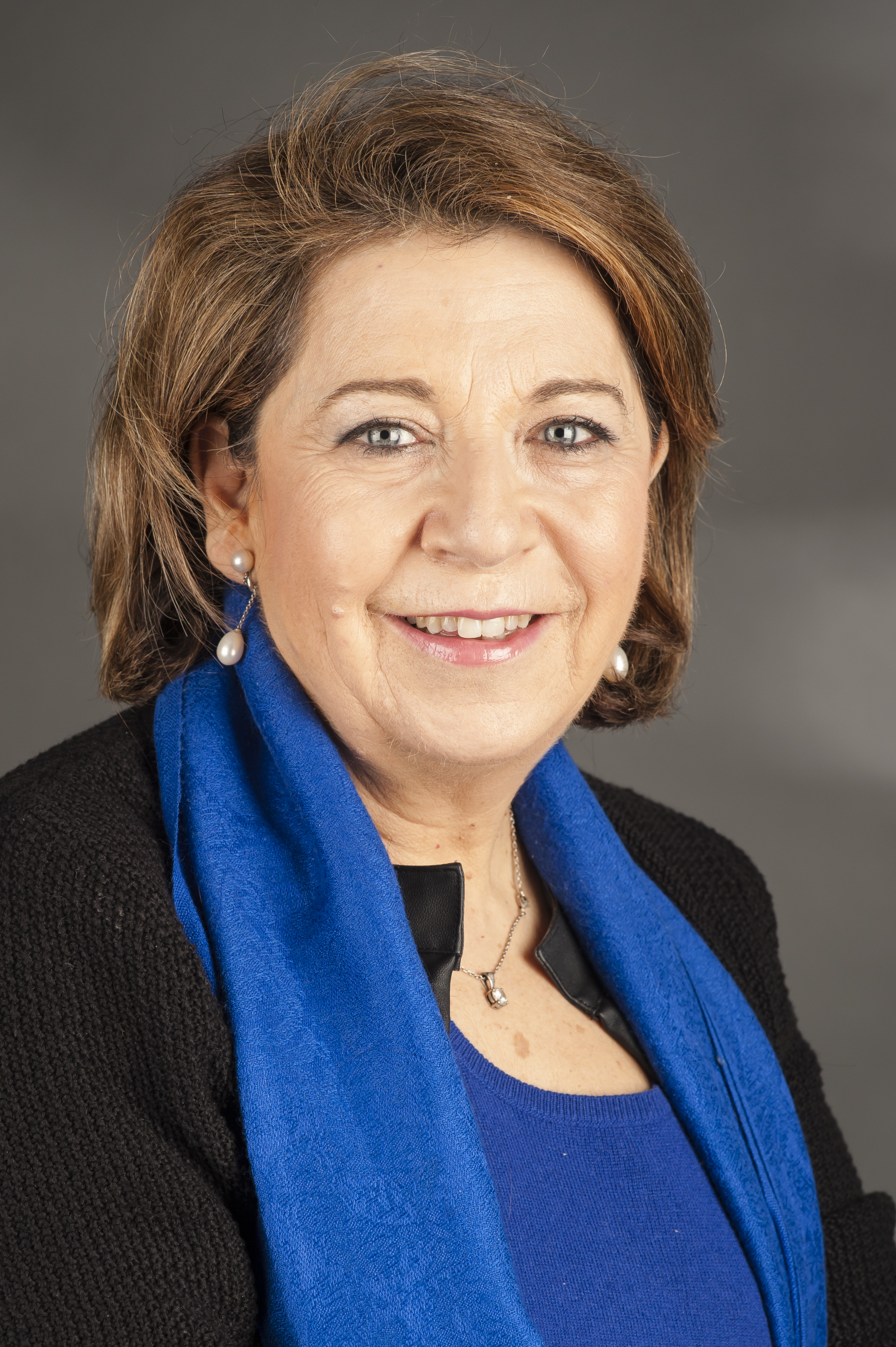

French Minister of the Environment
- In office 1995–1997
- President: Jacques Chirac
- Prime Minister: Alain Juppé
- Preceded by: Michel Barnier
- Succeeded by: Dominique Voynet

Member of the European Parliament
- In office 2009–2014
- Constituency: North-West France

Personal details
- Born: Corinne Dominique Marguerite Lepage; 11 May 1951 (age 75) Boulogne-Billancourt, France
- Party: CAP 21
- Spouse: Christian Huglo
- Education: Sciences Po; Panthéon-Assas University
- Website: www.corinne-lepage.fr/

Corinne Dominique Marguerite Lepage (French pronunciation: [kɔʁin dɔminik maʁɡəʁit ləpaʒ]; born 11 May 1951) is a French environmental lawyer and politician. She served as French Minister of the Environment in the Alain Juppé cabinets 1 and II 1995–1997 and as Member of the European Parliament (MEP) 2009–2014 for the North-West constituency.

She is the founder and President since 1996 of the Citizenship, Action, Participation for the 21st Century Party (CAP 21). She is also co-founder of the centrist Mouvement démocrate and served as Vice-President for the party until March 2010, when she announced that she was leaving the movement.

== Biography ==
Lepage was born in 1951 into a Jewish family in Boulogne-Billancourt, in the department of Hauts-de-Seine. She attended Sciences Po in Paris, where she obtained her law diploma and began practising law in 1975. At the same time, she was appointed Maître de conférences (the equivalent of a university lecturer), and later a Professor at Sciences-Po and Panthéon-Assas University from 1982 to 1986, and then at the Université de Paris at Val-deMarne from 1984 to 1990. She has taught at the Université de Paris at St.-Quentin-en-Yvelines since 2005. She is married and the mother of two children.

=== Huglo-Lepage ===
As a young lawyer, Lepage married Christian Huglo in 1983 and joined the latter's law firm, the first one specialising in environmental rights. In 1987 she joined the Conseil de l'Ordre des avocats.

In 1978, during the Amoco Cadiz disaster, when an American oil tanker caused a huge oil spill near the coast of Brittany, Lepage's law firm sided with the local authorities of Finistère and the Côtes-du-Nord against the American oil company Amoco. After a 15-year-long trial, Lepage's firm and the local authorities won, setting a precedent and giving greater protection to individuals, towns and regions victim of serious pollution.

She then worked on many cases concerning the environment, along with local associations, groups, companies or local government. Since 2006, Lepage has sided with the victims of the MV Erika oil spill of 12 December 1999 against Total among others. Since 2010, she supports the "Movement for the Rights and the Respect of Future Generations". She also works as a lawyer for the Association of the Victims of the Floods of La Faute-sur-Mere in wake of Hurricane Xynthia.

=== Environmental activism ===
Lepage has also defended environmental interests outside of her political career, such as in the Paris and Brussels bar associations and by involvement in numerous NGOs. She is also the co-founder with Michèle Rivasi of the Observatory for Environmental Vigilance and Alertness.

With Gilles-Éric Séralini, she co-founded CRIIGEN (Committee for Research and Independent Information on Genetic Engineering), an organization that opposes genetically modified food.

According to Lepage, politics cannot create on its own, without the mobilisation of NGOs and civil society, the solutions and changes necessary to our economic system. In 1996 she said in an interview that "the growing involvement of civil society is essential for the environment and sustainable development". Following the Copenhagen Summit in 2009 she asserted that: "Civil society can now only count on itself to ensure its own future."

Between November 2007 and February 2008, Lepage wrote a report for the French Minister of the Environment, Jean-Louis Borlooon "environmental governance". This report, according to the official of the Grenelle Environnement "makes over 80 propositions, including 10 flagship measures, aimed at restoring the confidence of the French in information on the environment" and "proposes notably measures to improve this information, to reinforce rules regarding expertise and clarify liability in case of pollution".

Lepage also teaches at Versailles Saint-Quentin-en-Yvelines University and Institut d'Études Politiques de Paris as a professor of Sustainable Development.

== Political career ==
Since her participation in the Alain Juppé government (1995–97), Lepage has sometimes been considered by the media as a right-wing environmentalist, a characterization she does not accept: "they tell me that I am a right-wing environmentalist, no. [...] I am not of the right [...] but I fight for what seems to me to be fundamental for us all in the coming years. [...] The social question was the great debate of the 20th century, I believe the environmental question will be the great debate of the 21st."

Lepage associates herself above all with green and environmentalist politics, attempting to combine ideas of both left and right on environmental issues. From her participation in Ecology Generation in 1990 up to the creation of her own think tank Terre Démocrate in 2009, she shows a desire to "transcend political differencecs" and overcome traditional left/right opposition, in order to "bring people together, beyond their political colors, on the environment". Close at once to Daniel Cohn-Bendit and François Bayrou, she works for the emergence of "a genuine pragmatic effort, based on fair and sustainable development, democratic and humanist". She notably wants a rapprochement between centrists and environmentalists.

=== Early politics (1981–1995) ===
Lepage says that "I got into environmentalism very early, in the 1960s. As an environmentalist candidate in 1981, and elected in 1989". She became Deputy Mayor of Cabourg in Calvados in March 1989. In the early 1990s, she became a founding member of Ecology Generation. She ran in the 1993 under this party label for the legislative elections in the fourth district of Calvados. However, she only received 6.17% of the vote.

=== Minister of the Environment (1995–1997) ===
In 1995 she responded affirmatively to a proposal by Alain Juppé to head the Ministry of the Environment in a center-right government. She was then not a member of any political party. According to the left-wing newspaper Libération, her nomination was harshly criticised by the right in Normandy as she had just recently been beaten severely in elections there.

Lepage was one of twelve women in the first Juppé government. On 7 November 1995, during a cabinet reshuffle leading to the second Juppé government, she was the only woman to remain a full Minister. While she says she did not suffer any particular difficulties as a woman in the government, she considers that she was subjected to insults in the National Assembly "which would have never have been hurled against a man".

As Minister of the Environment, Lepage made a priority objective of showing that environmentalism can "contribute to the struggle against unemployment". She also made progress in the area of prevention with the adoption of a Clean Air Law, the creation of the Committee on Prevention and Precaution and, at the end state participation with the Professional Committee on Asbestos.

The controversial relaunch of the Superphénix nuclear reactor, which experienced numerous technical difficulties, led to an open struggle between Lepage and the Minister of Industry Franck Borotra. Because of legal irregularities, Lepage refused to sign the decree authorizing the relaunch of the reactor, implicitly threatening Alain Juppé with resignation. The trade unionist Christian Moesl said during a parliamentary hearing that "Corinne Lepage put Superphénix on the edge of the precipice and Dominique Voynet pushed it over".

A consensus politician, Lepage has been subject to criticism for her silence during the president of Jacques Chirac on certain major environmental issues: the resumption of nuclear tests, the relaunch of the Superphénix nuclear reactor in September 1995, the reduction of the environmental budget, difficulties in implementation the Nature 2000 EU directive.

Lepage used her experiences as a Minister to write a book in which she attacks industrial lobbies, hunters and technocrats in the upper levels of the civil service.

=== In search of a viable centre (1997–2007) ===
On the subject of her political leanings, she said "I do not feel that I am woman of the right, but I do not deny in any way my participation in the governments of Alain Juppé." She ran in the May 1997 legislative elections, in Paris' seventh district. She lost in the second round to Patrick Bloche with almost a 10% gap between the two candidates (54.50% to 45.50%).

The dissolution of the government in 1997 put an end to her ministerial position. She then transformed CAP 21 into a political movement. As Administrator of Transparency International France [tr. note: a non-governmental organisation which fights government corruption in 80 national sections], she is involved in the fight against political and financial corruption.

In 2002, Lepage entered the Presidential race and received 1.88% of the vote in the first ballot. In the regional elections of 2004, she was at the top of the list of the Paris department on the slate of André Santini (Union for French Democracy, UDF). She did not participate in the second ballot run-off on the Union for a Popular Movement (UMP) roster of Jean-François Copé. In the European elections of June 2004, her list for the constituency of Île-de-France would receive 3.6%. She was elected to the European Parliament elected in the 2009 European election in North-West constituency as the MoDem's top candidate.

=== With François Bayrou (2007–2010) ===
On March 10, 2007, she chose not run in the 2007 presidential elections, in order to support François Bayrou. She said that Bayrou "represents today genuine change in this country, which can allow political ecology to have the place it needs." Cap21 was then one of the founding groups of the François Bayrou's new political party, the MoDem.

In May 2007, after Bayrou's defeat in the first round of the presidential elections, and the victory of Nicolas Sarkozy over Ségolène Royal, Lepage refused to participate in the Fillon government because of "loyalty to her convictions". Running as a MoDem candidate in the March 2008 municipal elections of the 12th arrondissement of Paris, she got 9.95% of the vote.

Lepage became Vice-President of the MoDem on 15 June 2008. In February 2009, Bayrou made her head of the Modem list for the Northwest district for the 2009 European elections. She was elected as an MEP with 8.67% of the vote.

Serious tensions emerged between the MoDem and Cap21 when the latter decided to ally itself with Europe Ecologie in many regions for the March 2010 regional elections.

After having criticized Bayrou's strategy and that of the MoDem, which she called "closed in on itself", she announced that she had left the MoDem on 17 March 2010. At the second round of the regional elections, she called on people to vote for the left, except in Acquitaine where a MoDem candidate was viable. During its party congress of 29 May 2010, Cap21 presents itself as an "autonomous party" and its members vote overwhelmingly to leave the MoDem.

=== Member of the European Parliament (June 2009–May 2014) ===
Lepage was elected to the European Parliament in the 2009 election. After the poor score of the MoDem in these elections (8.46%) she called for an alliance in the Parliament between the MoDem and Europe Ecologie.

As an MEP of Cap21, she is part of the ALDE group which includes the MoDem. In July 2009, she became the first vice president of the ENVI Committee (Environment, Public Health and Food Safety) and a substitute member of the ITRE Commission (Industry, Research and Energy) in the European Parliament.

In December 2009, she was the only French MEP in the European Parliament's delegation to the Copenhagen Summit. She expressed dismay at the results of the summit which she considered "a collective failure" to the benefit of "climatoskeptics" and lobbies linked to oil.

Her experience on maritime issues led her to create the "Seas and Coastal Areas" intergroup in the European Parliament. She has presided this intergroup since January 2010.

In June 2009, she protested in front of the Iranian Embassy against the regime alongside UNEF, SOS Racisme, Jack Lang, Nicole Guedj and Marek Halter. With numerous other personalities, she signed a petition "Stop the Burqa and the Veil, Symbols of the Submission of Women and the Islamist Offensive".

After launching the movement "Rassemblement Citoyen" (Citizen Rally), she presented lists under the banner of "Europe Citoyenne" (Citizen Europe) in the 2014 European elections; however, she was not re-elected to the European Parliament, with her list securing only 2.28% of the vote.

=== Recent activity ===
On February 8, 2024, Corinne Lepage and Yann Wehrling announced the launch of the "Positive Ecology & Territories" collective, for the 2024 European elections.

Also in 2024, she opened a case in the European Court of Justice against the European Union's "astonishing" 2023 decision to allow the weedkiller glyphosate to continue to be sold in Europe for another 10 years. The World Health Organization (WHO) had classified the weedkiller as "probably carcinogenic" in 2015, following a study by the International Agency for Research on Cancers.

== Works ==
- Code annoté de procédures administratives contentieuses (1990) ("The Annotated Code of Administrative Litigation Procedures")
- Les audits d'environnement (1992) ("The Environment Audits")
- On ne peut rien faire, madame le Ministre (1998) ("We Can't Do Anything About It, Minister")
- Bien gérer l'environnement, une chance pour l'entreprise (1999) ("Managing the Environment Well, a Business Opportunity")
- La politique de précaution (with François Guéry, 2000) ("Precautionary Politics")
- Oser l'espérance (2001) ("Daring to Hope")
- Santé & Environnement : l'ABCdaire (2005) ("Health and the Environment: the ABCs")
- ECORESP 2006 (2006)
- Déficit public: le patrimoine des français en péril (2011)
