= Marie-France Beaufils =

French politician (born 1946)

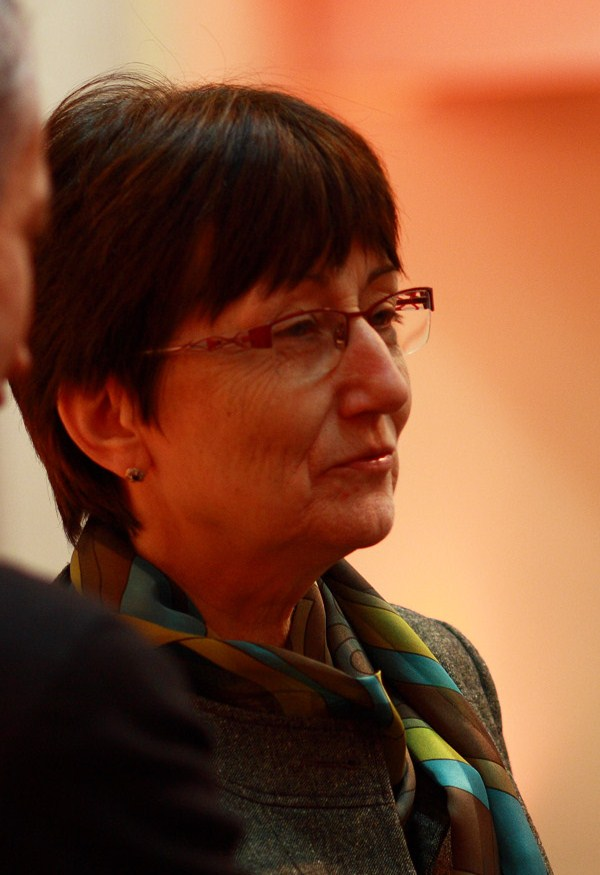
Marie-France Beaufils

Marie-France Beaufils (born 22 November 1946) is a former member of the Senate of France, representing the Indre-et-Loire department from 2001 to 2017. She is a member of the Communist, Republican, and Citizen Group.

== Biography ==
A schoolteacher by profession, Marie-France Beaufils joined the French Communist Party in 1967. She was elected to the municipal council of Saint-Pierre-des-Corps in the 1977 municipal elections and became deputy mayor. Elected as a general councilor in 1982, she became mayor of Saint-Pierre-des-Corps in 1983. She is vice-president of the Tours Plus urban community and has been a member of the Higher Council for Public Rail Transport since 1999.

Re-elected in the March 2001 cantonal elections, she was elected on September 23, 2001, in the senatorial elections under the proportional representation system as a member of the French Communist Party (PCF) and left the general council.

Until January 2007, she was the leader of the anti-liberal collective in Saint-Pierre-des-Corps, which became the committee supporting Marie-George Buffet candidacy. She ran in the 2007 legislative elections in the 3rd district of Indre-et-Loire, receiving 4,362 votes, or 7.48% of the votes cast.

In the 2008 municipal elections, the PS-PCF coalition list she led in Saint-Pierre-des-Corps won in the first round with 57.2% of the vote.

In 2009, she headed the Left Front (France) list for the European elections on June 7 in the Centre-Massif Central constituency, which covers the administrative regions of Centre, Auvergne, and Limousin. Although she obtained 8.07% of the vote, she was not elected.

She ran again in the 2011 senatorial elections in Indre-et-Loire and was re-elected on September 25, 2011.

In July 2016, Marie-France Beaufils published a parliamentary report in which she gave a harsh assessment of the tax credit for competitiveness and employment (CICE), a measure introduced in January 2013 by the Ayrault government. She emphasized that the significant cost to public finances (a shortfall of €19 billion) was considerable, while the effects on employment and competitiveness were highly uncertain.

Marie-France Beaufils did not seek re-election to the Senate in 2017.

On April 4, 2019, at a general meeting of the local branch of the French Communist Party(PCF), she announced that she would not be standing for re-election in the 2020 municipal elections, wishing to see “a new dynamic with a renewed team”.

== Bibliography ==
- Page on the Senate website (in French)
