= Jean-Paul Gauzès =

French politician

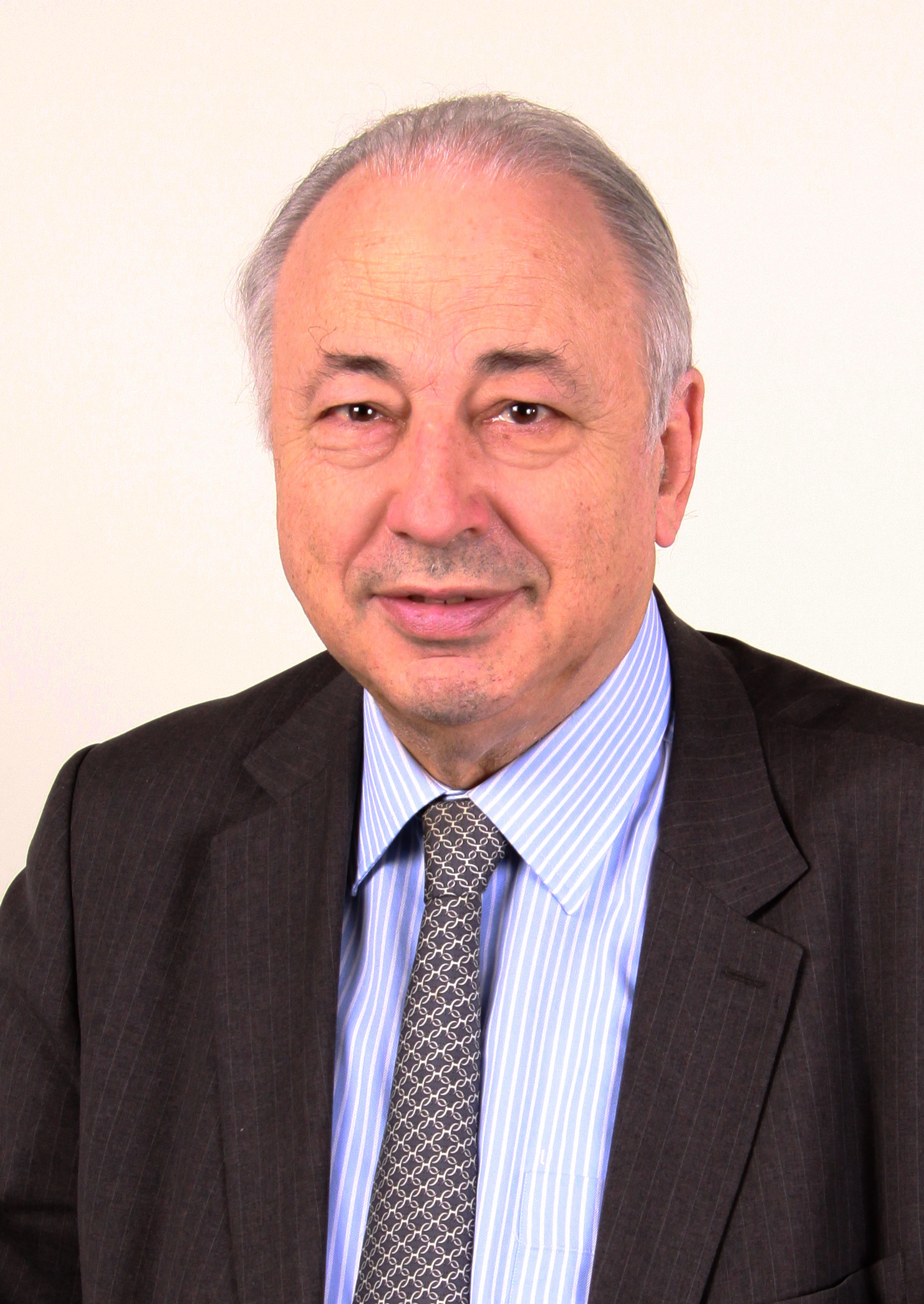

Member of the European Parliament
- In office 2004–2014
- Constituency: North-West France

Personal details
- Born: 1 October 1947 Toulouse, France
- Died: 13 September 2023 (aged 75)
- Party: French: Union for a Popular Movement (UMP); EU: European People's Party (EPP)

Jean-Paul Gauzès (1 October 1947 in Toulouse – 13 September 2023 in Paris) was a French politician of the Union for a Popular Movement, part of the European People's Party. He served as a Member of the European Parliament for the North-West of France from 2004 to 2014.

== Early career ==
After studying economics and law and lecturing in Toulouse, Gauzès moved to Paris in 1972, working in the Ministry of National Education before moving into legal practice. From 1980 until 1994, he worked as a lawyer in the Council of State and in the Court of Appeals.

In 1996, Gauzès was involved in the creation of Dexia. Between 1998 and 2007, he served as the company's director on legal and tax matters in France and worked for Dexia Credit Local, a subsidiary of the bank that lends money to local governments.

== Political career ==
=== Role in national politics ===
In the 1998 French regional elections, Gauzès was one of five mainstream center-right politicians who, having accepted votes from the far-right National Front, were voted into office as regional presidents. This sparked an uproar among their political allies, prompting Gauzès to resign.

=== Member of the European Parliament ===
Gauzès was first elected Member of the European Parliament in the 2004 European elections. For the 2014 elections, he was placed third on the list of UMP candidates in the North-West constituency; he was not re-elected.

Throughout his time in parliament, Gauzès served on the Committee on Economic and Monetary Affairs. In this capacity, he was appointed rapporteur for the Payment Services Directive in 2006 and for the directive on credit rating agencies in 2008. He was a leading negotiator on the Alternative Investment Fund Managers Directive in 2011 and during the talks on new budget-monitoring regulations following the eurozone crisis.

In addition to his committee assignments, Gauzès was a member of the Parliament's delegation with Iran (2004-2009), the countries of south-east Europe (2007-2009) and the Korean Peninsula (2009-2014).

== European Financial Reporting Advisory Group (EFRAG) ==
In 2016, the European Commission proposed Gauzès for the role of President of the European Financial Reporting Advisory Group (EFRAG). Following a hearing, the Committee on Economic and Monetary Affairs confirmed Gauzès’ nomination in May 2016. He chaired EFRAG until the end of his six year mandate, in June 2022.

== Political positions ==
In 2009, Gauzès and Pervenche Berès publicly protested against the nomination of Sharon Bowles as chairwoman of the Committee on Economic and Monetary Affairs. They took issue with the idea of someone from a country that is not part of the eurozone chairing a committee that has, as one of its main responsibilities, regular hearings with the President of the European Central Bank. Under the resulting pressure, Bowles was forced to publicly state her support for the UK replacing the pound with the euro.

In 2011, Gauzès and Burkhard Balz said that a proposal by the Nasdaq OMX Group and Intercontinental Exchange (ICE) to buy NYSE Euronext "poses serious concerns" about the financial stability of the tech-heavy American exchange. Instead they supported the proposed combination of Deutsche Börse and NYSE Euronext, arguing that this would "create a strong and viable European actor with a global outreach and footprint."
