= Ecology at the Centre =

French green political party

Ecology at the Centre Écologie au centre
- President: Jean-Marc Governatori
- Founded: 13 March 2009 (coalition); 28 May 2011 (party)
- Dissolved: 28 May 2011 (coalition)
- Ideology: Green politics
- Political position: Centre
- Colours: Green; Blue
- Members: 2009–2010: Independent Ecological Movement; Ecology Generation; France in Action

Website
- ecologieaucentre.com

Ecology at the Centre (French: Écologie au centre, ÉAC), known as the Independent Ecological Alliance (French: Alliance écologiste indépendante, AEI) until 2022, was a French green political party and former electoral coalition.

The coalition was originally created ahead of the 2009 European Parliament election, and was composed of Antoine Waechter's Independent Ecological Movement (MEI), Jean-Noël Debroise's Ecology Generation (GE), and Jean-Marc Governatori's France in Action (LFA). After MEI and GE's departure from the coalition in 2010, Governatori's LFA took over the name of the coalition in 2011. In the 2022 legislative election, the party's candidates were presented under the name Ecology at the Centre.

Dissolved in Cap Ecologie.

== Coalition ==
=== 2009 European Parliament election ===
- East: Antoine Waechter
- Île-de-France: Jean-Marc Governatori
- Massif Central: Michel Fabre
- North-West: Bernard Frau
- Overseas: Amandine Dalmasso
- South-East: Francis Lalanne
- South-West: Patrice Drevet
- West: Eva Roy

The coalition won 3.63% of the vote nationally and won no seats.

=== 2010 regional elections ===
The Independent Ecological Alliance (AEI), after winning 3.6% in the European elections, is running independent lists in 10 regions. The AEI signed electoral deals with Europe Écologie in Alsace and Midi-Pyrénées, with the MoDem in Auvergne, Franche-Comté, Pays de la Loire and Poitou-Charentes.
