= Massif-central–Centre (European Parliament constituency) =

Former European Parliament constituency

Massif central–Centre
- European Parliament constituency
- Location among the 2014 constituencies

- Shown within France
- Member state: France
- Created: 2004
- MEPs: 6 (2004–2009); 5 (2009–2019)

Until its abolition in 2019, Massif central–Centre was a European Parliament constituency in France. It consisted of the region of Centre-Val de Loire and the former regions of Auvergne, and Limousin.

== Members of the European Parliament ==
Election	MEP (party)	MEP (party)	MEP (party)	MEP (party)	MEP (party)	MEP (party)
2004	Catherine Guy-Quint (PS)	André Laignel (PS)	Bernadette Bourzai (PS)	Brice Hortefeux (UMP)	Marie-Hélène Descamps (UMP)	Janelly Fourtou (UDF)
2005	Catherine Guy-Quint (PS)	André Laignel (PS)	Bernadette Bourzai (PS)	Jean-Pierre Audy (UMP)	Marie-Hélène Descamps (UMP)	Janelly Fourtou (UDF)
2008	Catherine Guy-Quint (PS)	André Laignel (PS)	Jean-Paul Denanot (PS)	Jean-Pierre Audy (UMP)	Marie-Hélène Descamps (UMP)	Janelly Fourtou (UDF)
2009	Henri Weber (PS)	Jean-Paul Besset (EE)	Sophie Auconie (UMP)	Jean-Pierre Audy (UMP)	Catherine Soullie (UMP)	5 seats 2009-2019
2011	Henri Weber (PS)	Jean-Paul Besset (EE)	Sophie Auconie (UMP)	Jean-Pierre Audy (UMP)	Brice Hortefeux (UMP)	5 seats 2009-2019
2014	Jean-Paul Denanot (PS)	Bernard Monot (FN)	Philippe Loiseau (FN)	Angélique Delahaye (UMP)	Brice Hortefeux (UMP)	5 seats 2009-2019
2018	Karine Gloanec Maurin (PS)	Bernard Monot (FN)	Philippe Loiseau (FN)	Angélique Delahaye (UMP)	Brice Hortefeux (UMP)	5 seats 2009-2019

== Results ==
=== 2004 ===
2004 European Parliament election
Party	Votes	%	Seats
Socialist Party	440,249	31.23	3
Union for a Popular Movement	287,085	20.36	2
Union for French Democracy	140,477	9.96	1
National Front	135,929	9.64	–
Movement for France	93,301	6.62	–
The Greens	88,457	6.27	–
French Communist Party	87,654	6.22	–
Lutte Ouvrière–Revolutionary Communist League	38,070	2.70	–
Hunting, Fishing, Nature and Traditions	33,995	2.41	–
France from Below	25,965	1.84	–
Rally of French Taxpayers	15,000	1.06	–
Workers' Party	12,809	0.91	–
National Republican Movement	5,443	0.39	–
Live Better with Europe	2,785	0.20	–
Europe–Democracy–Esperanto	2,159	0.15	–
Alliance Royale	284	0.02	–
Federalist Party	102	0.01	–
F.R.A.N.C.E. - Pôle des Libertés	57	0.00	–
Total	1,409,821	100.00	6
Valid votes	1,409,821	96.02	
Invalid/blank votes	58,500	3.98	
Total votes	1,468,321	100.00	
Registered voters/turnout	3,235,943	45.38	
Source: Minister of the Interior

=== 2009 ===
In the 2009 election, five MEPs were elected from the constituency

2009 European Parliament election
Party	Votes	%	Seats
Union for a Popular Movement	382,632	28.51	3
Socialist Party	238,806	17.79	1
Europe Ecology	182,311	13.58	1
Democratic Movement	109,369	8.15	–
Left Front	108,194	8.06	–
New Anticapitalist Party	73,162	5.45	–
National Front	68,665	5.12	–
Libertas France	65,718	4.90	–
Independent Ecological Alliance	46,351	3.45	–
Party of France	25,294	1.88	–
Republic Arise	19,231	1.43	–
Lutte Ouvrière	18,841	1.40	–
Europe–Democracy–Esperanto	2,633	0.20	–
Newropeans	230	0.02	–
People's Union	229	0.02	–
Alliance Royale	228	0.02	–
Communists	185	0.01	–
Humanist Party	97	0.01	–
Rally for Citizen's Initiative	49	0.00	–
Programme contre la précarité et le sexisme	24	0.00	–
Total	1,342,249	100.00	5
Valid votes	1,342,249	94.34	
Invalid/blank votes	80,498	5.66	
Total votes	1,422,747	100.00	
Registered voters/turnout	3,342,417	42.57	
Source: Minister of the Interior

=== 2014 ===
2014 European Parliament election
Party	Votes	%	Seats
National Front	356,098	24.18	2
Union for a Popular Movement	314,959	21.38	2
Socialist Party	233,079	15.82	1
Union of Democrats and Independents–Democratic Movement	146,482	9.94	–
Left Front	110,087	7.47	–
Europe Ecology – The Greens	101,331	6.88	–
Debout la France	67,729	4.60	–
New Deal	41,905	2.84	–
Independent Ecological Alliance	30,480	2.07	–
Lutte Ouvrière	19,740	1.34	–
Nous Citoyens	15,979	1.08	–
Blank Vote Citizens	15,592	1.06	–
Europe Citoyenne	7,574	0.51	–
Popular Republican Union	4,731	0.32	–
Europe–Democracy–Esperanto	3,390	0.23	–
Feminists for a United Europe	1,016	0.07	–
Pirate Party	560	0.04	–
Communists	462	0.03	–
Real Democracy	369	0.03	–
Alliance Royale	321	0.02	–
Parti pour la décroissance	316	0.02	–
Régions et Peuples Solidaires	245	0.02	–
Force Vie	234	0.02	–
European Federalist Party	190	0.01	–
Syndicat de lutte contre les banques	129	0.01	–
Total	1,472,998	100.00	5
Valid votes	1,472,998	94.82	
Invalid/blank votes	80,396	5.18	
Total votes	1,553,394	100.00	
Registered voters/turnout	3,371,274	46.08	
Source: Minister of the Interior
