= Jean-Marie Beaupuy =

French politician

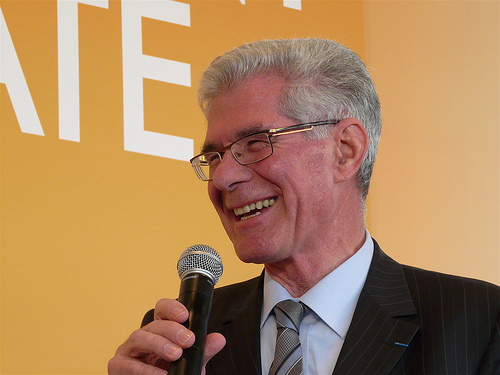
Jean-Marie Beaupuy

Jean-Marie Beaupuy (born 28 November 1943) is a French politician and Member of the European Parliament for the east of France. He is a member of the Union for French Democracy, which is part of the Alliance of Liberals and Democrats for Europe, and sits on the European Parliament's Committee on Regional Development.

He is also a substitute for the Committee on Employment and Social Affairs, a member of the delegation for relations with Australia and New Zealand, a member of the temporary committee on policy challenges and budgetary means of the enlarged Union 2007–2013, and a substitute for the delegation for relations with the countries of South Asia and the South Asian Association for Regional Cooperation and the delegation for relations with the countries of the Andean Community.

== Career ==
- Graduate of the Angers École supérieure for Commercial Studies (1969)
- Founder director of Stratégie Formation (Training Strategy) 1975
- Member of the UDF political bureau
- Deputy mayor of Lyons (1983–2007)
- Vice-Chairman of the Marne Departmental Council (1979–2004)
- Knight of the National Order of Merit
