= Patrick Louis =

French politician (born 1955)

Patrick Louis (born 22 October 1955, Vitry-le-François) is a French politician who served as a Member of the European Parliament for the south-east of France. He is a member of the Movement for France, which is part of the Independence and Democracy group, and sat on the European Parliament's Committee on Transport and Tourism.

He was also a substitute for the Committee on International Trade and a member of the delegations for relations with the Gulf States, including Yemen, for relations with the Mashreq countries, and to the ACP-EU Joint Parliamentary Assembly.

== Career ==
- University teaching qualification in economics and management (1984)
- Visiting lecturer at the Franco-Czech Management Institute in Prague (1993)
- Visiting lecturer at Bucharest (1995)
- Visiting lecturer at the University of Georgia (United States) (1997)
- Visiting lecturer at the University of Minnesota (1991, 1994, 2000)
- Visiting lecturer at the Beirut College of Commerce (2004)
- Examiner at the Institute for Advanced Studies in National Defence
- Lecturer at Jean Moulin University, Lyon
- Administrator, Interregional and Technical Union of Students' Mutual Associations
- MPF regional officer (1994–2002)
- RPF departmental secretary for Rhône (2000)
- MPF regional coordinator for the Rhône-Alpes region
- Member of Rhône-Alpes Regional Council (1998–2004)
- Chairman of the Transport Committee of the Rhône-Alpes Regional Council (1998–1999)
- Member of the TRANSALP public interest group
- Cofounder of the movement 'Combat pour les valeurs' (Combat for Values)
- Le Budgétaire, First, 1989 (collective work)
- Encyclopédie de l'économie et de la gestion, Hachette, 1991 (collective work)
- Knight of the Ordre des Palmes académiques
