= Jean-Louis Cottigny =

French politician

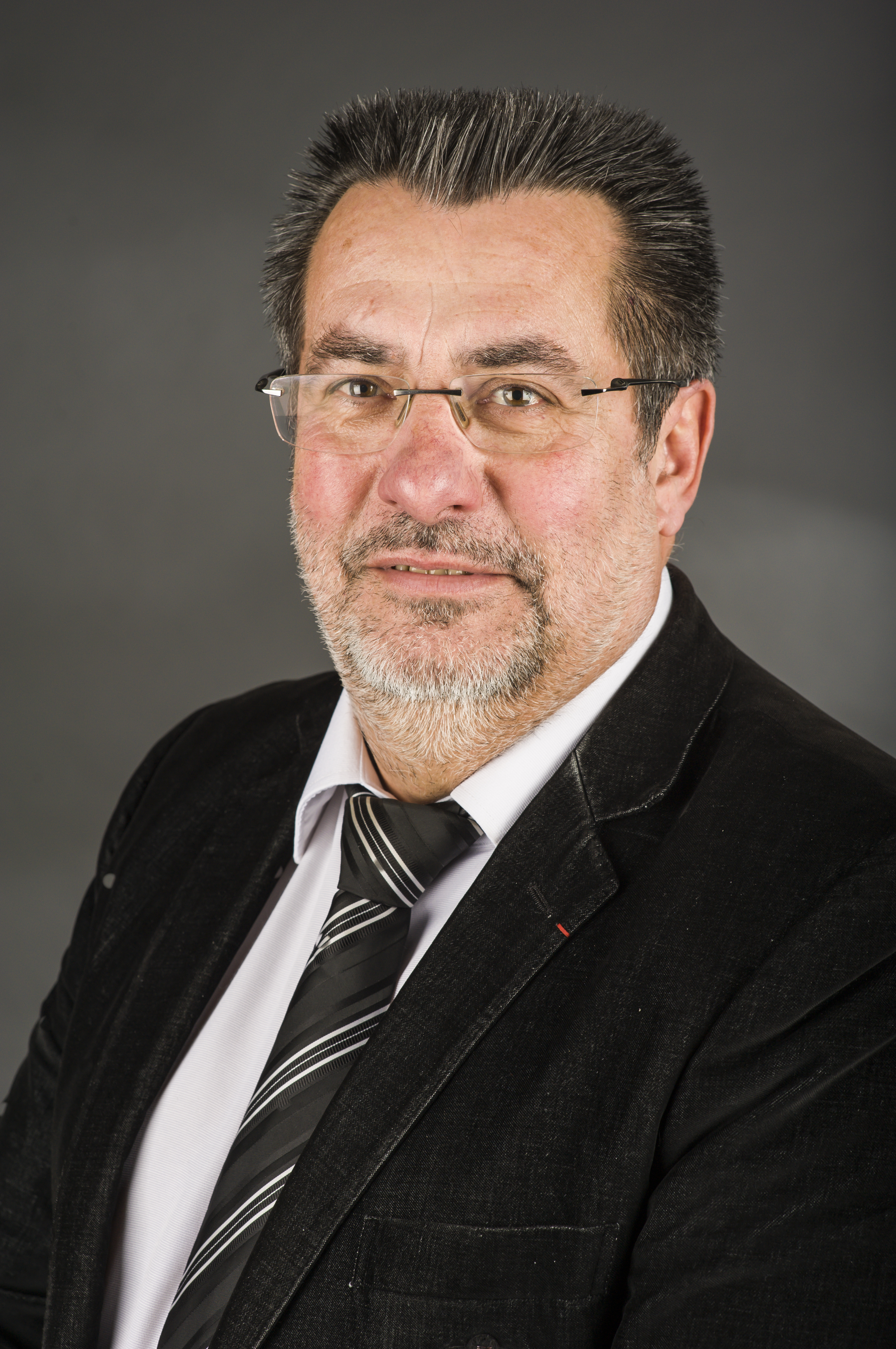
Jean-Louis Cottigny

Jean-Louis Cottigny (born 12 September 1950 in Hesdin, Pas-de-Calais) is a French politician and Member of the European Parliament for the north-west of France. He is a member of the Socialist Party, which is part of the Party of European Socialists, and sits on the European Parliament's Committee on Employment and Social Affairs.

He is also a substitute for the Committee on Transport and Tourism and a member of the delegation for relations with the countries of Central America.

== Career ==
- Worker, then regional assistant (1970–1989)
- Former Chairman of the Arras Industrial Tribunal
- Federal Secretary of the Pas-de-Calais Socialist Party, with responsibility for businesses (1974–1990)
- Socialist Party national secretary with responsibility for businesses (1990–1997)
- Mayor of Beaurains (1989–2004)
- Member of the Pas-de-Calais Departmental Council (1989–2004)
- Member of the European Parliament (1997–1999)
- Knight of the Legion of Honour
