= Carl Lang =

French politician

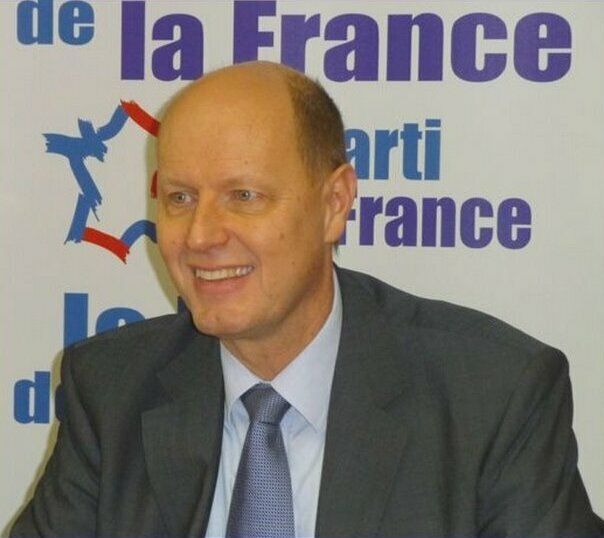
- Carl Lang in 2009

Member of the European Parliament
- In office 1994–2009

Personal details
- Born: 20 September 1957 (age 68) Vernon, France
- Party: National Front; Party of France

Carl Lang (born 20 September 1957) is a French politician and former Member of the European Parliament for the North-West constituency. He was member of the National Front from 1978 to 2008; he is currently president and co-founder of the Party of France (Front National and Party of France are both classified by their opponents as a far-right party).

He was a member of the europarliamentary group "Identity Tradition and Sovereignty" (ITS) in the European Parliament until its dissolving in November 2007. Currently a Non-Inscrit, he is member of the Committee on Employment and Social Affairs.

Carl Lang is also a substitute for the Committee on Fisheries and the Committee on Industry, Research and Energy, a member of the delegation for relations with Belarus, and a substitute for the delegation to the EU–Romania Joint Parliamentary Committee.

Ahead of the 2009 European elections, he announced that he would run a dissident FN list against the official FN list led by Marine Le Pen in the North-West constituency.

== Career ==
- State diploma as a masseur-physiotherapist (1980)
- Secretary-General of the National Front (1988–1995, 1998–2006)
- Member of the Nord-Pas-de-Calais Regional Council (since 1992)
- Member of the European Parliament (since 1994)
