= 2004 European Parliament election in France =

← 1999	13 June 2004	2009 →
- All 74 French seats in the European Parliament
- Turnout: 42.76
Party	Leader	Vote %	Seats	+/–
PS	François Hollande	28.90	31	+13
UMP	Jean-Pierre Raffarin	16.64	17	+5
UDF	François Bayrou	9.81	11	+2
FN	Jean-Marie Le Pen	9.72	9	+4
LV		7.41	6	−3
MPF	Philippe de Villiers	6.67	3	−3
PCF–AOM	Marie-George Buffet	5.88	3	−3
This lists parties that won seats. See the complete results below.

European Parliament elections were held in France on 13 June 2004. The opposition Socialist Party made substantial gains, although this was mainly at the expense of minor parties. The governing Union for a Popular Movement and Union for French Democracy also made gains.

== Seats ==
The elections were conducted in seven regional constituencies in metropolitan France, plus an eighth consisting of all overseas departments and territories. Allocation of seats was by proportional representation, with closed lists and no preferential voting, using the rule of the highest average, with a threshold of 5% of the votes in each.

French districts for elections to the European Parliament. Multiple MEPs are elected by proportional representation from each district. The outre-mer district is not shown.

Constituency	Departements	Seats
Nord-Ouest	Lower Normandy, Upper Normandy, Nord-Pas-de-Calais, Picardy	12
Ouest	Brittany, Pays de la Loire, Poitou-Charentes	10
Est	Alsace, Burgundy, Champagne-Ardenne, Franche-Comté, Lorraine	10
Sud-Ouest	Aquitaine, Languedoc-Roussillon, Midi-Pyrénées	10
Sud-Est	Corsica, Provence-Alpes-Côte d'Azur, Rhône-Alpes	13
Massif-Central – Centre	Auvergne, Centre, Limousin	6
Île-de-France	Île-de-France	14
Outre-Mer (not shown)	French Polynesia, Guadeloupe, French Guiana, Martinique, Mayotte, New Caledonia, Réunion, Saint Pierre and Miquelon, Wallis and Futuna	3

== Results ==
Party	Votes	%	Seats	+/–
Socialist Party	4,960,756	28.90	31	+13
Union for a Popular Movement	2,856,368	16.64	17	+5
Union for French Democracy	2,053,446	11.96	11	+2
National Front	1,684,947	9.81	7	+2
The Greens	1,271,394	7.41	6	–3
Movement for France	1,145,839	6.67	3	–3
French Communist Party–Alliance of the Overseas	1,009,976	5.88	3	–3
Lutte Ouvrière–Revolutionary Communist League	440,134	2.56	0	–5
Hunting, Fishing, Nature, Traditions	297,273	1.73	0	–6
Rally for France	291,234	1.70	0	–13
France from Below	266,538	1.55	0	New
Rally of French Taxpayers	147,943	0.86	0	New
Workers' Party	131,434	0.77	0	New
Radical Party of the Left	121,573	0.71	0	–2
Cap21	98,700	0.57	0	New
UMP dissidents	79,529	0.46	0	New
Independent Ecological Movement	61,457	0.36	0	0
National Republican Movement	53,606	0.31	0	0
Cash Cow Motorist	52,376	0.31	0	New
Europalestine	50,037	0.29	0	New
Live Better with Europe	26,950	0.16	0	New
Europe–Democracy–Esperanto	25,067	0.15	0	New
The Regionalists	9,249	0.05	0	New
Earth Otherwise Nothing	6,222	0.04	0	New
Alliance Royale	5,248	0.03	0	New
Herritarren Zerrenda	5,157	0.03	0	New
New Solidarity	3,129	0.02	0	New
Diversity for Europe	2,807	0.02	0	New
No to Racism	2,578	0.02	0	New
Federalist Party	1,890	0.01	0	New
We are all Europeans	1,210	0.01	0	New
Savoyan League	1,155	0.01	0	New
French Union for National Cohesion	865	0.01	0	New
Action for All	359	0.00	0	New
Party of Social Professionals	300	0.00	0	New
France – Pole of Freedoms	175	0.00	0	New
Jus Cogens	160	0.00	0	New
Humanist Party	158	0.00	0	0
United France	119	0.00	0	New
Independent France	0	0.00	0	New
Total	17,167,358	100.00	78	–9
Valid votes	17,167,358	96.70		
Invalid/blank votes	585,245	3.30		
Total votes	17,752,603	100.00		
Registered voters/turnout	41,518,595	42.76		
Source: France Politique

== Members elected ==
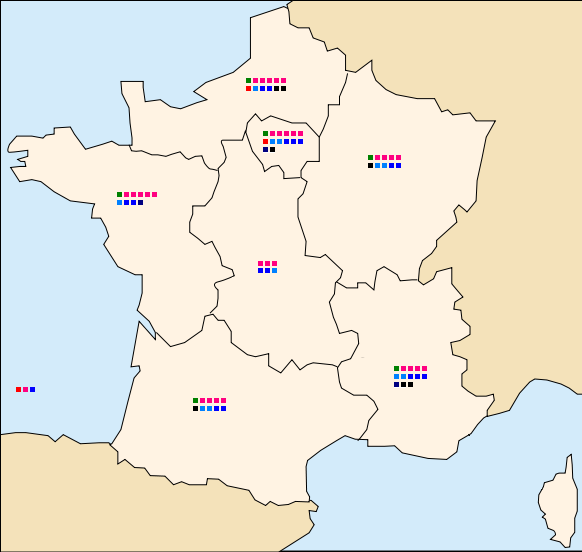
Map showing the number of MEPs and their parties by electoral district. One square represents one seat

=== Nord-Ouest ===
- Jean-Louis Bourlanges (Alliance of Liberals and Democrats for Europe)
- Jean-Louis Cottigny (Party of European Socialists)
- Brigitte Douay (Party of European Socialists)
- Hélène Flautre (Greens-EFA)
- Jean-Paul Gauzes (European People's Party)
- Jacky Henin (European United Left - Nordic Green Left)
- Carl Lang (Non-Inscrits)
- Marie-Noëlle Lienemann (Party of European Socialists)
- Vincent Peillon (Party of European Socialists)
- Tokia Saïfi (European People's Party)
- Chantal Simonot (Non-Inscrits)
- Henri Weber (Party of European Socialists)

=== Ouest ===
- Marie-Hélène Aubert (Greens-EFA)
- Roselyne Bachelot-Narquin (European People's Party)
- Philippe de Villiers (Independence and Democracy)
- Ambroise Guellec (European People's Party)
- Stéphane Le Foll (Party of European Socialists)
- Philippe Morillon (Alliance of Liberals and Democrats for Europe)
- Bernard Poignant (Party of European Socialists)
- Marie-Line Reynaud (Party of European Socialists)
- Yannick Vaugrenard (Party of European Socialists)
- Bernadette Vergnaud (Party of European Socialists)

=== Est ===
- Jean Marie Beaupuy (Alliance of Liberals and Democrats for Europe)
- Joseph Daul (European People's Party)
- Bruno Gollnisch (Non-Inscrits)
- Natalie Griesbeck (Alliance of Liberals and Democrats for Europe)
- Benoît Hamon (Party of European Socialists)
- Adeline Hazan (Party of European Socialists)
- Marie-Anne Isler-Béguin (Greens-EFA)
- Véronique Mathieu (European People's Party)
- Pierre Moscovici (Party of European Socialists)
- Catherine Trautmann (Party of European Socialists)

=== Sud-Ouest ===
- Kader Arif (Party of European Socialists)
- Françoise Castex (Party of European Socialists)
- Jean-Marie Cavada (Alliance of Liberals and Democrats for Europe)
- Christine de Veyrac (European People's Party)
- Alain Lamassoure (European People's Party)
- Anne Laperrouze (Alliance of Liberals and Democrats for Europe)
- Jean-Claude Martinez (Non-Inscrits)
- Robert Navarro (Party of European Socialists)
- Gérard Onesta (Greens-EFA)
- Béatrice Patrie (Party of European Socialists)

=== Sud-Est ===
- Jean-Luc Bennahmias (Greens-EFA)
- Guy Bono (Party of European Socialists)
- Marie-Arlette Carlotti (Party of European Socialists)
- Thierry Cornillet (Alliance of Liberals and Democrats for Europe)
- Claire Gibault (Alliance of Liberals and Democrats for Europe)
- Françoise Grossetête (European People's Party)
- Jean-Marie Le Pen (Non-Inscrits)
- Patrick Louis (Independence and Democracy)
- Michel Rocard (Party of European Socialists)
- Martine Roure (Party of European Socialists)
- Lydia Schenardi (Non-Inscrits)
- Ari Vatanen (European People's Party)
- Dominique Vlasto (European People's Party)

=== Massif-Central – Centre ===
- Bernadette Bourzai (Party of European Socialists)
- Marie-Hélène Descamps (European People's Party)
- Janelly Fourtou (Alliance of Liberals and Democrats for Europe)
- Catherine Guy-Quint (Party of European Socialists)
- Brice Hortefeux (European People's Party)
- André Laignel (Party of European Socialists)

=== Île-de-France ===
- Pervenche Berès (Party of European Socialists)
- Paul-Marie Coûteaux (Independence and Democracy)
- Marielle de Sarnez (Alliance of Liberals and Democrats for Europe)
- Harlem Désir (Party of European Socialists)
- Anne Ferreira (Party of European Socialists)
- Nicole Fontaine (European People's Party)
- Patrick Gaubert (European People's Party)
- Marine Le Pen (Non-Inscrits)
- Bernard Lehideux (Alliance of Liberals and Democrats for Europe)
- Alain Lipietz (Greens-EFA)
- Gilles Savary (Party of European Socialists)
- Pierre Schapira (Party of European Socialists)
- Jacques Toubon (European People's Party)
- Francis Wurtz (European United Left - Nordic Green Left)

=== Outre-mer ===
- Jean-Claude Fruteau (Party of European Socialists)
- Margie Sudre (European People's Party)
- Paul Vergès (European United Left - Nordic Green Left)
