= Marie-Hélène Descamps =

French politician (1938–2020)

Marie-Hélène Descamps (5 July 1938 – 2 August 2020) was a French politician and Member of the European Parliament for Central France. She was a member of the Union for a Popular Movement, part of the European People's Party.
