= Jean-Claude Martinez =

French politician (born 1945)

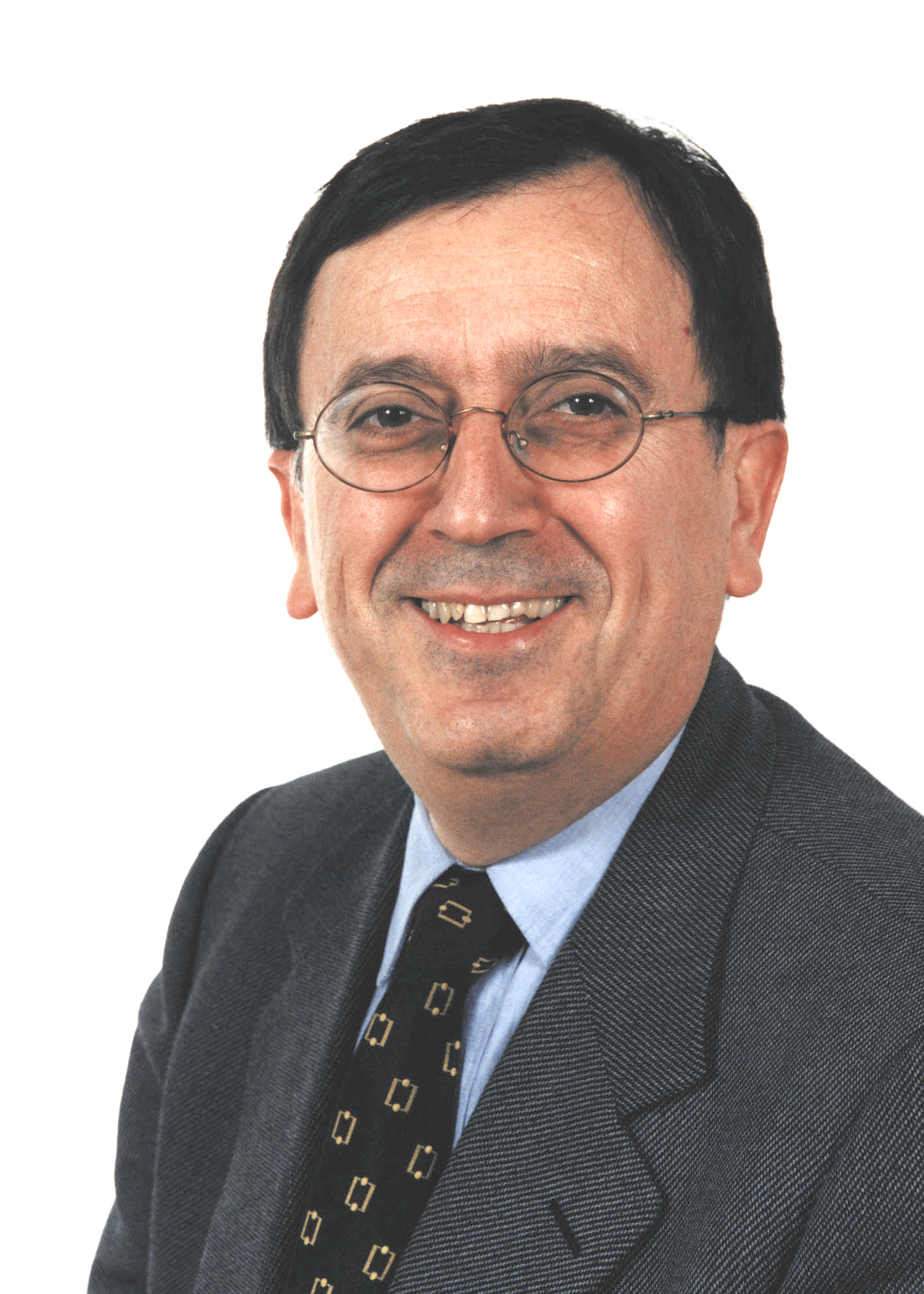
- Martinez in 1994

Member of the European Parliament
- In office 1989–2009
- Preceded by: Claude Autant-Lara

Member of the National Assembly for Hérault
- In office 1986–1988

Personal details
- Born: 30 July 1945 (age 80); Sète, France
- Political party: National Front

Jean-Claude Martinez (born 30 July 1945) is a French politician who was a Member of the European Parliament for the south-west of France. He was a member and a vice-president of the Front National, and was among the Non-Inscrits until the 2007 formation of the Identity, Tradition, Sovereignty Group in the European Parliament. He sits on its Committee on Agriculture and Rural Development.

Martinez is also a substitute for the Committee on Budgets, a member of the delegation to the Euro-Mediterranean Parliamentary Assembly, and a substitute for the delegation for relations with the countries of Central America.

Martinez was part of the "TSM" current inside the FN (Tout sauf Mégret, Anybody But Mégret) during the 1990s crisis, along with Samuel Maréchal, Marine Le Pen, Roger Holeindre, the Catholic current represented by Bernard Antony and Bruno Gollnisch, and Martine Lehideux.

== Career ==
- Postgraduate teaching qualification in law (1975)
- Course director, ÉNA (National School of Administration), Morocco (1976–1980)
- Professor at the faculty of law of Panthéon-Assas University since 1983
- Deputy Chairman of the National Front
- Member of a regional council (1992–2004)
- Former member of Montpellier Municipal Council
- Member of the National Assembly (1986–1988)
- Member of the European Parliament (1989-2009)

== Bibliography ==
- Mohammed VI, le Roi stabilisateur, Ed. J-C Godefroy, 2015
- Demain 2021, with Jean-Pierre Thiollet, Ed. Godefroy de Bouillon, 2004
- La faucille ou le McDo, Lettres du Monde, 2003
- La piste américaine, Lettres du Monde, 2002
- L'Europe folle, Presses bretonnes, 1996
- La fraude fiscale, "Que sais-je", Presses universitaires de France, 1990
- L'impôt sur le revenu en question, Litec, 1989
- Les cent premiers jours de Jean-Marie Le Pen à l'Élysée, Lettre du Monde, 1988
- Lettre ouverte aux contribuables, Albin Michel, 1985
