= Tokia Saïfi =

French politician (born 1959)

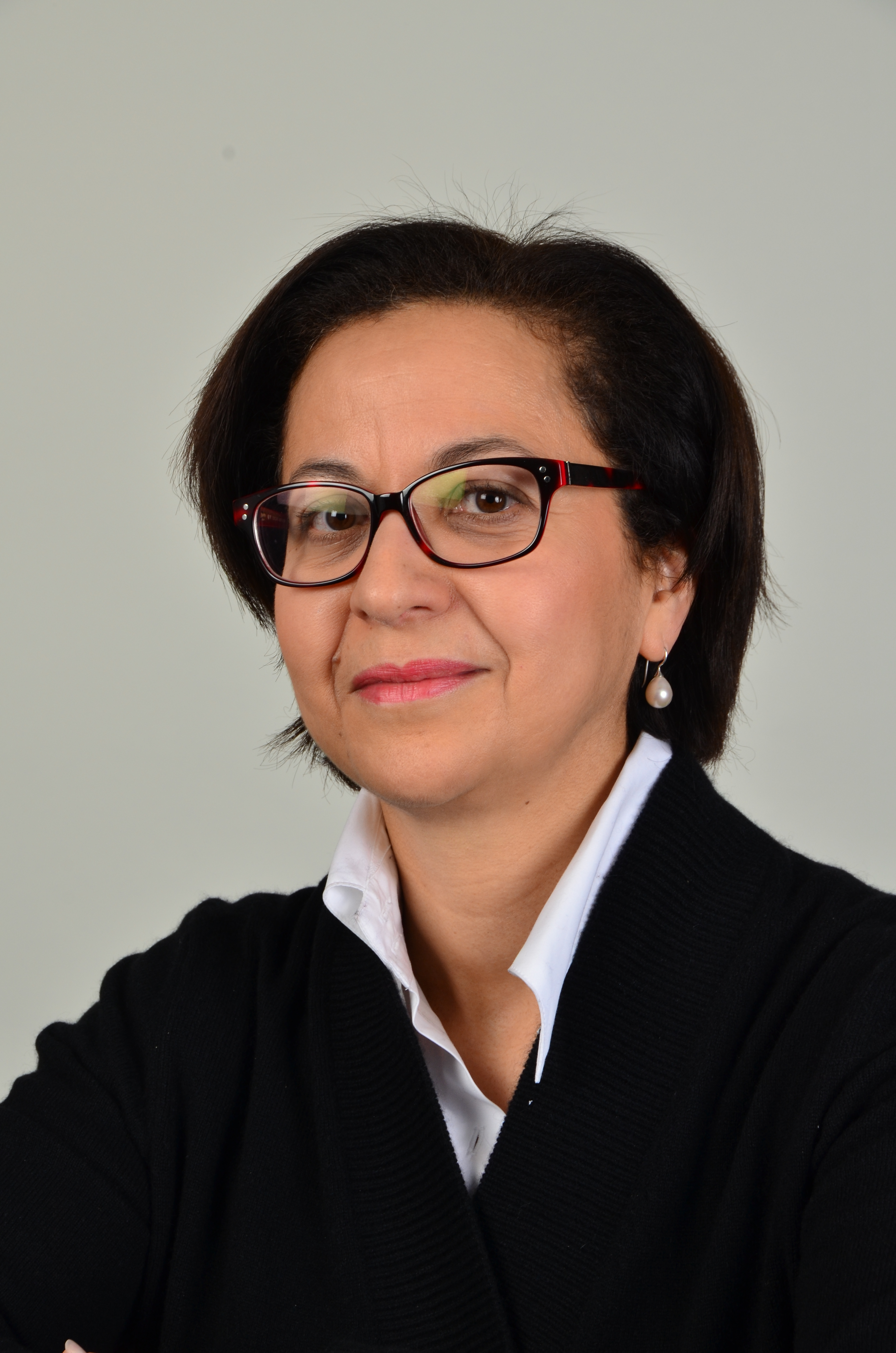
Saïfi in February 2014

Tokia Afféda Saïfi (born 11 July 1959 in Hautmont, Nord) is a French politician who served as Member of the European Parliament for the North-West of France from 1999 until 2019. She is a member of the Radical party and of the Union for a Popular Movement, part of the European People's Party. She is a former member of Ecology Generation.

== Political career ==
Saïfi was first elected as Member of the European Parliament in the 1999 elections. During her first term in parliament, she first served on the Committee on Employment and Social Affairs. Following the 2004 elections, she joined the Committee on International Trade; from 2014 until 2019, she served as the committee's vice-chairwoman under the leadership of Bernd Lange. In this capacity, she was the parliament's rapporteur on trade and investment-driven growth for developing countries as well as on human rights and social and environmental standards in international trade agreements.

In addition to her committee assignments, Saïfi was the vice-chairwoman of the parliament's delegation for relations with the Maghreb countries and the Arab Maghreb Union and a member of the delegation to the Parliamentary Assembly of the Mediterranean. In this capacity, she took part in the EU's observer mission for the 2012 legislative elections in Algeria.

== Political positions ==
In the Republicans’ 2016 presidential primaries, Saïfi endorsed Alain Juppé as the party's candidate for the office of President of France.

== Bibliography ==
- "Tokia SAÏFI" European Parliament biography.
