= Jacky Hénin =

French politician (born 1960)

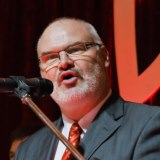

Member of the European Parliament
- In office 2004–2014

Mayor of Calais
- In office 2000–2008
- Preceded by: Jean-Jacques Barthe
- Succeeded by: Natacha Bouchart

Personal details
- Born: 12 November 1960 (age 65) Douai, France
- Party: French Communist Party
- Education: Lille University of Science and Technology

Jacky Hénin (born 12 November 1960) is a French politician and Member of the European Parliament for the north-west of France. He is a member of the French Communist Party, which is part of the European United Left–Nordic Green Left group, and sits on the European Parliament's Committee on International Trade.

He is also member of the Committee on Industry, Research and Energy and a substitute for the delegation for relations with Belarus.

== Career ==
- University diploma in business and administrative management (1982)
- Member of the French Communist Party national council
- Mayor of Calais (until 2008)
- Chairman of the Calaisis Urban Area Community Council
- Chairman, SEVADEC intercommunal services
