= Hélène Flautre =

French politician (born 1958)

Hélène Flautre (born 29 July 1958 in Bapaume) is a French politician who served as a Member of the European Parliament from 1999 until 2014, representing the North West of France. She is a member of the Europe Écologie–The Greens, part of the European Greens. She was first elected in 1999.

In parliament, Flautre chaired the EU-Turkey Joint Parliamentary Committee and observed the trials of activists Pınar Selek and Büşra Ersanlı.
