= 2014 European Parliament election in France =

- 24–25 May 2014
- All 74 French seats in the European Parliament
- Turnout: 42.43%
Party	Leader	Vote %	Seats	+/–
FN	Marine Le Pen	24.86	24	+21
UMP	Jean-François Copé	20.81	20	−10
PS–PRG	Jean-Christophe Cambadélis	13.98	13	−1
UDI–MoDem	François Bayrou	9.94	7	+1
EELV	Emmanuelle Cosse	8.95	6	−7
FG–AOM	Jean-Luc Mélenchon	6.61	4	−1
This lists parties that won seats. See the complete results below.

The 2014 European Parliament election in France for the election of the 8th delegation from France to the European Parliament took place on 24 May 2014 in the overseas territories of France, and on 25 May 2014 in metropolitan France. The number of seats allocated to France increased to 74, compared to 72 in the 2009 election, as a result of the 2013 reapportionment of seats in the European Parliament.

The members of the European Parliament for France, 2014–2019 were elected.

This was the first time the National Front won first place in a European parliament election. They have won every election since, as of 2024.

== Previous (2009–2014) MEPs by European Political Group ==
Key to the Political Groups in the European Parliament (France)
National party	Seats/74	EP group	Seats/754
Union for a Popular Movement	24	European People's Party	270
Union of Democrats and Independents	6	European People's Party	270
Europe Ecology – The Greens	15	The Greens–European Free Alliance	59
Party of the Corsican Nation	1	The Greens–European Free Alliance	59
Socialist Party	13	Socialists & Democrats	189
Democratic Movement	5	Alliance of Liberals and Democrats for Europe	85
CAP 21	1	Alliance of Liberals and Democrats for Europe	85
Left Front	5	European United Left–Nordic Green Left	34
National Front	3	Non-Inscrits	
Movement for France	1	Europe of Freedom and Democracy	35

== Opinion polls ==
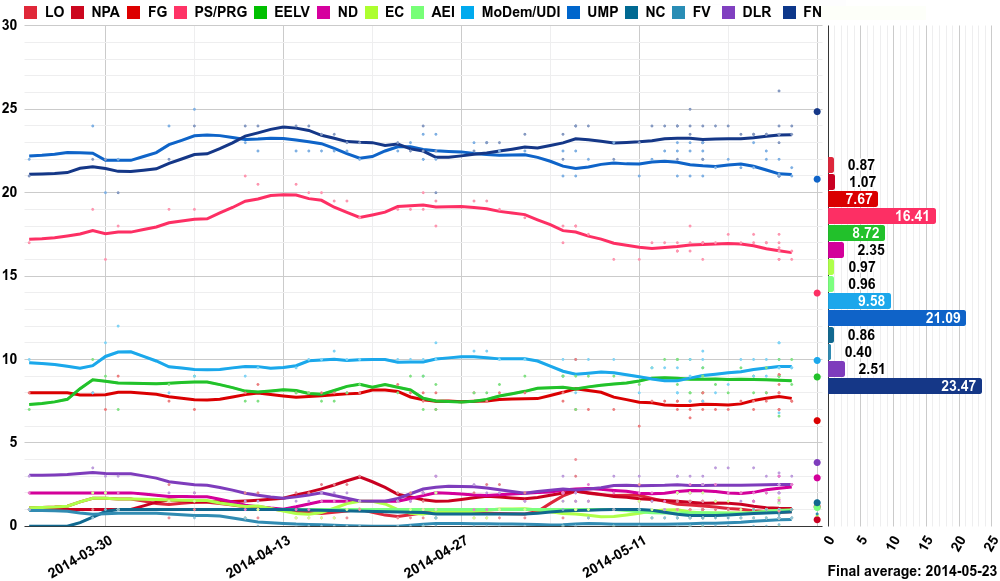

== Results ==
Party	Votes	%	Seats	+/–
National Front	4,712,461	24.86	24	+21
Union for a Popular Movement	3,943,819	20.81	20	–10
Socialist Party–Radical Party of the Left	2,650,357	13.98	13	–1
Union of Democrats and Independents–Democratic Movement	1,884,565	9.94	7	+1
Europe Ecology	1,696,442	8.95	6	–8
Left Front–Alliance of the Overseas	1,252,730	6.61	4	–1
Debout la République	724,441	3.82	0	0
New Deal	549,734	2.90	0	New
Nous Citoyens	266,343	1.41	0	New
Lutte Ouvrière	222,491	1.17	0	0
Independent Ecological Alliance	211,759	1.12	0	0
Force Vie	139,900	0.74	0	New
Citizen Europe	127,849	0.67	0	New
Blank Vote Citizens	110,090	0.58	0	New
Brittany Movement and Progress–Breton Party	83,041	0.44	0	New
Popular Republican Union	76,907	0.41	0	New
New Anticapitalist Party	74,770	0.39	0	0
Régions et Peuples Solidaires	65,054	0.34	0	-1
Pirate Party	39,338	0.21	0	New
Europe–Democracy–Esperanto	33,115	0.17	0	0
Feminists for a United Europe	27,119	0.14	0	New
European Federalist Party	17,812	0.09	0	New
Cannabis Without Borders	7,176	0.04	0	0
Communists	4,547	0.02	0	0
Europe – Degrowth	4,638	0.02	0	0
Real Democracy	4,450	0.02	0	New
France Wakes Up	4,444	0.02	0	New
For a Free Europe	4,334	0.02	0	New
United Europe	3,766	0.02	0	New
Alliance Royale	3,127	0.02	0	0
Together for a Fair Europe	1,400	0.01	0	New
Anti-Replacement List	1,337	0.01	0	New
Radically Citizen	1,291	0.01	0	New
European Party	945	0.00	0	New
Occitania, for a Generation of Peoples	877	0.00	0	New
Reunionese Citizen Movement	827	0.00	0	New
Libertarian Program for an Exemplary Europe against Sexism and Precariousness	499	0.00	0	0
Socialist Alternative Movement	543	0.00	0	New
National Awakening Movement	382	0.00	0	New
For a Europe Useful to the French	355	0.00	0	New
Europe of Marrakech to Istanbul	234	0.00	0	New
Ultramarines, Thank You!	225	0.00	0	New
Syndicate of Struggle Against Banks	129	0.00	0	New
Mayaud hors bords	98	0.00	0	New
Total	18,955,761	100.00	74	0
Valid votes	18,955,761	95.99		
Invalid/blank votes	792,132	4.01		
Total votes	19,747,893	100.00		
Registered voters/turnout	46,544,712	42.43		
Source: France Politique

=== by electoral division ===
Results by departement

Results by communes (Metropolitan France)

National Front (FN)
Union for a Popular Movement (UMP)
Socialist Party / Radical Party of the Left (PS) / (PRG)
Miscellaneous left
The Alternative (L'Alternative)
Europe Écologie (EE)
Left Front (FG)
Regionalist parties
