= 2011 French Socialist Party presidential primary =

2011 Socialist Party presidential primary
- 9 and 16 October 2011
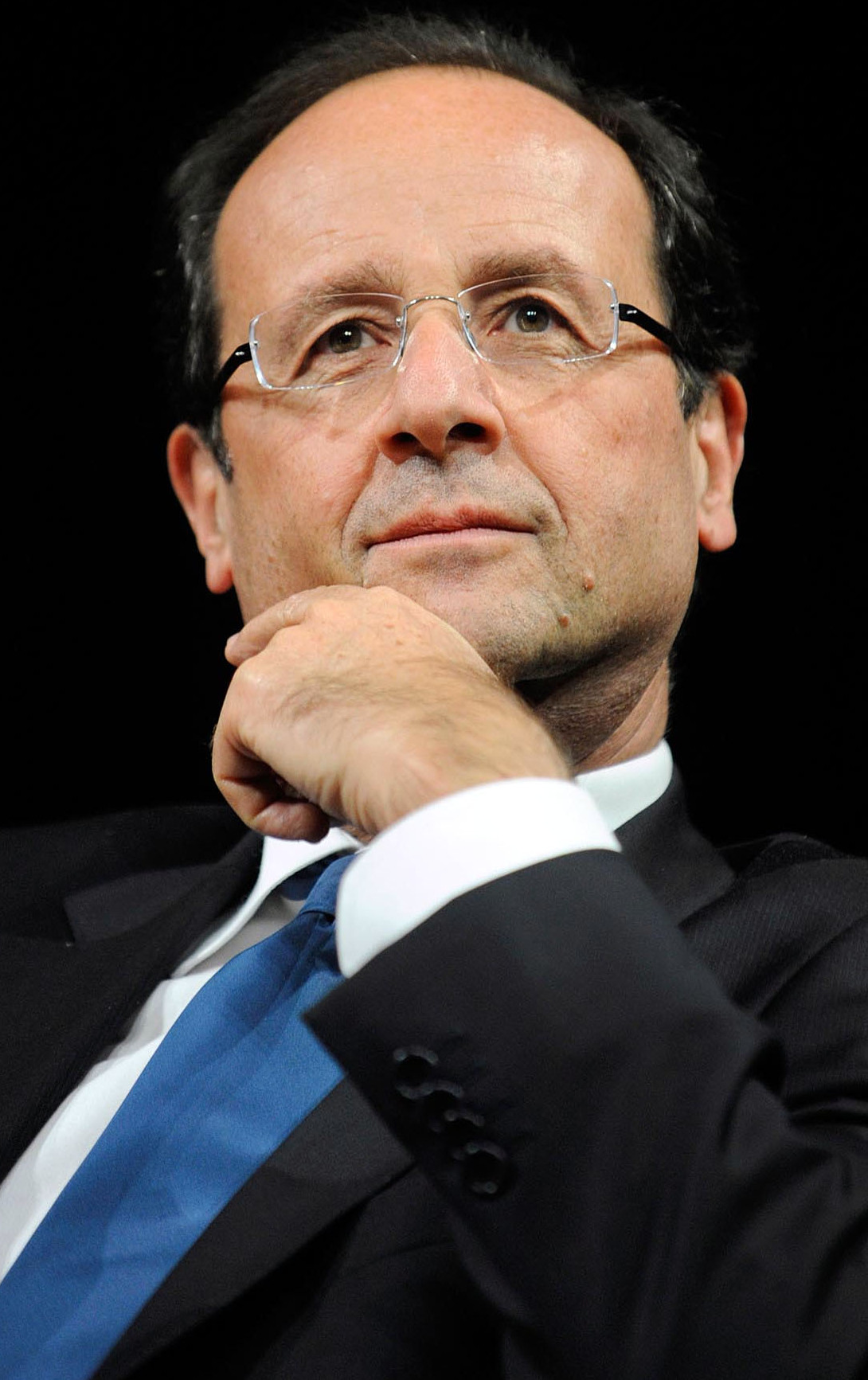

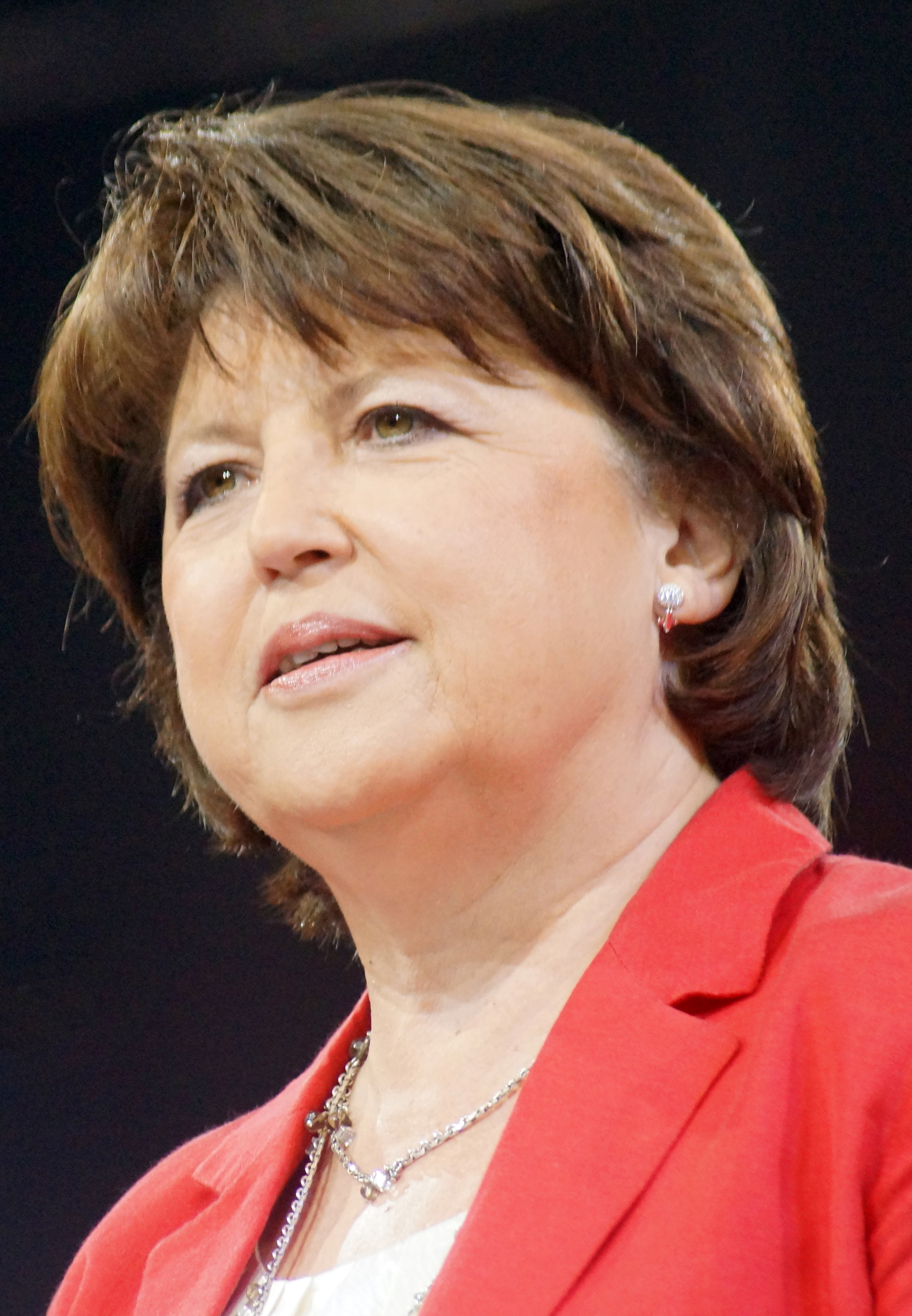
Nominee	François Hollande	Martine Aubry
Party	PS	PS
Popular vote	1,038,188	806,168
Share	39.17%	30.42%
Popular vote (runoff)	1,607,268	1,233,899
Share (runoff)	56.57%	43.43%
- Results of the first round by department and region

- Results of the second round by department and region
Previous Socialist nominee
Ségolène Royal
Socialist nominee
François Hollande

The 2011 French Socialist Party presidential primary was the first open primary (primaires citoyennes) of the French Socialist Party and Radical Party of the Left for selecting their candidate for the 2012 presidential election. The filing deadline for primary nomination papers was fixed at 13 July 2011 and six candidates competed in the first round of the vote. On election day, 9 October 2011, no candidate won 50 percent of the vote, and the two candidates with the most votes contested a runoff election on 16 October 2011. François Hollande ultimately won the primary, defeating Martine Aubry.

== Background ==
After the Socialist Party presidential primary of 1995 and the Socialist Party presidential primary of 2006 restricted to active members of the French Socialist Party, the principle of a primary open to all supporters of the Left for the 2012 race for the presidency was approved by the members of the Socialist Party in October 2009.

The left-leaning think tank Terra Nova proposed the idea of an open primary for the Socialist Party in 2008, although the idea had also been pursued in the previous election cycle by Roger-Gérard Schwartzenberg of the Radical Party of the Left (PRG), who wrote a letter to the editor on 14 September 2004 for the newspaper Le Monde. Schwartzenberg later introduced a bill on 28 February 2006 in the National Assembly (lower chamber) which would have outlined rules for open partisan primaries in French presidential elections.

=== Involvement of Dominique Strauss-Kahn ===
At the beginning of May 2011, Dominique Strauss-Kahn, at that time managing director of the International Monetary Fund (IMF), was the opinion polls' clear favorite to become the Socialist Party candidate for the 2012 French presidential election, as well as for winning the presidency itself. There was controversy over the so-called Porschegate affair when he was pictured stepping into a €100,000 Porsche car, giving rise to criticism of his affluent lifestyle and to accusations of "champagne socialism". Nevertheless, it seemed certain that he would return to France and bid for the presidency in 2012.

However, on 14 May 2011, Strauss-Kahn was arrested in New York on charges of the sexual assault and attempted rape of a hotel room attendant. He was obliged to resign his IMF post and it was accepted at the time that he could not be expected to take any part in the Socialist Party primary.

Nevertheless, on 1 July 2011, there came a marked sea-change in Strauss-Kahn's fortunes when he was released on his own recognizance from house-arrest and bail at a court-hearing requested by the prosecution. This followed a letter sent by the New York District Attorney to Strauss-Kahn's defence lawyers disclosing information about the room attendant which appeared to call into question her credibility.

Strauss-Kahn's release led to immediate speculation of an eventual return to politics, perhaps even participation in the primary. The Paris politician and advocate of gender equality Michèle Sabban asked that the primary be suspended to discuss the possibility of Strauss-Kahn's participation.

At 13 July 2011, the closing date for nominations, Strauss-Kahn had not declared his candidacy.

The charges against Strauss-Kahn were dismissed on 23 August 2011. The prevailing view in the media was that he nevertheless could not make an immediate return to politics and his chances of being nominated as the 2012 Socialist candidate were effectively dead. An opinion poll conducted by CSA on 23/24 August showed that 80% of the French people (77% among supporters of the Left) did not want Strauss-Kahn to contest the Socialist candidacy, while a majority further did not want him to play any part in the forthcoming presidential election or to participate in any eventual Socialist government.

On 18 September 2011, in a televised interview, Strauss-Kahn confirmed he would not be a candidate and would not play any role in the Socialist primaries.

== Voting procedures ==
=== Calendar ===
Nominations for the candidacy were opened on 28 June 2011 and closed on 13 July 2011, with first round election to take place on 9 October 2011 and potential second round election on 16 October 2011 (respectively 8 October 2011 and 15 October 2011 for French territories in the Americas and the Eastern Pacific).

=== Conditions ===
Unlike previous Socialist Party primaries, this was the first primary to be open to the general public. In order to participate to the open primary, voters had to meet the following conditions:

- be registered in the French electoral lists before 31 December 2010 (or for French persons under 18: be 18 at the time of the 2012 presidential election, or be a member of Socialist Party (PS), Radical Party of the Left (PRG), Young Socialist Movement (MJS), or Young Radicals of the Left (JRG); foreigners will be able to vote if they are members of PS, PRG, MJS, or JRG);
- pay a contribution of minimum €1;
- sign a charter pledging to the values of the Left: "freedom, equality, fraternity, secularism, justice, solidarity and progress".

== Candidates ==
The following candidates participated in the open primary:

Name, age	Details and notes
Martine Aubry (61) (campaign)	Mayor of Lille; Former minister and deputy prime minister in Lionel Jospin's cabinet; Party leader; In 2010 the principal contenders, Martine Aubry, Laurent Fabius and Dominique Strauss-Kahn, agreed between themselves the so-called "Marrakech pact" (pacte de Marrakech) whereby each undertook eventually to give way to the candidate best placed in the opinion polls, which at that time was Strauss-Kahn. The final candidate would be announced a few days before the deadline for nominations, towards the end of June 2011. On 3 May 2011, Le Nouvel Observateur reported that Aubry had told her closest supporters she would not be putting her name forward and would support Strauss-Kahn, the clear favorite in the opinions polls. Aubry denied the story, visibly upset, saying that France expected something different. Several days later, Stauss-Kahn's arrest on charges of sexual assault and attempted rape revived interest in her candidacy. On 22 May Aubry said she would accept her responsibilities when the time came, without nevertheless putting her name forward at the same time. Aubry officially declared her candidacy on 28 June, the day nominations opened. Support Fmr. Prime Ministers : Laurent Fabius, Pierre Mauroy; Fmr. Ministers : Claude Bartolone, Robert Chapuis, Jacques Delors, Tony Dreyfus, Henri Emmanuelli, Jean Glavany, Élisabeth Guigou, Charles Josselin, Jack Lang, Marylise Lebranchu, Marie-Noëlle Lienemann, Martin Malvy, Alain Richard, René Souchon, Catherine Tasca; MP's, mayors and presidents of regional or general councils: Jean-Claude Antonini, Alain Anziani, Arlette Arnaud-Landau, David Assouline, Jacques Auxiette, Gérard Bapt, Christian Bataille, Marie-Noëlle Battistel, Laurent Beauvais, Gisèle Biémouret, Patrick Bloche, Jean-Michel Boucheron, Christophe Bouillon, Jean-Claude Boulard, François Brottes, Jean-Michel Boucheron, Pierre Bourguignon, Pascal Buchet, Jean-Christophe Cambadélis, Alain Cacheux, Jean-Paul Chanteguet, Gilles Cocquempot, Pierre Cohen, Catherine Coutelle, Pascale Crozon, Daniel Delaveau, François Deluga, Gilles Demailly, Harlem Désir, Michel Destot, Michel Dinet, Jean-Pierre Dufau, Marie-Marguerite Dufay, Laurence Dumont, Jean-Louis Dumont, Yves Durand, Philippe Duron, Olivier Dussopt, Christian Eckert, Corinne Erhel, Martine Faure, Hervé Féron, Pierre Forgues, Jean Gaubert, Catherine Génisson, Samia Ghali, Daniel Goldberg, David Habib, Adeline Hazan, Jean-Paul Huchon, Liem Hoang Ngoc, Sandrine Hurel, Jean-Louis Idiart, Françoise Imbert, Michel Issindou, Serge Janquin, Henri Jibrayel, Régis Juanico, Marietta Karamanli, Conchita Lacuey, François Lamy, Philippe Lavaud, Dominique Lefebvre, Patrick Lemasle, Catherine Lemorton, Jean-Claude Leroy, François Loncle, Jean Mallot, Hélène Mandroux, Marie-Lou Marcel, Marie-Claude Marchand, Jean-René Marsac, Philippe Martin, Martine Martinel, Frédérique Massat, Didier Mathus, Alain Maurice, Rachel Mazuir, Kléber Mesquida, Jean Michel, Jean-Pierre Michel, Pierre-Alain Muet, Alain Néri, Christian Paul, Germinal Peiro, Jean-Luc Perat, Marie-Line Reynaud, Marcel Rogemont, Catherine Tasca, Michel Vergnier, André Vézinhet, Alain Vidalies; Others politicians: Dominique Dupilet, Benoît Hamon, Anne Hidalgo, Patrick Jeanne, Gilles Pargneaux, Association des JSK ('Les jeunes avec Strauss-Kahn'); Non-political personalities: Jamel Debbouze, Bernard-Henri Lévy, Karl Lagerfeld, Philippe Sollers.
Jean-Michel Baylet (65)	President of the General Council of Tarn-et-Garonne; Senator; Former minister; President of Radical Party of the Left; Jean-Michel Baylet officially declared his candidacy on 6 July 2011. Support Fmr. Ministers: Roger-Gérard Schwartzenberg MP's, mayors and presidents of regional or general councils: Chantal Berthelot (PSG), Gérard Charasse, Paul Giacobbi, Annick Girardin, Joël Giraud, Albert Likuvalu (PS Wallis et Futuna), Jeanny Marc (GUSR), Dominique Orliac, Sylvia Pinel, Chantal Robin-Rodrigo, Yvon Collin, Nicolas Alfonsi, François Vendasi, Raymond Vall, Anne-Marie Escoffier, François Fortassin, Françoise Laborde, Jacques Mézard, Jean Milhau, Jean-Pierre Plancade. Others politicians: Non-political personalities:
François Hollande (57)	President of the General Council of Corrèze; Member of Parliament; Former party leader; François Hollande officially declared his candidacy on 31 March 2011 following his re-election as President of the General Council of Corrèze. During the pre-primary phase of the campaign, Hollande appeared to be the main challenger to Dominique Strauss-Kahn, the opinion polls' favorite. He said he wanted to be an "ordinary president" (président normal) and made several trips to the provinces. Hollande's ratings in the opinions polls were continuing to grow when Stauss-Kahn was arrested on charges of sexual assault and attempted rape. Once considered the favorite, Hollande faced a challenge from Martine Aubry's rise in the opinion polls and over criticisms of his record as a former leader of the party and his lack of ministerial experience. Support Fmr. Prime Ministers: Fmr. Ministers: Michel Delebarre, Roland Dumas, Jean-Pierre Jouyet, Michel Sapin, Catherine Trautmann; MP's, mayors and presidents of regional or general councils: Kader Arif, Jean-Paul Bachy, Jean-Pierre Bel, Claude Bérit-Débat, Jacques Bigot, Maryvonne Blondin, Jean-Paul Bret, Gérard Collomb, Bernard Combes, François Cuillandre, Bernard Derosier, Guy Ferez, Aurélie Filippetti, Ronan Kerdraon, Jean-Yves Le Drian, Stéphane Le Foll, Bruno Le Roux, Jacques Mahéas, Michel Moyrand, Bernard Poignant, François Rebsamen, Alain Rousset, André Vallini; Others politicians: Joël-Guy Batteux, Malek Boutih, Marie-Arlette Carlotti, Faouzi Lamdaoui, Martine Roure. Non-political personalities:
Arnaud Montebourg (49)	President of the General Council of Saône-et-Loire; Member of Parliament; Party secretary responsible for renewal (chargé de la rénovation); Arnaud Montebourg, who as party secretary responsible for renewal set up the 2011 open primary, officially declared his candidacy on 20 November 2010. Montebourg described his candidacy as a "program for transformation" and advocated the establishment of a Sixth Republic. Announcing his candidacy, he said: "Faced with the wasteland that our political system has become, we must have the courage to build a new democracy that will help us achieve the change we seek. That is what I propose we should build together." Questioned on whether he would continue if Dominique Strauss-Kahn entered the race, he said he was not putting himself up against other candidates but running as a bearer of fresh ideas, adding enigmatically that if the end goal was victory, then he was a winning candidate. Support Fmr. Prime Ministers: Fmr. Ministers: MP's, mayors and presidents of regional or general councils: Geneviève Gaillard, Eric Gautier, Jean Launay, Gilbert Le Bris, Thierry Mandon, Christiane Taubira; Others politicians: Non-political personalities: Emmanuel Todd.
Ségolène Royal (58)	President of the Regional Council of Poitou-Charentes; Former minister and Member of Parliament; Party candidate for the 2007 French presidential election; On 29 November 2010, Ségolène Royal confided to La Nouvelle République du Centre-Ouest that she would be a candidate. She said: "I've thought about it a long time and taken lots of advice. The time has come now to say clearly and simply that my answer is 'yes'. I know from experience that it takes more than just a few months to get together and prepare. Who can fail to see that the Right are already campaigning? At any rate they're not trying to hide it." Her statement came as a surprise to most observers because Martine Aubry had suggested just a few days before that she had reached an agreement with Royal, extending Aubry's already existing pact with Dominique Strauss-Kahn, along the lines proposed by Royal herself some six months earlier. However, Royal denied there had ever been a pact between them. On 26 June 2011, two days before the opening date for nominations, Royal officially announced her candidacy during a meeting at Arçais in Poitou-Charentes. She was selected in 2006 as party candidate for the 2007 French presidential election. She won the primary by a large margin, gaining 61% of the votes cast, running against Strauss-Kahn and Laurent Fabius. She later lost the presidential election to conservative candidate Nicolas Sarkozy on 6 May 2007, obtaining 47% of the vote in the runoff. Support Fmr. Prime ministers : Fmr. Ministers: Jean-Louis Bianco, Louis Mermaz, Jean-Jack Queyranne; MP's, mayors and presidents of regional or general councils: Gilbert Annette, Delphine Batho, Dominique Bertinotti, Maxime Bono, Danielle Bousquet, Jean-Michel Clément, Jean-François Dauré, Michèle Delaunay, Guillaume Garot Gaëtan Gorce, Bernard Lesterlin, Serge Letchimy,, Louis Mermaz, Catherine Quéré; Others politicians: Sophie Bouchet-Petersen, Béatrice Patrie, Najat Vallaud-Belkacem; Non-political personalities: Cali, Françoise Degois, Edgar Morin.
Manuel Valls (49)	Mayor of Évry; Member of Parliament; Manuel Valls was amongst the first to announce his candidacy. On 14 June 2009, he said: "If it turns out that there isn't a better socialist out there than me to preside over the renewal of the party – and so far I don't see one – then I'll do it myself ... Obviously, in that case I'll be a candidate to represent the socialists and the Left in the presidential election." He confirmed his remarks on 9 April 2010 saying: "In expressing my desire to run for the 2012 presidential election, I hope to create conditions for a new deal for our nation." On 2 January 2011 he said he believed that if the Left returned to power in 2012, it should do away with the 35-hour week to allow the French to work harder. Valls supported Dominique Strauss-Kahn until Strauss Kahn's arrest on charges of sexual assault and attempted rape, following which he formally announced his candidacy on 7 June 2011. Support Fmr. Ministers: MP's, mayors and presidents of regional or general councils: Patrick Mennucci; Others politicians: Michèle Sabban. Non-political personalities:

== Campaign ==
=== First round ===
The six candidates participated in three televised debates on 15 September, 28 September and 5 October 2011.

In the first round election day, around 2,700,000 voters cast their ballots: Hollande won 39 percent of the vote, followed by Aubry with 30 percent and Montebourg at 17 percent. Former presidential candidate Royal came in fourth place with 7 percent of the vote.

=== Second round ===
On 9 October 2011, after the first results of the first round, Manuel Valls called his voters to cast their ballots in favor of François Hollande; on 10 and 12 October 2011, Jean-Michel Baylet and Ségolène Royal respectively announced they would support François Hollande. On 14 October 2011, Arnaud Montebourg did not instruct his voters how to vote, although he explained he would personally cast his ballot for Hollande.

François Hollande and Martine Aubry contested a runoff election on 16 October 2011, after a televised debate held on 12 October 2011. Almost 2,900,000 voters participated to the second round: François Hollande won the primary with around 57 percent of the vote, becoming the official candidate of the Socialist Party and its allies for the 2012 presidential election.

== Results ==
Summary of the 8–9 and 15–16 October 2011 French Socialist Party presidential primary
Candidates	Parties		1st round		2nd round	
Candidates	Parties		Votes	%	Votes	%
François Hollande	Socialist Party	PS	1,038,207	39.17%	1,607,268	56.57%
Martine Aubry	Socialist Party	PS	806,189	30.42%	1,233,899	43.43%
Arnaud Montebourg	Socialist Party	PS	455,609	17.19%		
Ségolène Royal	Socialist Party	PS	184,096	6.95%		
Manuel Valls	Socialist Party	PS	149,103	5.63%		
Jean-Michel Baylet	Radical Party of the Left	PRG	17,055	0.64%		
Total			2,650,259	100%	2,860,157	100%
Valid votes			2,650,259	99.59%	2,860,157	99.34%
Spoilt and null votes			11,025	0.41%	18,990	0.66%
Total			2,661,284	100%	2,879,147	100%
Table of results ordered by number of votes received in first round, complete results on resultats.lesprimairescitoyennes.fr Archived 7 April 2012 at the Wayback Machine.

== See also ==
- 2012 French presidential election
