= South-West France (European Parliament constituency) =

Former European Parliament constituency

- European Parliament constituency
- Location among the 2014 constituencies

- Shown within France
- Member state: France
- Created: 2004
- MEPs: 10

South-West France was a former European Parliament constituency. It consisted of the regions of Aquitaine (now part of region Nouvelle-Aquitaine) and Occitania. Ahead of the 2019 European Parliament election, it was abolished in favor of a single national vote.

== Members of the European Parliament ==
Election	MEP (party)	MEP (party)	MEP (party)	MEP (party)	MEP (party)	MEP (party)	MEP (party)	MEP (party)	MEP (party)	MEP (party)
2004	Kader Arif (PS)	Françoise Castex (PS)	Béatrice Patrie (PS)	Michel Teychenné (PS)	Jean-Marie Cavada (UDF/ MoDem)	Anne Laperrouze (UDF/ MoDem)	Alain Lamassoure (UMP)	Christine de Veyrac (UMP)	Jean-Claude Martinez (FN)	9 seats
2007	Kader Arif (PS)	Françoise Castex (PS)	Béatrice Patrie (PS)	Michel Teychenné (PS)	Jean-Marie Cavada (UDF/ MoDem)	Anne Laperrouze (UDF/ MoDem)	Alain Lamassoure (UMP)	Christine de Veyrac (UMP)	Jean-Claude Martinez (FN)	9 seats
2009	Kader Arif (PS)	Françoise Castex (PS)	Jean-Luc Mélenchon (FG)	José Bové (EELV)	Catherine Grèze (EELV)	Robert Rochefort; MoDem)	Alain Lamassoure (UMP)	Christine de Veyrac (UMP)	Franck Proust (UMP /LR)	Marie-Thérèse Sanchez-Schmidt (UMP)
2014	Eric Andrieu (PS)	Virgine Roziére (PRG)	Jean-Luc Mélenchon (FG)	José Bové (EELV)	Louis Aliot (FN)	Robert Rochefort; MoDem)	Joélle Mállin (FN)	Michellé Alliot-Marie (UMP /LR)	Franck Proust (UMP /LR)	Edouard Ferrand (FN)
2015	Eric Andrieu (PS)	Virgine Roziére (PRG)	Jean-Luc Mélenchon (FG)	José Bové (EELV)	Louis Aliot (FN)	Robert Rochefort; MoDem)	Joélle Mállin (FN)	Michellé Alliot-Marie (UMP /LR)	Franck Proust (UMP /LR)	Edouard Ferrand (FN)
2017	Eric Andrieu (PS)	Virgine Roziére (PRG)	Marie-Pierre Vieu (PCF)	José Bové (EELV)	France Jamet (FN)	Robert Rochefort; MoDem)	Joélle Mállin (FN)	Michellé Alliot-Marie (UMP /LR)	Franck Proust (UMP /LR)	Edouard Ferrand (FN)

== Results ==
=== 2009 ===
European Election 2009: South-West
List	Candidates	Votes	Of total (%)	± from prev.
UMP	Dominique Baudis Christine de Veyrac Alain Lamassoure Marie-Thérèse Sanchez-Schmidt	705,900	25.89	
PS	Kader Arif Françoise Castex	465,076	17.72	
EELV	José Bové Catherine Grèze	415,457	15.83	
MoDem	Robert Rochefort	225,917	8.61	
FG	Jean-Luc Mélenchon	214,079	8.16	
FN	None	155,806	5.94	
NPA	None	147,422	5.62	
AEI	None	111,313	4.24	
Libertas	None	80,274	3.06	
DLR	None	33,656	1.28	
LO	None	26,760	1.02	
Far right	None	24,070	0.92	
AB	None	5,771	0.22	
EAJ/PNV	None	4,201	0.16	
Europe Démocratie Espéranto	None	3,975	0.13	
Liberal Alternative	None	3,434	0.13	
Europe décroissance	None	827	0.03	
Union des gens	None	232	0.01	
Newropeans	None	371	0.01	
Far right	None	266	0.01	
La force de la non-violence	None	102	0.00	
Permis de voter – RIC – France	None	93	0.00	
Communists	None	57	0.00	
Pour une Europe utile	None	16	0.00	
Turnout		2,759,549	44.50	

=== 2004 ===
Brackets indicate the number of votes per seat won.

European Election 2004: South-West
List	Candidates	Votes	Of total (%)	± from prev.
PS	Kader Arif Françoise Castex Robert Navarro Béatrice Patrie	777,678 (194,419.5)	30.85	
UMP	Alain Lamassoure Christine de Veyrac	382,719 (191,359.5)	15.18	
UDF	Jean-Marie Cavada Anne Laperrouze	333,828 (166,914)	13.24	
FN	Jean-Claude Martinez	220,764	8.76	
LV	Gérard Onesta	209,621	8.31	
PCF	None	162,854	6.46	
MPF	None	116,173	4.61	
CPNT	None	86,588	3.43	
Far left	None	65,073	2.58	
RPF	None	51,834	2.06	
La France d'en bas	None	42,011	1.67	
Workers' Party	None	20,761	0.82	
Rassemblement des Contribuables Français	None	20,550	0.82	
Les régionalistes : Occitanie, Catalogne, Euskadi	None	9,249	0.37	
MNR	None	8,131	0.32	
AB	None	5,157	0.20	
Vivre mieux avec l'Europe	None	3,666	0.15	
Eŭropo Demokratio Esperanto	None	3,611	0.14	
Diversité pour l'Europe	None	395	0.02	
Jus Cogens	None	160	0.01	
Parti Fédéraliste	None	83	0.00	
AR	None	82	0.00	
Parti des Socioprofessionnels	None	69	0.00	
Parti Humaniste	None	58	0.00	
Pôle des Libertés	None	9	0.00	
France Unie	None	8	0.00	
Turnout		2,521,132	45.60	
