= List of senators of Seine-Saint-Denis =

Location of Seine-Saint-Denis in France

Departments created from the former Seine and Seine-et-Oise departments

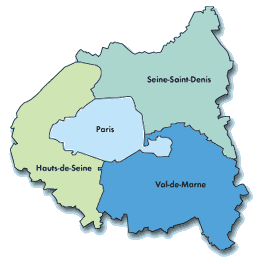
Paris and surrounding departments. Seine-Saint-Denis in northeast

Following is a list of senators of Seine-Saint-Denis, people who have represented the department of Seine-Saint-Denis in the Senate of France. The department was created from the former Seine and Seine-et-Oise departments in 1968.

Senators for Seine-Saint-Denis under the French Fifth Republic:

Term	Name	Group	Notes
1968-1977	Charles Cathala	none	
1968-1977	Maurice Coutrot	Groupe socialiste	
1968-1977	Marie-Thérèse Goutmann	Groupe Communiste	
1968-1977	Fernand Lefort	Groupe Communiste	
1968-1977	Jacques Duclos	Groupe Communiste	Died in office 25 April 1975
1968-1977	James Marson	Groupe Communiste	From 26 April 1975 in place of Jacques Duclos
1977-1986	Marie-Thérèse Goutmann	Groupe Communiste	Resigned 23 July 1978 (elected deputy)
1977-1986	Danielle Bidard-Reydet	Groupe communiste républicain citoyen et écologiste	From 24 July 1978 in place of Marie-Thérèse Goutmann
1977-1986	Marcel Debarge	Groupe socialiste	
1977-1986	Claude Fuzier	Groupe socialiste	
1977-1986	Jean Garcia	Groupe Communiste	
1977-1986	Fernand Lefort	Groupe Communiste	
1977-1986	James Marson	Groupe Communiste	
1986-1995	Danielle Bidard-Reydet	Groupe communiste républicain citoyen et écologiste	
1986-1995	Robert Calméjane	Groupe du Rassemblement pour la République	
1986-1995	Ernest Cartigny	Groupe du Rassemblement Démocratique et Social Européen	
1986-1995	Marcel Debarge	Groupe socialiste	Resigned 16 May 1991 (named to cabinet)
1986-1995	Claude Fuzier	Groupe socialiste	From 18 June 1991 in place of Marcel Debarge
1986-1995	Paulette Fost	Groupe Communiste	
1986-1995	Jean Garcia	Groupe Communiste	
1995-2004	Danielle Bidard-Reydet	Groupe communiste républicain citoyen et écologiste	
1995-2004	Robert Calméjane	Groupe du Rassemblement pour la République	Died in office 10 December 2002
1995-2004	Ernest Cartigny	Groupe du Rassemblement Démocratique et Social Européen	From 11 December 2002 in place of Robert Calméjane
1995-2004	Marcel Debarge	Groupe socialiste	
1995-2004	Christian Demuynck	Groupe Union pour un Mouvement Populaire	
1995-2004	Jacques Mahéas	Groupe socialiste	
1995-2004	Jack Ralite	Groupe Communiste, Républicain, Citoyen et des Sénateurs du Parti de Gauche	
2004-2011	Éliane Assassi	Groupe communiste républicain citoyen et écologiste	
2004-2011	Philippe Dallier	Groupe Les Républicains	
2004-2011	Christian Demuynck	Groupe Union pour un Mouvement Populaire	
2004-2011	Jacques Mahéas	Groupe socialiste	
2004-2011	Jack Ralite	Groupe Communiste, Républicain, Citoyen et des Sénateurs du Parti de Gauche	
2004-2011	Dominique Voynet	Groupe socialiste	
2011-2017	Aline Archimbaud	none	
2011-2017	Éliane Assassi	Groupe communiste républicain citoyen et écologiste	
2011-2017	Vincent Capo-Canellas	Groupe Union Centriste	
2011-2017	Philippe Dallier	Groupe Les Républicains	
2011-2017	Gilbert Roger	Groupe socialiste et républicain	
2011-2017	Claude Dilain	Groupe socialiste et apparentés	Died in office 3 March 2015
2011-2017	Évelyne Yonnet	Groupe socialiste et républicain	From 4 March 2015 in place of Claude Dilain
2017-2023	Éliane Assassi	Groupe communiste républicain citoyen et écologiste	
2017-2023	Vincent Capo-Canellas	Groupe Union Centriste	
2017-2023	Philippe Dallier	Groupe Les Républicains	
2017-2023	Annie Delmont-Koropoulis	Groupe Les Républicains	
2017-2023	Fabien Gay	Groupe communiste républicain citoyen et écologiste	
2017-2023	Gilbert Roger	Groupe socialiste et républicain	

== Sources ==
- Liste des anciens sénateurs de la Vème République par circonscription (in French), Sénat de France
- Liste par département – Seine-Saint-Denis (in French), Sénat de France
