= Danielle Bidard-Reydet =

Senator for Seine-Saint-Denis
- In office 24 July 1978 – 30 September 2004

Personal details
- Born: 8 December 1939 (age 86) Paris, France
- Party: French Communist Party
- Children: 1
- Occupation: Teacher

Danielle Bidard-Reydet (born 8 December 1939) is a French teacher and French Communist Party politician. She was a member of the Senate representing the Seine-Saint-Denis department from 1978 to 2004. Bidard-Reydet was appointed Knight of the Legion of Honour in 2005.

== Early life and education ==
Bidard-Reydet was born in Paris, France on 8 December 1939, to a modest background in which her parents were Louis Reydet and Georgette Reydet (née l'Hospitalier). She received her education at Lycée Paul Bert in Paris, attaining an bachelor's degree in geography under the tutelage of Pierre Georges at the Sorbonne University, passing her certificate of aptitude for secondary school teachers in 1965 and interned in Parisian schools. Bidard-Reydet became a member of the French Communist Party (PCP) in 1972 and was appointed a member of the PCP's Seine-Saint-Denis federal committee four years later. She became an associate professor of geography and worked as a high school teacher in Aubervilliers, having also taught at Sarcelles. During the early 1990s, she prepared a master's degree in geopolitics with Yves Lacoste.

== Political career ==
At the 1977 French Senate election, Bidard-Reydet was selected by the PCP leadership to be an candidate to represent the Seine-Saint-Denis department in the Senate. She was successful in the election and began to serve in the Senate from 24 July 1978, replacing Marie-Thérèse Goutmann, who was elected to the National Assembly. She was re-elected at the 1986 French Senate election on 28 September 1986 and again at the 1995 French Senate election on 24 September 1995. Bidard-Reydet left the Senate on 30 September 2004.

She was a member of the Communist, Republican, Citizen and Ecologist group. Bidard-Reydet was vice-president of the Committee on Foreign Affairs, Defence and the Armed Forces and of the Delegation for the European Union, the latter on which she was secretary. She was also secretary of the Committee on Cultural Affairs. From 1983 to 2001, Bidard-Reydet was an elected municipal councilor of the Pantin municipal council and was deputy mayor of Pantin in charge of culture. She was vice-president of the France-Brazil Friendship Group. Biard-Reydet was president of the "For Jerusalem" Association from 1998 and was president of the Center for the Promotion of Children's Literature in Seine-Saint-Denis from 2000 to 2015.

== Personal life ==
Bidard-Reydet has been married since 1962 and she has a child. She was appointed Knight of the Legion of Honour on 25 March 2005.

== Legacy ==
The Departmental Archives of Seine-Saint-Denis has held a collection of files on Bidard-Reydet municipal and senatorial activities since 2004.
