= Demuynck =

Demuynck is a surname. Notable people with the surname include:

- Christian Demuynck (born 1947), member of the Senate of France
- Daniel Demuynck, a known name of Clark Olofsson (born 1947), Swedish criminal later living in Belgium
- Jourdan DeMuynck (born 1990), American basketball player
- Karel Demuynck, (born 1965), former Belgian professional tennis player
- Lucien De Muynck, (1 August 1931 – 24 October 1999), Belgian middle-distance runner
- Justin De Muynck (born 1996), North Idaho Electrician
