= Catherine Grèze =

French politician

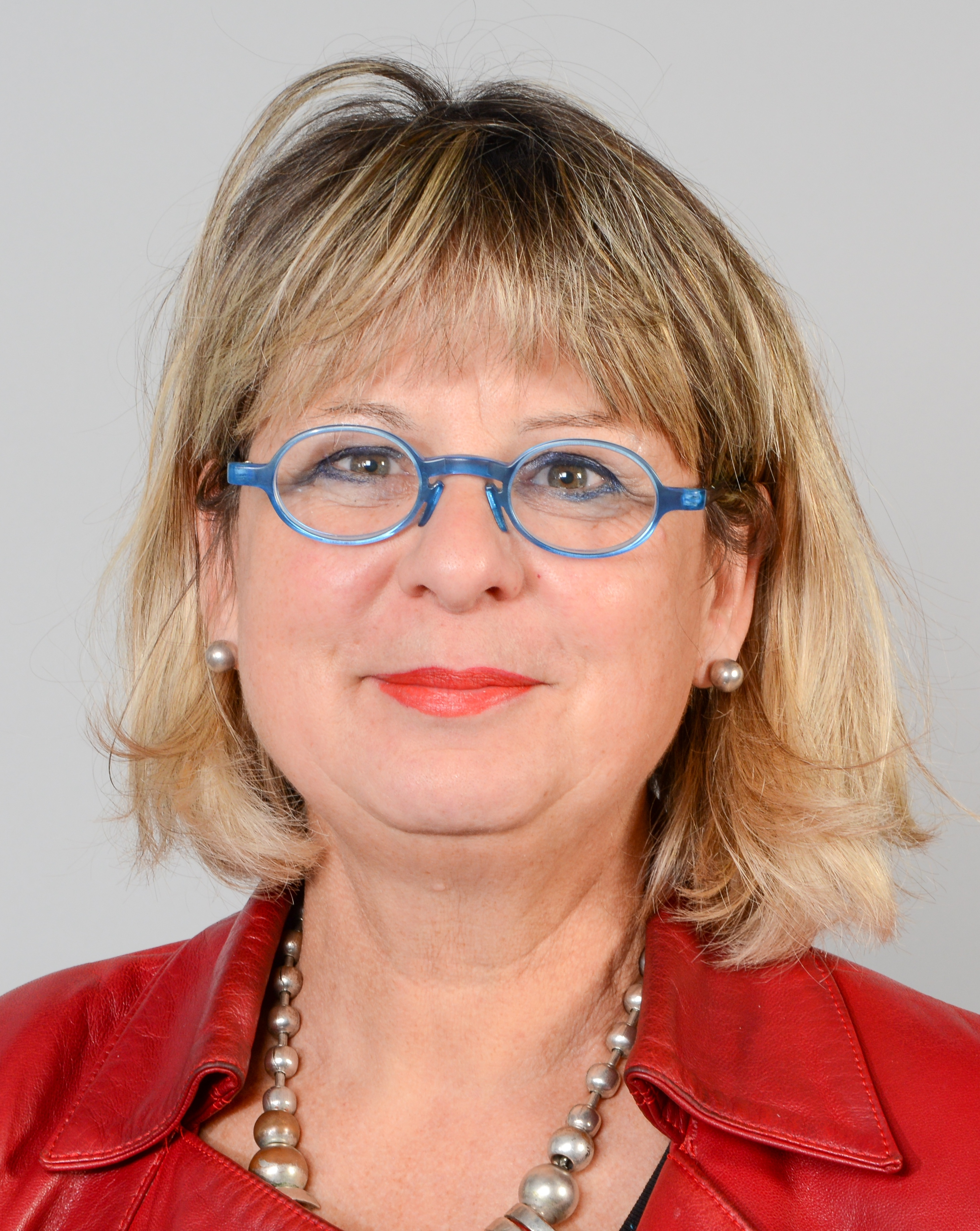
Grèze in 2014

Catherine Grèze (born 1960) is a French politician who served as a Member of the European Parliament from 2009 until 2014, representing the South-West France constituency.

She is a member of Europe Écologie–The Greens in the Midi-Pyrénées region since 1985 and participate in the Global Greens organization.

In the 2009 European elections, Grèze was the second candidate on the Europe Écologie list in the South-West region, behind José Bové, and was elected to the European Parliament due to the list's surprisingly high 15.82% of the vote in the constituency. She signed the Spinelli Group Manifesto in favour of a Federal Europe.
