= Marie-Thérèse Sanchez-Schmid =

French politician

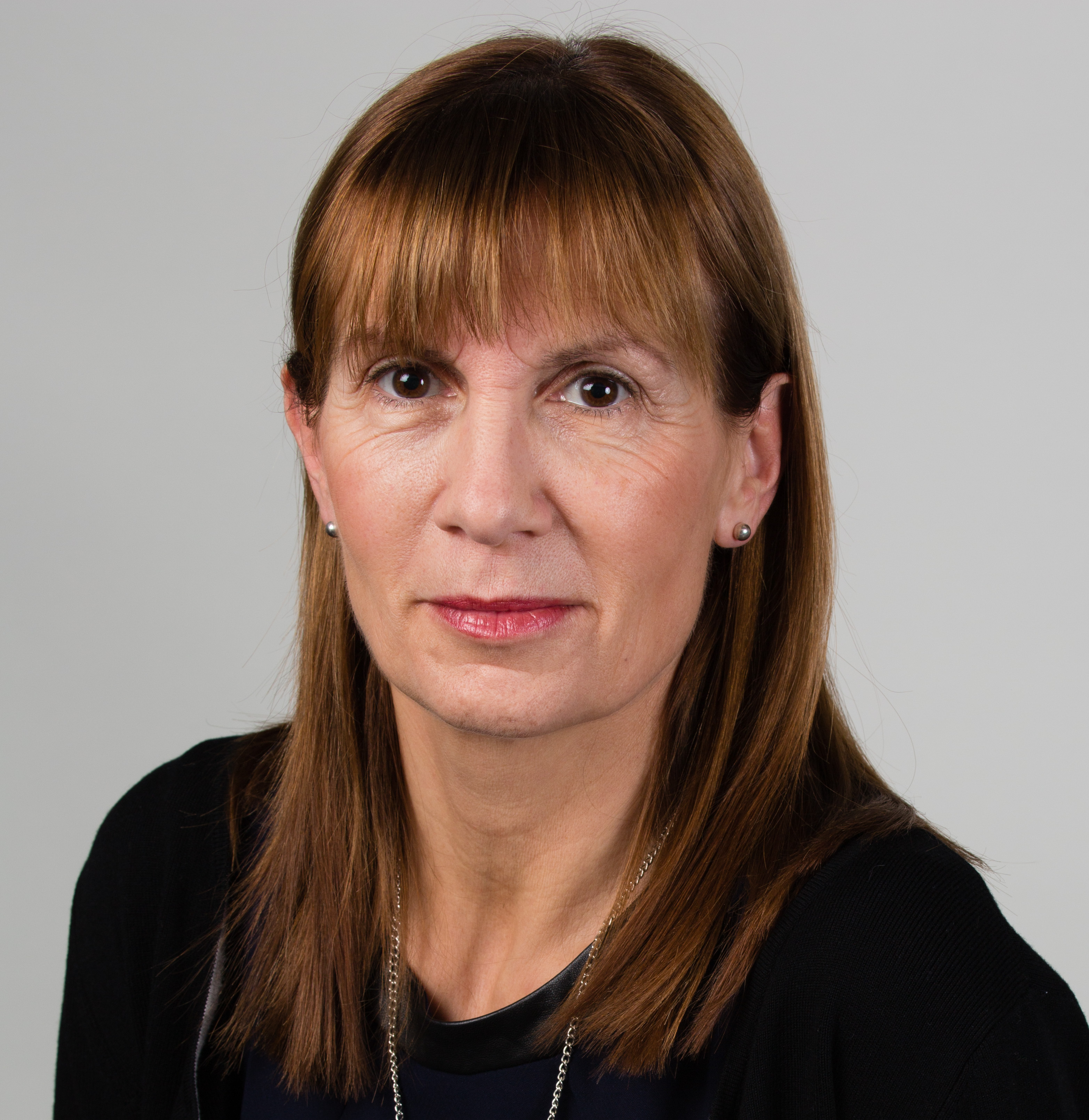

Member of the European Parliament for South-West France
- In office 2009–2014

Personal details
- Born: September 11, 1957 (age 68)
- Party: Radical Party

Marie-Thérèse Sanchez-Schmid (born 15 November 1957) is a French politician who served as a Member of the European Parliament from 2009 until 2014, representing the South-West France constituency. She is a member of the Radical Party.

She is an assistant to the Mayor of Perpignan, Jean-Paul Alduy and an English teacher. In the 2009 European elections, she was the fourth candidate on the Union for a Popular Movement list in the South-West region, and was elected to the European Parliament.
