= Jean-Pierre Audy =

French politician (born 1952)

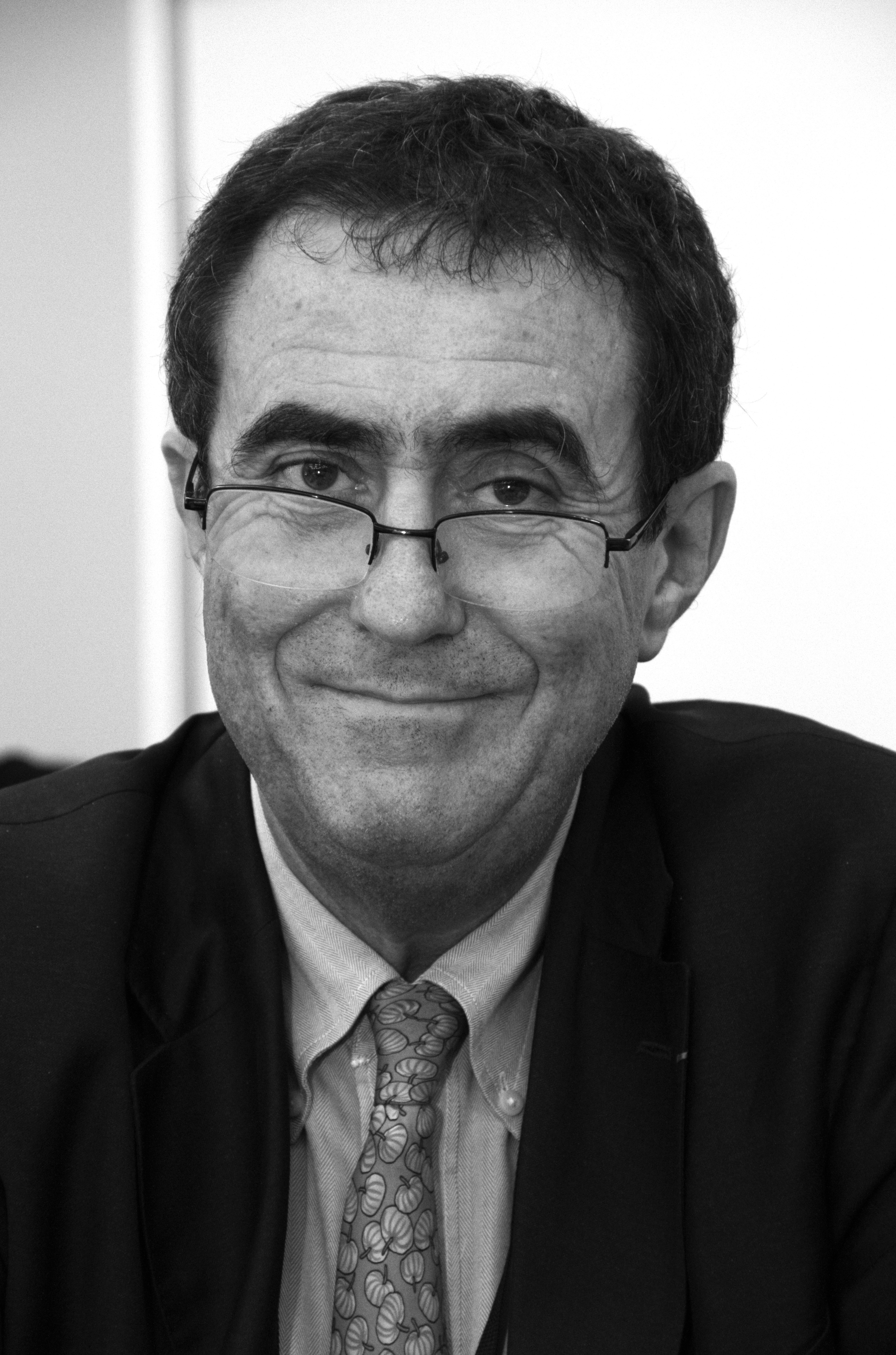
Jean-Pierre Audy in 2014.

Jean-Pierre Audy (born 12 June 1952 in Tulle, Corrèze) is a French politician and a Member of the European Parliament for France. He is a member of the Union for a Popular Movement (UMP), which is part of the European People's Party. He is a member of the Committee on International Trade and the Delegation for relations with the Maghreb countries and the Arab Maghreb Union (including Libya).

He is a substitute on the Committee on Industry, Research and Energy, on the Delegation for relations with the countries of Southeast Asia and the Association of Southeast Asian Nations. In February 2010, he was elected head of the French delegation of the EPP group in the European Parliament.

== Education ==
He holds a degree in chartered accountancy, a post-graduate diploma in taxation, finance, and business law, which he earned in Clermont-Ferrand. He studied at the Clermont-Ferrand Business School and obtained a master's degree in economics. He received a post-graduate diploma from the Institute of Business Management in Clermont-Ferrand and is a graduate of the International Student Center of the University of California, Los Angeles.

== Career ==
He founded a firm of auditors in 1995 and a chartered accountancy practice in 1979.

Since 2002 he has been a member of the UMP departmental committee. He has been a member of the Meymac municipal council since 1977, and from 1977 until 1995 he was the deputy mayor. Since 2008 he has been a member of the Correze General Council.

From 1977 to 2000 he was the technical advisor to the International Auditing Practices Committee of the International Federation of Accountants, and from June 2004 to June 2006 he was France's representative to the Small and Medium Practices Permanent Task Force. From 1985 to 1996 he was a member of the Limoges Order of Accountants' regional council (vice-president from 1988 to 1990 then president from 1991 to 1993), and from 1994 to 2001 he was vice-chairman of the French Order of Accountants. He was chairman of the Tulle and Ussel Chamber of Commerce and Industry from 1998 until June 2005, chairman of the Limousin Poitou-Charentes Regional Chamber of Commerce and Industry from 2001 to 2003, and Vice-President of the Assembly of French Chambers of Commerce and Industry from 2001 to 2004.

== Honors ==
He is a Knight of the Legion of Honor and a Knight of the Ordre des Palmes académiques.
