= Robert Rochefort =

French economist and politician (born 1955)

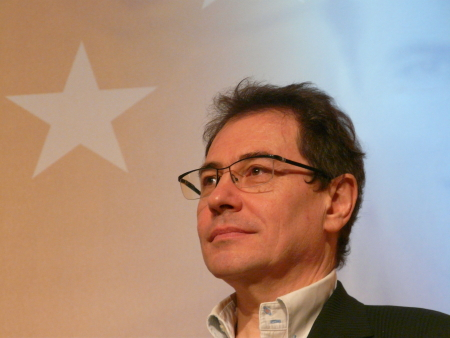
- Robert Rochefort in 2009

Member of the European Parliament
- In office 2009–2019
- Constituency: South-West France

Personal details
- Born: 19 September 1955 (age 71) Paris, France
- Party: Modem
- Education: ENSAE ParisTech

Robert Rochefort (born 19 September 1955 in Paris) is a French economist and politician.

== Political career ==
In 2009, Rochefort joined the MoDem, and was selected to lead the MoDem list in the South-West constituency ahead of the 2009 European elections. He was the MoDem's only elected Member of the European Parliament in that region. He has since been serving on the Committee on the Internal Market and Consumer Protection; following the 2014 elections, he became one of the committee's vice-chairmen under the leadership of Vicky Ford until January 2017. In addition to his committee assignments, he has been a member of the parliament's delegation for relations with Iraq.

In August 2016, Rochefort was arrested by police after being caught masturbating in a DIY store in Vélizy-Villacoublay (Yvelines), near Paris. By September, MoDem chair François Bayrou urged Rochefort to relinquish all his party duties following his arrest.
