= Franck Proust =

French politician (born 1963)

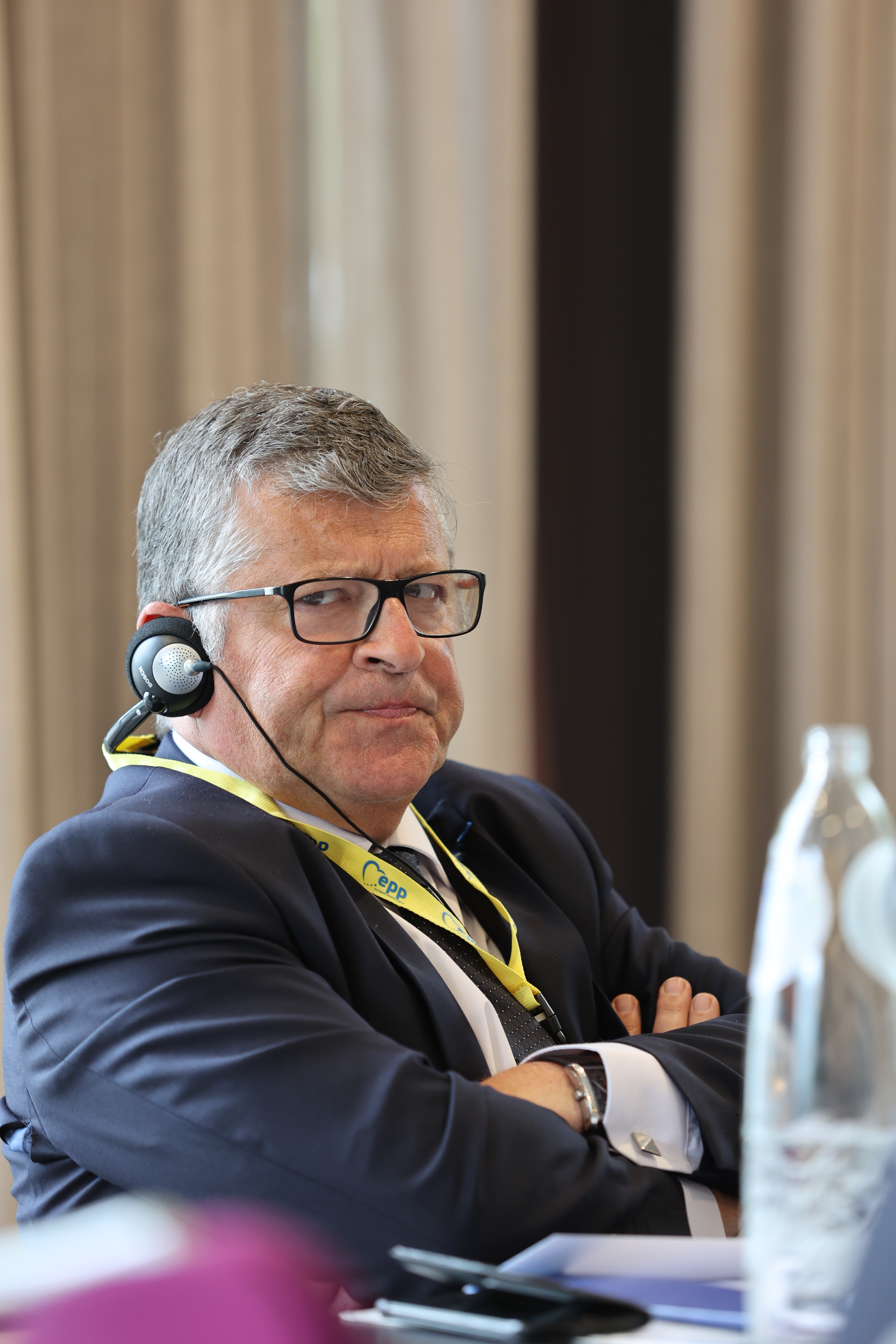

Member of the European Parliament as first Vice-Chair of the EPP Group
- In office 2011–2019
- Preceded by: Dominique Baudis

Personal details
- Born: 2 May 1963 (age 63) Poitiers, France
- Occupation: Politician of the Union for a Popular Movement

Franck Proust (born 2 May 1963) is a French politician of the Union for a Popular Movement who served as a Member of the European Parliament from 2011 until 2019, first vice-chair of the French EPP Group delegation in the European Parliament. He is first deputy mayor of Nîmes. Being originally an entrepreneur, he is also an insurance agent in Nîmes.

== Professional background ==
Proust holds a postgraduate degree in market and management sciences from the centre of studies and research of Clermont-Ferrand and works as an insurance agent.

== European Parliament ==
=== 2011-2014 ===
On 23 June 2011, Proust started serving as a Member of the European Parliament. His predecessor, Dominique Baudis, was to become ombudsman (Défenseur des droits) towards the French Republic. He sits in the EPP Group, the Committee on International Trade and the Committee on Industry, Research and Energy.

During this mandate, he asserted the fact that there could be no competitiveness for European businesses as long as external trade relations are not balanced. He argued for a better implementation of the principle of reciprocity and greater common sense from the European Institutions.

He was rapporteur on Monitoring EU/third country trade in drug precursors, such as regulations concerning rules for the monitoring of trade between the Community and third countries in drug precursors as well as with the Federation of Russia

He was also rapporteur on CARS 2020: towards a strong, competitive and sustainable European car industry (European Commission's action plan), he strongly argued in favour of greater competitiveness in the automotive industry.

On 2013 and 2014, he initiated MEPs action against the revision of the ruling of State aid for regional airports.

He also appealed the French Government to put in the transport national priorities the High-Speed Railways piece going from Montpellier to Perpignan, missing part of the European High-Speed Corridor going from Amsterdam to Sevilla.

=== 2014-2019 ===
On a common program with Michèle Alliot-Marie, Proust was re-elected member of the European Parliament on 25 May 2014 or the French South-West France (European Parliament constituency). He sits in the Committee on International Trade and in the Committee on Transport and Tourism.

He also served as vice-chair of the Sky and Space intergroup and first vice-chair of the French EPP delegation in the European Parliament.

He was the rapporteur for the Commission proposal on the establishment of a framework for the screening of foreign direct investments in EU Member States.

The 28th of July 2017, Proust is accused of influence traffic and attempted influence traffic and favoritism. This accusation follows suspicious calls for public tenders made in 2006 by the Nîmes Métropole mixed economy company when Proust was its president. At the end of a press conference at the beginning of August, he indicated that he would not resign from his mandates.

== Nîmes city council ==
=== 1989-1995 : First local mandate in Nîmes, in the majority ===
1989: aged 25, Proust became member of Nîmes' city council in charge of tourism, with Jean Bousquet as a mayor. 1991: Proust is appointed deputy mayor and president of Nîmes' office tourism. Being already a touristic town, Proust initiated summer's festivities every Thursday in Nîmes (Les jeudi de Nîmes), which increased cities' input and its touristic attractivity.

=== 1995 - 2001: Within the political opposition of Nîmes' city council ===
From 1995 to 2001, Proust is into the political opposition of Nîmes' city council. He joined "Démocratie libérale" party in 1997 and he is appointed delegate of the federal secretary in the Gard.

=== 2001 - Nowadays : Deputy Mayor of Nîmes ===
2001: Proust runs for Nîmes' City Council within the alliance of right wing parties. March 2001: Jean-Paul Fournier is elected mayor of Nîmes and appoints Proust deputy mayor in charge of economic development and foreign relations. He is also entrusted with the portfolio of vice-president to the Community of Agglomeration of Nîmes. From 2001 to 2006 : Proust is in charge of the UMP party majority within the City Council. March 2008: Following a common program for the City Council elections with Jean-Paul Fournier, he is appointed first deputy mayor.

== Former local mandate ==
- Councillor to the Gard from 2004 to 2011

== National political commitments ==
- Support to Nicolas Sarkozy for the presidency of the UMP party in 2014.
- Support to Jean-François Copé for the presidency of the UMP party in 2012.
- National secretary of the UMP party (2012-2014)

== SENIM scandal ==
While he was president of the SENIM (mixed entreprise of Nîmes Métropole from 2001 to 2008, Franck Proust was accused of having favored the sale of land to a developer (Jean-Luc Colonna d'Istria). In exchange, the latter have provided him with premises for his 2007 legislative campaign. He was also accused of favoritism in awarding works contracts in the area of the triangle of the train station. He was indicted in 2017 for influence peddling and receiving influence peddling. On Thursday, April 14, 2021, Franck Proust was sentenced by the Court of Appeal of Nîmes to 12 months suspended prison, 15,000 euros fine and five years of ineligibility.
