= Philippe Dallier =

French politician

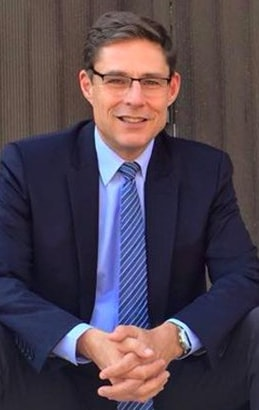

Departmental councillor of Seine-Saint-Denis
- Incumbent
- Assumed office 1 July 2021
- President: Stéphane Troussel
- Preceded by: Stephen Hervé

Member of the French Senate for Seine-Saint-Denis
- In office 1 October 2004 – 27 July 2021
- Succeeded by: Thierry Meignen

Mayor of Les Pavillons-sous-Bois
- In office 1995–2017
- Preceded by: Bernard Portel
- Succeeded by: Katia Coppi

Personal details
- Born: 8 December 1962 (age 63) Levallois-Perret, France
- Party: The Republicans

Philippe Dallier (born 8 December 1962) is a French politician, and a member of the Senate of France. He represents Seine-Saint-Denis, in the Île-de-France region, and is a member of The Republicans party.

== Biography ==
With a technical degree in computer science and a postgraduate degree from the Conservatoire national des arts et métiers, he began his career as a project manager in this field at Société Générale.

He joined the Rally for the Republic in 1981 and was elected as an opposition councilor in Bondy in 1983. He was re-elected as an opposition councilor in 1989.

On June 18, 1995, in the second round of a three-way race, he defeated the socialist mayor of Les Pavillons-sous-Bois by 144 votes and, at the age of 32, became mayor of the town.

In 1997, he was the deputy for Jean-Claude Abrioux, who was re-elected as representative for the 10th district of Seine-Saint-Denis against Harlem Désir. He was again his deputy in 2002.

In March 1998, he was elected general councilor for the canton of Pavillons-sous-Bois. He was re-elected on March 21, 2004, but resigned from this position shortly after his election as senator. He was succeeded by his first deputy, Katia Coppi.

In March 2001, he was re-elected mayor of Pavillons-sous-Bois in the first round with 74.69% of the vote.

He was elected List of senators of Seine-Saint-Denis on September 26, 2004.

Philippe Dallier ran as an independent candidate in the 10th district of Seine-Saint-Denis in the 2007 legislative elections, receiving the support of outgoing representative Jean-Claude Abrioux. He faced off against the UMP's official candidate, Gérard Gaudron, mayor of Aulnay-sous-Bois. Philippe Dallier withdrew after the results of the first round.

In the 2008 municipal elections, the list he led in Pavillons-sous-Bois won in the first round with 69.77% of the vote and he was re-elected mayor.

The same was true in the 2014 municipal elections in Seine-Saint-Denis, where the list he headed under the UMP banner won 82.82% of the vote in the first round, making him the most popular mayor in France, ahead of PS candidate Bernard Deny (17.17%).

== Bibliography ==
- Page on the Senate website
