= 1995 French Socialist Party presidential primary =

Socialist Party presidential primary, 1995
5 February 1995	2006 →
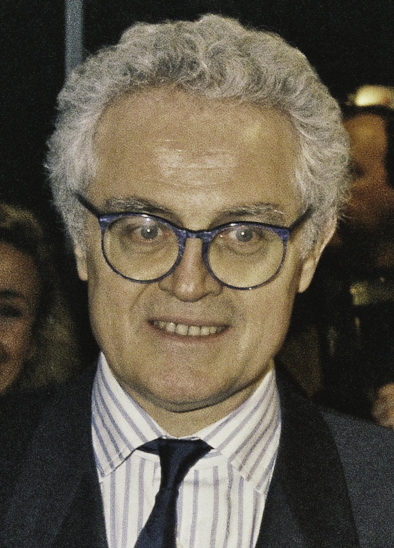

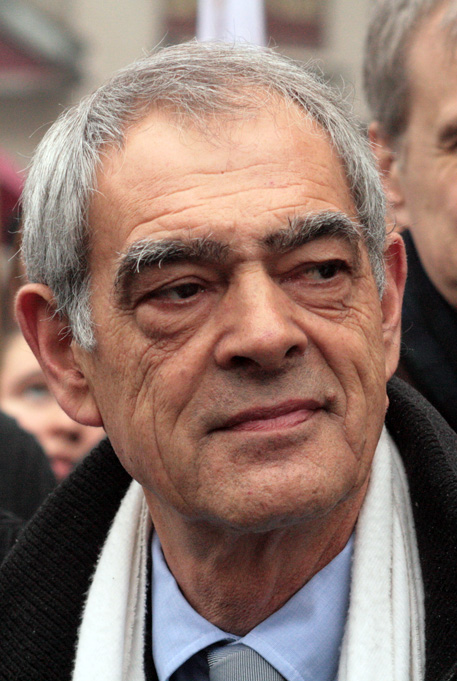
Nominee	Lionel Jospin	Henri Emmanuelli
Party	PS	PS
Popular vote	52,250	27,095
Percentage	65.85%	34.15%
Previous Socialist nominee
François Mitterrand
Socialist nominee
Lionel Jospin

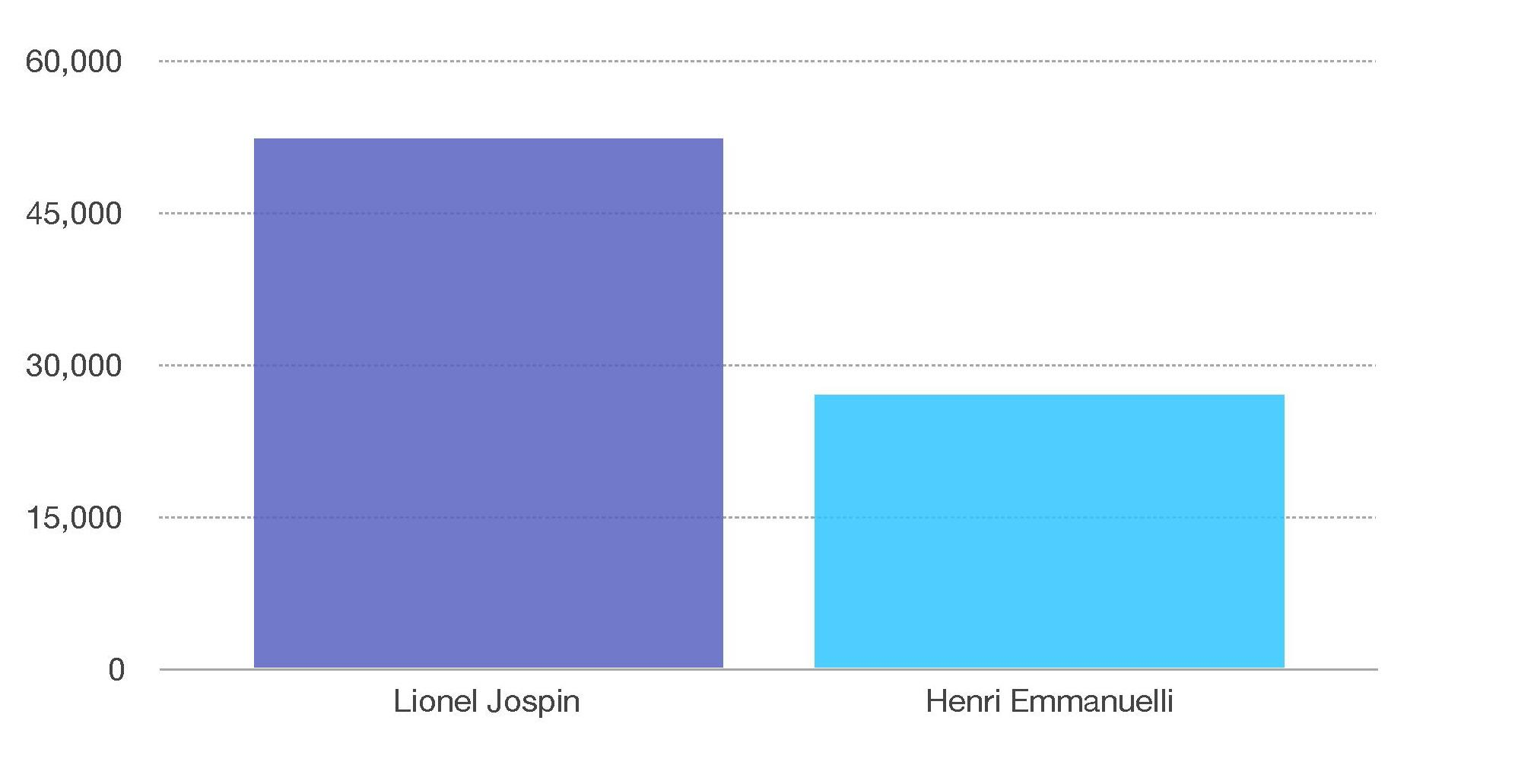
Results

The 1995 Socialist Party presidential primary was the selection process by which members of the Socialist Party of France chose their candidate for the 1995 French presidential election.

Lionel Jospin won the primary by a huge margin. He later lost the presidential election to conservative candidate Jacques Chirac on 7 May 1995, obtaining 47% of the vote in the runoff.

== See also ==
- 1995 French presidential election
