= Kader Arif =

French politician

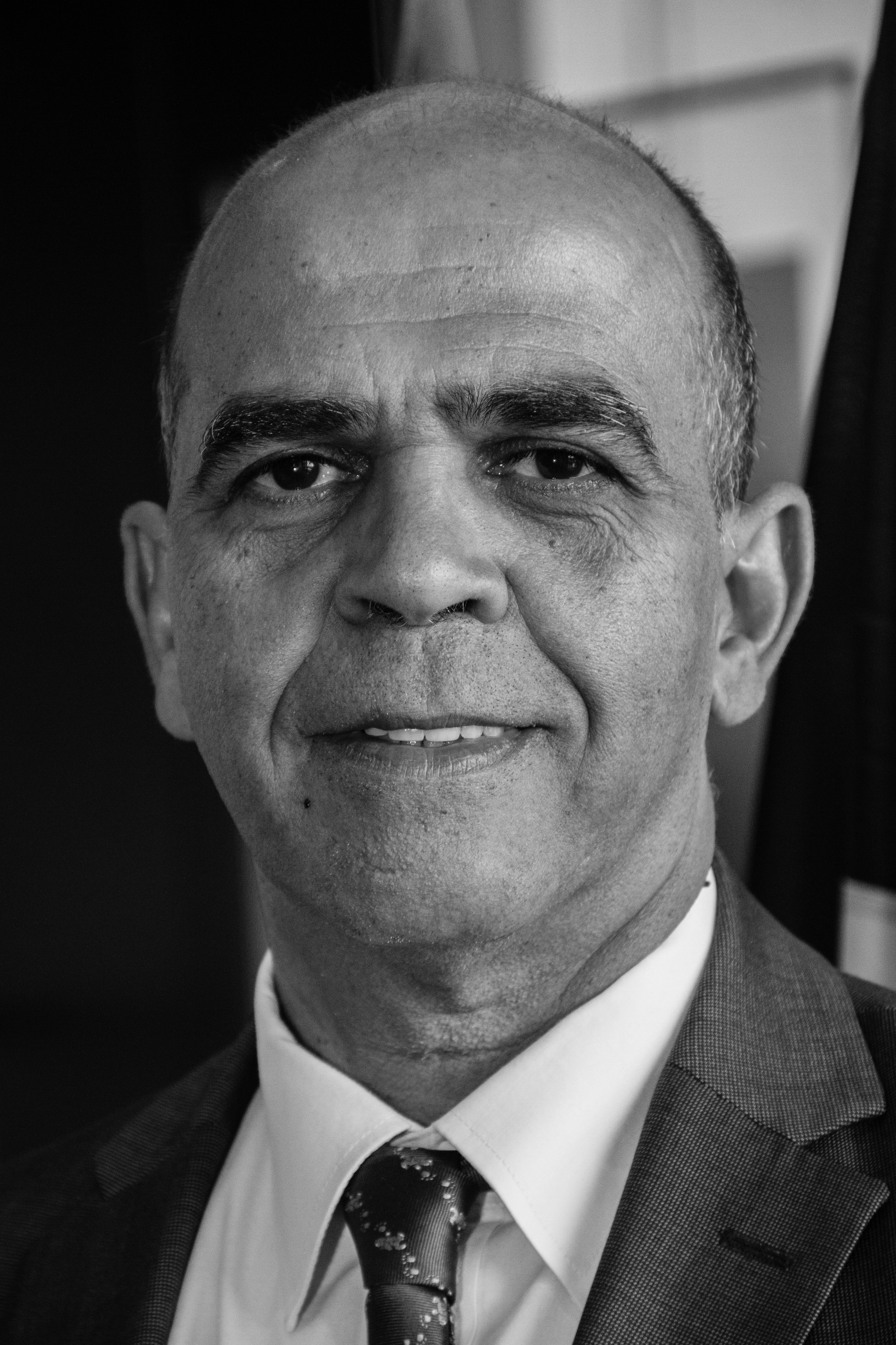

Secretary of State to the Minister of the Armed Forces
- In office 2012–2014
- President: François Hollande
- Prime Minister: Jean-Marc Ayrault; Manuel Valls
- Preceded by: Marc Laffineur
- Succeeded by: Jean-Marc Todeschini

Member of the European Parliament
- In office 2004–2012
- Constituency: South-East France

Personal details
- Born: 3 July 1959 (age 66) Algiers, Algeria
- Party: French; Socialist Party; EU; Party of European Socialists

Kader Arif (Arabic: قادر عريف; born 3 July 1959 in Algiers) is a French politician of the French Socialist Party (PS) who served as Junior Minister for Veterans to the French Minister of Defence Jean-Yves Le Drian from 2012 until 2014. Prior to this, he was a Member of the European Parliament for the south-west of France.

== Early career ==
- Master's degree in communications
- Special adviser to Lionel Jospin (1988–1992)
- Chargé d'affaires (1992–1995)
- Regional director of a tour operator (1995–1999)
- University manager (1999–2001)

He played as hooker for the French rugby union club Castres Olympique.

== Political career ==
=== Early beginnings ===
- First federal secretary, Haute-Garonne Socialist Party (1999–2008)
- Member of the Socialist Party national bureau (since 2000)
- Socialist Party national secretary, with responsibility for globalisation
- Member of Castanet-Tolosan Municipal Council, with responsibility for sport (1995–2001)

=== Member of the European Parliament, 2004–2012 ===
During his time as Member of the European Parliament, Arif served on the Committee on International Trade. He was also a substitute for the Committee on the Environment, Public Health and Food Safety, and a member of the delegations to the EU-Turkey Joint Parliamentary Committee, the ACP-EU Joint Parliamentary Assembly, and the Euro-Mediterranean Parliamentary Assembly.

In the Socialist Party's 2011 primaries, Arif endorsed François Hollande as the party's candidate for the 2012 presidential election.

In January 2012, Arif resigned as the European Parliament's rapporteur of the ACTA agreement in protest against the ACTA agreement.

=== Junior Minister for Veterans, 2012–2014 ===
On 16 May 2012, Arif was appointed Junior Minister for Veterans at the French Ministry of Defence in the government of Jean-Marc Ayrault by President François Hollande.

On 21 November 2014, Arif resigned due to suspicion on fraud and opening of judicial inquiry.

== Political positions ==
In the Socialist Party's 2017 primaries, Arif supported Vincent Peillon as the party's candidate for the presidential election later that year.

Ahead of the Socialist Party's 2018 convention in Aubervilliers, Arif publicly endorsed Olivier Faure as candidate for the party's leadership.

== See also ==
- European Parliament election, 2004
- Members of the European Parliament for France 2009–2014
