= Christine de Veyrac =

French politician (born 1959)

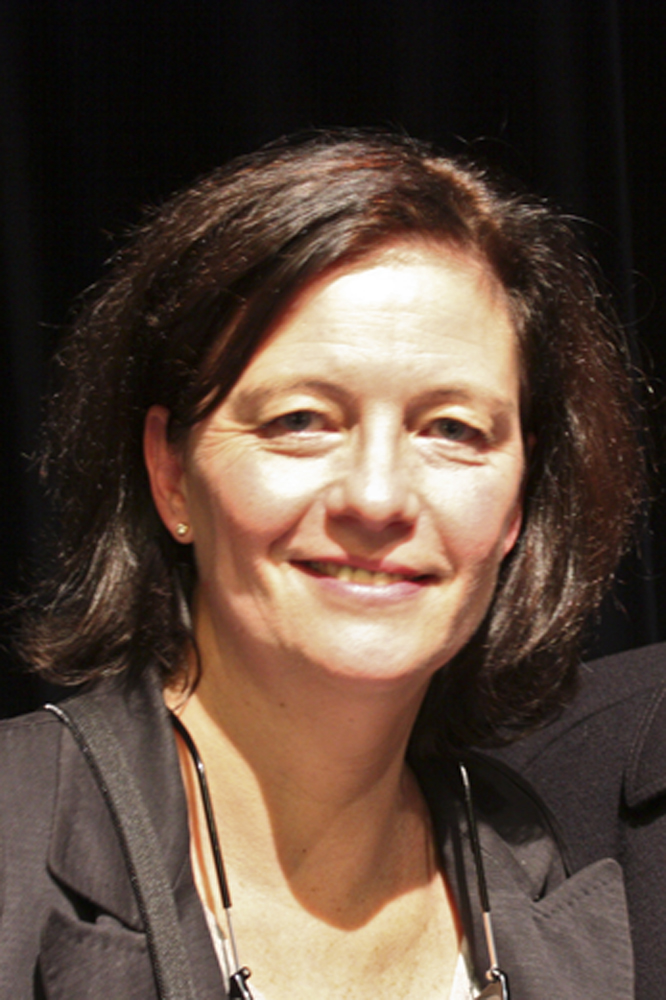
Christine de Veyrac

Christine de Veyrac (born 6 November 1959 in Toulouse) is a French politician who served as a Member of the European Parliament from 1999 until 2014. She is a member of the Union for a Popular Movement, which is part of the European People's Party.

In parliament, De Veyrac served on the Committee on Transport and Tourism. She was also a substitute for the Committee on Civil Liberties, Justice and Home Affairs, a member of the Delegation for relations with the Palestinian Legislative Council and a substitute for the Delegation for relations with Israel.

She used to be the parliamentary attaché of Valéry Giscard d'Estaing.

== Career ==
- Master's degree in international public law (Toulouse, 1983)
- National Secretary of the UMP (since 2003)
- Deputy Mayor of Toulouse with responsibility for international and European relations (since 2001)
- Member of the bureau of the Greater Toulouse Urban Area Community Council
- Secretary of the Town Planning and Aviation and Space Development Committee,
- Member of the European Parliament (from 1999)
