= James Marson =

French politician

Mayor of La Courneuve
- In office 1973–1996

Senator from Seine-Saint-Denis
- In office 1975–1986

Personal details
- Born: 1 November 1926 Villecresnes, France
- Died: 1 December 2017 (aged 91)
- Party: French Communist Party
- Occupation: Politician

James Marson (1 November 1926 – 1 December 2017) was a French politician.

He was born in Villecresnes. Marson began working at the age of 23 for what later became Alstom. He soon joined the French General Confederation of Labour. Shortly after leaving Alstom for Babcock & Wilcox, Marson became a member of the French Communist Party. Between 1964 and 1969, Marson ran several party academies in Seine-Saint-Denis. He served as mayor of La Courneuve from 1973 to 1996, and was Senator for Seine-Saint-Denis between 1975 and 1986. He died at the age of 91.
