= Maryvonne Blondin =

French politician (born 1947)

Member of the French Senate for Finistère
- In office 1 October 2008 – 30 September 2020

Personal details
- Born: 20 January 1947 (age 79) Quimper, France
- Party: Socialist Party
- Profession: Teacher

Maryvonne Blondin (born 20 January 1947) is a member of the Senate of France, representing the Finistère department. She is a member of the Socialist Party.

Blondin became Deputy mayor of Ergué-Gabéric in 1989. In 2001, she was elected General councillor of Finistère (Brittany) and will become as a consequence one of the vice-presidents of the Counsel General. She was elected Senator on 22 September 2008.

In addition to her work in the Senate, Blondin has been serving as member of the French delegation to the Parliamentary Assembly of the Council of Europe since 2008. In this capacity, she is part of the Socialist Group. She has in the past served as vice-chairwoman of the Committee on Equality and Non-Discrimination and as member of the Committee on the Honouring of Obligations and Commitments by Council of Europe Member States (Monitoring Committee); the Committee on Social Affairs, Health and Sustainable Development; the Sub-Committee on Children; and the Sub-Committee on Gender Equality. In her capacity as member of the Monitoring Committee, she has been the Assembly's rapporteur (alongside Egidijus Vareikis) for Moldova since 2019. She also serves as rapporteur on obstetrical and gynaecological violence.
