= Marie-Thérèse Goutmann =

French politician

- Parliamentary group: French Communist Party

Personal details
- Born: 29 August 1933 Pontchartrain (Seine-et-Oise)
- Died: 29 September 2016 (aged 83) Montpellier (Hérault)
- Parent: Jean Milhau

Marie-Thérèse Goutmann was a communist politician and the first woman to chair a Senate parliamentary group in France.

She was born in 1933 to the painter and resistance fighter Jean Milhau. She joined the French Communist Party at the age of 18, and after several unsuccessful election attempts became a senator for Seine-Saint-Denis in 1968. She chaired the communist parliamentary group after the death of Jacques Duclos in 1975 until 1978.

In 1986, she received a six-month suspended sentence and 8,000 franc fine for electoral fraud in the municipal elections of Noisy-le-Grand.
