= Françoise Castex =

French politician

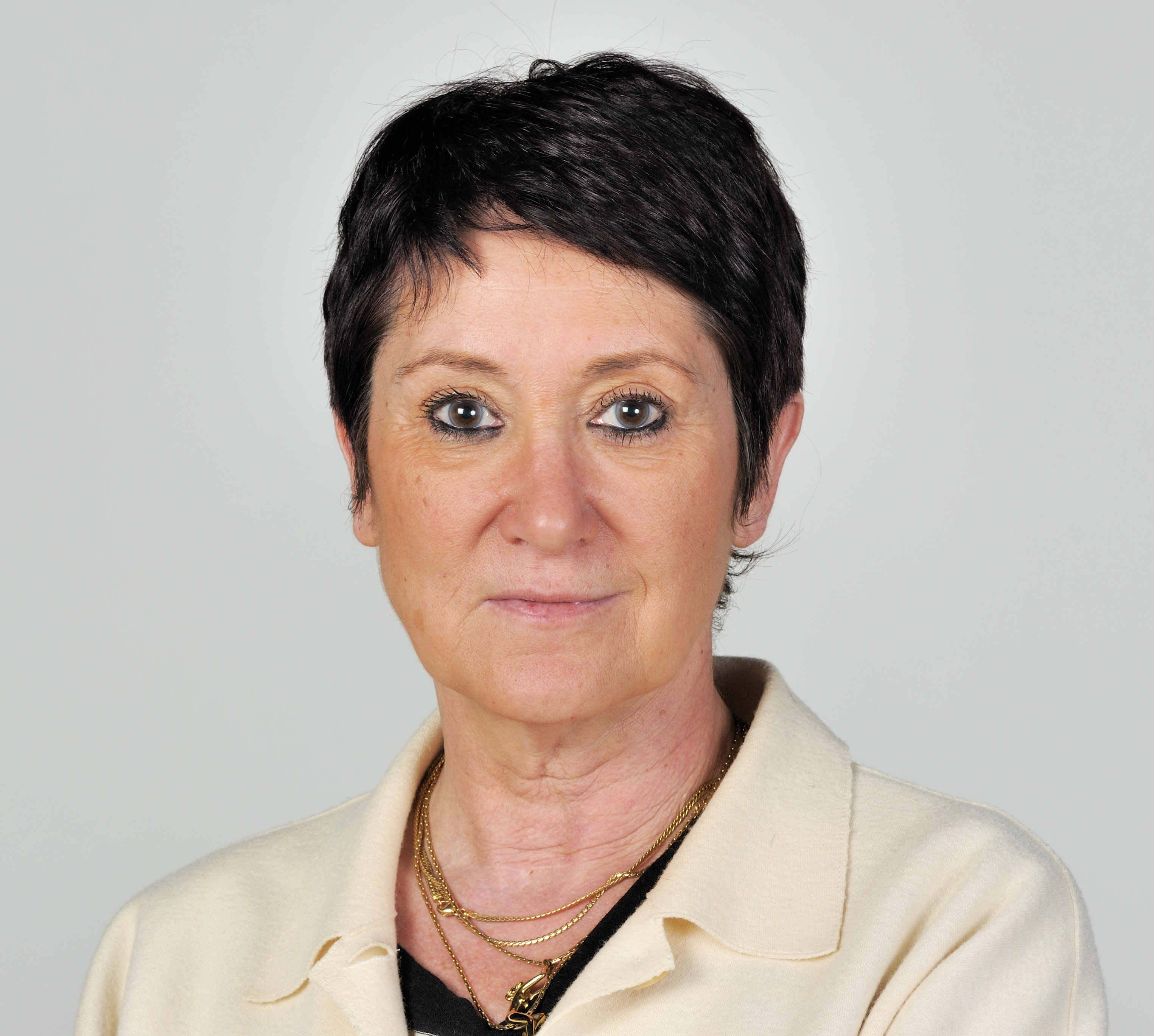
Françoise Castex (2014)

Françoise Castex (born 7 February 1956) is a French politician.

== Education ==
Castex was born in Agadir and obtained a degree and master's degree in arts in the 1970s. In 1990 she obtained a Diploma of Advanced Studies in the Social Field (DHEPS), and the following year a Postgraduate diploma in educational science.

== Early career ==
- 1981-1998: Adult and youth education adviser at the Gers Departmental Youth and Sports Directorate
- 1998-2000: Adviser in the office of the Chairman of the Gers Departmental Council
- Adviser in the office of the Minister responsible for vocational education
- 2002-2004: Special adviser for educational cooperation in the Foreign Ministry
- 2004-2014: Member of the European Parliament (S&D)
- 1989-1998: Deputy Secretary-General of the Adult Education Association (SEP-FEN-UNSA)
- since 1990: Member of the Socialist Party national council
- 1996-2001: Member of Lavardens Municipal Council
- 1990-1998: Chairwoman of the Gers League of Human Rights
- 1996-1998: Member of the Central committee of the League of Human Rights

== Member of the European Parliament, 2004–2014 ==
Between 2004 and 2014, Castex served as a Member of the European Parliament for the South West of France with the Socialist Party, part of the Socialist Group and sat on the European Parliament's Committee on International Trade.

She was a substitute for the Committee on Development and the Committee on Employment and Social Affairs. She also served as a member of the Delegation for relations with the Palestinian Legislative Council.

Together with Liêm Hoang Ngoc, Castex was one of two sitting MEPs who were not re-nominated by the leadership of France's Socialist Party for the 2014 European elections.
