= Anne Laperrouze =

French politician (born 1956)

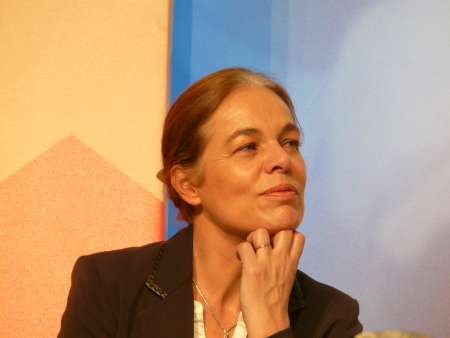
Anne Laperrouze at a Mouvement démocrate convention in 2009

Anne Laperrouze (born 4 July 1956 in Puylaurens, Tarn) is a French politician who served as a Member of the European Parliament for the south-west of France from 2004 to 2009. She was a member of the Union for French Democracy and is a member of DEMocratic MOvement (MoDem), which is part of the Alliance of Liberals and Democrats for Europe.

In parliament, Laperrouze served on the Committee on Industry, Research and Energy. She was also a substitute for the European Parliament Committee on Agriculture and Rural Development and the Committee on the Environment, Public Health and Food Safety. In this capacity, she led the Parliament's negotiations on a 2008 directive that set water standards for the EU's lakes, rivers and coastlines.

In addition to her committee assignments, Laperrouze was part of the delegation for relations with the People's Republic of China, and a substitute of the delegation for relations with the countries of Central America.

MoDem chairman François Bayrou included Laperrouze in his shadow cabinet in 2010, in preparation for the 2012 French presidential election; in this capacity, Laperrouze served as opposition counterpart to Éric Besson.

== Career ==
- Electrochemical-electrometallurgical engineer (Grenoble, 1978)
- Research assistant, University of Quebec at Chicoutimi (1978)
- Export assistant in the petrochemical industry (1980)
- Head of department in the metallurgical industry (1981–1990)
- Head of department in the motor vehicle industry (1991–2000)
- Project director in the pharmaceutical industry (2002–2004)
- Mayor of Puylaurens (since 2001)
- Member of the Tarn Departmental Council
