= Raymond Vall =

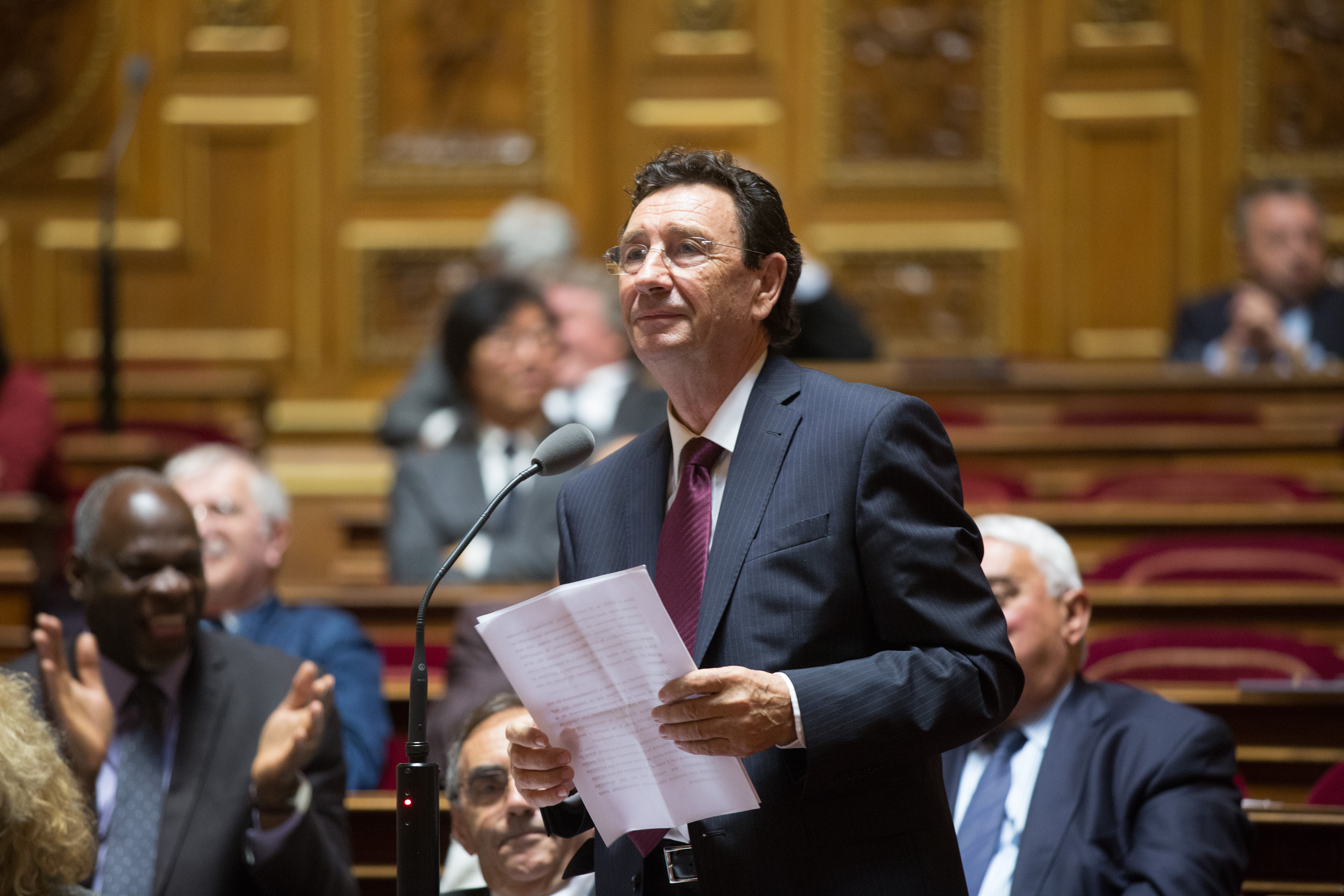
Raymond Vall in 2015

Raymond Vall (born 13 January 1942 in Fleurance) is a member of the Senate of France, representing the Gers department. He is a member of the Radical Party of the Left.
