= 2006 French Socialist Party presidential primary =

Socialist Party presidential primary, 2006
- 16 November 2006
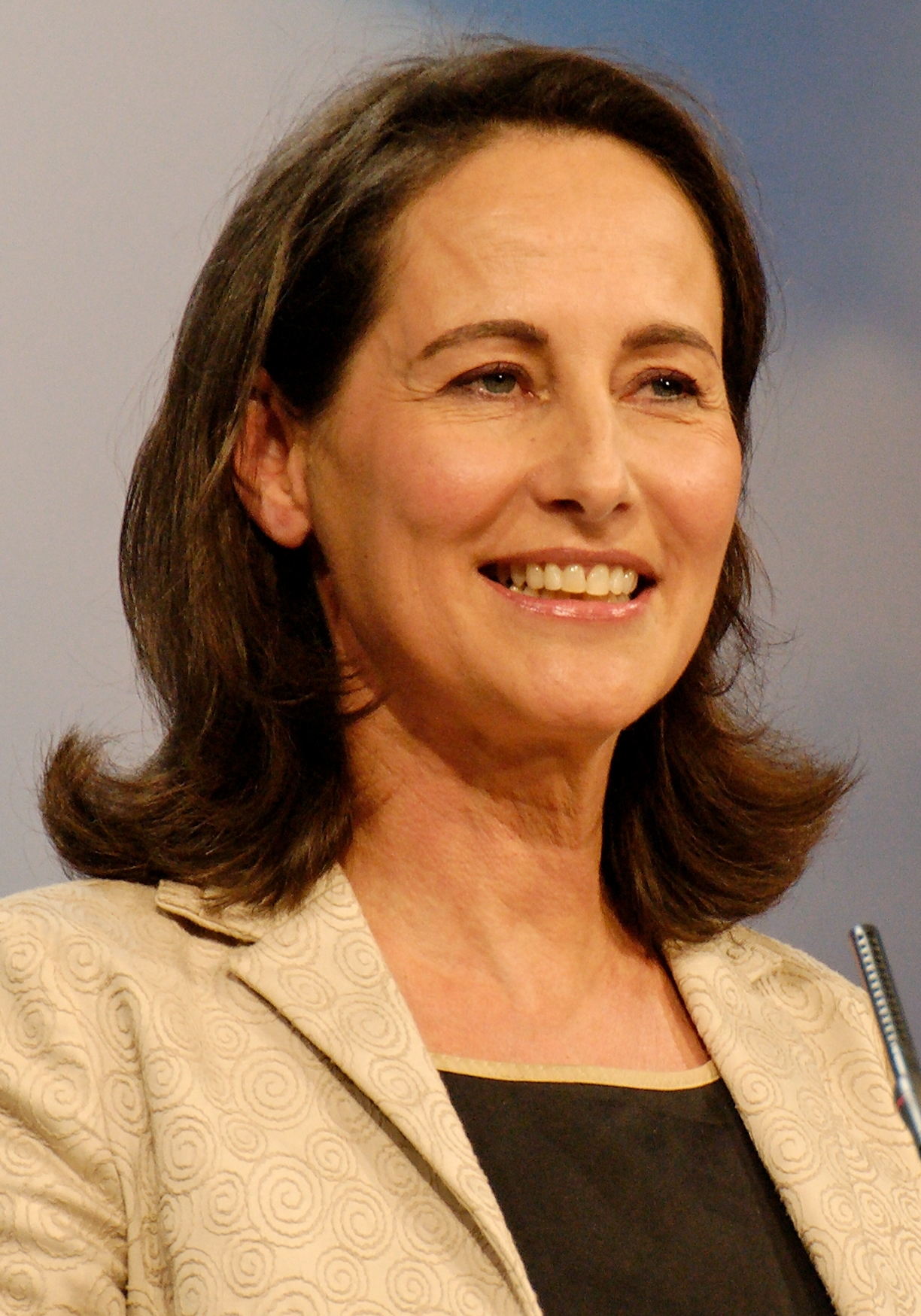

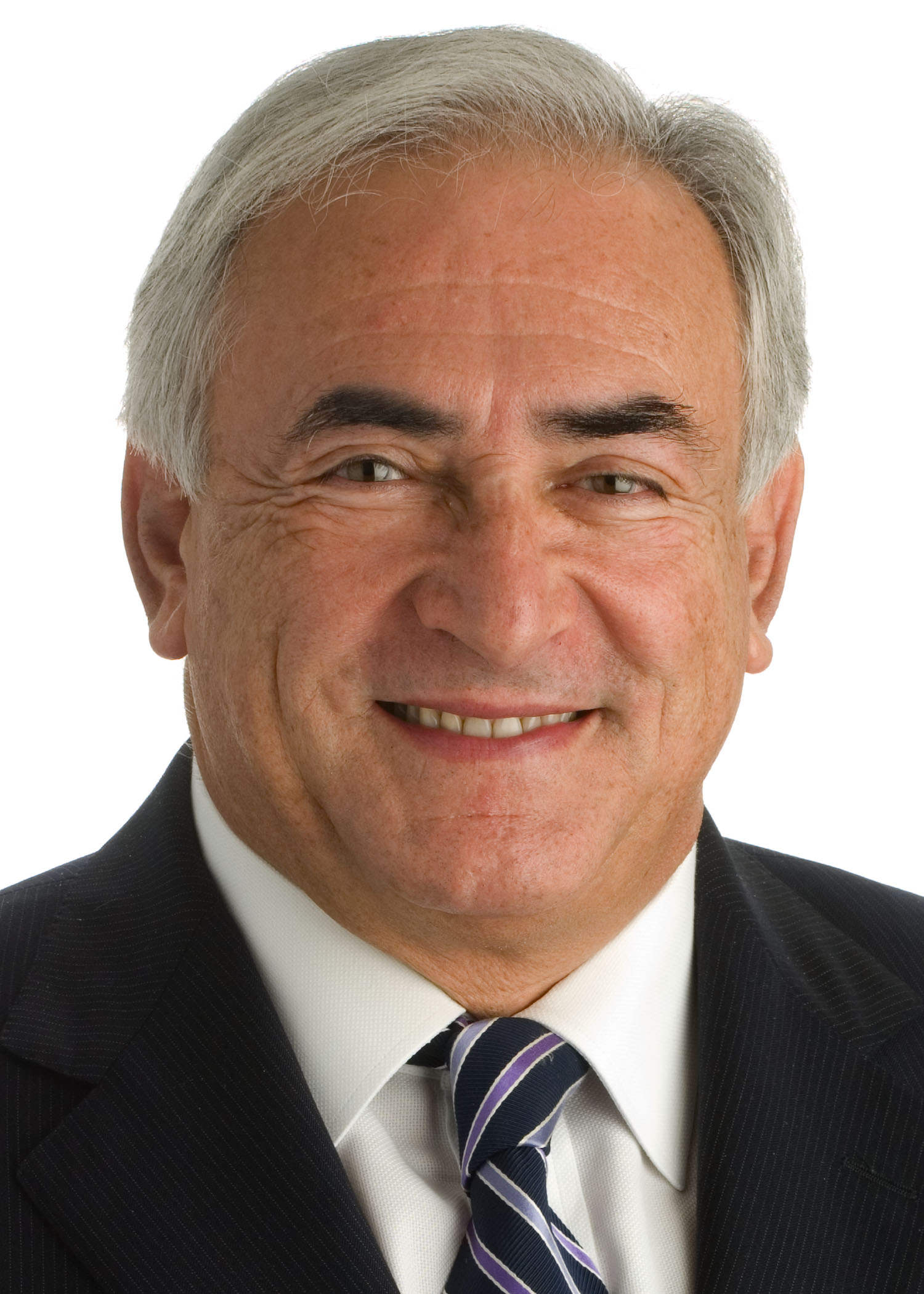

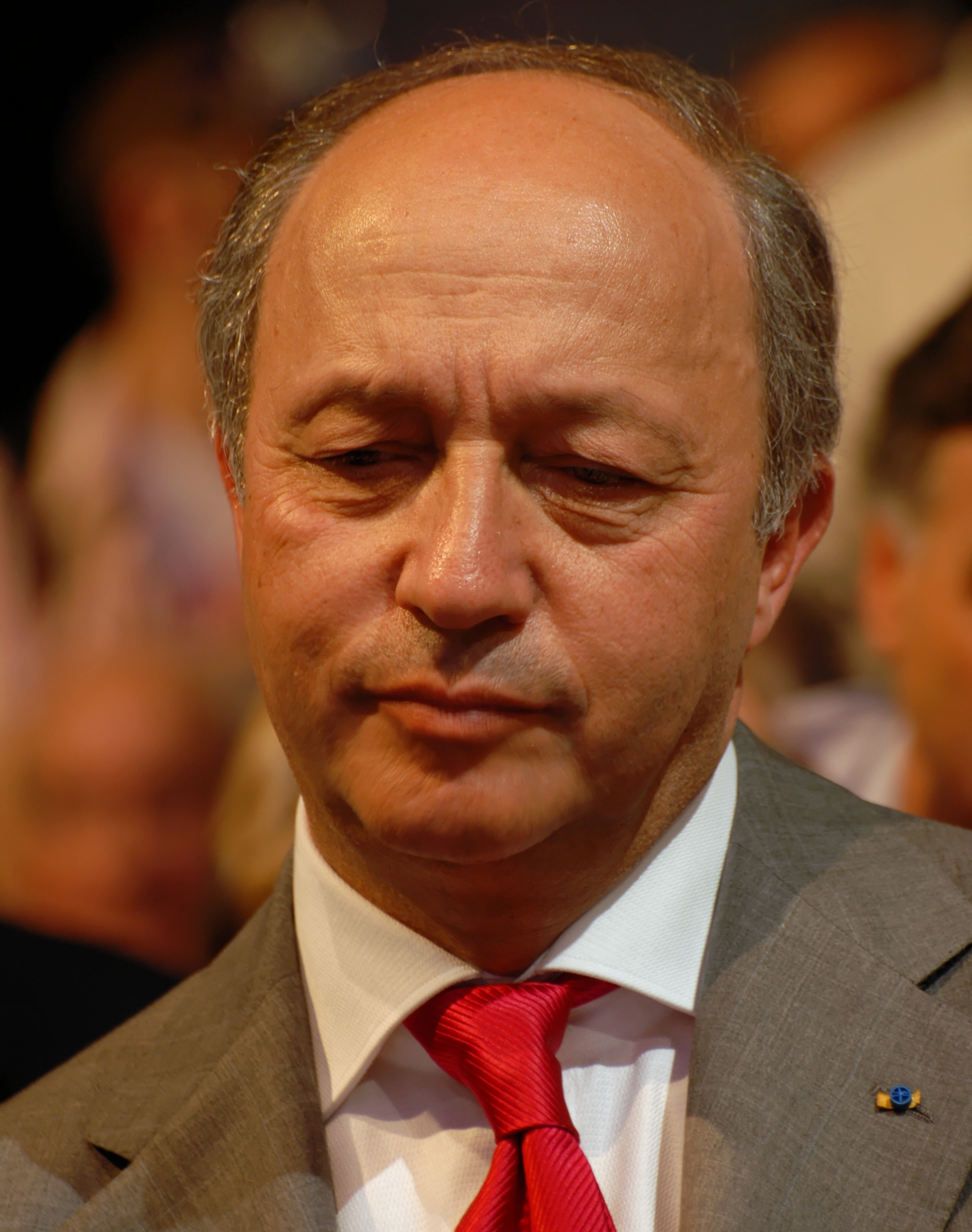
Nominee	Ségolène Royal	Dominique Strauss-Kahn	Laurent Fabius
Party	PS	PS	PS
Popular vote	108,807	37,118	33,487
Percentage	60.65%	20.69%	18.66%
- Results by department and region
Previous Socialist nominee
Lionel Jospin
Socialist nominee
Ségolène Royal

The Socialist Party presidential primary of 2006 was the selection process by which members of the Socialist Party of France chose their candidate for the 2007 French presidential election. In a nationwide vote on 16 November 2006, members of the party chose the regional president of Poitou-Charentes, Ségolène Royal. This historic vote made Royal the first woman to be nominated by a major party for the office of President of France.

Royal faced two significant rivals in the campaign, a former Minister of Finance, Dominique Strauss-Kahn, and a former Prime Minister, Laurent Fabius. With a lively public style and a dominant presence on the Internet, Royal managed to upend her more established opponents. She followed this victory with a spirited fight in the 2007 French presidential election, but ultimately lost to conservative UMP candidate Nicolas Sarkozy.

== Background ==
At the 2005 Socialist Party congress in Le Mans, Dominique Strauss-Kahn and Laurent Fabius had both been considered top contenders for the next year's nomination. Strauss-Kahn, a wealthy and high-profile economist, was derided by many Socialists as a Blairite, but he still possessed a lengthy record of consequence which guaranteed him a place on the primary's shortlist. Fabius, the more traditional Socialist of the two, had seemed particularly ascendant after the distinct leftward tilt of the Le Mans congress and its resultant party platform.

The November primary had a registration date of 1 October 2006. From early in the year, speculation grew about other candidacies including those of the former Minister of Culture Jack Lang, the former Minister of Health Bernard Kouchner, and even Lionel Jospin, the Socialists' previous nominee for President in the 2002 national election. Jospin was nominally in retirement after his disastrous loss, but he was still considered a potential entrant in the primary. When he formally announced on 28 September that he would not register for the primary, he left open the option of supporting any of the other candidates except one – Ségolène Royal.

=== Ségolène Royal ===
Royal was the regional president of Poitou-Charentes and a deputy to the National Assembly for Deux-Sèvres. She had already expressed her eagerness to run in an interview with Paris Match in 2005. She refined a national profile and officially registered on 29 September in Vitrolles. Royal ran her campaign on issues of party reform, stressing the debilities of the traditional leadership and the need for fresh ideas. Jospin – a three-decade fixture in French politics – held her in scorn for her "pure demagoguery". When he withdrew the race amid crumbling support in opinion polls, it was widely seen as a victory for the reformist Royal.

Like Jospin, other party elders largely rejected Royal too, partly for her perceived willingness to modify classic Socialist principles, but also for her relatively flamboyant and charismatic campaign style, unconventional in French politics. Her personal relationship with Socialist Party leader François Hollande complicated the situation: she was his longtime domestic partner, and mother of their four children. Hollande, who had harbored ambitions of his own for the primary, acquiesced to his partner and thereafter attempted to remain officially neutral.

== Campaign ==
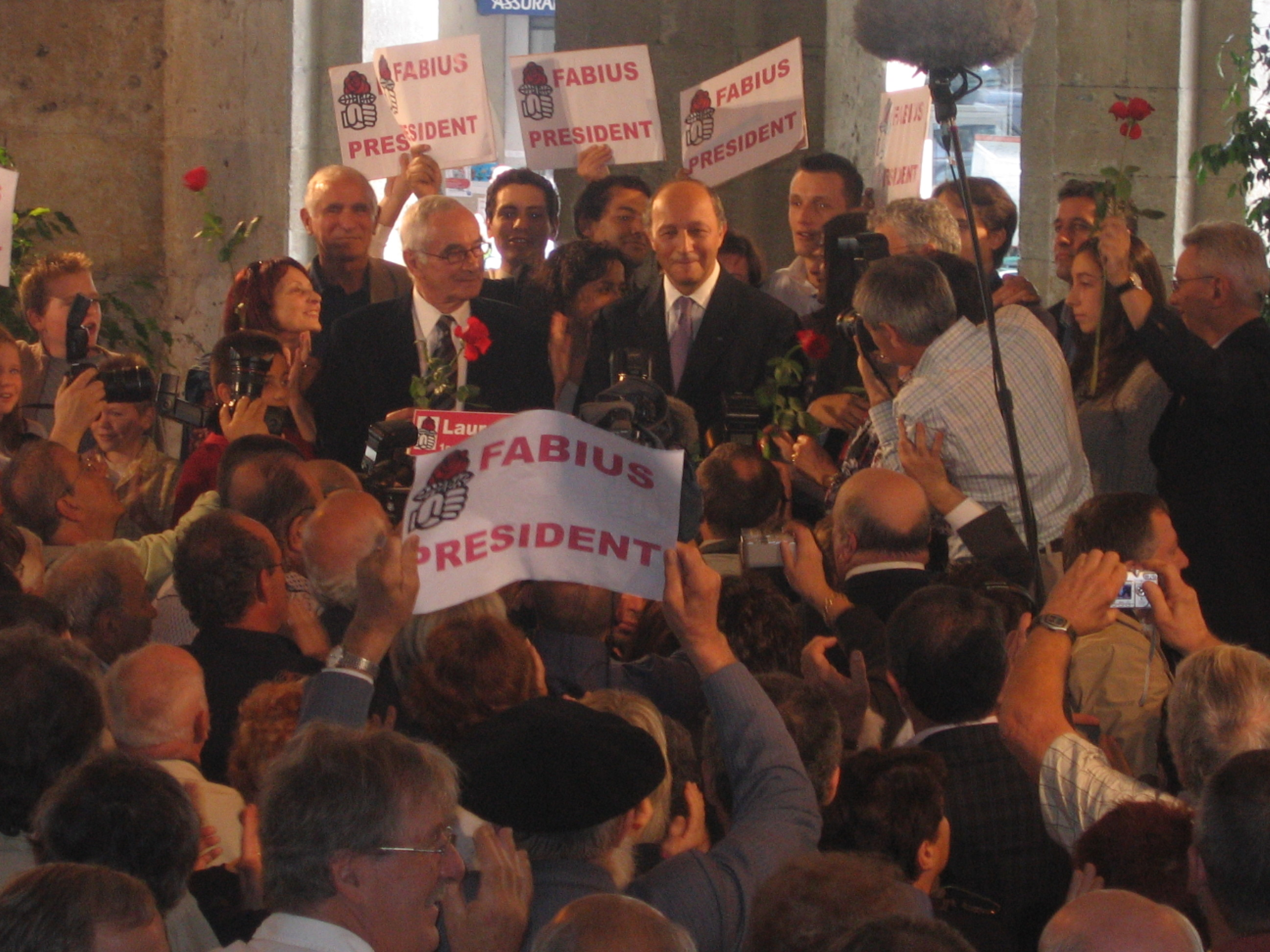
Fabius and supporters celebrating in Fleurance after his official registration

By the end of September, Lang and Kouchner gave up their struggling bids for the nomination and each offered a modest endorsement of Royal. Strauss-Kahn, however, officially registered his candidacy on 30 September, followed by Fabius the next day. The two men presented Royal with formidable competition: Strauss-Kahn had been Minister of the Economy and Fabius was a former Prime Minister, but the relatively unknown Royal nonetheless commanded an early lead in polls.

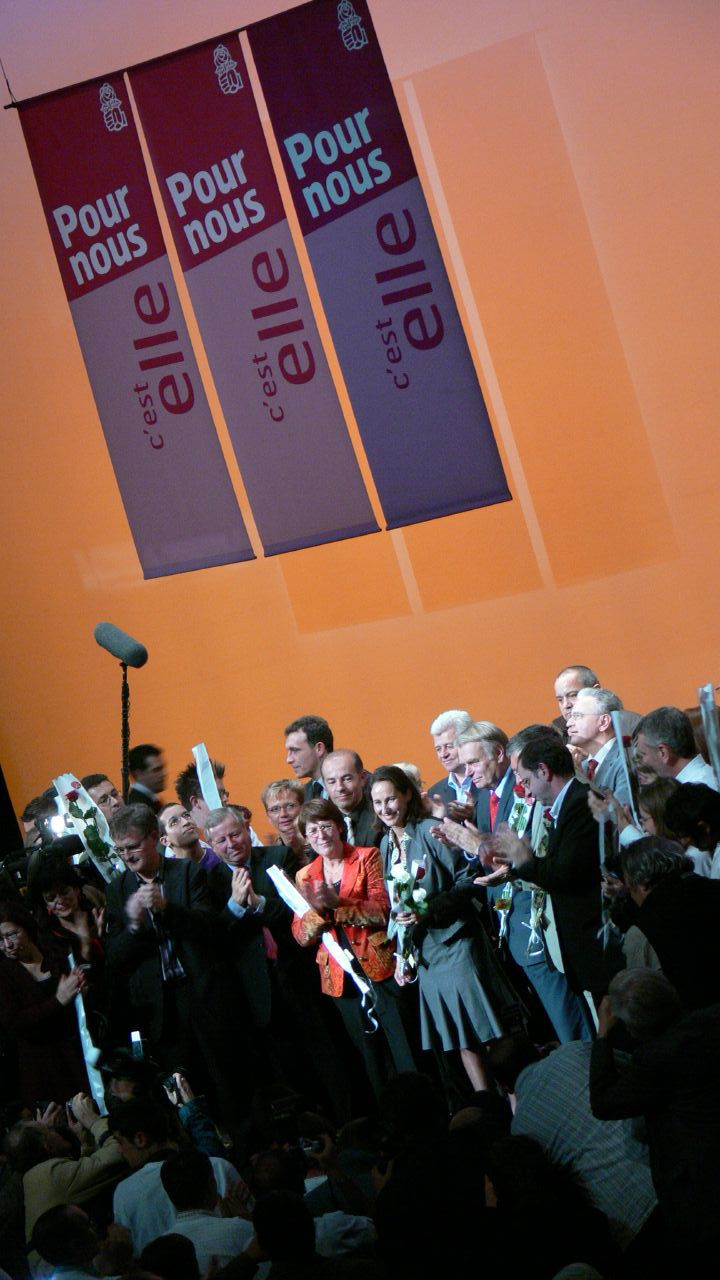
Royal at a rally in Nantes on the eve of the primary

Strauss-Kahn and Fabius each had solid blocs of political support, but Royal had a larger audience. She was a relentless campaigner, and her novel quality of sex appeal helped to bestow her with a celebrity status beyond that of her rivals. She employed the Internet, using social media outlets and popularizing her own Desirs D'avenir political website. Fortified by a host of supportive bloggers, Royal's Internet presence helped her to hold popular attention and maintain momentum in the race.

The candidates participated in three televised public debates, as well as three internal party debates among members only. Royal held onto a sizable lead, though it eroded steadily through the final weeks.

== Voting ==
The primary vote took place among the party's 219,000 members on 16 November 2006, with over 80% of eligible voters casting ballots. Royal won by a wide margin with 108,807 votes, 60.6% of the total, while Strauss-Kahn and Fabius divided the remainder almost evenly. With this victory, Royal became the first woman candidate of a major party to stand for the Presidency of France.

== Aftermath ==
Royal campaigned vigorously through the 2007 presidential election, but lost to conservative UMP candidate Nicolas Sarkozy, obtaining 46.9% of the final vote.

After her defeat, many party members openly disesteemed the primary system, which was new to the Socialists and only used once before. Royal's unexpectedly powerful victory in the primary was criticized as a failure of the system. Widely varying plans to redesign the 2011 primary coalesced into a grand bargain which would allow certain non-members of the party to cast ballots: in a process both experimental and controversial, voting rights for 2011 were made available (for a nominal registration fee) to any party "sympathizer". Approximately 2.5 million people cast ballots in the presidential primary of 2011, more than a tenfold increase in the number of voters from 2006.

All three of the main contenders remained active and influential in French politics long after the 2006 primary. Fabius assumed the office of Foreign Minister in 2012. Strauss-Kahn became head of the International Monetary Fund and in early 2011 was considered the frontrunner for the primary, but ultimately he decided not to run. Royal retained her regional leadership in Poitou-Charentes and even pursued a second presidential nomination in 2011, albeit with limited results.
