= Françoise Laborde =

French politician

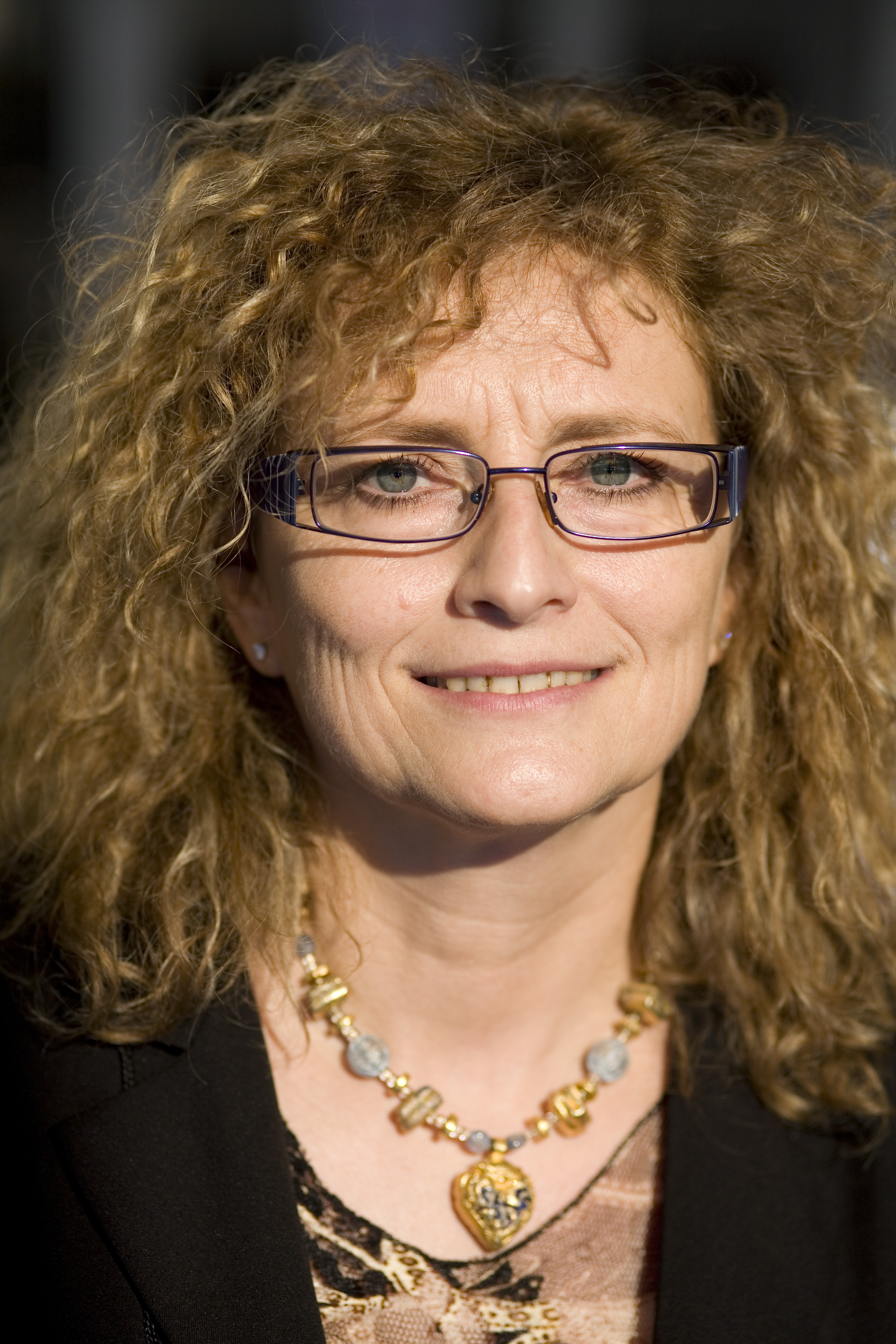

Member of the French Senate for Haute-Garonne
- Incumbent
- Assumed office 1 October 2008

Personal details
- Born: 8 July 1958 (age 67) Saint-Maur-des-Fossés, France
- Party: La République En Marche!
- Profession: Teacher

Françoise Laborde (born 8 July 1958) is a member of the Senate of France, representing the Haute Garonne département. She was a member of the Radical Party of the Left before rallying the Mouvement Radical Social Libéral party.

== Biography ==
Françoise Laborde is a teacher by profession. She began her career as an elementary school teacher, then became a middle school teacher and kindergarten principal. Since her election to the Senate in 2008, she has devoted herself exclusively to politics.

She is a member of the Radical Left Party. Since 2001, she has been a city councilor in Blagnac, near Toulouse (Haute-Garonne).

On September 21, 2008, she was elected senator for Haute-Garonne. She sits in the Senate as part of the European Democratic and Social Rally group (RDSE) parliamentary group.

In December 2015, on behalf of the Comité Laïcité République (Secularism and Republic Committee), three members of the Observatoire de la laïcité (Secularism Observatory), namely Jean Glavany deputy for the Hautes-Pyrénées, Patrick Kessel, President of the Comité Laïcité République, and Françoise Laborde, published a joint statement criticizing the position of the Observatoire de la laïcité, which considered that there was “no problem of secularism in higher education.”

She is the mother of two children.

On January 27, 2017, she was among the PRG leaders who called for joining Emmanuel Macron movement.

== Bibliography ==
- Page on the Senate website
