= Jacques Mahéas =

French politician (1939–2022)

Mayor of Neuilly-sur-Marne
- In office 25 March 1977 – 5 July 2020
- Preceded by: André Kremser
- Succeeded by: Zartoshe Bakhtiari

Member of the National Assembly for Seine-Saint-Denis
- In office 23 June 1988 – 1 April 1993
- Succeeded by: Christian Demuynck

Member of the French Senate for Seine-Saint-Denis
- In office 1 October 1995 – 30 September 2011

Personal details
- Born: 10 July 1939; Paris, France
- Died: 20 August 2022 (aged 83); Nice, France
- Political party: Socialist Party
- Profession: Middle School Principal

Jacques Mahéas (10 July 1939 – 20 August 2022) was a French politician who was a member of the Senate, representing the Seine-Saint-Denis department. He was a member of the Socialist Party.

In 2010, Mahéas was found guilty of sexually harassing a female employee nearly six years earlier. He was fined, but kept his seat in the Senate.

Mahéas died on 20 August 2022 at the age of 83.
