= Jean-Pierre Plancade =

French politician

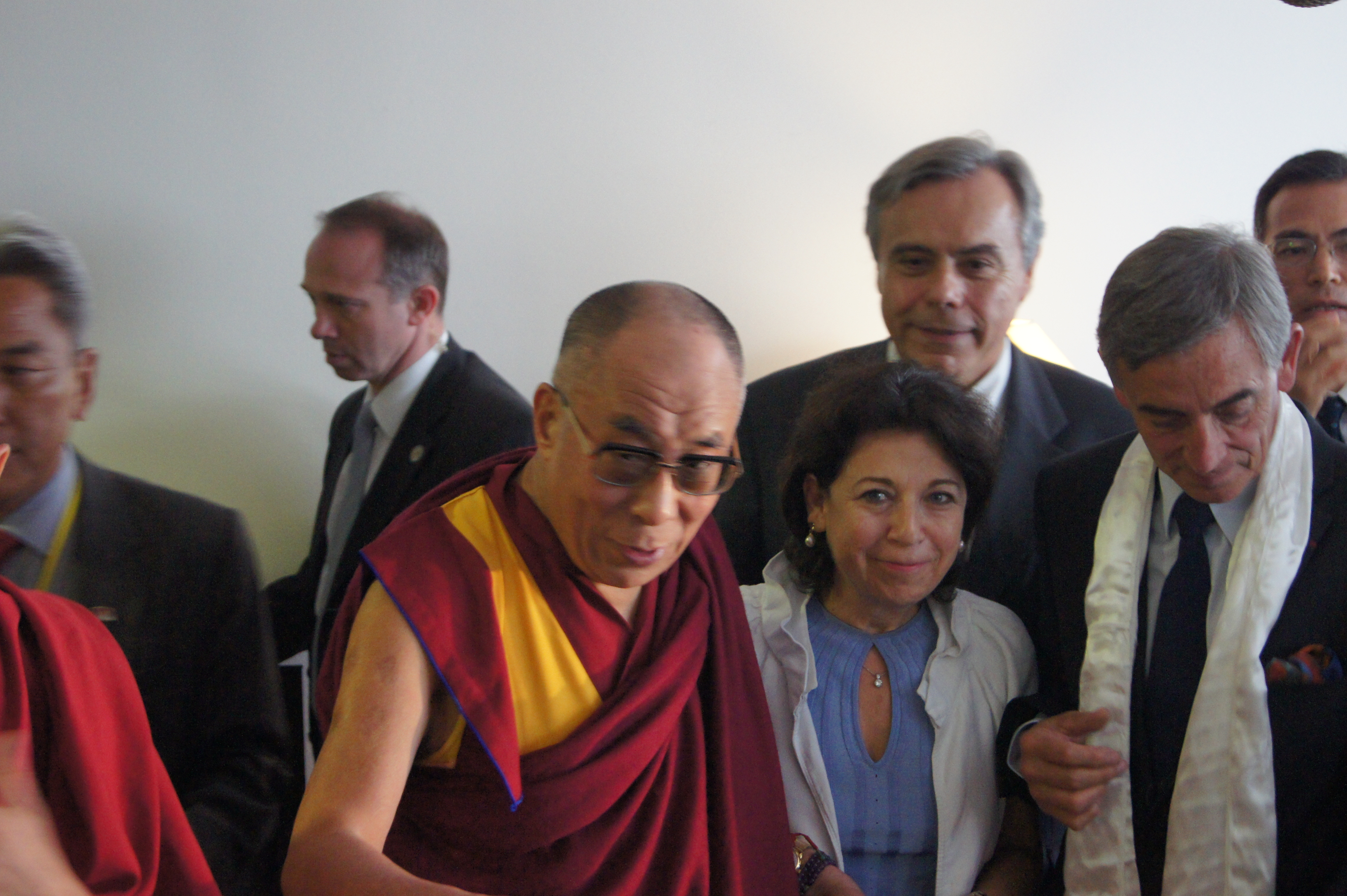
Jean-Pierre Plancade (in the middle, behind), at the meeting of Parliamentarians with the 14th Dalai Lama in Toulouse, August 15, 2011

Jean-Pierre Plancade (born 2 August 1949 in Toulouse) is a member of the Senate of France, representing the Haute-Garonne department. He is a member of the Radical Party of the Left.

== Bibliography ==
- Page on the Senate website
