= Jack Ralite =

French politician (1928–2017)

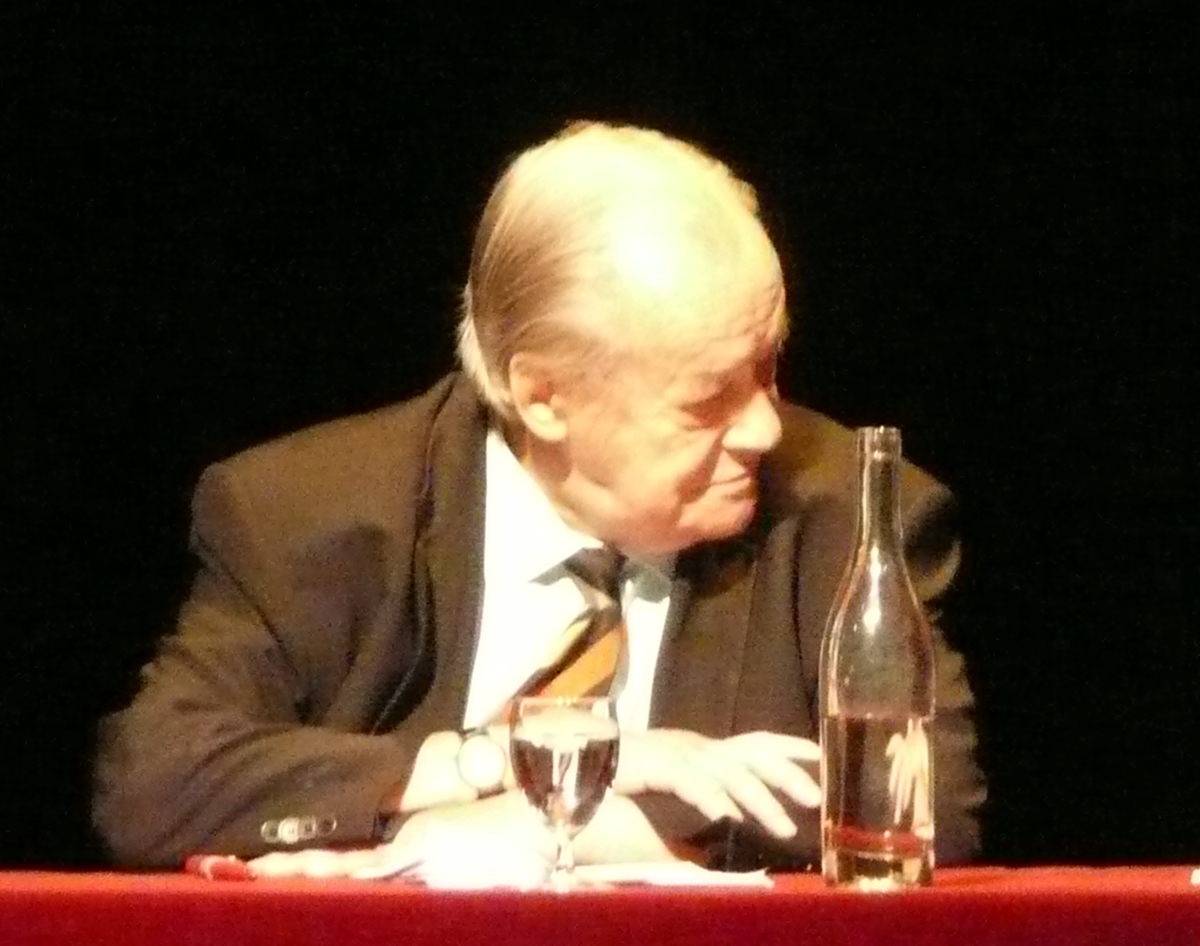
Jack Ralite in June 2011.

Jack Ralite (14 May 1928 – 12 November 2017) was a French politician. He was elected in 1973 to the Seine-Saint-Denis constituency for the French Communist Party. In 1981 he became Minister for Health and subsequently Minister for Employment (1981–1984).

While serving as Minister for Health, he implemented a new health care policy that included the abolition of private beds in hospitals, reform of medical training, modernisation of facilities, and the election of the heads of medical services by the entire staff, rather than just by doctors, as had previously been the case. As minister, Ralite removed homosexuality from the list of mental disorders.

In 1984 he became Mayor of Aubervilliers, a post he retained until 2003.
