= Michel Teychenné =

French politician

Michel Teychenné (born 22 July 1957 in Foix, Ariège) is a French politician and a former Member of the European Parliament for the south-west of France. He is a member of the Socialist Party, which is part of the Party of European Socialists.

He entered the European Parliament in October 2008, after the resignation of Robert Navarro, up until the 2009 elections.

A local councillor in Pamiers, Ariège, he is openly gay. He has claimed to be discriminated against for being gay in the 2010 regional elections.
