= Joël Batteux =

French politician (1943–2021)

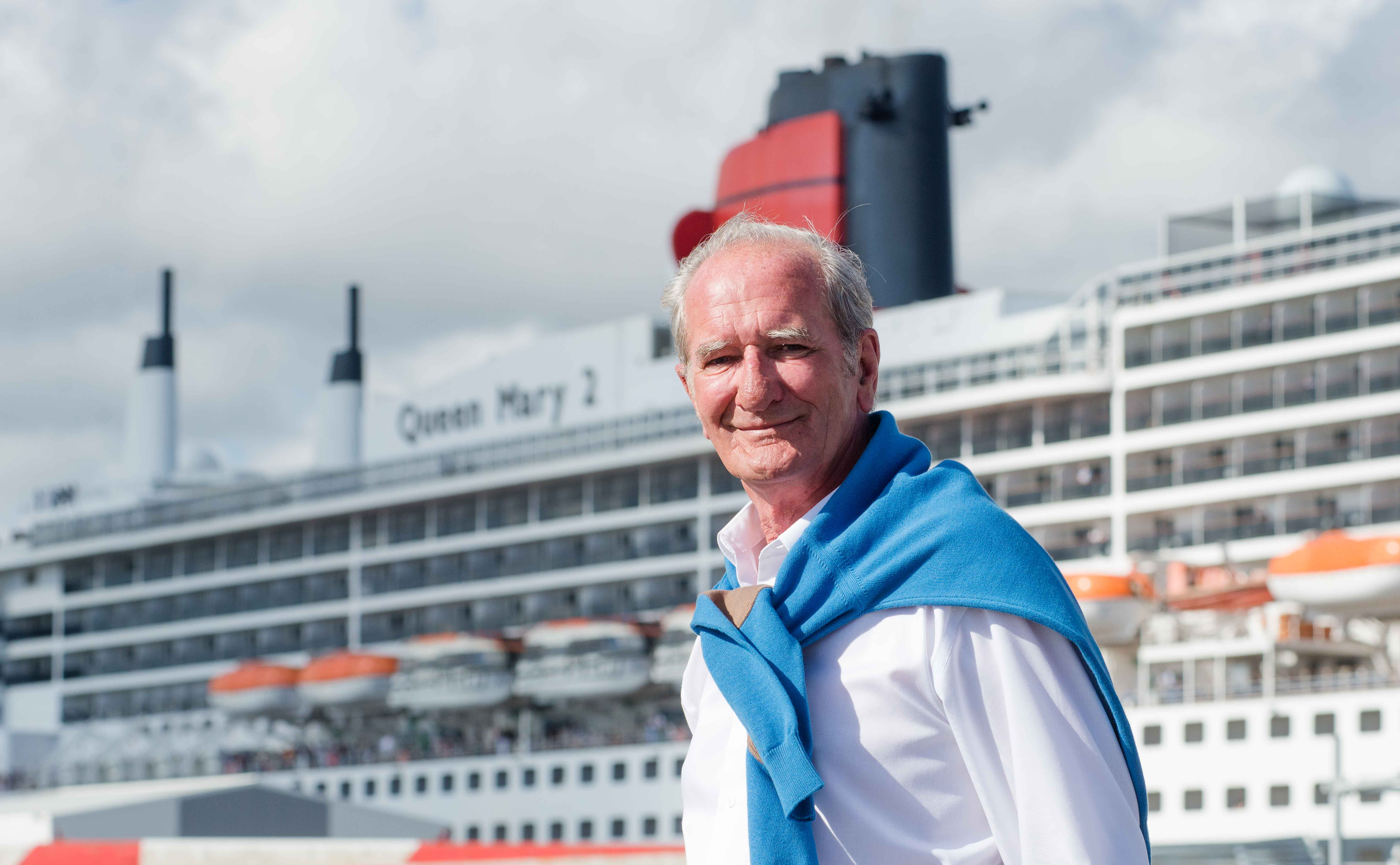

Mayor of Saint-Nazaire
- In office 22 March 1983 – 4 April 2014

Personal details
- Born: Joël-Guy Batteux; 16 December 1943 Vitré, France
- Died: 10 January 2021 (aged 77)
- Party: PS; MDC; AGR

Joël-Guy Batteux (16 December 1943 – 10 January 2021) was a French politician.

== Biography ==
Batteux member of the Socialist Party, the Citizens' Movement, and the Association pour une gauche républicaine before returning to the Socialist Party. He was elected Mayor of Saint-Nazaire in 1983 and served until 2014.

During the 1997 French legislative election, Batteux ran under the Citizens' Movement ticket for the National Assembly seat of Loire-Atlantique's 8th constituency. He received 26% of the vote in the first round, and ceded the seat to the Socialist Party's Claude Évin, who replaced the outgoing Deputy Étienne Garnier. He left the Citizens' Movement in 2002.

In 2008, Batteux was made a member of the Order of the British Empire for his services to relations between France and the United Kingdom as Mayor of Saint-Nazaire. On 23 November of that year, he temporarily took the job of first secretary of the Socialist Party, although he only held the position for a few days. In 2014, he decided not to stand in the mayoral election in Saint-Nazaire, allowing David Samzun to succeed him. In April 2014, he was appointed to the French Economic, Social and Environmental Council.

Joël Batteux died on 10 January 2021 at the age of 77 following complications from surgery.
