= Béatrice Patrie =

French politician and magistrate (born 1957)

Béatrice Patrie (born 12 May 1957 in Lorient) is a French former judge and Member of the European Parliament for the South West of France. She is a member of the Socialist Party, part of the Party of European Socialists.
