= Jean Milhau =

French politician (born 1929)

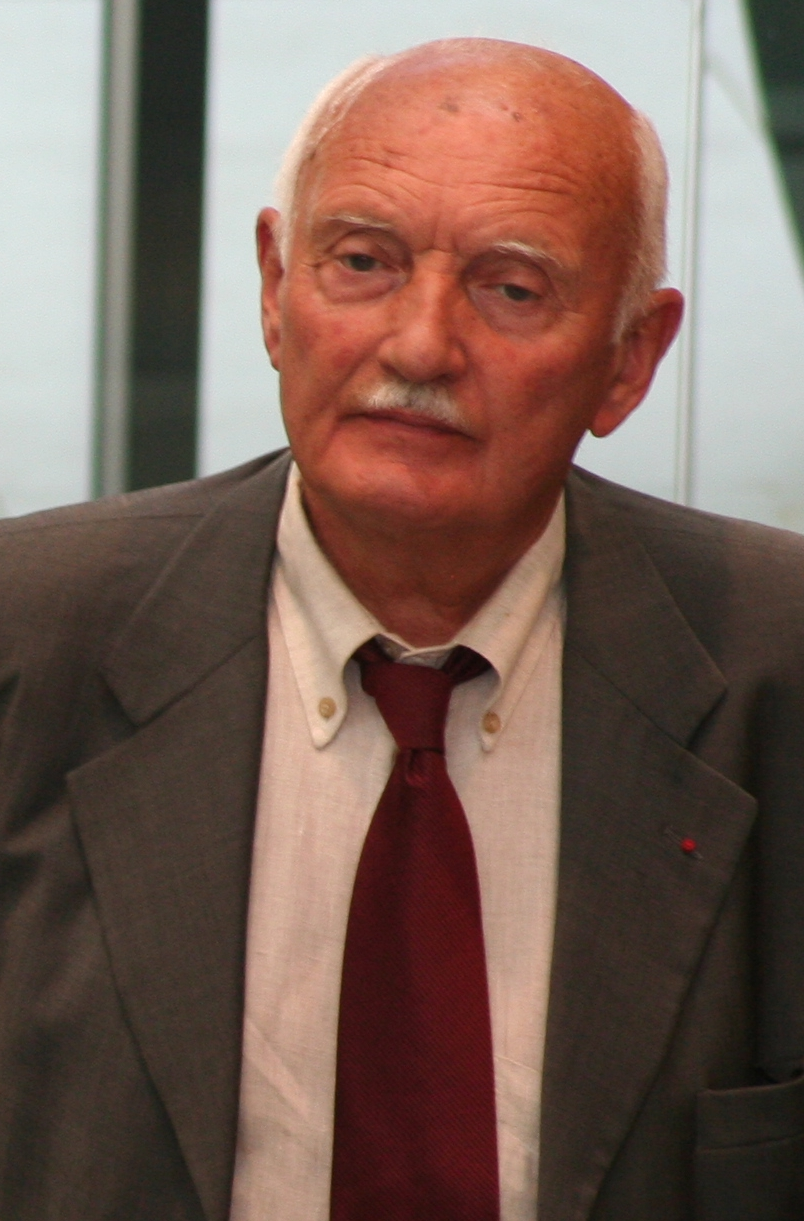
- Milhau in 2008

Deputy Mayor of Cazals, Lot
- In office 1959–1965

Mayor of Cazals
- In office 1965–1995

Senator for the Lot Département
- In office 28 September 2008 – 30 September 2011
- Preceded by: André Boyer

Personal details
- Born: 18 December 1929 (age 96) Castelfranc, Lot département, France
- Party: European Democratic and Social Rally (Rassemblement démocratique et social européen, RDSE); Party: Radical Party of the Left (Parti radical de gauche, PRG)

Jean Milhau (born 18 December 1929) is a retired French politician who was a member of the Senate of France, representing the Lot Département. He is a member of the Radical Party of the Left (French: Parti radical de gauche, PRG).

== Biography ==
A retired pharmacist, Milhau became a member of the Senate of France for the Lot Département on 25 September 2008, after the death of André Boyer, for whom he was deputy.

== Current positions ==
- Senator for Lot
- Town councillor in Cazals, Lot
- President of SYMICTOM for Gourdon, Lot

== Previous positions ==
- 1994–2004 : President of the General Council of Lot
- 1982–1994 : Vice. President of the General Council of Lot
- 1973–2004 : General Council of Lot for the canton of Cazals
- 1965–1995 : Mayor of Cazals
- 1959–1965 : Deputy mayor of Cazals.

== Awards ==
- Knight of the Ordre national du Mérite, 1979
- Knight of the Légion d'honneur, 1988
- Officer of the Légion d'honneur, 1997.

== See also ==
- Cazals, Lot
