= Christian Demuynck =

French politician

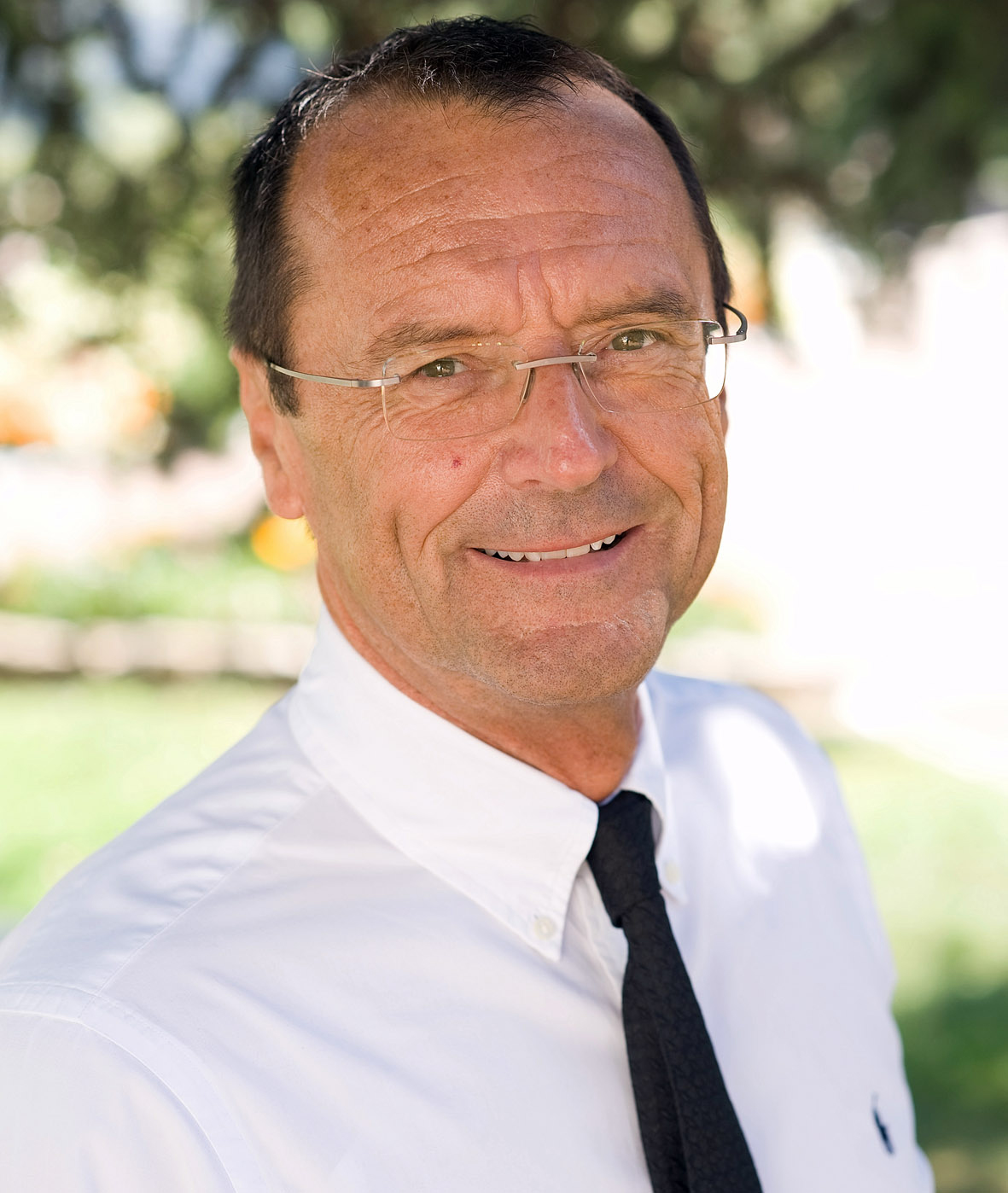

Mayor of Neuilly-Plaisance
- Incumbent
- Assumed office 13 March 1983
- Preceded by: André Macé

Member of the French Senate for Seine-Saint-Denis
- In office 24 September 1995 – 30 September 2011

Personal details
- Born: 24 July 1947 (age 78) Le Perreux-sur-Marne, France
- Party: UMP
- Profession: Teacher

Christian Demuynck (born 24 July 1947) was a member of the Senate of France. He represented the Seine-Saint-Denis department and is a member of the Union for a Popular Movement Party.
