= Alain Juppé =

French politician (born 1945)

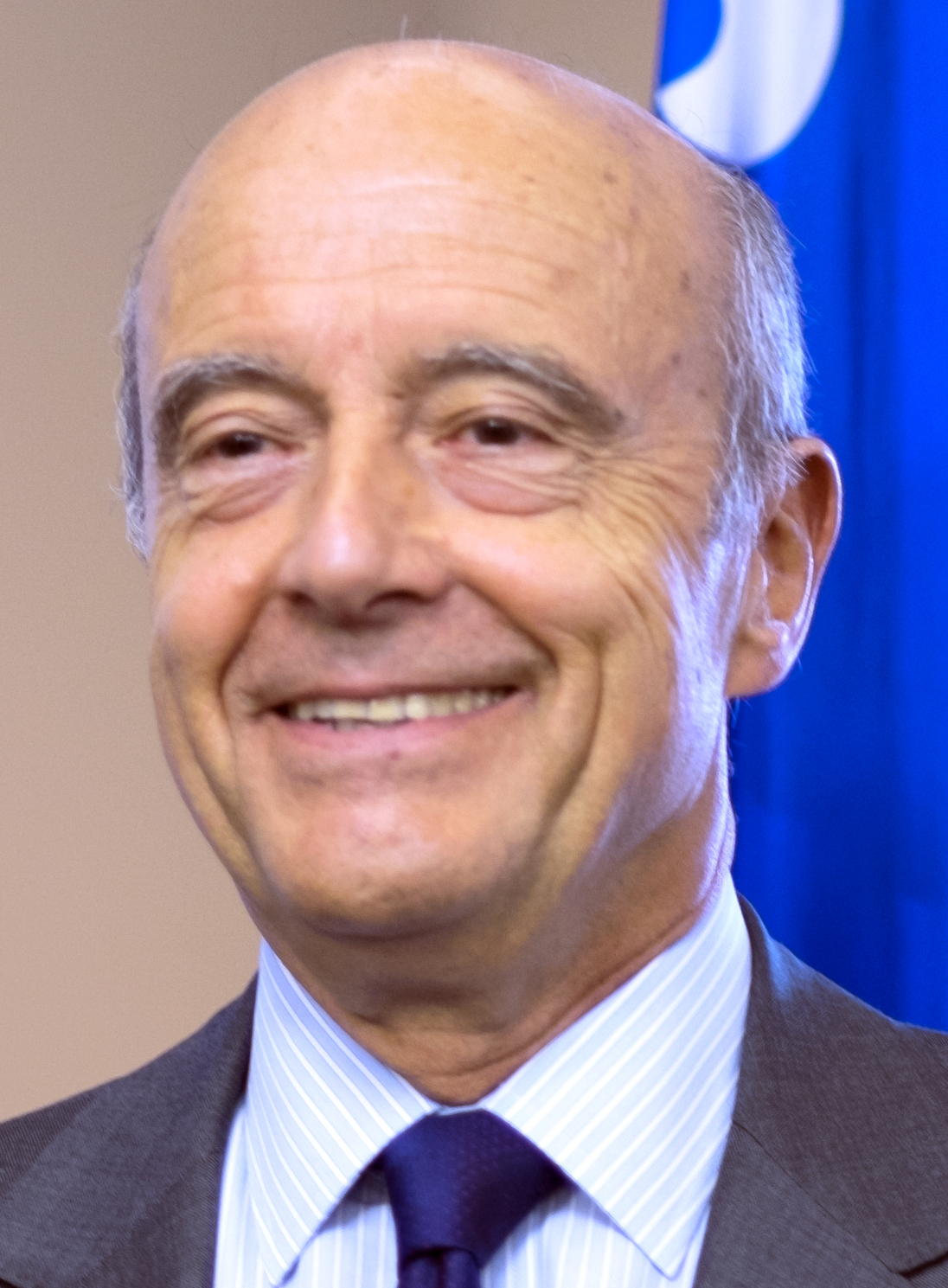
- Juppé in 2015

Member of the Constitutional Council
- Incumbent
- Assumed office 12 March 2019
- Appointed by: Richard Ferrand
- President: Laurent Fabius; Richard Ferrand
- Preceded by: Lionel Jospin

Prime Minister of France
- In office 17 May 1995 – 2 June 1997
- President: Jacques Chirac
- Preceded by: Édouard Balladur
- Succeeded by: Lionel Jospin

Minister of Foreign and European Affairs
- In office 27 February 2011 – 15 May 2012
- President: Nicolas Sarkozy
- Prime Minister: François Fillon
- Preceded by: Michèle Alliot-Marie
- Succeeded by: Laurent Fabius
- In office 29 March 1993 – 18 May 1995
- Prime Minister: Édouard Balladur
- Preceded by: Roland Dumas
- Succeeded by: Hervé de Charette

Minister of Defence and Veterans Affairs
- In office 14 November 2010 – 27 February 2011
- President: Nicolas Sarkozy
- Prime Minister: François Fillon
- Preceded by: Hervé Morin (Defence)
- Succeeded by: Gérard Longuet

Minister of Ecology and Sustainable Development
- In office 18 May 2007 – 18 June 2007
- President: Nicolas Sarkozy
- Prime Minister: François Fillon
- Preceded by: Nelly Olin (Environment)
- Succeeded by: Jean-Louis Borloo (Ecology, Energy, Sustainable Development and Sea)

Mayor of Bordeaux
- In office 8 October 2006 – 7 March 2019
- Preceded by: Hugues Martin
- Succeeded by: Nicolas Florian
- In office 19 June 1995 – 13 December 2004
- Preceded by: Jacques Chaban-Delmas
- Succeeded by: Hugues Martin

Spokesperson of the Government
- In office 20 March 1986 – 10 May 1988
- Prime Minister: Jacques Chirac
- Preceded by: Georgina Dufoix
- Succeeded by: Claude Évin

Delegate Minister of the Budget
- In office 20 March 1986 – 10 May 1988
- Prime Minister: Jacques Chirac
- Preceded by: Henri Emmanuelli
- Succeeded by: Pierre Bérégovoy

Personal details
- Born: Alain Marie Juppé; 15 August 1945 (age 81) Mont-de-Marsan, Aquitaine, France
- Party: RPR (before 2002); UMP (2002–15); The Republicans (2015–18)
- Spouses: Christine Leblond (m. 1965; div. 1993) Isabelle Legrand-Bodin (m. 1993)
- Children: 3
- Education: École normale supérieure Sciences Po; École nationale d'administration

Alain Marie Juppé OQ ([alɛ̃ maʁi ʒype]; born 15 August 1945) is a French politician. A member of The Republicans, he was Prime Minister of France from 1995 to 1997 under President Jacques Chirac, during which period he faced major strikes that paralysed the country and became very unpopular. He left office after the victory of the left in the snap 1997 legislative elections. He had previously served as Minister of Foreign Affairs from 1993 to 1995, and as Minister of the Budget and Spokesman for the Government from 1986 to 1988. He was president of the political party Union for a Popular Movement (UMP) from 2002 to 2004 and mayor of Bordeaux from 2006 to 2019.

After the ghost jobs affair in December 2004, Juppé suspended his political career until he was re-elected as mayor of Bordeaux in October 2006. He served briefly as Minister of State for Ecology and Sustainable Development in 2007, but resigned in June 2007 after failing in his bid to be re-elected in the 2007 legislative election. He was Minister of Defence and Veterans Affairs from 2010 to 2011 and Minister of Foreign Affairs from 2011 to 2012.

Juppé announced in 2015 his intention to contest his party's primary election ahead of the 2017 presidential election. He came in second place in the first open primary of the right and centre, and in the run-off, he lost to François Fillon. At the beginning of 2019, he accepted a nomination to become a member of the French Constitutional Council and subsequently announced that he would be resigning as mayor of Bordeaux.

== Early life ==
Juppé was born Alain Marie Juppé on 15 August 1945, in Mont-de-Marsan, Aquitaine. His father was Robert Juppé (1915-1998), a Gaullist resistance fighter at the end of World War II, who came from a family of railwaymen and later became a farmer, and his mother was Marie Darroze (1910-2004), the devoted Catholic daughter of a judge.

His secondary studies took place at the Lycée Victor-Duruy (Landes). At 17, he graduated with a Baccalauréat. He then came to Paris for a literary preparatory classe at the Lycée Louis-le-Grand and entered the École Normale Supérieure (ENS) in 1964 to get a Classics agrégation in 1967. He completed his degrees at Sciences Po (1968) and at the National School of Administration (ENA) (1970-1972). From 1969 to 1970, he executed his compulsory military service.

== Political career ==
=== Early political career (1976–1986) ===
Alain Juppé's profession, outside politics, is Inspector of Finances, a position from which he was on leave to hold his various elected and appointed offices. He retired from the Inspection of Finances on 1 January 2003.

As a senior civil servant, he met Jacques Chirac at the end of the 1970s and became his adviser in the city council of Paris. In 1981, he was selected to be one of the first Young Leaders of the French-American Foundation.

A member of the RPR since its foundation in 1976, he lost his first attempts to be elected during the 1978 legislative elections and the 1979 cantonal elections. Then he moved to Paris to work with Chirac as one of the closest advisors to the mayor. In 1979, he was elected at the national board of the party. Two years later, he became the second manager of Chirac's campaign for the presidential election. Chirac ended third with 18% of the vote.

With Michel Aurillac, he led the club 89, officially a think tank, indeed a sort of counter-government to prepare the 1986 legislative elections. The victory of the RPR-UDF alliance in this ballot made Socialist President Mitterrand appointing Chirac as his Prime Minister.

=== Cabinet member (1986–1995) ===
He was minister of budget and spokesperson of Jacques Chirac's government from 1986 to 1988. He contributed to the free-market policy of Edouard Balladur, minister of Finances, during these years. During the 1988 presidential election, he combined these positions with those of spokesman of Chirac's campaign and head of his support committee.

Then, he was secretary general of the Rally for the Republic (Rassemblement pour la République or RPR) political party from 1988 to 1995. His role was to maintain Chirac's leadership on the party against the rise of the younger generation of "renovators" and of sovereignist Gaullists such as Philippe Séguin and Charles Pasqua. Pasqua humorously wrote in his Memoirs : "The RPR was now ruled like the North-Korean Communist Party... without the enlightened leadership of Kim Il Sung". He led the RPR-UDF alliance with former President Valéry Giscard d'Estaing for the 1989 European elections but resigned from the European Parliament some months later because he was only needed to be a kind of electoral locomotive. In 1992, Chirac and Juppé supported the treaty of Maastricht against the majority of the RPR's members. The Gaullist fringe then considered him as a traitor.

In 1993, he was made Édouard Balladur's Foreign Minister. Along with President Mitterrand, he advocated a French expedition in Rwanda to save the most possible of threaten lives, while Prime minister Balladur and Defense minister François Léotard were fearing a slip toward a colonial intervention. Juppé defended the Turquoise Operation at the United Nations. Some controversies have emerged later on this subject (in August 2008, he was named in a Rwandan government report on the alleged French connection in the Rwanda genocide during his tenure as Foreign Minister). From a general point of view, he has been considered to be one of the best Foreign ministers in France's recent history. Although he held the position of president of the RPR, he participated in the debate and endorsed Jacques Chirac instead of Balladur in the 1995 presidential election.

=== Prime Minister of France (1995–1997) ===
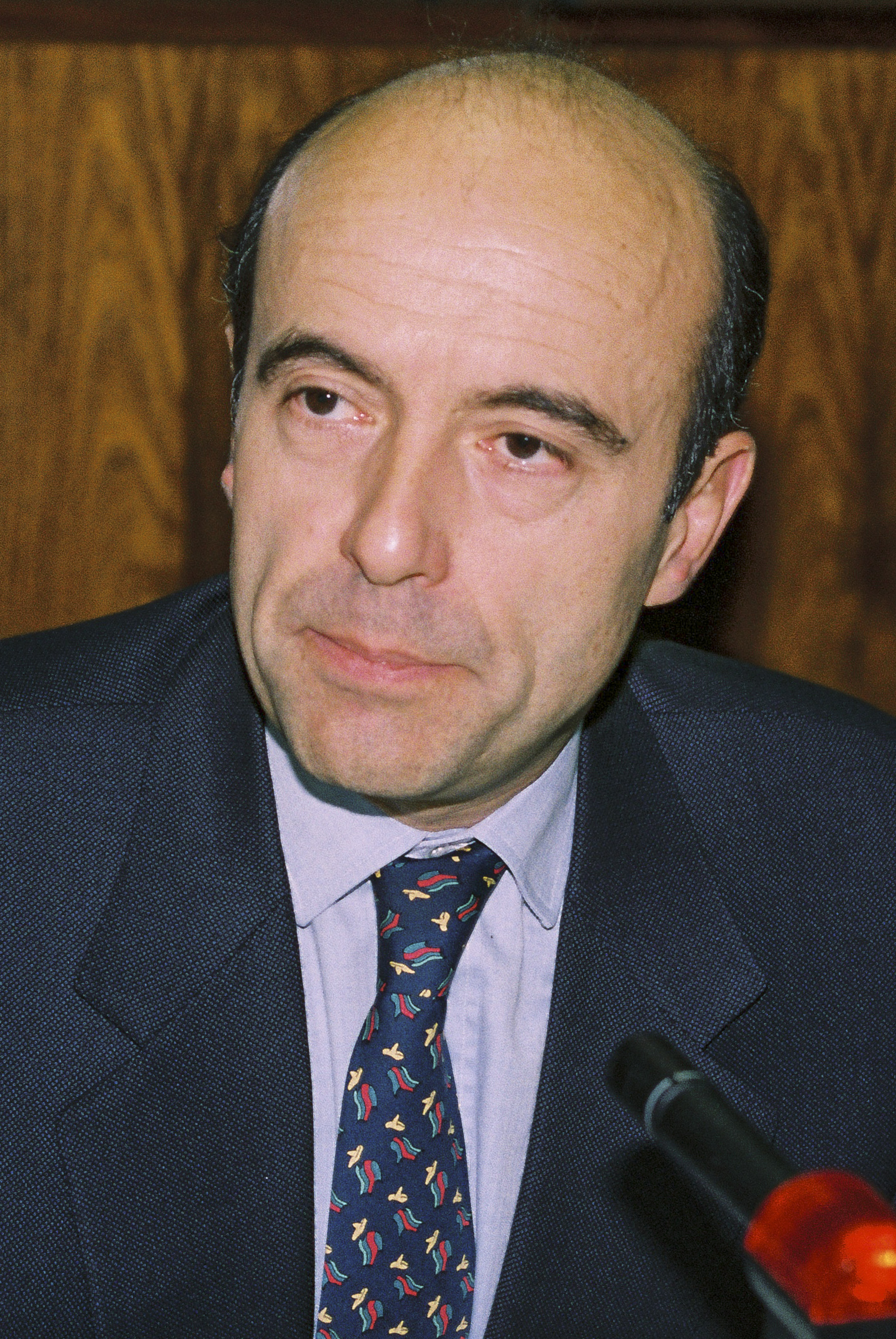
Juppé in 1995

Because he supported Jacques Chirac against Edouard Balladur during the 1995 presidential campaign, he succeeded him as Prime Minister, also becoming president of the RPR. Jacques Chirac claimed Alain Juppé was "the best among us".

However, in November/December 1995, his plan for Welfare State reform caused the biggest social conflict since May 68 and, under duress, abandoned it. He became the most unpopular Prime Minister of the Fifth Republic (challenged only by Édith Cresson).

In January 1996, Alain Juppé, together with interior minister Jean-Louis Debré, opened negotiations with the FLNC-Canal Historique, then the largest guerrilla group in the Corsican conflict. The ensuing Tralonca peace campaign became Juppé's priority in government, holding numerous meetings and conferences and even traveling to Corsica. the peace would fail in 1996 after the French government refused to release political prisoners arrested during the peace process.

In spring 1997, President Chirac dissolved the National Assembly but lost the legislative election. Alain Juppé was succeeded by the Socialist Lionel Jospin. Furthermore, Juppé left the leadership of the RPR.

He campaigned for the unification of all the parties of the centre right behind Jacques Chirac, resulting in the Union for the Presidential Majority which became the Union for a Popular Movement (Union pour un mouvement populaire or UMP), and was its first president from 2002 to 2004.

As a member of the National Assembly (as representative of Paris from 1986 to 1997, then representative of Gironde), he was elected Mayor of Bordeaux in 1995, succeeding former Prime Minister Jacques Chaban-Delmas.

=== Criminal conviction (1999–2006) ===
In 2004, Alain Juppé was tried for the felony of abuse of public funds, when he was head of the RPR and the RPR illegally used personnel provided by the City of Paris for running its operations. He was convicted and sentenced to an 18-month suspended jail sentence, the deprivation of civic rights for five years, and the deprivation of the right to run for political office for 10 years. He appealed the decision, whereupon his disqualification from holding elected office was reduced to one year and the suspended sentence cut to 14 months. He announced he would not appeal the ruling before the Court of Cassation. (See Corruption scandals in the Paris region.)

As a consequence, Alain Juppé resigned his mayoralty of Bordeaux and his position of head of the Bordeaux urban community.

The court commented:

It is regrettable that at the time when the legislative body became aware of the need to end criminal practices which existed for the financing of political parties, Mr Juppé did not apply to his own party the very rules that he had voted for in Parliament.

It is equally regrettable that Mr Juppé, whose intellectual qualities are unanimously recognized, did not judge appropriate to assume before Justice his entire criminal responsibility and kept on denying established facts.

However, Mr Juppé has given himself for many years to the service of the State, while he did obtain no personal enrichment from these crimes he committed for the benefit of his political party, for which he should not be a scapegoat.

Some commentators, such as Jean-Marc Ayrault, head of the National Assembly group of the Socialist Party, have argued that Juppé, in this judicial group, paid for a wider responsibility than his own.

Some law professors argued that the Versailles court could not legally exempt Juppé from a disposition of the Electoral Code article L7, which bars any person sentenced for illegal taking of interests from being on an electoral roll for a period of 5 years, also preventing that person from running for office. Another disposition of the Electoral Code specifies that any person deprived of the right to be on an electoral roll for a certain period following a judicial sentence is deprived of the right of running for the French National Assembly for double that period, which would bar Juppé for 10 years. When Alain Juppé registered again as a voter, other voters sued to have his registration cancelled; however, the Bordeaux court of small claims ruled against them. Some of the plaintiffs declared they would appeal the decision before the Court of Cassation. Another possible issue is that should Alain Juppé be elected to national office, the Constitutional Council could cancel the election on grounds that Juppé was illegally registered as a voter. President Jacques Chirac could have used his right of pardon in favor of Juppé, but this would have probably been politically disastrous.

Juppé considered giving classes on public administration at a variety of prominent United States and Quebec universities and colleges, including the UQÀM in Montreal, some of which were initially receptive to having a former prime minister be a member of their faculty. However, following Juppé's conviction, his appointment was contested by some teachers. Juppé was finally taken in by the École nationale d'administration publique in Montreal where he served as a full-time faculty member for the academic year 2005–2006.

=== Return to public life (2006–2010) ===
Juppé was reelected as Mayor of Bordeaux in October 2006.

In May 2007, he was appointed Minister of State, Minister of Ecology and Sustainable Development in the Government of François Fillon, being in fact the number two of the Government in protocolar order. This is the third time in the history of Fifth Republic (after Michel Debré and Laurent Fabius) that a former Prime Minister returned as a Minister in another government (although some Presidents of the Council of the Fourth Republic were Ministers of the Fifth Republic).

Juppé ran unsuccessfully in the 2007 legislative elections, and as a consequence announced his resignation from the government. Prime Minister Fillon had announced that all ministers that chose to run in these elections and were beaten would have to leave the government, for it meant that these ministers did not enjoy the confidence of the people.

On 9 March 2008, Juppé was reelected as Mayor of Bordeaux, winning 56% of the popular vote in the first round.

=== Back in government (2010–2012) ===
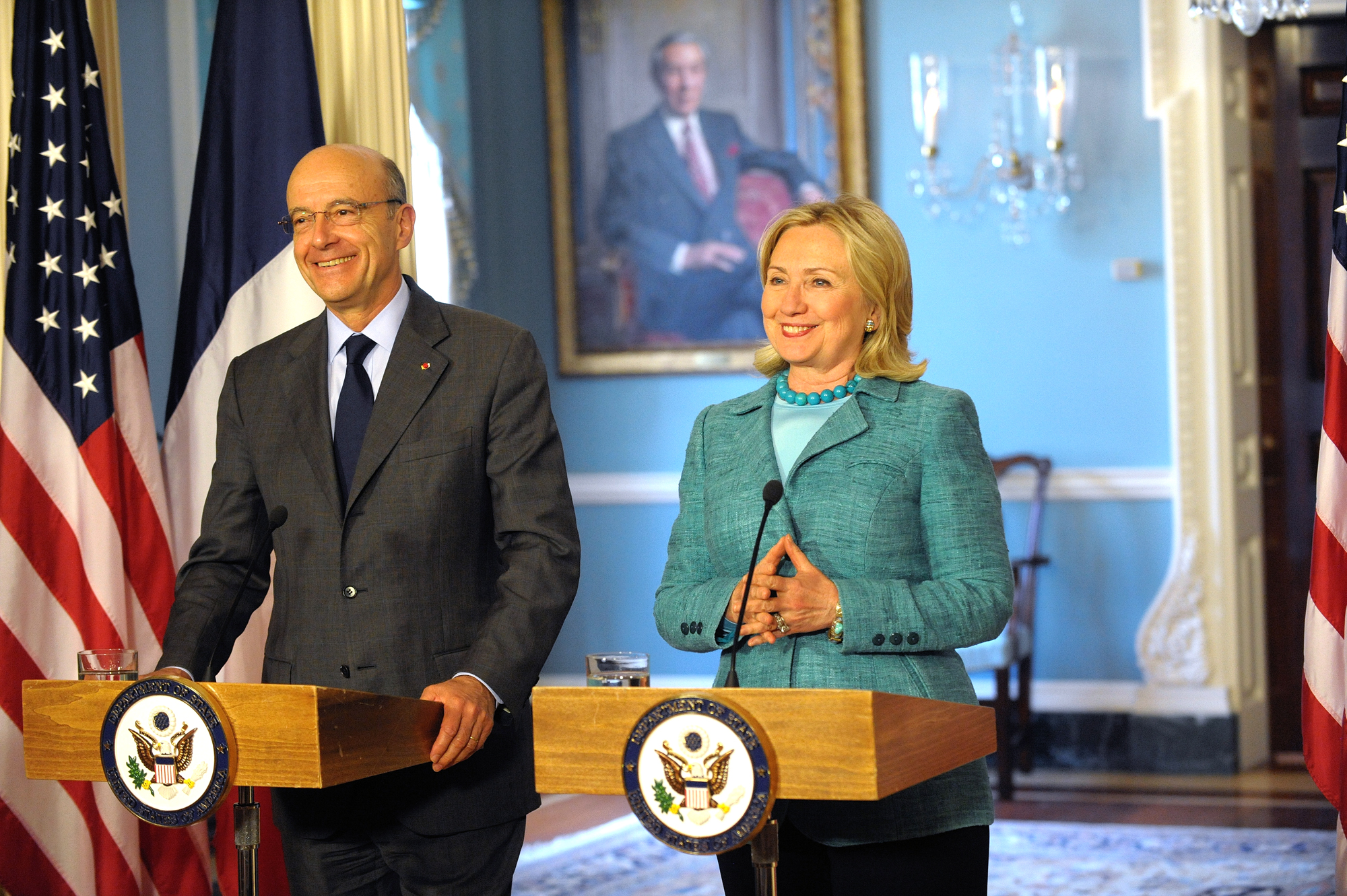
Juppé meets with U.S. Secretary of State Hillary Clinton in Washington, D.C., 6 June 2011

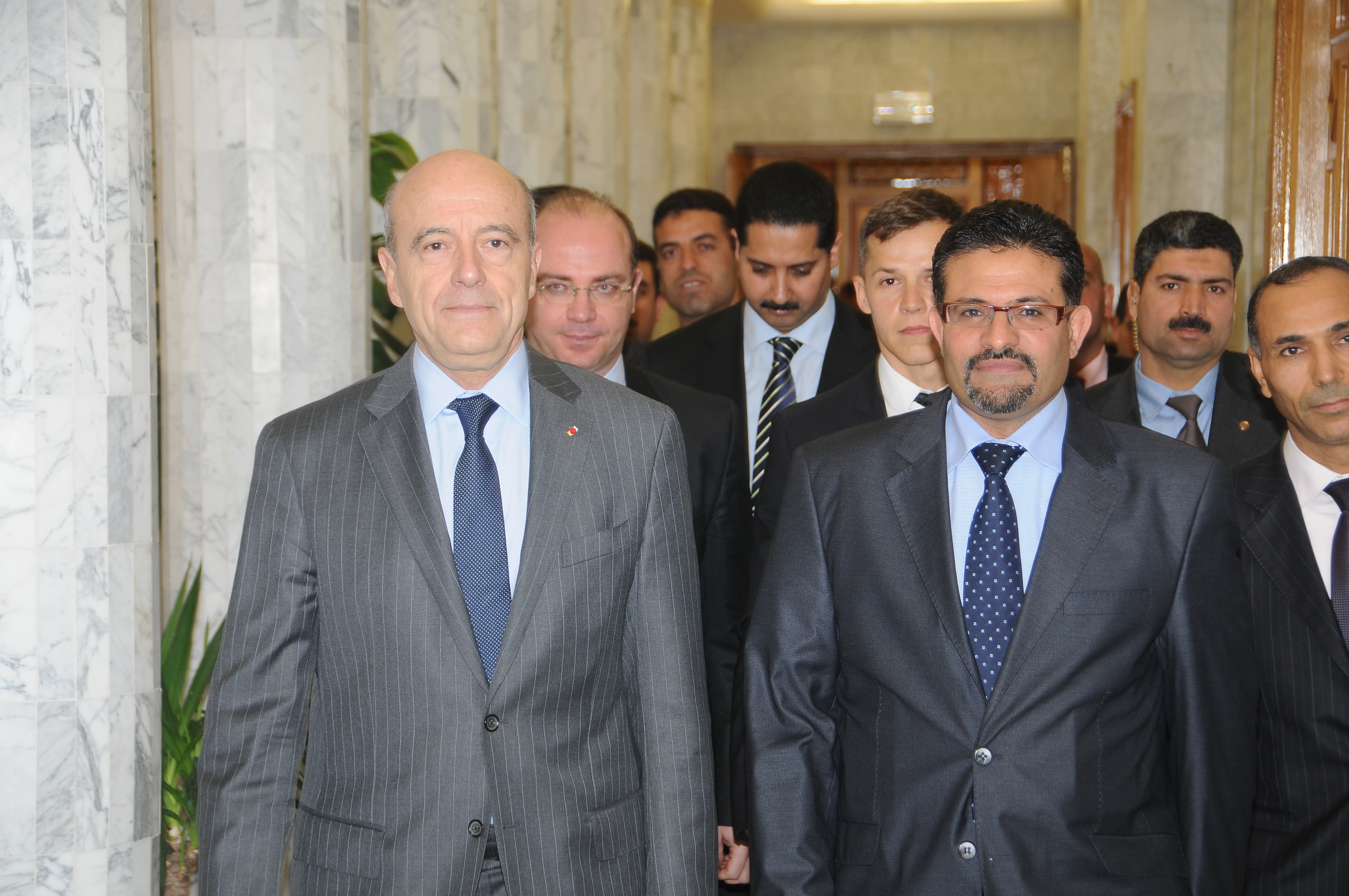
French and Tunisian Foreign ministers Alain Juppé and Rafik Abdessalem at Tunis on 5 January 2012

In 2010, after the disappointed result of the regional elections of the ruling UMP, Nicolas Sarkozy called Alain Juppé to come back in government. Juppé refused the Justice Ministry and Interior Ministry. He accepted to be Minister of Defense.

In 2011, after the resignation of Michèle Alliot-Marie, Juppé was appointed Foreign Minister. This came while the Arab Spring was underway. He advocated a military intervention in Libya with the support of most of the mediatic and political class. In November 2011, he told that the Syrian regime would fall soon and that Bashar al-Assad should be judged by the International Penal court. Later, this attitude has been condemned or badly evaluated by experts or politicians, estimating that the destabilization of nation-states has permitted the extension of Islamic extremism, but Juppé has maintained his positions.

Endorsing Nicolas Sarkozy for the 2012 presidential election, he deplored the role of biased media in the campaign and dismissed François Hollande's economic program as "dangerous". Considering the weak score of Sarkozy in his Gironde's 2nd constituency, he renounced to be candidate at the June 2012 legislative elections. His successor, Nicolas Florian, was beaten by Socialist candidate Michèle Delaunay.

=== Presidential ambition (2012–2016) ===
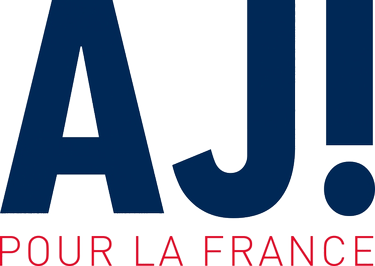
Alain Juppé logo in 2016 presidential primary

After the 2012 defeat, Juppé stayed far from the troubled period of his party. In March 2014, he was triumphantly re-elected as mayor of Bordeaux. Two months later, following the resignation of Jean-François Copé from the head of the UMP, it was announced that former Prime Ministers Alain Juppé, François Fillon and Jean-Pierre Raffarin would rule the party until a new leadership election in October. They resigned after the designation of Nicolas Sarkozy.

Juppé announced his intention to contest the 2016 Republicans (formerly UMP) internal election which decided who would be the candidate of the right-wing for the 2017 presidential election. One of the most popular politicians in France, he was described by The Daily Telegraph as "a consensual conservative seen as less divisive than Nicolas Sarkozy". His main rival was thought to be Nicolas Sarkozy who chose to run on a hard line to thwart Juppé's centrist line. Indeed, Juppé advocated a "happy identity" in response to the French philosopher Alain Finkielkraut whose last book was entitled The unhappy identity. He was endorsed by former President Jacques Chirac and his daughter Claude, by MoDem leader François Bayrou and by centrist parties such as the Radical Party or the UDI. Surveys showed that he would benefit from the support of left-wing voters.

His record as mayor of Bordeaux was often seen as one of his strengths in the primary. However, his judicial conviction and his record as prime minister of France attracted criticism, as well as his positions on immigration and Islam, mainly in the right wing of his party. Some detractors have dubbed him "Ali Juppé".

Juppé came in second place in the first Republican presidential primary on 20 November 2016 and went into a run-off against the first-placed François Fillon on 27 November. He received 28.6% of the vote compared to 44.1% for François Fillon. One week later, he lost to Fillon with 33.5% and officially supported his rival. This result was viewed as a shock as Juppé had been the consistent front-runner in the polls.

=== Constitutional Council (2019) ===
On 13 February 2019, it was announced that Juppé would take over Lionel Jospin's seat on the Conseil Constitutionnel in March 2019, which entailed his resignation as mayor of Bordeaux and president of its metropolitan area. At the press conference organized the following day, the former prime minister lamented an "unhealthy public spirit" and the physical and verbal violence of the political environment.

== Political positions ==
=== Social issues ===
In March 2009, he criticized Pope Benedict XVI over his comments that condoms will only worsen the AIDS crisis, saying that as a Christian, he felt that such declarations were totally unacceptable. He was also awarded on behalf of Armenia the Mesrob Mashdots Medal for his service in strengthening and deepening the cooperation between the governments of Armenia and France.

=== European Union ===
Juppé's position on Europe has changed through years. In 1977, as a national delegate of the neo-Gaullist RPR, he advocated a "Europe of the peoples" against a "Europe of technocrats", opposing the confederal model to the federal model.

But fifteen years later, he convinced Jacques Chirac to agree to the Maastricht Treaty, while the party was strongly divided on the subject. He then said that the treaty was "common sense" and that the Euro is "a strategy for growth". In 2000, he co-signed a tribune in Le Figaro with Jacques Toubon asking for a European constitution to create a federal Europe. In 2011, he seemed to regret his positions, declaring at the National Assembly "If the Maastricht Treaty had been better built, we would probably not be where we are now". But the same year, interviewed on the public television channel France 2, Juppé strongly advocated for the creation of a European federation to respond to the euro crisis.

During the Greek debt crisis in 2015, he proposed to take out Greece of the Eurozone but then changed his mind. Reacting to the Brexit vote in 2016, he refused the idea of a similar referendum in France, thinking it would be "a present to Madame Le Pen".

=== Immigration and Islam ===
In 1977, he proposed granting preferential status for jobs to French citizens. In 1990, he judged that immigration was "a permanent and huge" problem. The same year, the general meeting of the RPR led to strict propositions : borders closing, suspension of immigration, and declarations of the incompatibility between Islam and French laws.

His position changed in the late 1990s. He supported a MEDEF report asking for more immigration on the labour market. In 2002, he said "the French peoples have perfectly understood that we need to welcome more foreigners in Europe and in France". He has also denied the effectiveness of a cultural assimilation of migrants and advocates a simple integration, wanting to "happy identity". His positions are harshly criticized by the right-wing part of his party and by the National Front. Nicolas Sarkozy have mocked him as a naïve idealist and a "prophet of happiness".

On 16 December 2010, he said in an interview with Le Monde that he does not support the French ban on face covering to not "stigmatize Islam". Hosted on France 2 by journalist David Pujadas on 2 October 2014, he denied having said that. In a 2011 Le Parisien interview, talking about the Arab Spring, he declared: "Do not stigmatize all those who call themselves islamists, there are people attached to Islam and ready to accept the basic laws of democracy".

In October 2016 during a speech he urged overhaul of Le Touquet Agreement calling for the UK border to be moved from Calais to Kent.

== List of offices ==
Governmental functions

Prime Minister: 1995–1997.

Minister of Budget and government spokesman: 1986–1988.

Minister of Foreign Affairs: 1993–1995.

Minister of Ecology, Development and Sustainable Planning: May–June 2007.

Minister of State, Minister of Defense and Veterans Affairs: 2010–2011.

Minister of State, minister of Foreign and European Affairs: 2011–2012.

Electoral mandates

European Parliament

Member of European Parliament: 1984–1986 (Became minister in 1986) / June–October 1989 (Resignation).

National Assembly of France

Member of the National Assembly of France for Paris (18th constituency): Elected in March 1986 (Became minister in March 1986) / 1988–1993 (Became minister in 1993). Elected in 1986, reelected in 1988, 1993.

Member of the National Assembly of France for Gironde (2nd constituency): 1997–2004 (Resignation, involved in judicial affairs in 2004). Reelected in 2002.

Regional Council

Regional councillor of Île-de-France: March–April 1992 (Resignation).

Municipal Council

Mayor of Bordeaux: 1995–2004 (Resignation, involved in judicial affairs in 2004) / Since 2006. Reelected in 2001, 2006, 2008, 2014.

Municipal councillor of Bordeaux: 1995–2004 (Resignation, involved in judicial affairs in 2004) / Since 2006. Reelected in 2001, 2006, 2008.

Deputy-mayor of Paris XVIIIe: 1983–1995. Reelected in 1989.

Councillor of Paris: 1983–1995. Reelected in 1989.

Urban community Council

President of the Urban Community of Bordeaux: 1995–2004 (Resignation, involved in judicial affairs in 2004) / Since 2014. Reelected in 2001, 2014.

Vice-president of the Urban Community of Bordeaux: 2006–2014. Reelected in 2008.

Member of the Urban Community of Bordeaux: 1995–2004 (Resignation, involved in judicial affairs in 2004) / Since 2006. Reelected in 2001, 2006, 2008, 2014.

Political functions

President of the Rally for the Republic: 1994–1997.

President of the Union for a Popular Movement: 2002–2004 (Involved in judicial affairs in 2004).

== Composition of Juppé ministries ==
=== Juppé's first cabinet, 17 May – 7 November 1995 ===
- Alain Juppé – Prime Minister
- Hervé de Charette – Minister of Foreign Affairs
- Charles Millon – Minister of Defense
- Jean-Louis Debré – Minister of the Interior
- Alain Madelin – Minister of the Economy and Finance
- Jacques Toubon – Minister of Justice
- Yves Galland – Minister of Industry
- François Bayrou – Minister of National Education, Vocational Training, Higher Education and Research
- Jacques Barrot – Minister of Labour, Social Dialogue and Participation
- Pierre Pasquini – Minister of Veterans and War Victims
- Philippe Douste-Blazy – Minister of Culture
- Philippe Vasseur – Minister of Agriculture, Fisheries and Food
- Corinne Lepage – Minister of the Environment
- Jean-Jacques de Peretti – Minister of Overseas
- Bernard Pons – Minister of Transport, Regional Planning and Equipment
- Roger Romani – Minister of Relations with Parliament
- Elisabeth Hubert – Minister of Public Health and Sickness Insurance
- Pierre-André Périssol – Minister of Housing
- Françoise de Panafieu – Minister of Tourism
- François Fillon – Minister of Information Technologies and Post
- Jean Puech – Minister of Civil Service
- Jean-Pierre Raffarin – Minister of Small and Medium-sized Companies, Commerce and Craft Industry
- Claude Goasguen – Minister of Reform of the State, Decentralisation and Citizenship
- Colette Codaccioni – Minister of Solidarity between Generations
- Eric Raoult – Minister of Integration and Fight against Exclusion
- Jean Arthuis – Minister of Planning

Changes

- 25 August 1995 – Jean Arthuis succeeds Madelin as Minister of Economy and Finance, remaining also Minister of Planning.

=== Juppé's second cabinet, 7 November 1995 – 2 June 1997 ===
- Alain Juppé – Prime Minister
- Hervé de Charette – Minister of Foreign Affairs
- Charles Millon – Minister of Defense
- Jean-Louis Debré – Minister of the Interior
- Jean Arthuis – Minister of the Economy and Finance
- Jacques Toubon – Minister of Justice
- Franck Borotra – Minister of Industry, Posts and Telecommunications
- François Bayrou – Minister of National Education, Vocational Training, Higher Education and Research
- Jacques Barrot – Minister of Labour and Social Affairs
- Philippe Douste-Blazy – Minister of Culture
- Philippe Vasseur – Minister of Agriculture, Fisheries and Food
- Guy Drut – Minister of Youth and Sport
- Corinne Lepage – Minister of Environment
- Bernard Pons – Minister of Transport, Housing, Tourism and Equipment
- Roger Romani – Minister of Relations with Parliament
- Dominique Perben – Minister of Civil Service, Reform of the State and Decentralisation
- Jean-Claude Gaudin – Minister of City and Regional Planning
- Jean-Pierre Raffarin – Minister of Small and Medium-sized Companies, Commerce and Craft Industry

== Books ==
- La Tentation de Venise, Grasset, 1993. ISBN 224646241X.
- Entre nous, NiL, 1996. ISBN 2841110729
- Montesquieu, Perrin-Grasset, 1999.
- Entre quatre z'yeux, with Serge July, Grasset, 2001. ISBN 9782246570219
- France, mon pays : lettres d'un voyageur, with Isabelle Juppé, Laffont, 2006. ISBN 9782221103654
- Je ne mangerai plus de cerises en hiver, Plon, 2009. ISBN 9782259203333
- La Politique, telle qu'elle meurt de ne pas être, with Michel Rocard, J.-C. Lattès, 2010. ISBN 9782709635776
- Mes chemins pour l’école, J.-C. Lattès, 2015. ISBN 978-2-7096-5046-5
- Pour un État fort, Paris, J.-C. Lattès, 2016.
- De vous à moi, 2016.
- »5 ans pour l’emploi », JC Lattès, 2016.

== Videos ==
- L'entrée de la Turquie dans l'Union européenne : la perception de l'opinion publique européenne Video conference of Alain Juppé about the Turkish question, given in Montreal in March 2006, Center of international research University of Montreal
- La France, trois mois avant les présidentielles Conference given in Montreal in January 2007, Centro de estudios internacionales de la Universidad de Montreal

Political offices
Preceded by Henri Emmanuelli	Delegate Minister for Budget; 1986–1988	Succeeded by Pierre Bérégovoy
Preceded by Roland Dumas	Minister of Foreign Affairs; 1993–1995	Succeeded by Hervé de Charette
Preceded by Édouard Balladur	Prime Minister of France; 1995–1997	Succeeded by Lionel Jospin
Preceded by Jacques Chaban-Delmas	Mayor of Bordeaux; 1995–2004; 2006–2019	Succeeded by Hugues Martin
Preceded by Hugues Martin	Mayor of Bordeaux; 1995–2004; 2006–2019	Succeeded by Nicolas Florian
Preceded by Nelly Olin	Minister of Ecology and Sustainable Development; 2007	Succeeded by Jean-Louis Borloo
Preceded by Hervé Morin	Minister of Defence and Veterans Affairs; 2010–2011	Succeeded by Gérard Longuet
Preceded by Michèle Alliot-Marie	Minister of Foreign and European Affairs; 2011–2012	Succeeded by Laurent Fabius
Party political offices
Preceded by Jacques Chirac	President of Rally for the Republic; 1994–1997	Succeeded by Philippe Séguin
New office	President of Union for a Popular Movement; 2002–2004	Succeeded by Jean-Claude Gaudin; Acting
Legal offices
Preceded by Lionel Jospin	Member of the Constitutional Council; 2019–present	Incumbent
Order of precedence
Preceded by Édith Cresson as former Prime Minister	Order of precedence of France; Former Prime Minister	Succeeded by Jean-Pierre Raffarin as former Prime Minister
