= Gironde's 4th constituency =

Constituency of the National Assembly of France

4th constituency of Gironde
- inline Constituency of the National Assembly of France

- Location of constituency in Department

- Location of Gironde in France
- Deputy: Alain David; PS
- Department: Gironde
- Cantons: (pre-2015) Carbon-Blanc, Cenon, Floirac, Lormont.

The 4th constituency of the Gironde (French: Quatrième circonscription de la Gironde) is a French legislative constituency in Gironde département. Like the other 576 French constituencies, it elects one MP using the two-round system, with a run-off if no candidate receives over 50% of the vote in the first round.

== Historic representation ==
Election	Member	Party
1958	René Cassagne	SFIO
1962	René Cassagne	SFIO
1967	René Cassagne	SFIO
1968	Philippe Madrelle	SFIO
1973	Philippe Madrelle	PS
1978	Philippe Madrelle	PS
1980	Pierre Garmendia	PS
1981	Pierre Garmendia	PS
1986	Proportional representation - no election by constituency	
1988	Pierre Garmendia	PS
1993	Pierre Garmendia	PS
1997	Conchita Lacuey	PS
2002	Conchita Lacuey	PS
2007	Conchita Lacuey	PS
2012	Conchita Lacuey	PS
2017	Alain David	PS
2022	Alain David	PS
2024	Alain David	PS

== Election results ==
=== 2024 ===
Candidate	Party	Alliance	First round			Second round		
Candidate	Party	Alliance	Votes	%	+/–	Votes	%	+/–
Alain David	PS	NFP	27,092	42.36	+1.81	37,141	61.48	+1.75
Julie Rechagneux	RN		20,702	32.37	+11.23	23,266	38.52	new
Fabrice Moretti	MoDEM	Ensemble	11,045	17.27	-6.73			
Jérôme Lambert	LR	UDC	4,387	6.86	new			
Anne-Isabelle Brivary	LO		734	1.15	+0.16			
Votes			63,960	100.00		60,407	100.00	
Valid votes			63,960	97.54	-0.55	60,407	93.16	+0.80
Blank votes			1,081	1.65	+0.25	3,406	5.25	+0.12
Null votes			532	0.81	+0.30	1,028	1.59	-0.92
Turnout			65,573	65.73	+20.71	64,841	64.98	+22.87
Abstentions			34,194	34.27	-20.71	34,948	35.02	-22.87
Registered voters			99,767			99,789		
Result			PS HOLD					

=== 2022 ===
Legislative Election 2022: Gironde's 4th constituency
Party	Candidate	Votes	%	±%
PS (NUPÉS)	Alain David	17,628	40.55	+3.23
LREM (Ensemble)	Melissa Karaca	10,431	24.00	-7.59
RN	Julie Rechagneux	9,191	21.14	+8.04
REC	Philippe Garnier	1,679	3.86	N/A
LC (UDC)	Jean Patrice Fillang	1,561	3.59	−9.51
Others	N/A	2,978		
Turnout		43,468	45.02	−0.77
2nd round result
PS (NUPÉS)	Alain David	22,876	59.73	+8.82
LREM (Ensemble)	Melissa Karaca	15,426	40.27	−8.82
Turnout		38,302	42.11	+4.76
PS hold				

=== 2017 ===
Candidate	Label	First round		Second round	
Candidate	Label	Votes	%	Votes	%
Aziz S'Kalli-Bouaziza	REM	13,276	31.59	14,992	49.09
Alain David	PS	6,857	16.31	15,550	50.91
Maud Besson	FI	6,103	14.52		
Serge Hadon	FN	5,506	13.10		
Hubert Laporte	UDI	5,506	13.10		
Laure Desvalois	ECO	1,791	4.26		
Berivan Bal	PCF	936	2.23		
Martine Hostier	DLF	672	1.60		
Daphné Daumand	DIV	537	1.28		
Jean-Louis Gilles	DIV	326	0.78		
Anne-Isabelle Brivary	EXG	287	0.68		
Christine Héraud	EXG	233	0.55		
Votes		42,030	100.00	30,542	100.00
Valid votes		42,030	98.03	30,542	87.33
Blank votes		589	1.37	3,003	8.59
Null votes		254	0.59	1,429	4.09
Turnout		42,873	45.79	34,974	37.35
Abstentions		50,757	54.21	58,657	62.65
Registered voters		93,630		93,631	
Source: Ministry of the Interior

=== 2012 ===
2012 legislative election in Gironde's 4th constituency
Candidate	Party	First round		Second round	
Candidate	Party	Votes	%	Votes	%
Conchita Lacuey	PS	23,072	49.78%	27,472	67.23%
Anne-Lise Jacquet		8,806	19.00%	13,391	32.77%
Philippe Baconnet	FN	7,307	15.77%		
Alexandra Meynard	FG	3,645	7.87%		
Paula Knibbs	EELV	1,759	3.80%		
Monique Bluge	PR	587	1.27%		
Christine Heraud	NPA	437	0.94%		
Michel Rittling	AEI	408	0.88%		
Anne-Isabelle Brivary	LO	323	0.70%		
Valid votes		46,344	98.39%	40,863	95.66%
Spoilt and null votes		756	1.61%	1,854	4.34%
Votes cast / turnout		47,100	54.31%	42,717	49.25%
Abstentions		39,620	45.69%	44,022	50.75%
Registered voters		86,720	100.00%	86,739	100.00%

=== 2007 ===
Legislative Election 2007: Gironde's 4th constituency
Party	Candidate	Votes	%	±%
PS	Conchita Lacuey	19,649	40.51	
UMP	Nathalie Delattre	14,925	30.77	
MoDem	Anne-Lise Jacquet	3,728	7.69	
PCF	Max Guichard	1,989	4.10	
FN	Dominique Renucci	1,889	3.89	
Far left	Christine Heraud	1,362	2.81	
LV	Marie-Christine Boutheau	1,213	2.50	
Others	N/A	3,752		
Turnout		49,223	59.48	
2nd round result
PS	Conchita Lacuey	27,840	59.50	
UMP	Nathalie Delattre	18,948	40.50	
Turnout		48,179	58.22	
PS hold				

=== 2002 ===
Legislative Election 2002: Gironde's 4th constituency
Party	Candidate	Votes	%	±%
PS	Conchita Lacuey	19,558	40.29	
UMP	Hugues Martin	13,526	27.86	
FN	Dominique Renucci	5,451	11.23	
PCF	Josiane Maestro	2,294	4.73	
LV	Marie-Christine Boutheau	1,800	3.71	
CPNT	Eddie Puyjalon	1,514	3.12	
Others	N/A	4,400		
Turnout		49,610	64.42	
2nd round result
PS	Conchita Lacuey	24,942	59.29	
UMP	Hugues Martin	17,129	40.71	
Turnout		44,126	57.30	
PS hold				

=== 1997 ===
Legislative Election 1997: Gironde's 4th constituency
Party	Candidate	Votes	%	±%
PS	Conchita Lacuey	12,588	25.84	
RPR	Jean-Pierre Favroul	9,213	18.91	
PS	Jean-Pierre Soubie*	7,485	15.37	
FN	Michel Munier	7,200	14.78	
PCF	Didier Iglesias	5,106	10.48	
LO	Aline Barthélémy	1,215	2.49	
DVD	Renaud Gabaude	1,202	2.47	
LV	Pascal Scazza	1,123	2.31	
GE	Gilles Fernandez	1,036	2.13	
Others	N/A	2,540		
Turnout		50,843	70.00	
2nd round result
PS	Conchita Lacuey	30,715	63.71	
RPR	Jean-Pierre Favroul	17,498	36.29	
Turnout		51,985	71.57	
PS hold				

* PS dissident

== Sources ==
- French Interior Ministry results website: "Résultats électoraux officiels en France" (in French).
