= Catherine Fabre =

French politician (born 1978)

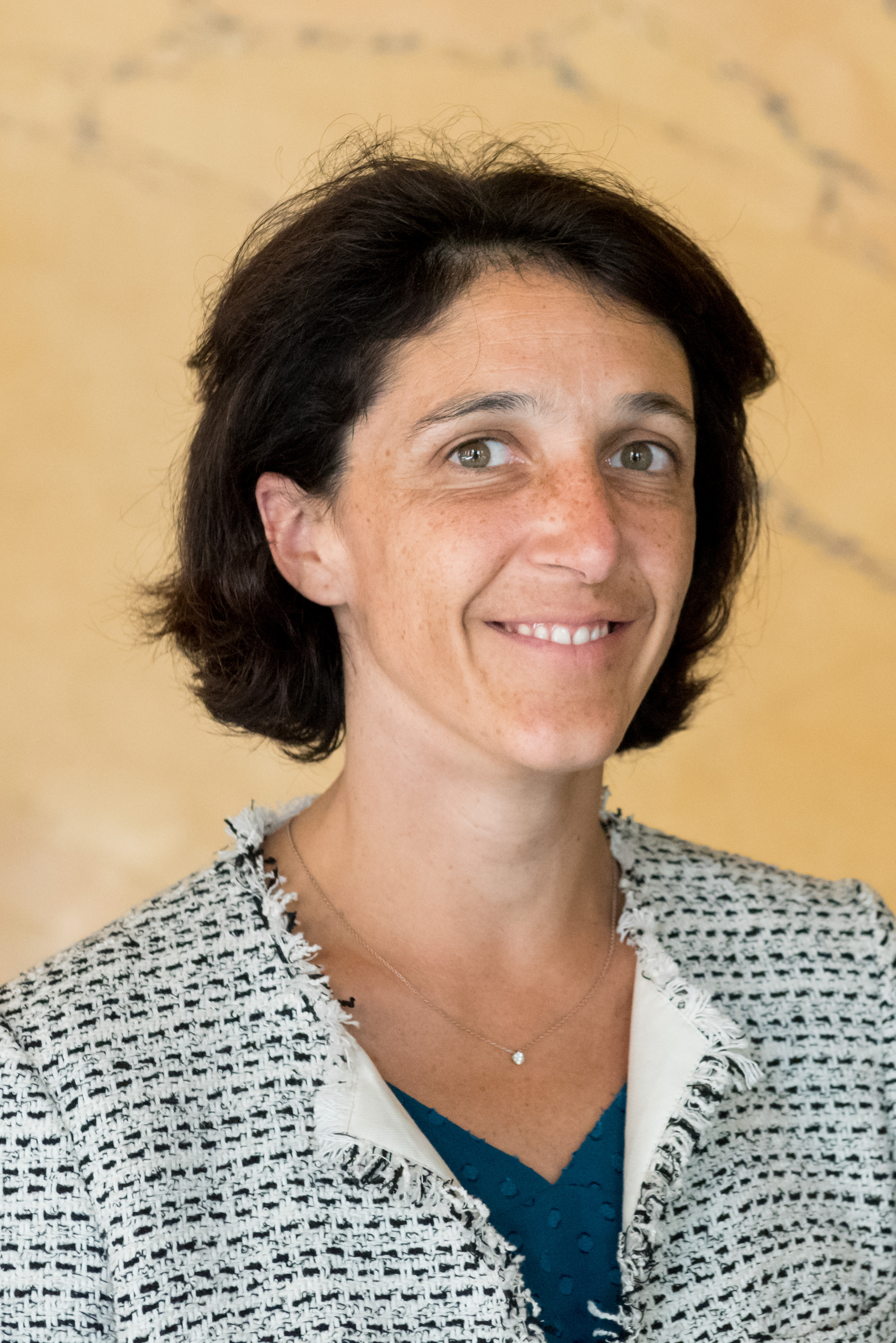

Member of the National Assembly for Gironde's 2nd constituency
- In office 21 June 2017 – 22 June 2022
- Preceded by: Michèle Delaunay
- Succeeded by: Nicolas Thierry

Personal details
- Born: 19 September 1978 (age 48) Toulouse, France
- Party: La République En Marche!
- Education: École normale supérieure de Cachan
- Profession: Lecturer

Catherine Fabre (French pronunciation: [katʁin fabʁ]; born 19 September 1978) is a French politician of La République En Marche! (LREM) who served as a member of the French National Assembly since the 2017 elections, representing the 2nd constituency of the department of Gironde.

== Political career ==
In Parliament, Fabre serves as member of the Committee on Social Affairs. In this capacity, she has been her parliamentary group's rapporteur on pensions reform since 2019.

In addition to her committee assignments, Fabre is part of the parliamentary friendship groups with Cambodia and Sweden.

In 2020, Fabre joined En commun (EC), a group within LREM led by Barbara Pompili.

In the 2022 French legislative election she was unseated in the second round.

== Political positions ==
In July 2019, Fabre voted in favour of the French ratification of the European Union’s Comprehensive Economic and Trade Agreement (CETA) with Canada.
