= Conchita Lacuey =

French politician

Member of the National Assembly for Gironde's 4th constituency
- In office 12 June 1997 – 20 June 2017
- Preceded by: Pierre Garmendia
- Succeeded by: Alain David
- Parliamentary group: SOC (1997-2007); SRC (2007-2016); SER (2016-2017)

Mayor of Floirac
- In office 18 March 2001 – 18 February 2013
- Preceded by: Pierre Garmendia
- Succeeded by: Jean-Jacques Puyobrau

Personal details
- Born: 30 September 1943 (age 82) Bordeaux, France
- Party: Socialist Party

Conchita Lacuey (born 30 September 1943) is a French politician. A former member of the National Assembly of France, she represented Gironde's 4th constituency as a member of the Socialist Party.

== Biography ==
Conchita Lacuey was born on 30 September 1943 in Bordeaux, France to exiled Spanish parents. Her father, a cabinetmaker by profession, was a leader of the Spanish Socialist Workers' Party (PSOE).

First elected Deputy of Gironde's 4th constituency on 1 June 1997, she was re-elected on 18 June 2002, 17 June 2007, and 17 June 2012. She was a member of the Socialist Group in the National Assembly.

She supported Martine Aubry during the 2011 French Socialist Party presidential primary.

In 2013, she resigned from her mandate as Mayor and announced she'd continue to sit on the municipal council of the commune. Her former deputy mayor, Jean-Jacques Puyobrau was elected mayor on 18 February 2013. She decided not to re-present herself during the 2017 French legislative election, leaving the field empty for Alain David of the Socialist Party and mayor of the neighbouring commune of Cenon.

=== Family ===
Her daughter, Nathalie Lacuey, is currently a deputy mayor of Floirac and departmental councillor for the Canton of Cenon.

== Summary of mandates ==
=== Municipal council and Mayor ===
- 1 April 1980 — 6 March 1983: Municipal councillor of Floirac.
- 6 March 1983 — 18 March 2001: Deputy mayor of Floirac.
- 18 March 2001 — 18 February 2013: Mayor of Floirac.
- Since 18 February 2013: Deputy mayor of Floirac.

=== Deputy ===
Deputy of Gironde's 4th constituency:

- From 1 June 1997 to 18 June 2002.
- From 19 June 2002 to 19 June 2007.
- From 20 June 2007 to 20 June 2012.
- From 20 June 2012 to 20 June 2017.

=== Candidacy ===
Legislative elections:

- 1997 — Victory during the 2nd round with 63.71% of the vote.
- 2002 — Victory during the 2nd round with 59.29% of the vote.
- 2007 — Victory during the 2nd round with 59.50% of the vote.
- 2012 — Victory during the 2nd round with 67.23% of the vote.
