= Gironde's 2nd constituency =

Constituency of the National Assembly of France

2nd constituency of Gironde
- inline Constituency of the National Assembly of France

- Location of constituency in Department

- Location of Gironde in France
- Deputy: Nicolas Thierry; EELV
- Department: Gironde
- Cantons: (pre-2015) Bordeaux-3, Bordeaux-4, Bordeaux-5, Bordeaux-7.

The 2nd constituency of the Gironde (French: Deuxième circonscription de la Gironde) is a French legislative constituency in Gironde département. Like the other 576 French constituencies, it elects one MP using the two-round system, with a run-off if no candidate receives over 50% of the vote in the first round.

Election	Member	Party	Notes
1958	Jacques Chaban-Delmas	UNR	
1962	Jacques Chaban-Delmas	UNR	
1967	Jacques Chaban-Delmas	UDR	
1968	Jacques Chaban-Delmas	UDR	Appointed Prime Minister
1969	Jacques Chabrat	UDR	Substitute for Chaban-Delmas
1970	Jacques Valade	UDR	By-election winner
1973	Jacques Chaban-Delmas	UDR	
1978	Jacques Chaban-Delmas	RPR	
1981	Jacques Chaban-Delmas	RPR	
1986	Proportional representation - no election by constituency		
1988	Jacques Chaban-Delmas	RPR	
1993	Jacques Chaban-Delmas	RPR	
1997	Alain Juppé	RPR	
2002	Alain Juppé	UMP	Resigned
2004	Hugues Martin	UMP	Won by-election on 21 November 2004
2007	Michèle Delaunay	PS	
2012	Michèle Delaunay	PS	
2017	Catherine Fabre	LREM	
2022	Nicolas Thierry	EELV	
2024	Nicolas Thierry	LE	

== Election results ==
=== 2024 ===
Candidate	Party	Alliance	First round			Second round		
Candidate	Party	Alliance	Votes	%	+/–	Votes	%	+/–
Nicolas Thierry	LE	NFP	26,547	49.45	+4.33	27,920	59.01	+5.67
Véronique Juramy	REN	Ensemble	15,610	29.08	-3.75	19,391	40.99	-5.67
Flavie Fournier	RN		7,510	13.99	+8.78			
Christine Errera	LR	UDC	3,692	6.88	-0.53			
Guy Dupont	LO		307	0.57	-0.31			
Yanis Iva	EXD		20	0.04	new			
David Pijoan	NPA		0	0.00	new			
Votes			53,686	100.00		47,311	100.00	
Valid votes			53,686	98.67	-0.01	47,311	93.76	-2.55
Blank votes			529	0.97	-0.06	2,317	4.59	+1.94
Null votes			197	0.36	+0.06	832	1.65	+0.61
Turnout			54,412	73.38	+20.40	50,460	68.05	+15.73
Abstentions			19,735		-20.40	23,693	31.95	-15.73
Registered voters			74,146			74,153		
Result			LE HOLD					

=== 2022 ===
Legislative Election 2022: Gironde's 2nd constituency
Party	Candidate	Votes	%	±%
EELV (NUPÉS)	Nicolas Thierry	17,054	45.12	+11.21
LREM (Ensemble)	Catherine Fabre	12,407	32.83	-6.95
LR (UDC)	Emmanuelle Cuny	2,799	7.41	−8.38
RN	Pierre Le Camus	1,970	5.21	+1.45
REC	Virginie Tournay	1,879	4.97	N/A
Others	N/A	1,685		
Turnout		37,794	52.98	+1.90
2nd round result
EELV (NUPÉS)	Nicolas Thierry	19,433	53.34	N/A
LREM (Ensemble)	Catherine Fabre	16,997	46.66	−17.13
Turnout		36,430	52.32	+14.22
EELV gain from LREM				

=== 2017 ===
Candidate	Label	First round		Second round	
Candidate	Label	Votes	%	Votes	%
Catherine Fabre	REM	13,284	39.78	13,874	63.79
Anne Walryck	LR	5,274	15.79	7,875	36.21
Aude Darchy	FI	4,436	13.28		
Michèle Delaunay	PS	3,569	10.69		
Pierre Hurmic	ECO	2,684	8.04		
Julie Rechagneux	FN	1,254	3.76		
Servane Crussière	PCF	635	1.90		
Guillaume Boraud	DVD	406	1.22		
Alexis Azoulai	DVG	372	1.11		
Laurence Couteille	ECO	345	1.03		
Hélène Thouy	DIV	319	0.96		
Christophe Bugeau	DLF	248	0.74		
Jean-Pierre Etchoimborde	DIV	191	0.57		
Guy Dupont	EXG	130	0.39		
Alexandre Mahfoudhi	EXG	90	0.27		
Farid Azzoug	EXG	65	0.19		
Stéphane Boudy	DVG	50	0.15		
Daniel Menuet	DIV	40	0.12		
Votes		33,392	100.00	21,749	100.00
Valid votes		33,392	99.05	21,749	86.50
Blank votes		207	0.61	2,576	10.25
Null votes		113	0.34	818	3.25
Turnout		33,712	51.08	25,143	38.10
Abstentions		32,283	48.92	40,852	61.90
Registered voters		65,995		65,995	
Source: Ministry of the Interior

=== 2012 ===
2012 legislative election in Gironde's 2nd constituency
Candidate	Party	First round		Second round	
Candidate	Party	Votes	%	Votes	%
Michèle Delaunay	PS	15,389	43.50%	19,219	58.44%
Nicolas Florian	UMP	12,128	34.28%	13,670	41.56%
Brigitte Comard	FG	2,526	7.14%		
Marie-Claude Noel	EELV	2,206	6.24%		
François Jay	FN	2,042	5.77%		
Valérie Peny	NPA	281	0.79%		
Julie Donnet	AEI	190	0.54%		
Christophe Bugeau	DLR	186	0.53%		
Jean-Marc Ferrari	MEI	155	0.44%		
Stéphane Boudy	DVG (BAG)	107	0.30%		
Guy Dupont	LO	97	0.27%		
Daniel Menuet	SP	68	0.19%		
Valid votes		35,375	98.96%	32,889	97.82%
Spoilt and null votes		372	1.04%	732	2.18%
Votes cast / turnout		35,747	57.49%	33,621	54.07%
Abstentions		26,429	42.51%	28,555	45.93%
Registered voters		62,176	100.00%	62,176	100.00%

=== 2007 ===
Legislative Election 2007: Gironde's 2nd constituency
Party	Candidate	Votes	%	±%
UMP	Alain Juppé	15,822	43.73	−4.55
PS	Michèle Delaunay	11,346	31.36	+1.02
MoDem	Ludovic Guinard	3,006	8.31	
LV	Pierre Hurmic	2,471	6.83	+1.15
FN	Jacques Colombier	1,036	2.86	−4.12
Far left	Emmanuel Bichindaritz	1,012	2.80	+0.85
Others	N/A	1,485		
Turnout		36,472	60.46	−5.19
2nd round result
PS	Michèle Delaunay	18,382	50.93	+6.42
UMP	Alain Juppé	17,712	49.07	−6.42
Turnout		36,840	61.07	+3.77
PS gain from UMP				

=== 2002 ===
Legislative Election 2002: Gironde's 2nd constituency
Party	Candidate	Votes	%	±%
UMP	Alain Juppé	16,331	48.28	+9.71
PS	Marion Paoletti	10,262	30.34	+2.34
FN	Chantal Bernard	2,362	6.98	−3.16
LV	Jean-Pierre Dufour	1,921	5.68	+1.95
PCF	Claude Mellier	771	2.28	−3.64
Others	N/A	2,180		
Turnout		34,254	65.65	+1.52
2nd round result
UMP	Alain Juppé	16,122	55.49	+1.5
PS	Marion Paoletti	12,932	44.51	−1.5
Turnout		29,900	57.30	−10.64
UMP hold				

=== 1997 ===
Legislative Election 1997: Gironde's 2nd constituency
Party	Candidate	Votes	%	±%
RPR	Alain Juppé	12,158	38.57	
PS	Gilles Savary	8,827	28.00	
FN	Pierre Sirgue	3,196	10.14	
PCF	Claude Mellier	1,866	5.92	
LV	Dominique Prost	1,175	3.73	
GE	Corinne Benand	1,029	3.26	
DVD	René Picard	970	3.08	
Others	N/A	2,300		
Turnout		32,483	64.13	
2nd round result
RPR	Alain Juppé	17,827	53.99	
PS	Gilles Savary	15,190	46.01	
Turnout		34,412	67.94	
RPR hold				

== Sources ==
- French Interior Ministry results website: "Résultats électoraux officiels en France" (in French).
