= Nelly Olin =

French politician

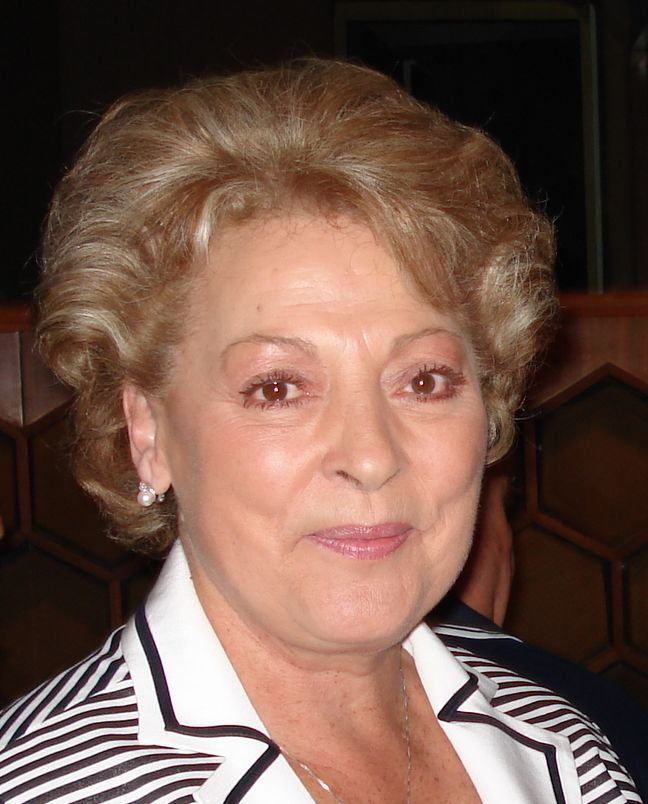

French Minister of the Environment
- In office 2005–2007
- President: Jacques Chirac
- Prime Minister: Dominique de Villepin
- Preceded by: Serge Lepeltier
- Succeeded by: Alain Juppé

Personal details
- Born: 23 March 1941 Paris, France
- Died: 26 October 2017 (aged 76) Meulan-en-Yvelines, France
- Party: UMP

Nelly Olin (23 March 1941 – 26 October 2017) was a Minister of Environment in France from 2005 to 2007, as part of the cabinet of prime minister Dominique de Villepin. Earlier, from 2004 to 2005, Olin had been the Minister-Delegate for Social Security. She has also been a Senator for Val-d'Oise. She died on 26 October 2017, aged 76.

== Biography ==
The daughter of a cleaning lady and a workshop manager, a graduate of the École Nationale de Commerce, and an executive assistant, she was elected mayor of Garges-lès-Gonesse in June 1995 and, three months later in September, senator (UMP) for Val-d'Oise.

A member of the Senate Delegation for Women's Rights and Equal Opportunities for Men and Women, she has held a number of local offices, including Regional Council of Île-de-France and vice-president of the Val-d'Oise General Council.

Between 1999 and 2004, she was chair of the parliamentary study group on the fight against drugs and drug addiction.

In 2003, she was a member of the Stasi Commission on Secularism.

Minister Delegate for Combating Precariousness and Exclusion, then Minister Delegate for Integration, Equal Opportunities and Combating Exclusion in Jean-Pierre Raffarin's government (3), she became Ministry of Ecological Transition (France) and Sustainable Development in Dominique de Villepin's government on 2 June 2005, a position she may owe to her past work as a member of the National Noise Council.

On 30 December 2004, she created the French Equal Opportunities and Anti-Discrimination Commission.

On 13 July 2007, Nelly Olin resigned from her position as first deputy mayor of the municipality of Garges-lès-Gonesse. On 5 October, she decided to leave politics and announced her decision to her supporters in the UMP party in Garges.

From 2007 to 2015, she was involved in the Christophe Bridou case, a former municipal police officer who accused her of slanderous denunciation of pedophilia, which led to his dismissal in 2002.

Nelly Olin was made a Knight of the Legion of Honour in 2008.

She lived in Meulan-en-Yvelines, where the mayor, Cécile Zammit-Popescu, is her niece. She died on 26 October 2017, at her home after a long illness and was buried in the cemetery in Garges-les-Gonesse.
