= Nicolas Thierry =

French politician (born 1975)

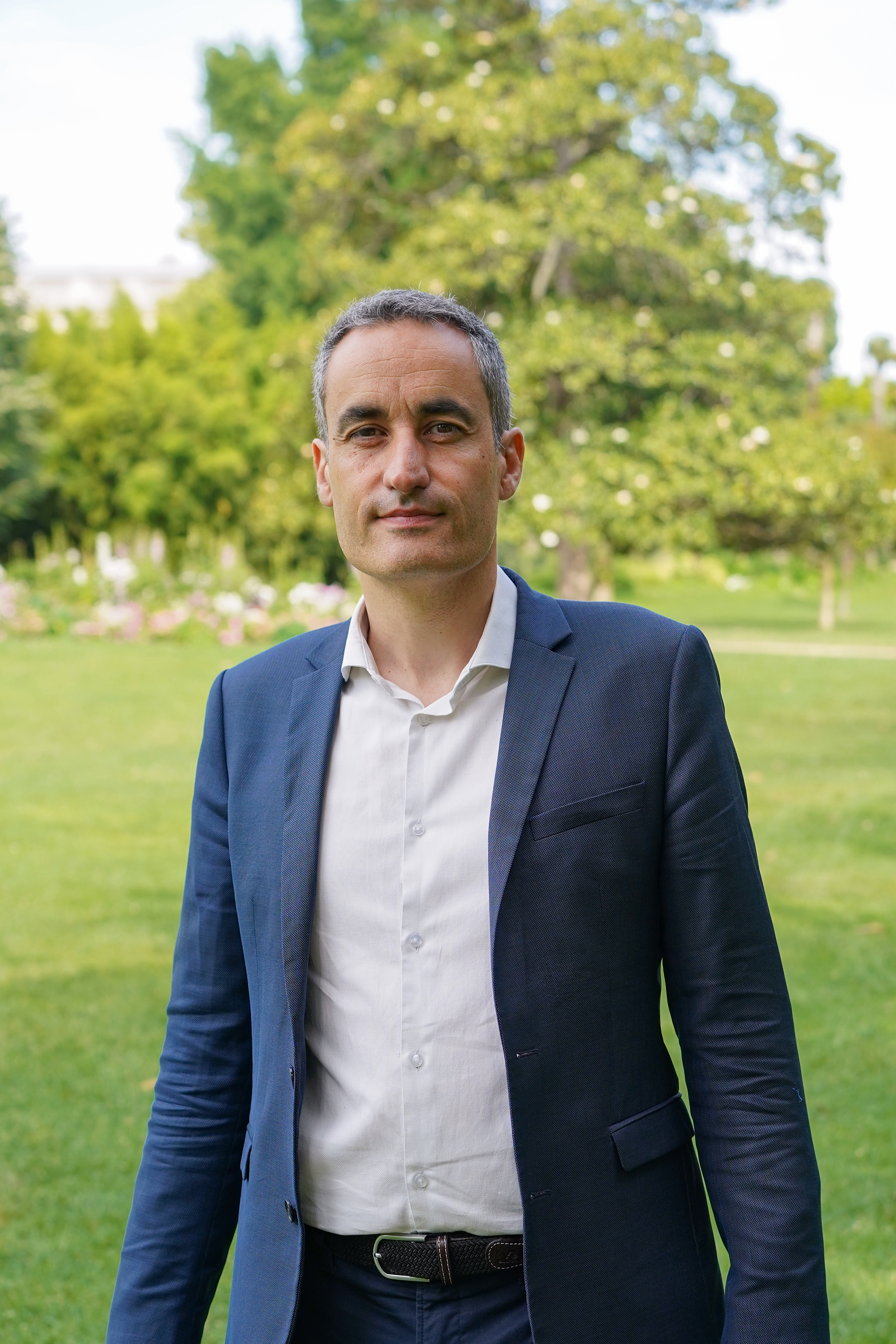
- Thierry in 2021

Member of the National Assembly for Gironde's 2nd constituency
- Incumbent
- Assumed office 22 June 2022
- Preceded by: Catherine Fabre

Personal details
- Born: Nicolas Thierry; 8 December 1975 (age 50) Créon, Gironde, France
- Party: Europe Ecology – The Greens
- Other political affiliations: NUPES
- Occupation: Environmentalist

Nicolas Thierry (French pronunciation: [nikɔla tjɛʁi]; born 8 December 1975) is a French politician and environmentalist. A member of the EELV, he was elected Member of Parliament for Gironde's 2nd constituency during the 2022 French legislative election.

== Early life ==
=== Childhood and education ===
Thierry was born in 1975 in Créon into a family of winegrowers. He dates the beginning of his political awareness to adolescence. In response to "the massive arrival of pesticides, the artificialization of soils and the disappearance of agricultural land", he mobilized in environmental associations.

In 2002, he obtained a DESS in environmental psychosociology at Paris-Sorbonne University.

== Political career ==
=== Regional councillor of Nouvelle-Aquitaine ===
In the 2015 elections, he was elected to the regional council of Nouvelle-Aquitaine where he is vice-president in charge of the environment.

In the 2021 French regional elections, he led the list of Europe Écologie Les Verts in Nouvelle-Aquitaine against Alain Rousset receiving 14% of the votes and becoming the leader of the ecologists in the regional council.

When Thierry was elected to the French Parliament in June 2022, he left the presidency of the environmentalist, solidarity and citizen group of the regional council. On 26 September 2023, he announced his resignation from the group in order to comply with the internal rule of non-cumulative mandates, after a year of transition. His resignation took effect on 16 October 2023 during the plenary session of the regional council.

=== Member of Parliament for Gironde ===
During the 2022 legislative elections, he was the candidate nominated by NUPES in Gironde's 2nd constituency. Thierry topped the poll in the first round and was elected MP in the second round with 53.34% of the votes.

In the National Assembly, Nicolas Thierry is a member of the Ecologist Group and sits on the Sustainable Development, Spatial and Regional Planning Committee.

== Political positions ==
=== PFAS ===
Thierry has an interest in Per- and polyfluoroalkyl substances, which are chemical compounds found in many manufactured products that are persistent in the environment and pose serious risks to human health. While the French government had held a report on the extent of PFAS contamination in France for several months, Thierry requested in March 2023 that it be made public. In April 2023, the report was finally published and revealed the worrying delay in France.

At the National Assembly, Nicolas Thierry warns of the health and environmental risks linked to PFAS. In June 2023, he carried out an operation aimed at testing the presence of these substances in the hair of his fellow deputies; the results showed widespread contamination of the parliamentarians tested. The environmentalist deputy calls as a priority for the ban on products containing PFAS and the control of the presence of these substances in drinking water.

=== Seabed mining ===
On 17 January 2023, Nicolas Thierry had a resolution adopted in the National Assembly inviting the government to defend a moratorium on deep sea mining and seabed mining.

== See also ==
- List of deputies of the 16th National Assembly of France
