= Julie Rechagneux =

French politician

Julie Rechagneux MEP
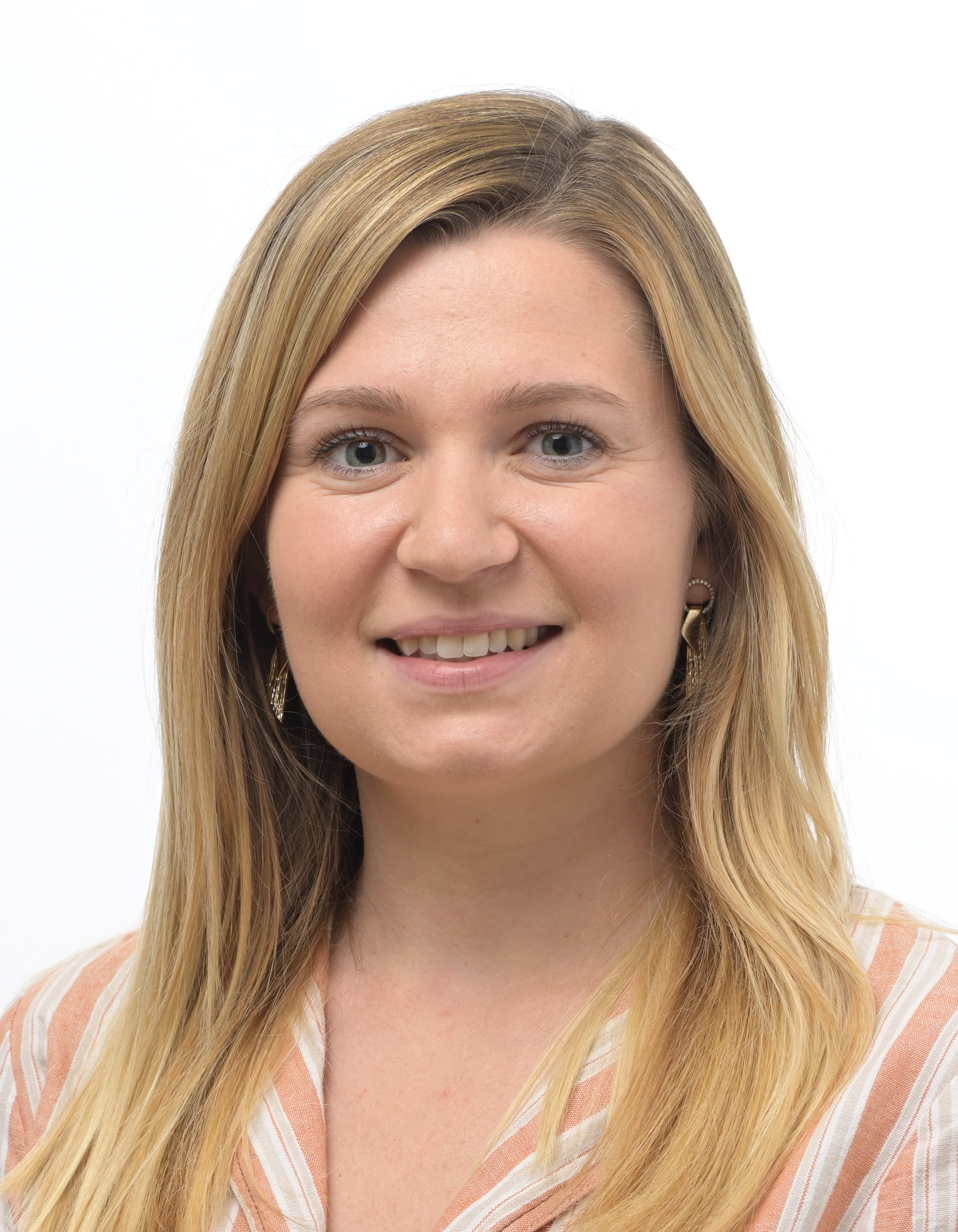
- Official portrait

Member of the European Parliament for France
- Incumbent
- Assumed office 16 July 2024

Personal details
- Born: 24 January 1996 (age 30)
- Party: National Rally (since 2013)
- Other political affiliations: Identity and Democracy Party
- Education: University of Bordeaux

Julie Rechagneux (born 24 January 1996) is a French politician of the National Rally (RN). She was elected member of the European Parliament in 2024. She has been serving as regional councillor of Nouvelle-Aquitaine since 2021, and is a municipal councillor in Lormont.

== Early life and career ==
Rechagneux was born in Clemont-Ferrand. She graduated from the University of Bordeaux with a master's degree in public law. She joined the National Rally in May 2013, at the age of 17. In the 2014 municipal elections, she managed her father's election campaign. She was a substitute candidate for the 2015 departmental elections, and a candidate for Gironde's 2nd constituency in 2017. As of 2017, she was leader Rassemblement national de la jeunesse in Aquitaine and secretary of RN in Gironde's 2nd constituency.

She was elected municipal councillor of Lormont in 2020, and regional councillor of Nouvelle-Aquitaine in 2021. She was a candidate for Gironde's 4th constituency in 2022, and is running for the same seat in the 2024 election.
