= Alain David (politician) =

French politician

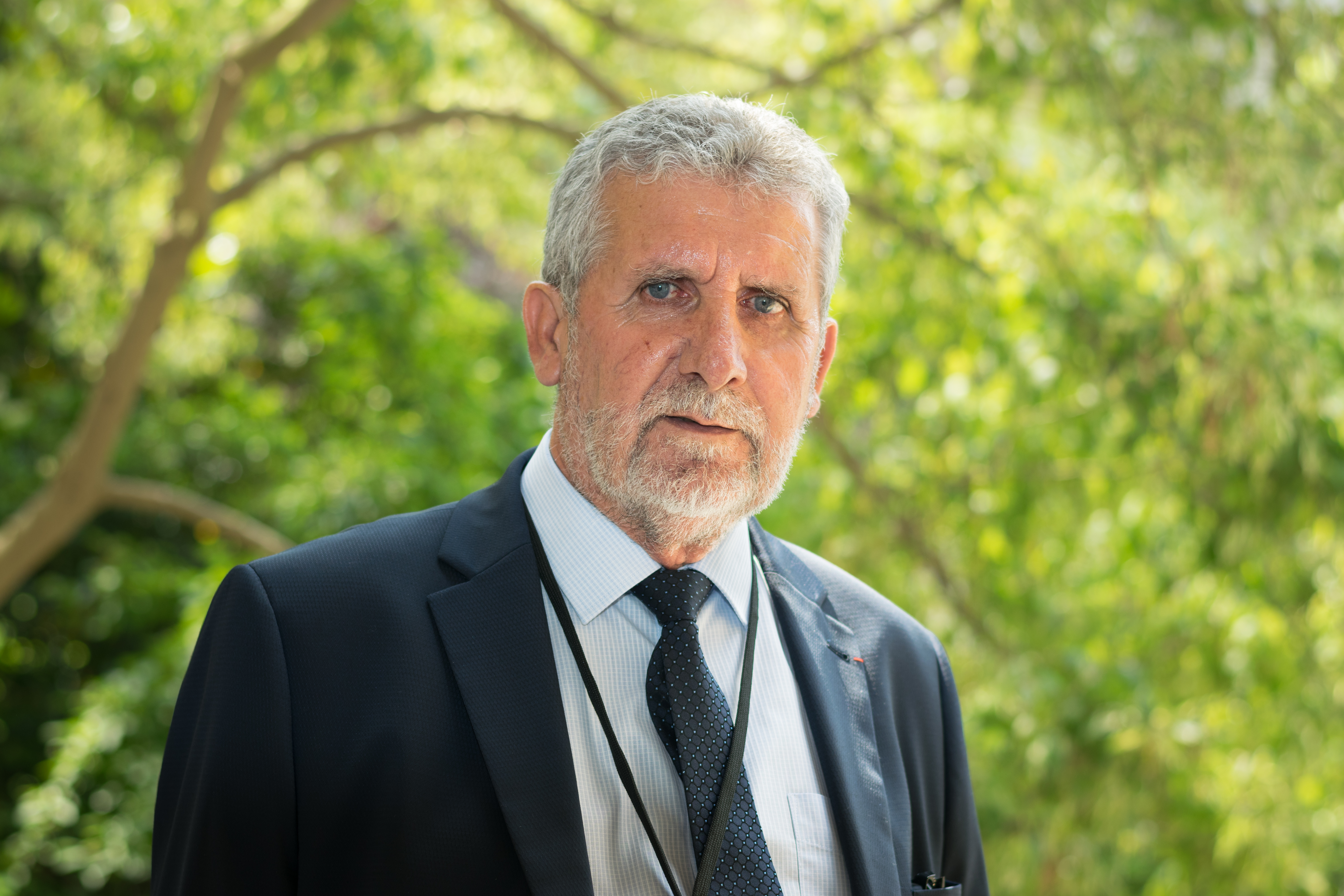
- Alain David in 2017.

Deputy of the National Assembly for Gironde's 4th constituency
- Incumbent
- Assumed office 21 June 2017
- Preceded by: Conchita Lacuey

Mayor of Cenon
- In office 25 June 1995 – 24 July 2017
- Preceded by: René Bonnac
- Succeeded by: Jean-François Egron

Personal details
- Born: 2 June 1949 (age 76) Libourne, France
- Party: Socialist Party

Alain David (born 2 June 1949) is a French politician representing the Socialist Party. He was elected to the French National Assembly on 18 June 2017, representing the department of Gironde.

In 2023, David publicly endorsed the re-election of the Socialist Party's chairman Olivier Faure.

== See also ==
- 2017 French legislative election
- List of deputies of the 15th National Assembly of France
