= Hugues Martin =

Former Mayor of Bordeaux

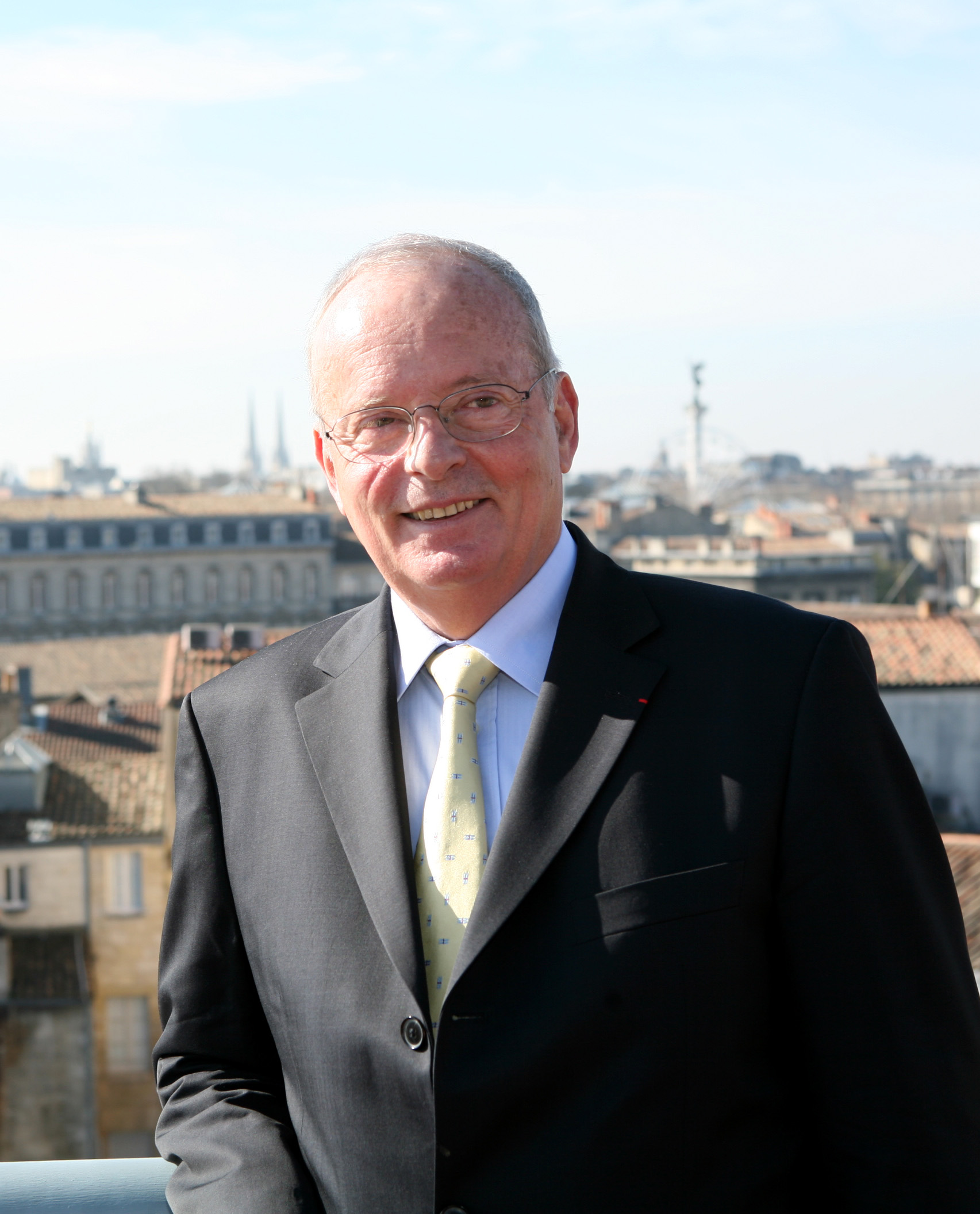
- Martin in 2006

Mayor of Bordeaux
- In office 2 December 2004 – 13 October 2006
- Preceded by: Alain Juppé
- Succeeded by: Alain Juppé

Member of the National Assembly for Gironde's 2nd constituency
- In office 22 November 2004 – 19 June 2007
- Preceded by: Alain Juppé
- Succeeded by: Michèle Delaunay

Member of the European Parliament
- In office 20 July 1999 – 19 July 2004

Personal details
- Born: 2 January 1942 (age 84) Mâcon, Saône-et-Loire, France
- Party: UNR (until 1967); UDR (1967–1976); RPR (1976–2002); UMP (2002–2015); LR (since 2015)

Hugues Martin is a French politician who has served as the mayor of Bordeaux, and has been a member in both the European Parliament and French National Assembly.

== Biography ==
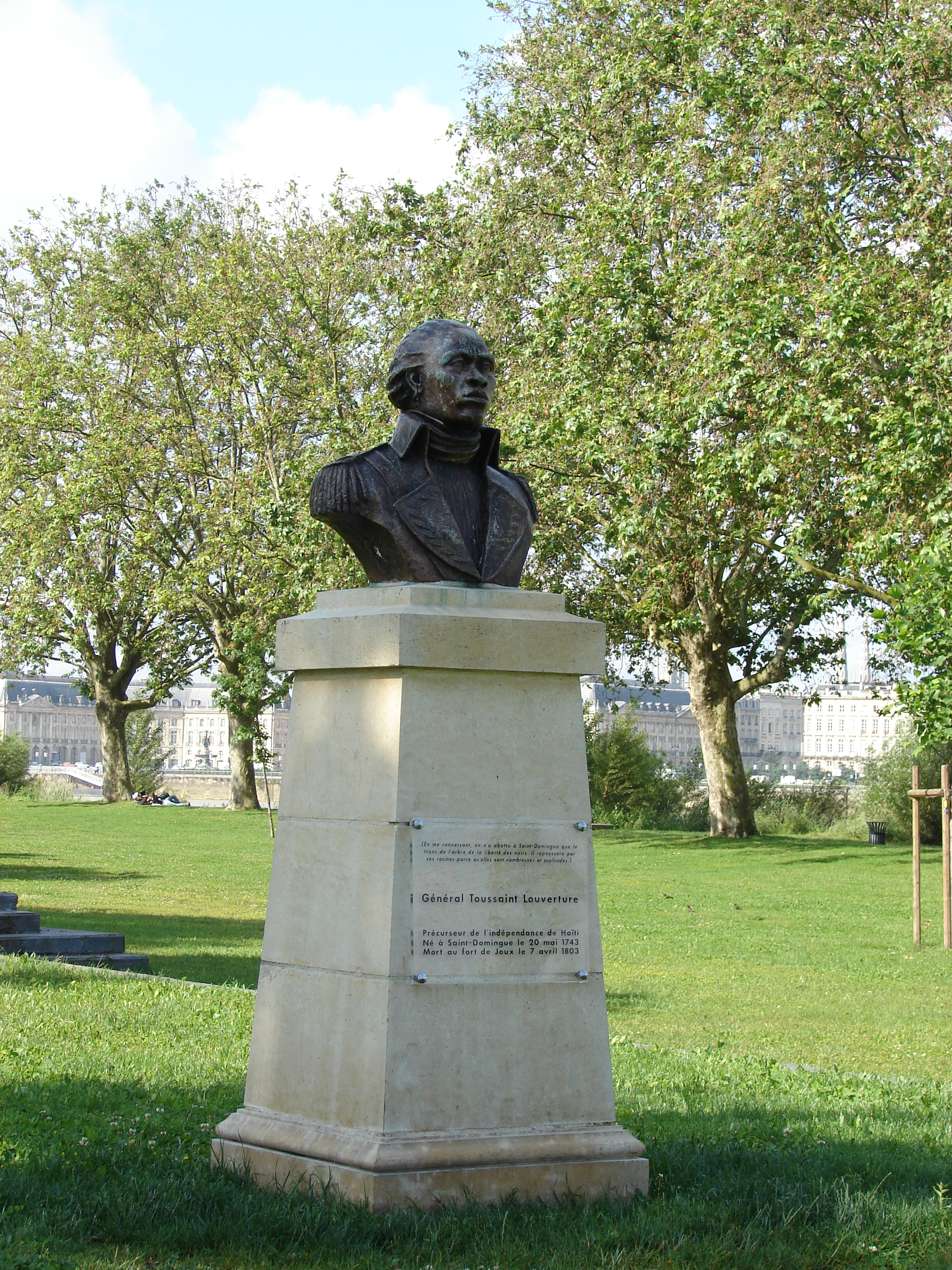
The bronze bust of Toussaint Louverture.

Martin was born in 1942 in Mâcon, France. He served as a second lieutenant in the 2nd Foreign Parachute Regiment, he was also an insurance agent for one of the largest insurance firms in Aquitaine.

Martin started his political career as a Gaullist activist and initially became a member of the Gaullist Youth Movement (UJP). He was elected to the Bordeaux Métropole in 1971, of which he would rise to be the Vice-President of in 1989, he was also the General Councillor for the 3rd canton of Bordeaux from 1979 to 1999 and a deputy mayor of Bordeaux. He was elected into the European Parliament in the 1999 elections.

=== Mayor of Bordeaux ===
In 2004, Alain Juppé was tried for abuse of public funds and resigned, leaving Martin who was deputy mayor to become mayor of Bordeaux and the member of the national assembly for Gironde's 2nd constituency. A major part of Martins term as mayor was a focus and recognition of the cities history with slavery, led especially alongside activist Karfa Diallo, which included such things as the erection of a bronze bust of Toussaint Louverture, the establishment of the "Committee for Reflection on the Slave Trade in Bordeaux" with Denis Tillinac as its chairman and setting up permanent rooms dedicated to the history of slavery in the Museum of Aquitaine. He was succeeded by Juppé in 2006 as he did not run in the 2006 election.

In 2010 he was appointed to the CESE, where he led to economics and finance section.
