= Michèle Delaunay =

French politician

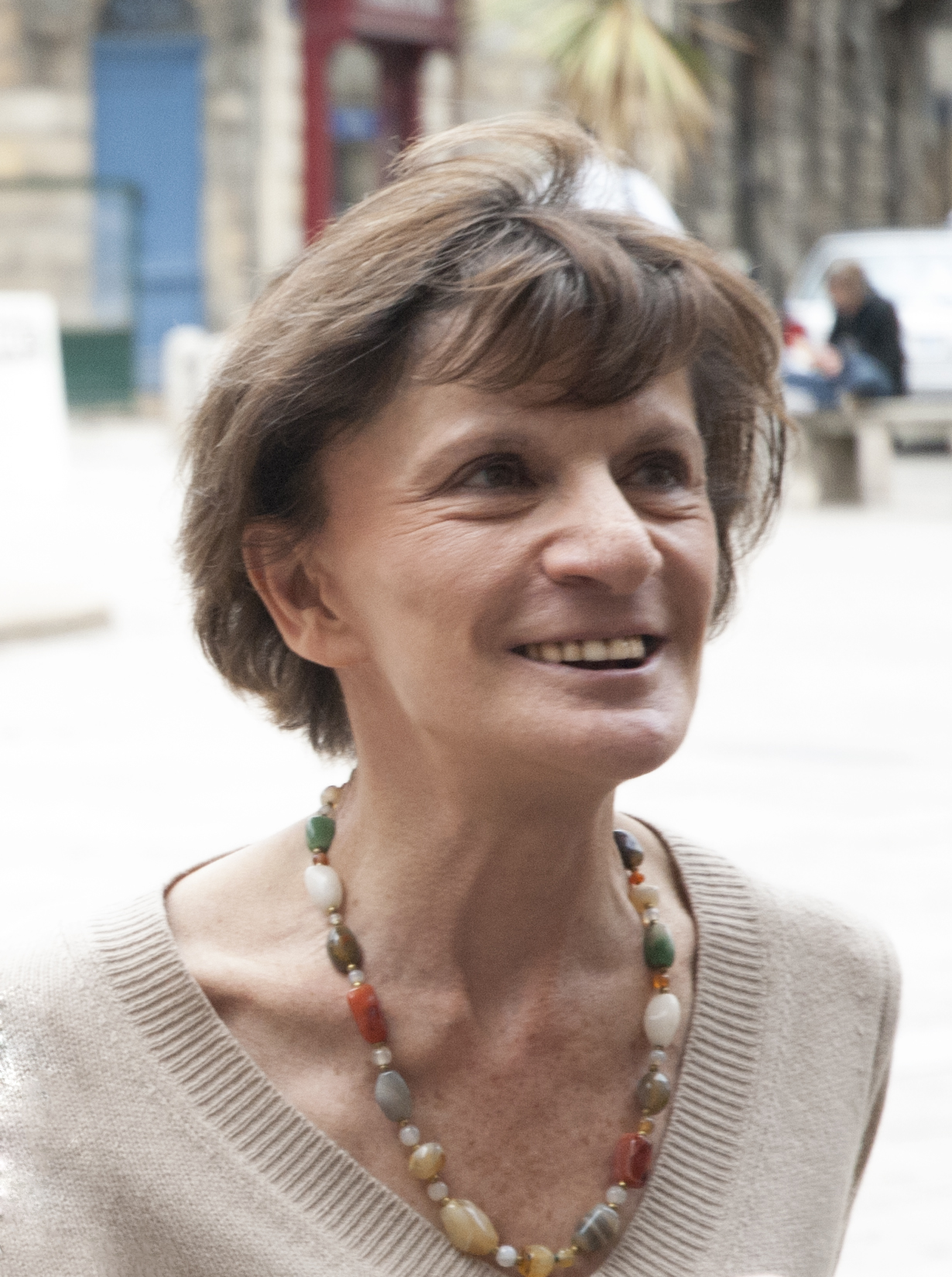

Junior Minister for the Elderly and Dependent Care
- In office 2012–2014
- President: François Hollande
- Prime Minister: Jean-Marc Ayrault
- Preceded by: Marie-Anne Montchamp
- Succeeded by: Laurence Rossignol

Member of the National Assembly for Gironde's 2nd constituency
- In office 2012–2014
- Preceded by: Vincent Feltesse
- Succeeded by: Catherine Fabre

Personal details
- Born: 8 January 1947 (age 79) Clermont-Ferrand, France
- Party: Socialist Party
- Spouse: Klaus Fuchs
- Profession: Oncologist

Michèle Delaunay (French pronunciation: [miʃɛl dəlonɛ]; born Clermont-Ferrand, 8 January 1947) is a French oncologist and politician who served as Junior Minister for the Elderly and Dependent Care at the Ministry of Social Affairs and Health under President François Hollande from 2012 to 2014. She was a member of the National Assembly of France where she represented the 2nd constituency of the Gironde on behalf of the Socialist Party.

== Political career ==
=== Career in local politics ===
- General councillor of Gironde : Since 2004. Reelected in 2011.
- Municipal councillor of Bordeaux : 2001-2007 (Resignation).

=== Career in national politics ===
Delaunay served as a member of the National Assembly of France for Gironde (2nd constituency) from 2007. In parliament, she was on the Committee on Social Affairs (2009–2012, 2014–2017) and the Committee on Cultural Affairs and Education (2007–2009).

In the Socialist Party's 2011 primaries, Delaunay endorsed François Hollande as the party's candidate for the 2012 presidential election.

=== Junior Minister for the Elderly and Dependent Care, 2012–2014 ===
On 15 April 2013, Delaunay was forced to reveal personal financial information by President Hollande, who demanded that all ministers publish details of their personal wealth. Her net worth was reported at over $7 million, including $20,000 worth of jewelry.
