= List of members of the European Parliament for France, 1999–2004 =

This is a list of the members of the European Parliament for France in the 1999 to 2004 session.

Members of the European Parliament from France
ECSC delegation	(1952)
EP delegation	(1958)
1st term	(1979)
2nd term	(1984)
3rd term	(1989)
4th term	(1994)
5th term	(1999)
6th term	(2004)
7th term	(2009)
8th term	(2014)
9th term	(2019)
10th term	(2024)

Name	National party	EP Group
Charles Pasqua	Rally for France	UEN
Philippe de Villiers (until 16 December 1999) Alexandre Varaut (from 17 December 2001)	Rally for France (until 22 November 2000) Movement for France	UEN (until 30 January 2001) NI
Marie-Françoise Garaud	Independent	NI
Georges Berthu	Rally for France (until 22 November 2000) Movement for France	UEN (until 30 January 2001) NI
William Abitbol	Rally for France	UEN (until 14 March 2001) EDD
Elizabeth Montfort	Rally for France (until 22 November 2000) Movement for France (until 9 September 2003) Union for a Popular Movement	UEN (until 30 January 2001) NI (until 1 June 2003) EPP–ED
Isabelle Caullery	Rally for France (until 20 January 2003) Union for a Popular Movement	UEN
Dominique Souchet	Rally for France (until 22 November 2000) Movement for France	UEN (until 30 January 2001) NI
Jean-Charles Marchiani	Rally for France	UEN
Thierry de la Perriere	Rally for France (until 22 November 2000) Movement for France	UEN (until 30 January 2001) NI
Florence Kuntz	Rally for France	UEN (until 14 March 2001) EDD
Nicole Thomas-Mauro	Rally for France (until 22 November 2000) Movement for France (until 16 June 2003) Union for a Popular Movement	UEN (until 30 January 2001) NI (until 10 March 2003) UEN
Paul Coûteaux	Rally for France	UEN (until 14 March 2001) EDD
François Hollande (until 17 December 1999) Anne Ferreira (from 18 December 1999)	Socialist Party	PES
Pervenche Berès	Socialist Party	PES
Sami Naïr	Citizens' Movement	PES (until 26 June 2002) NI (until 30 June 2002) GUE/NGL
Catherine Lalumière	Radical Party of the Left	PES
Michel Rocard	Socialist Party	PES
Danielle Darras	Socialist Party	PES
Georges Garot	Socialist Party	PES
Marie-Noëlle Lienemann (27 March 2001) André Laignel (from 28 March 2001 to 4 April 2001) Michel-Ange Scarbonchi	Socialist Party (until 4 April 2001) Radical Party of the Left (until 17 September 2002) Republican Pole	PES (until 26 June 2002) NI (until 30 June 2002) GUE/NGL
Gérard Caudron	Socialist Party (until 9 July 2002) Independent Socialist	PES (until 26 January 2002) NI (until 30 June 2002) GUE/NGL
Marie-Hélène Gillig	Socialist Party	PES
Jean-Claude Fruteau	Socialist Party	PES
Marie-Arlette Carlotti	Socialist Party	PES
Adeline Hazan	Socialist Party	PES
Gilles Savary	Socialist Party	PES
Michel Dary	Radical Party of the Left	PES (until 26 June 2002) NI (until 30 June 2002) GUE/NGL
Béatrice Patrie	Socialist Party	PES
Bernard Poignant	Socialist Party	PES
Martine Roure	Socialist Party	PES
Catherine Guy-Quint	Socialist Party	PES
Olivier Duhamel	Socialist Party	PES
François Zimeray	Socialist Party	PES
Harlem Désir	Socialist Party	PES
Nicolas Sarkozy (until 14 September 1999) Brice Hortefeux (from 14 September 1999)	Rally for the Republic (until 26 June 2002) Union for the Presidential Majority (until 17 November 2002) Union for a Popular Movement	EPP–ED
Alain Madelin (from 16 June 2002) Anne-Marie Schaffner (until 28 June 2002)	Liberal Democracy (until 16 June 2002) Union for the Presidential Majority - Rally for the Republic (until 17 November 2002) Union for a Popular Movement	EPP–ED
Margie Sudre	Rally for the Republic (until 1 December 2002) Union for a Popular Movement	EPP–ED
Françoise Grossetête	Liberal Democracy (until 17 November 2002) Union for a Popular Movement	EPP–ED
Hugues Martin	Rally for the Republic (until 1 December 2002) Union for a Popular Movement	EPP–ED
Thierry Jean-Pierre	Liberal Democracy	EPP–ED
Joseph Daul	Rally for France (until 1 December 2002) Union for a Popular Movement	EPP–ED
Tokia Saïfi (until 6 May 2002) Marie-Hélène Descamps (from 13 June 2002)	Liberal Democracy (until 1 December 2002) Union for a Popular Movement	EPP–ED
Marie-Thérèse Hermange	Rally for the Republic (until 1 December 2002) Union for a Popular Movement	EPP–ED
Christine De Veyrac	Independent (until 1 December 2002) Union for a Popular Movement	EPP–ED
Roger Karoutchi (until 31 December 1999) Dominique Vlasto (from 1 January 2000)	Rally for the Republic (until 31 December 1999) Liberal Democracy (until 1 December 2002) Union for a Popular Movement	EPP–ED
Hervé Novelli (until 16 June 2002) Jean-Pierre Bebear (from 28 June 2002)	Liberal Democracy (until 16 June 2002) Union for the Presidential Majority (until 17 November 2002) Union for a Popular Movement	EPP–ED (until 4 February 2002) ELDR (until 16 June 2002) EPP–ED
Daniel Cohn-Bendit	The Greens	G–EFA
Marie Anne Isler Béguin	The Greens	G–EFA
Alain Lipietz	The Greens	G–EFA
Hélène Flautre	The Greens	G–EFA
Gérard Onesta	The Greens	G–EFA
Danielle Auroi	The Greens	G–EFA
Didier-Claude Rod	The Greens	G–EFA
Alima Boumediene-Thiery	The Greens	G–EFA
Yves Piétrasanta (until 2 February 2004) Marie-Françoise Duthu (until 3 February 2004)	The Greens	G–EFA
François Bayrou (until 16 June 2002) Françoise de Veyrinas (from 28 June 2002)	Union for French Democracy (until 16 June 2002) Union for the Presidential Majority (until 17 November 2002) Union for a Popular Movement (until 17 November 2002)	EPP–ED
Nicole Fontaine (until 16 June 2002) Fabienne Keller (from 17 June 2002 until 2 July 2002) Jean-Thomas Nordmann (from 3 July 2002)	Union for French Democracy (until 2 July 2002) Union for French Democracy - Radical Party	EPP–ED (until 15 December 2003) ELDR
Philippe Morillon	Union for French Democracy	EPP–ED
Alain Lamassoure	Union for French Democracy (until 1 July 2003) Union for a Popular Movement	EPP–ED
Jean-Louis Bourlanges	Union for French Democracy	EPP–ED
Marielle De Sarnez	Union for French Democracy	EPP–ED
Janelly Fourtou	Union for French Democracy	EPP–ED
Thierry Cornillet	Union for French Democracy	EPP–ED
Francis Decourrière	Union for French Democracy	EPP–ED
Jean Saint-Josse	Hunting, Fishing, Nature, Traditions	EDD
Michel Raymond	Hunting, Fishing, Nature, Traditions	EDD
Véronique Mathieu	Hunting, Fishing, Nature, Traditions	EDD
Yves Butel	Hunting, Fishing, Nature, Traditions	EDD
Jean-Louis Bernié	Hunting, Fishing, Nature, Traditions	EDD
Alain Esclopé	Hunting, Fishing, Nature, Traditions	EDD
Jean-Marie Le Pen (until 10 April 2004) Marie-France Stirbois (from 11 Aprtil 2003)	National Front	TGI (2 October 2001) NI
Charles de Gaulle	National Front	TGI (2 October 2001) NI
Jean-Claude Martinez	National Front	TGI (2 October 2001) NI
Bruno Gollnisch	National Front	TGI (2 October 2001) NI
Carl Lang	National Front	TGI (2 October 2001) NI
Arlette Laguiller	Workers' Struggle	GUE/NGL
Alain Krivine	Revolutionary Communist League	GUE/NGL
Armonia Bordes	Workers' Struggle	GUE/NGL
Roseline Vachetta	Revolutionary Communist League	GUE/NGL
Chantal Cauquil	Workers' Struggle	GUE/NGL
Robert Hue (until 31 July 2000) Philippe Herzog (from 1 August 2000)	Communist Party (until 31 July 2000) Independent	GUE/NGL
Geneviève Fraisse	Independent	GUE/NGL
Yasmine Boudjenah	Communist Party	GUE/NGL
Francis Wurtz	Communist Party	GUE/NGL
Fodé Sylla	Independent	GUE/NGL
Sylviane Ainardi	Communist Party	GUE/NGL

== See also ==
- Members of the European Parliament 1999–2004
- List of members of the European Parliament, 1999–2004 - for a full alphabetical list
- 1999 European Parliament election in France
