= 1994 European Parliament election in France =

| ← 1989 | 12 June 1994 | 1999 → |
- All 87 French seats in the European Parliament
| Party | Leader | Vote % | Seats | +/– |
|---|---|---|---|---|
| UDF–RPR | Dominique Baudis | 25.58 | 28 | +2 |
| PS | Michel Rocard | 14.49 | 15 | −5 |
| MAE | Philippe de Villiers | 12.34 | 13 | New |
| MRG | Bernard Tapie | 12.03 | 13 | +11 |
| FN | Jean-Marie Le Pen | 10.52 | 11 | +1 |
| PCF | Francis Wurtz | 6.89 | 7 | 0 |
This lists parties that won seats. See the complete results below.

European Parliament elections were held in France on 12 June 1994. Six lists were able to win seats: an alliance of the centre-right Union for French Democracy (UDF) and the Gaullist Rally for the Republic (RPR), the Socialist Party (PS), the Left Radical Party (MRG), the French Communist Party, the National Front (FN) and Philippe de Villiers' eurosceptic right-wing dissident UDF list, which formed the Majority for Another Europe (MAE). 53.5% of the French population turned out on election day, an improvement on the last election in 1989. The Greens, who were weakened by an Ecology Generation list led by Brice Lalonde (winning 2.01%) and also suffering from internal divisions between the party's left (who wanted an electoral alliance with the Socialists and the left) and the right (rejecting all alliances), lost all 9 seats won in 1989. Arlette Laguiller's Trotskyst Workers' Struggle (2.27%), Jean-Pierre Chevènement's left-wing eurosceptic Citizens' Movement (2.54%), the L'Europe commence à Sarajevo List (1.57%) and the agrarian populist Hunting, Fishing, Nature, Traditions (3.96%) were among the notable lists which did not pass the 5% threshold.

With 14.49%, the Socialists, the party of President François Mitterrand, whose list was led by Michel Rocard suffered its worst result ever in a European election, losing votes mainly to the Radical list led by wealthy businessman and a protégé of Mitterrand, Bernard Tapie. Most analysts agreed that Mitterrand supported Tapie's list behind the scenes, since Rocard was a personal rival of Mitterrand and he wished to destroy Rocard's chances in the 1995 presidential election. In fact, Rocard resigned as First Secretary of the PS shortly thereafter and did not run in 1995 – Lionel Jospin was the Socialist candidate.

The other surprise was Philippe de Villiers success. Villiers, the President of the General Council of Vendée, was a eurosceptic member of the liberal component (PR) of the pro-European UDF. He won a surprisingly strong 12.34%, and his thirteen MEPs formed the nucleus of the Europe of Nations group. However, his success did not lead him to immediate political successes – he polled barely 4% in the 1995 presidential election.

== Results ==
| Party | Votes | % | Seats | +/– |
|---|---|---|---|---|
| Union for France | 4,985,574 | 25.58 | 28 | New |
| Socialist Party | 2,824,173 | 14.49 | 15 | –5 |
| Majority for Another Europe | 2,404,105 | 12.34 | 13 | New |
| Movement of Radicals of the Left | 2,344,457 | 12.03 | 13 | +11 |
| National Front | 2,050,086 | 10.52 | 11 | +1 |
| French Communist Party | 1,342,222 | 6.89 | 7 | 0 |
| Hunting, Fishing, Nature, Traditions | 771,061 | 3.96 | 0 | 0 |
| The Greens | 574,806 | 2.95 | 0 | –9 |
| Citizens' Movement | 494,986 | 2.54 | 0 | New |
| Lutte Ouvrière | 442,723 | 2.27 | 0 | 0 |
| Ecology Generation | 392,291 | 2.01 | 0 | New |
| Europe Begins at Sarajevo | 305,633 | 1.57 | 0 | New |
| Jobs First! | 125,340 | 0.64 | 0 | New |
| Natural Law Party | 103,261 | 0.53 | 0 | New |
| Workers' Party | 84,513 | 0.43 | 0 | New |
| Regionalist and Federalist List | 76,436 | 0.39 | 0 | New |
| Democrats for a United States of Europe | 71,814 | 0.37 | 0 | New |
| Life Policy for Europe | 56,658 | 0.29 | 0 | New |
| PPDG–PPM–PCR–PSG | 37,041 | 0.19 | 0 | New |
| Europe for All | 290 | 0.00 | 0 | New |
| Total | 19,487,470 | 100.00 | 87 | +6 |
| Valid votes | 19,487,470 | 94.67 | | |
| Invalid/blank votes | 1,097,510 | 5.33 | | |
| Total votes | 20,584,980 | 100.00 | | |
| Registered voters/turnout | 39,019,797 | 52.76 | | |
Source: France Politique

== Members elected ==
=== UDF – RPR ===
- Dominique Baudis
- Hélène Carrère d'Encausse
- Yves Galland
- Christian Jacob
- Jean-Pierre Raffarin
- Armelle Guinebertiére
- Nicole Fontaine
- Alain Pompidou
- Yves Verwaerde
- Marie-Thérèse Hermange
- Jean-Louis Bourlanges
- Jacques Donnay
- Françoise Grossetête
- Blaise Aldo
- Robert Hersant
- Anne-Marie Schaffner
- Francis Decourrière
- Christian Cabrol
- Bernard Stasi
- Jean-Claude Pasty
- André Soulier
- Jean-Pierre Bazin
- Pierre Bernard-Reymond
- Raymond Chesa
- Georges de Brémond d'Ars
- Jean Baggioni
- Jean-Pierre Bebear
- Gérard d'Aboville

=== PS ===
- Michel Rocard
- Catherine Trautmann
- Bernard Kouchner
- Danielle Darras
- André Laignel
- Nicole Pery
- Jack Lang
- Frédérique Bredin
- Pierre Moscovici
- Élisabeth Guigou
- Jean-Pierre Cot
- Pervenche Berès
- François Bernardini
- Michèle Lindeperg
- Gérard Caudron

=== UDF dissidents ===
- Philippe de Villiers
- James Goldsmith
- Charles de Gaulle
- Thierry Jean-Pierre
- Philippe-Armand Martin
- Françoise Seillier
- Georges Berthu
- Hervé Fabre-Aubrespy
- Dominique Souchet
- Anne Christine Poisson
- Frédéric Striby
- Edouard Des Places
- Marie-France de Rose

=== PRG ===
- Bernard Tapie
- Jean-François Hory
- Catherine Lalumière
- Christiane Taubira-Delannon
- Noël Mamère
- Michel Dary
- André Sainjon
- Bernard Castagnède
- Odile Leperre-Verrier
- Pierre Pradier
- Christine Barthet-Mayer
- Dominique Saint-Pierre
- Antoinette Fouque

=== FN ===
- Jean-Marie Le Pen
- Bruno Mégret
- Bruno Gollnisch
- Jean-Claude Martinez
- Carl Lang
- Marie-France Stirbois
- Bernard Antony
- Yvan Blot
- Jean-Marie Le Chevallier
- Fernand Le Rachinel
- Jean-Yves Le Gallou

=== PCF ===
- Francis Wurtz
- Sylviane Ainardi
- Philippe Herzog
- Gisèle Moreau
- René Piquet
- Mireille Elmalan
- Aline Pailler
