= Magdeleine Anglade =

French politician (1921–1998)

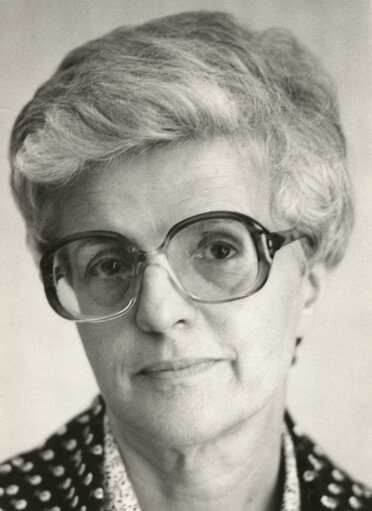

Senator for Paris
- In office 28 September 1994 – 24 September 1995

Member of the European Parliament
- In office 6 October 1982 – 18 November 1983
- Parliamentary group: European Progressive Democrats (1982–1983)
- Constituency: France
- In office 24 July 1984 – 24 July 1989
- Parliamentary group: European Democratic Alliance (1984–1989)
- Constituency: France

Councillor of Paris
- In office 8 March 1983 – 19 March 1989

Personal details
- Born: 5 July 1921 Valence, Drôme, France
- Died: 25 March 1998 (aged 76) Paris, France
- Party: National Centre of Independents and Peasants; Rally for the Republic
- Spouse: Louis Anglade (m. 1947)
- Awards: Chevalier of the Légion d'honneur

Magdeleine Anglade (5 July 1921 – 25 March 1998) was a French politician and company director who served two terms as a Member of the European Parliament (MEP) for the National Centre of Independents and Peasants party from 1982 to 1984 and in the Senate for the Rally for the Republic party as a senator for the Paris department between 1994 and 1995. She was a councillor of Paris' 8th arrondissement and then Paris' 1st arrondissement while also serving as Deputy Mayor of Paris. Anglade was appointed Chevalier of the Légion d'honneur in December 1995.

== Early life ==
Anglade was born in Valence, Drôme on 5 July 1921. She did her higher education studies in Lyon. Anglade enlisted in the Grenoble section of the Red Cross as an ambulance nurse in 1940 and remained there until the conclusion of the Second World War. The Red Cross requested her to form part of a medical convoy to care for the detained prisoners at the liberated Buchenwald concentration camp. She graduated from the Faculty of Law and Literature at the University of Lyon in 1945. Between 1950 and 1954, Anglade continued to work as a Red Cross ambulance driver and tended to wounded soldiers in Indochina.

== Career ==
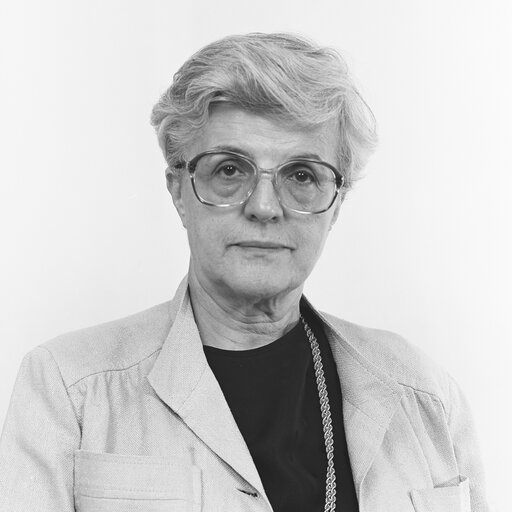
Magdeleine Anglade

She was the secretary general of the National Regrouping for the Unity of the Republic parliamentary group in the National Assembly from 1959 to 1962. Anglade was a founder member of the National Committee for French Muslims (which has the goal of integrating Harkis and their families into European France) in 1963 and was part of its management. She was politically involved in the National Centre of Independents and Peasants in 1972 and joined its steering committee. During the mid-1970s, Anglade also involved herself with Algerians who left the country following its independence from France.

During the 1979 European Parliament election in France, she failed to gain election to the European Parliament, being 33rd on the list of the National Centre of Independents and Peasants' list. After Jean Méo resigned, Anglade was elected to the European Parliament in a by-election that was held on 6 October 1982 and joined the European Progressive Democrats as a member. She was a member of the Committee on External Economic Relations and the Delegation for relations with the People's Republic of China. Anglade resigned as an MEP on 18 November 1983 to allow others to be on the party's election list. She was elected councillor of Paris' 8th arrondissement in the 1983 French municipal elections on 8 March 1983 and was appointed the 19th Deputy Mayor of Paris soon after and held both positions until the 1989 French municipal elections when she was elected councillor of Paris' 1st arrondissement and assisted its mayor Michel Caldaguès. Anglade was in charge in dealing with issues relating to employment and training, establishing permanent jobs in select boroughs, organising "meetings-jobs" and the pro-employment association called Paris-Information-Employment-Training Association. She was also vice-president of the Council of Paris.

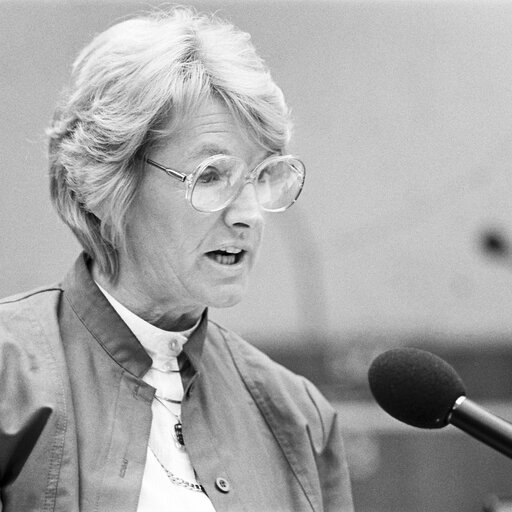
Magdeleine Anglade in 1985

At the 1984 European Parliament election in France held that June, Anglade gained reelection to the European Parliament and took up her seat on 24 July 1984 as a member of the European Democratic Alliance. She was vice-chair of the Delegation for relations with the United States from January 1987 to July 1989 and was a member of the Bureau of the European Parliament between October 1987 and July 1989. Anglade was a member of the Committee on Budgetary Control, the Committee on Women's Rights, the Economic and Monetary Affairs and Industrial Policy and the Political Affairs Committee. She was a substitute of the Committee on Institutional Affairs, the Committee on Social Affairs and Employment and the Political Affairs Committee. Anglade left the National Centre of Independents and Peasants' steering committee in May 1986, citing the rise of the National Front party.

On 28 September 1994, she was elected to the Senate to represent the Paris department as a Rally for the Republic senator in a by-election held following the September 1994 death of François Collet. Anglade was a member of the Cultural Affairs Committee. She left the Senate on 24 September 1995, having decided not to stand for re-election. Anglade was appointed chair of the supervisory board of the magazine publishers Valmonde in January 1991, having been its since 1972. She was selected to become vice-president of the Union of the Parisian weekly press and was also vice-president of the Professional Syndicate of Magazine and Opinion Press as well as honorary vice-president of the National Committee for French Muslims.

== Personal life ==
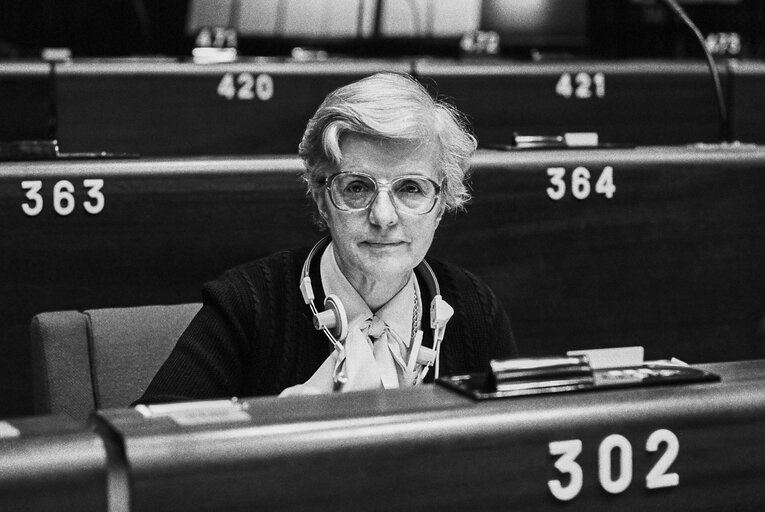
Magdeleine Anglade in 1985

She married Louis Anglade in Argelès-sur-Mer, Pyrénées-Orientales in April 1947. On 30 December 1995, Anglade was appointed Chevalier of the Légion d'honneur as a "former senator from Paris, honorary European parliamentarian; 47 years of professional activities and elective functions." She died on 25 March 1998 in Paris and her funeral took place at the La Madeleine, Paris six days later. The Paris Mayor paid tribute to her in the Council of Paris on 6 April.
