= Aline Pailler =

French journalist and politician

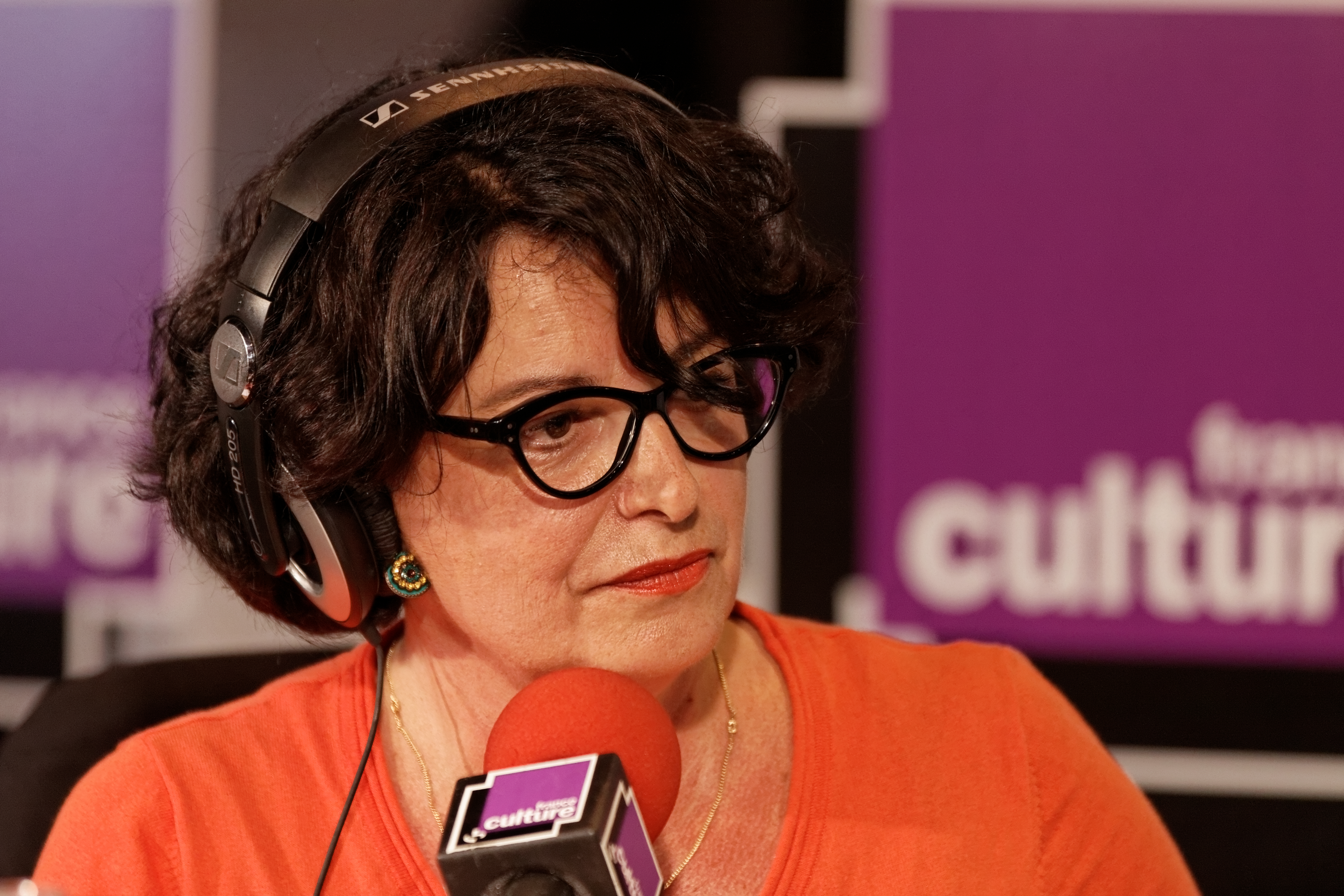
Photo of Aline Pailler

Aline Pailler (born 27 July 1955 in Casablanca) is a French journalist and politician.

== Political career ==
In 1994, she was elected to the European Parliament, serving as a Member of the European Parliament until 1999 as a member of the French Communist Party.

She ran in the 2001 Toulouse City Council elections on the list of the Revolutionary Communist League. However, after being found in violation of electoral financing rules, she was struck from the list and barred from running for public office for a year.

She was active in the 2017–2018 protests in France against the labour reform law presented by the French government. In an interview, she stated that she regretted violent acts done by certain protestors, but that she considered those acts a necessarily evil as she saw no other way to fight against institutional violence, which she called "the ones who actually break things, who break lives, not just windows."

== Media career ==
Pailler has been a member of several radio programmes, including Sans tambour ni trompette with Jean-François Kahn, Chocolatine, Les Dromomaniaques, Sens dessus dessous, and L'oreille en coin on France Inter. She also used to present a programme on Radio Bleue.

From September 2007 to July 2017, she was the producer of Jusqu'à la lune et retour on France Culture, which presented youth literature and culture. On her retirement from the programme in 2017, she declared that she had only become more politically radical with age and that she would continue advocating communist ideals.

She has also done some work on television, including Le Cercle de minuit on France 2 and Regards de Femme on FR3.

== Bibliography ==
- Un Monde à changer, with Francis Wurtz, Éditions sociales, 1993
- La Marmite, J. C. Lattès, 1994
- Femmes en marche, Temps des cerises, 2001
- Altergouvernement, a collective work also featuring Paul Ariès, Geneviève Azam, Marc Dufumier, Marie Duru-Bellat, Claude Egullion, Jean-Baptiste Eyraud, Susan George, Franck Lepage, Jean-Marie Harribey, Philippe Leymarie, Laurent Mucchielli, Nathalie Péré-Marzano, Fabien Piasecki, Michel Pinçon, Monique Pinçon-Charlot, Clarisse Taron, et Jacques Testart, éditions CtLe Muscadier, 2012 .
