= Valérie Hayer =

French lawyer and politician (born 1986)

Valérie Hayer MEP
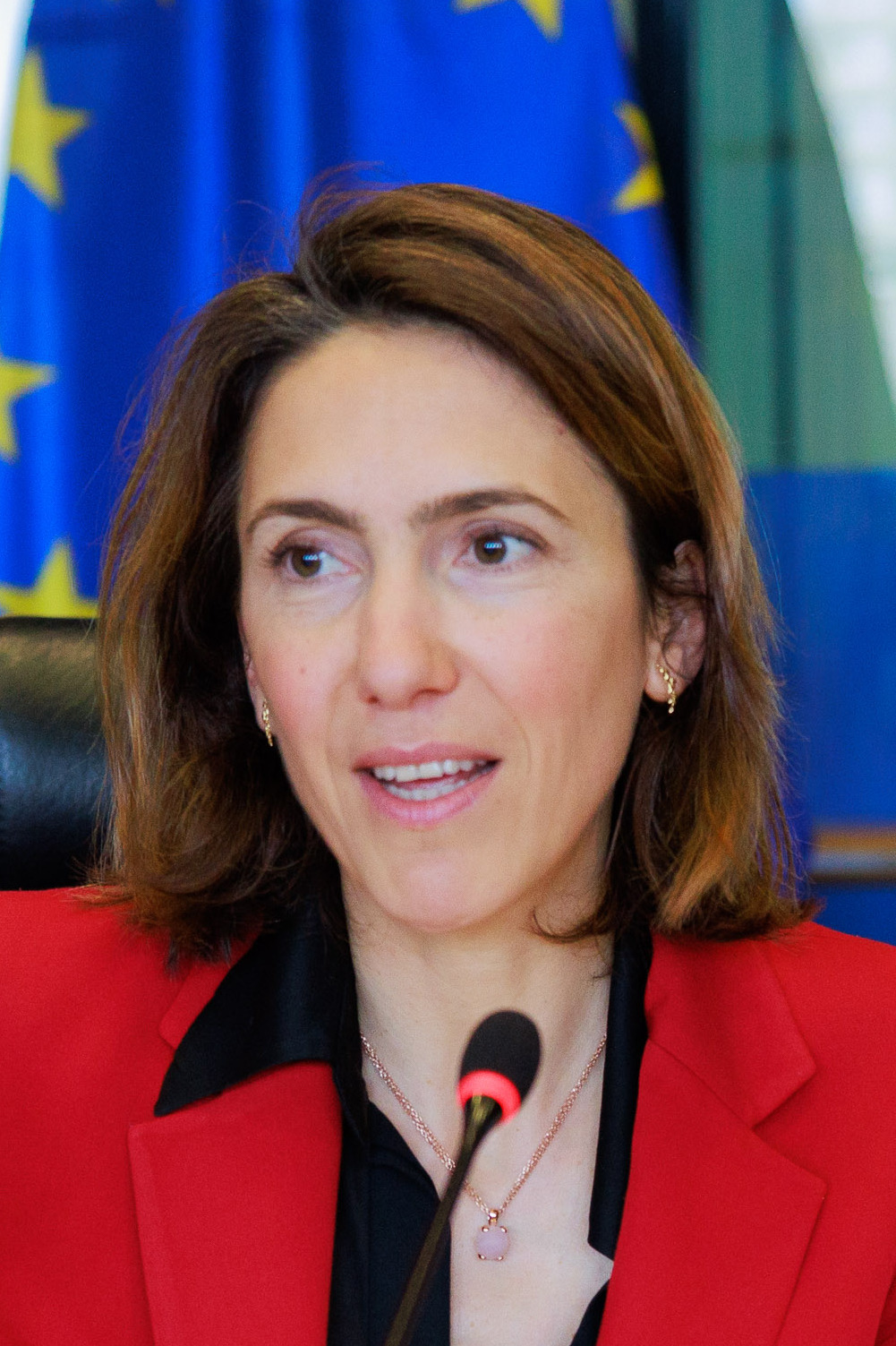
- Hayer in 2024

Leader of Renew Europe
- Incumbent
- Assumed office 25 January 2024
- Preceded by: Stéphane Séjourné
- Parliamentary group: Renew Europe

Member of the European Parliament
- Incumbent
- Assumed office 2 July 2019
- Constituency: France

Departmental councillor of Mayenne for the canton of Château-Gontier-sur-Mayenne-1
- In office 2 April 2015 – 27 June 2021
- Preceded by: New seat
- Succeeded by: Dominique de Valicourt

Municipal councillor of Saint-Denis-d'Anjou
- In office 21 March 2008 – 1 July 2019

Personal details
- Born: 6 April 1986 (age 40) Château-Gontier, France
- Party: Renaissance (since 2017)
- Other political affiliations: AC-UDI (2015–2017)
- Education: University of Angers; Paris 1 Panthéon-Sorbonne University

Valérie Hayer (French pronunciation: [valeʁi ɛje]; born 6 April 1986) is a French jurist and politician who has been serving as a Member of the European Parliament (MEP) since 2019 in the Renew Europe. Since 2024, she has been leading the Renew Europe group in parliament. She is a member of Renaissance (RE, formerly La République En Marche!), which she joined in 2017 following her departure from the Union of Democrats and Independents (UDI).

== Early life ==
Hayer is the daughter of dairy farmers from La Mayenne in northwestern France.

== Early career ==
Hayer worked as a parliamentary assistant for several members of the Senate of France, including Pierre Jarlier of the Union of Democrats and Independents (UDI) and then of LREM, and then for the MEP Jean Arthuis.

== Political career ==
=== Member of the European Parliament ===
In the European Parliament, Hayer has served on the Committee on Budgets. She is also her parliamentary group's coordinator on the committee. In 2020, she served as the Parliament's co-rapporteur (alongside José Manuel Fernandes) on a successful motion to assign new tax revenues to the budget of the European Union to repay its joint borrowing of 750 billion euros ($888 billion) for economic recovery after the COVID-19 pandemic. She is also part of the Parliament's negotiating team for the long-term EU budget (MFF) and own resources reform.

In addition to her committee assignments, Hayer is part of the Parliament's delegation for relations with the countries of Southeast Asia and the Association of Southeast Asian Nations (ASEAN). She is also a member of the European Internet Forum, the European Parliament Intergroup on Artificial Intelligence and Digital, the European Parliament Intergroup on LGBT Rights and the MEPs Against Cancer group.

In October 2021, Hayer and Marie-Pierre Vedrenne were appointed as co-chairs of President Emmanuel Macron's Renaissance electoral list in the European Parliament, replacing Stéphane Séjourné.

Hayer is also the president of the Association for European Revival, which is financed by LREM.

=== Renew Europe leadership, 2024–present ===
In January 2024, Hayer was elected to succeed Séjourné as leader of Renew Europe, then the parliament’s third-largest political grouping. At 37 years, she became the youngest-ever liberal parliamentary leader as well as the first female one since Simone Veil. On 29 February 2024, Hayer confirmed being named head of the “Need for Europe” list of the presidential majority for the 2024 European elections.

In the June 2024 European Parliament election, Hayer led the Ensemble (political coalition) formed by Emmanuel Macron as part of Renaissance (French political party) to a second-place finish, with 14.86% of the French national votes.

== Political positions ==
=== Foreign policy ===
In March 2024, Hayer criticized Marine Le Pen and Viktor Orban for their relationships with Russian president Vladimir Putin, accusing them of appeasement. During the 2024 State visits by Xi Jinping to France, Serbia and Hungary, she stated that the persecution of Uyghurs in China could be considered genocide and that Europe had been "too naive" in its relations with China.

In June 2026 Hayer opted for the EU to be more indulgent with its accession rules in an opinion piece with the Guardian. She stated that the EU cannot run efficiently on the principle of unanimity, which allows one country to veto decisions for whole Union. In the case of Iceland she opted to ease the Common Fisheries Policy to win the country as a member of the European Union.

=== Conflicts over Hungary ===
In July 2024 Hayer attacked the Hungarian Prime Minister, Viktor Orbán, because he went to the Kremlin to talk to the Russian president, Vladimir Putin, to finish the war in Ukraine. Hayer, the leader of the liberal Renew Europe group called on the European Council to examine all means to stop Hungary's rotating EU presidency.
