= Anne-Marie Schaffner =

French politician (born 1945)

Anne-Marie Schaffner MEP

Member of the European Parliament for France
- In office 1999–2004

National Secretary of Rally for the Republic
- In office 1995–1997

Personal details
- Born: 31 May 1945 (age 80)
- Party: Rally for the Republic; Union for a Popular Movement

Anne-Marie Schaffner (born 31 May 1945) is a former French politician and member of the European Parliament from 1994 to 1999 and again from 2002 to 2004. She was also National Secretary of Rally for the Republic from 1995 to 1997.

She was first elected in 1994 for Rally for the Republic (RPR), being 15th on the joint RPR-UDF list.

In the Parliament, she was a member of the committees on Petitions, Legal Affairs, and Civil Liberties and Internal Affairs. She notably prepared the Civil Liberties Committee report on the progress of the European Monitoring Centre for Drugs and Drug Addiction in 1998.

In the 2004 election, she was placed sixth on the UMP list in the Île-de-France constituency; she said this made it "impossible" for her to be re-elected.
