= Marie-Pierre Vedrenne =

French lawyer and politician (born 1982)

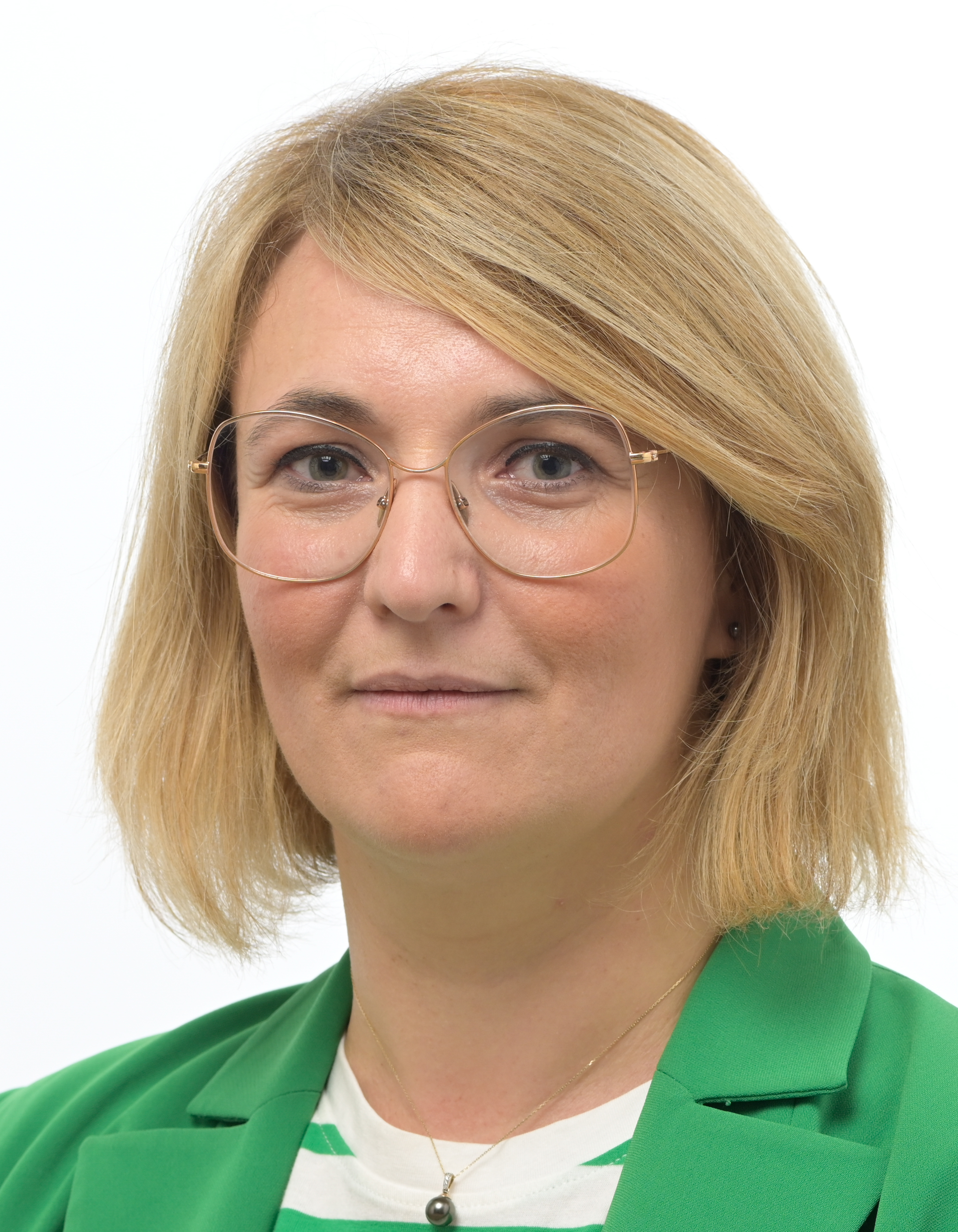

Minister Delegate to the Minister of the Interior
- Incumbent
- Assumed office 12 October 2025
- Prime Minister: Sébastien Lecornu

Member of the European Parliament for France
- In office 2 July 2019 – 12 October 2025

Personal details
- Born: 13 December 1982 (age 43) Limoges, France
- Party: Democratic Movement
- Education: University of Rennes 1

Marie-Pierre Vedrenne (born 13 December 1982) is a French lawyer and politician of the Democratic Movement (MoDem) who has served as Minister Delegate to Minister of the Interior in the second Lecornu government since 2025. She was previously a Member of the European Parliament from 2019 to 2025.

== Political career ==
Vedrenne was born on 13 December 1982 in Limoges. In parliament, she served as vice-chair of the Committee on International Trade and a member of the Committee on Petitions from 2019.

In addition to her committee assignments, Vedrenne was part of the European Parliament Intergroup on Children’s Rights, the European Parliament Intergroup on Climate Change, Biodiversity and Sustainable Development, the European Parliament Intergroup on Seas, Rivers, Islands and Coastal Areas, the MEPs Against Cancer group and the Spinelli Group.

In October 2021, Vedrenne and Valérie Hayer were appointed as co-chairs of President Emmanuel Macron's "Renaissance" electoral list in the European Parliament, replacing Stéphane Séjourné; since 2024, she has been the sole leader of the Renaissance members within the Renew Europe group.

Vedrenne was re-elected as an MEP in 2024.

== Other activities ==
- French Institute for International and Strategic Affairs (IRIS), Member of the Board of Directors
