= Danielle de March-Ronco =

French politician

Danielle de March-Ronco (born 6 August 1939 in Lérouville) is a French politician and communist, who formerly served as vice-president of the European Parliament.

== Biography ==
de March is the daughter of a stonemason and an office worker. After earning her national diploma, she worked for the URSSAF.

She became active in politics and trade unionism as a member of the General Confederation of Labour and the French Communist Party. In 1979, she was elected to the European Parliament with the Communist Party. She would be named vice-president of the legislature during her first mandate. She was re-elected in 1984, and would continue to serve as an MEP until 1989.

In 1979, she was the only woman to sit on the Var council. She was also elected a city councillor in Toulon in 1989 and 1995.

In February 2004, she became president of the Amicale des vétérans communistes varois.

== Bibliography ==
- Cet homme face au soleil, Manugraph, 2005
- Les mots de flamme, Transbordeurs, 2008
- L’empreinte des saisons, Éditions du Losange, 2011
- Les cahiers de Nina, Éditions du Losange, 2015
- Mon Toulon, nos résistances, Éditions du Losange, 2017
