= 1984 European Parliament election in France =

← 1979	17 June 1984	1989 →
- All 81 French seats in the European Parliament
Party	Leader	Vote %	Seats	+/–
UDF–RPR	Simone Veil	43.03	41	+1
PS	Lionel Jospin	20.76	20	0
PCF	Georges Marchais	11.21	10	−9
FN	Jean-Marie Le Pen	10.95	10	New
This lists parties that won seats. See the complete results below.

European Parliament elections were held in France on 17 June 1984. Four parties were able to win seats: an alliance of the centre right Union for French Democracy and the Gaullist Rally for the Republic, the Socialist Party and the French Communist Party, and the Front National. 56.7% of the French population turned out on election day.

The result was the first time the far-right Front National obtained important results – this time 10.8% and close to the declining French Communist Party. Jonah Birch argues in Jacobin that the FN's rise in popularity was caused by the Socialists abandoning their Keynesian platform the previous year and instead pursuing policies of austerity.

== Results ==
Party	Votes	%	Seats	+/–
Union for French Democracy–Rally for the Republic	8,683,596	43.03	41	+1
Socialist Party	4,188,875	20.76	20	–2
French Communist Party	2,261,312	11.21	10	–9
National Front	2,210,334	10.95	10	New
The Greens	680,080	3.37	0	0
MRG–Ecologists–UCR	670,474	3.32	0	–2
Lutte Ouvrière	417,702	2.07	0	0
Succeed in Europe	382,404	1.89	0	New
Internationalist Communist Party	182,320	0.90	0	New
PSU–CDU	146,238	0.72	0	0
Union of Independent Workers for Freedom of Enterprise	138,220	0.68	0	New
Initiative 84	123,642	0.61	0	New
For a United States of Europe	78,234	0.39	0	New
European Workers' Party	17,503	0.09	0	New
Total	20,180,934	100.00	81	0
Valid votes	20,180,934	96.47		
Invalid/blank votes	737,838	3.53		
Total votes	20,918,772	100.00		
Registered voters/turnout	36,880,688	56.72		
Source: France Politique
