= Franck Lepage =

French activist

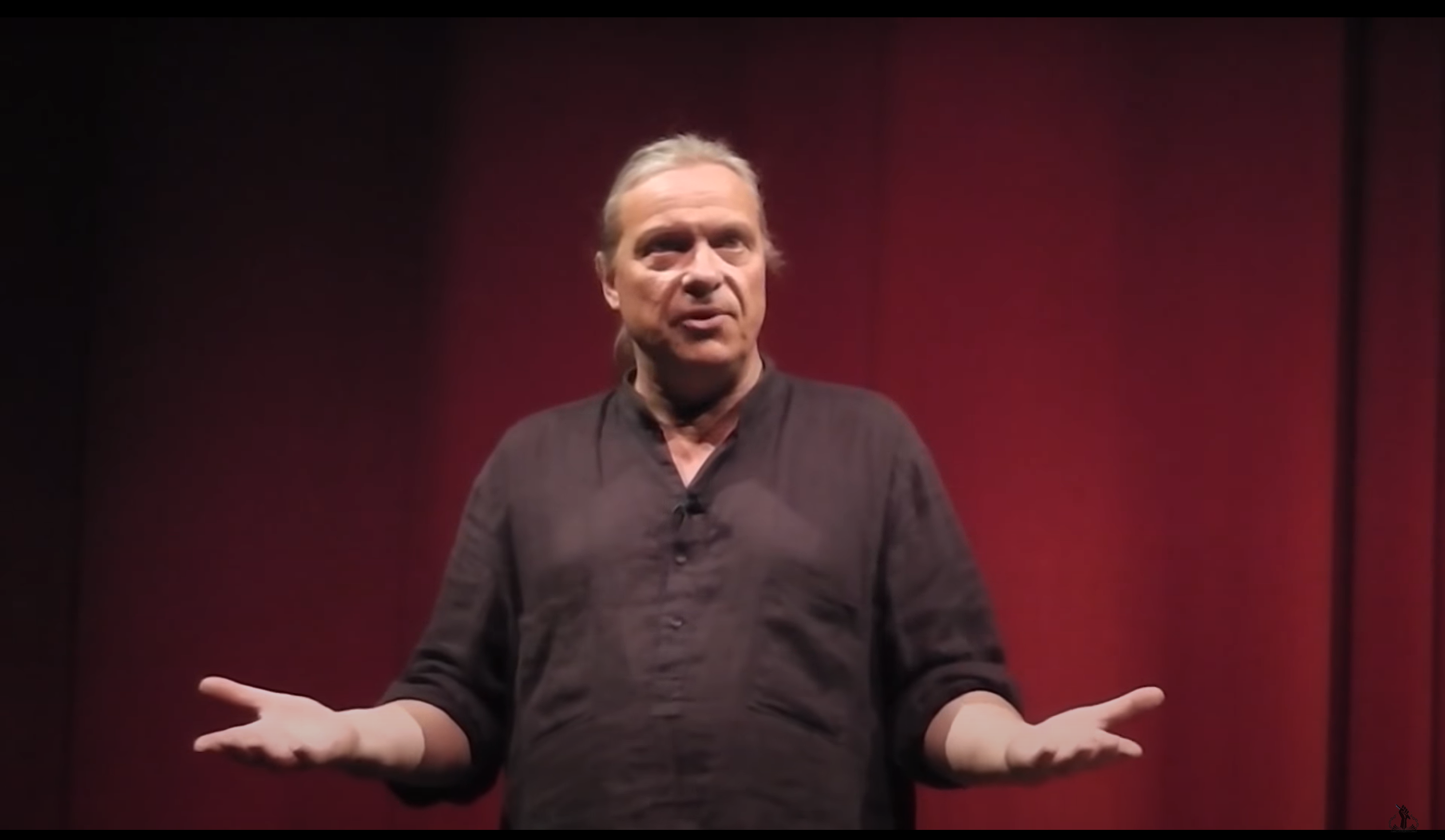
Franck Lepage

Franck Lepage is one of the founders of Workers' co-operative of popular education 'Le Pavé' (self-disbanded in 2014) in France. Franck was an activist of popular education, until 2000 director of programs at the French Federation of Youth and Culture Centers and associate research fellow at the National Institute of Youth and Popular Education.

He criticises the role of Culture and Arts in French society in a conference called "Inculture(s) 1 – L'éducation populaire, monsieur, ils n'en ont pas voulu…" (Inculture(s) 1 – Popular Education, Sir, they did not want any of it...)- He also played on stage in a "conférence gesticulée" (a new concept of gesticulate conference), that became more and more popular from 2006 to 2014.

In 2010, under the same format as one-man-shows, Franck Lepage started "Inculture(s) – 2", in which he touches on teaching, and then on social protection in "Inculture(s) − 5" with Gaël Tanguy, based on the theoretical work of Bernard Friot. With the developing network of Workers' co-operatives of Popular Education, especially 'La Grenaille', Le Pavé of Rennes, L'orage of Grenoble, Le vent debout of Toulouse and L'engrenage of Tours, he contributes to creating other gesticulate conferences. About a hundred conferences are then created by the end of 2014.

The self-disbandment of Le Pavé in December 2014, lead Lepage to co-found a new structure of political popular education "L'Ardeur" (Blazing Heat) created in 2015 with a new group of radicalist gesticulating conference folks. It focused on Trade Unionism, and brought on many new conferences and the creation of activist workshops.

== Biography ==
Born in Paris on the 17th November 1954, he studied at Sciences Po, but failed to get into the second year. He then took up Oriental Languages and Law, and turned to pedagogy.

As a teacher for youths with learning difficulties in Haute-Savoie in 1974, he discovers entertainment in 1975 and joins the department of Social and Cultural Activities and Science of Education at the Centre universitaire expérimental de Vincennes — a free and open University in Vincennes (Paris 8) — in 1977. There entertainment is presented as a way to "call into question capitalism's institutions".

He then stopped teaching to take up theatre in 1980, at l'université de Paris 8 (Vincennes in Saint-Denis). He founded his own theatre company in 1985. Then he joined the Fédération française des Maisons des jeunes et de la culture in 1987 and for the first time he hears about popular education, without anybody being able to explain to him the concept.

It is in that moment, by trying to take up the cultural and social problems of the Youth and the Culture of Centres to the Culture and Arts Ministry, that he realises the violence of the symbolic division of culture and social affairs in France. He then, with help from others, put a theory in place and a definition of what is Popular Education. He writes a report years later in 1994 to the Education Ministry about the importance of this subject. Not much is done by the Education Ministry, that is why he went on to create his own Popular Education Network.

In 2007, foundation with five other members of la SCOP d'éducation populaire et transformation sociale Le Pavé.

In 2012, he defines himself as a political activist: "I am a political activist, not an artist. […] Artist, is a social status. But the system refuse to see me as an activist". "I'm a "French comedian". Art and Culture destroy Politics.

He quits SCOP Le Pavé in April 2012 in order to fully train people of the networks, especially with La Grenaille.

== Publications ==
- Report on popular education or labour in Culture in the Political and Social transformation context, 2000, Ministry report for Marie-George Buffet (then Minister of Youth Affairs and Sports (France)).
- "From Popular Education to the Enslavement by "Culture & Arts", Le Monde diplomatique, mai 2009
- Popular Education, A Utopia to become, éd. Les Liens qui libèrent, 2012

== Bibliography ==
- 2007 : Incultures – Tome 1, L'éducation populaire, monsieur, ils n'en ont pas voulu… ou Une autre histoire de la culture, Cerisier (éditeur) ISBN 978-2-87267-109-0
- Participation au Livre noir de l'animation socioculturelle, Éditions L'Harmattan, 2005
- Participation à l'ouvrage collectif Altergouvernement, paru aux éditions Le Muscadier, 2012: Franck Lepage s'y incarne en ministre de la Culture de l'Altergouvernement, un gouvernement fictif composé de 18 citoyens, non politiciens de métier, chacun reconnu pour son engagement dans son domaine.
