= Technical Group of Independents (1999–2001) =

Technical Group of Independents (99-01)
- European Parliament group
- Name: Technical Group of Independents
- English abbr.: TGI
- French abbr.: TDI
- Formal name: Technical Group of Independent Members – mixed group
- Ideology: Heterogeneous
- From: 20 July 1999 (version 1); 1 December 1999 (version 2)
- To: 14 September 1999 (version 1); 4 October 2001 (version 2)
- Preceded by: n/a
- Succeeded by: n/a
- Chaired by: Gianfranco Dell'alba, Francesco Speroni,
- MEP(s): 18 (23 July 1999)

The Technical Group of Independent Members was a heterogeneous political technical group with seats in the European Parliament between 1999 and 2001. Unlike other political groups of the European Parliament, it did not have a coherent political complexion. Its existence prompted a five-year examination of whether mixed Groups were compatible with the Parliament. After multiple appeals to the European Court of First Instance (now known as the General Court) and the European Court of Justice, the question was finally answered: overtly mixed Groups would not be allowed.

== History ==
=== Creation of TGI ===
MEPs in the European Parliament form themselves into Groups along ideological, not national, lines. Each Group is assumed to have a common set of political principles, (known as a common "affinity", or "complexion"), and each Group thus formed is granted benefits. This puts MEPs who cannot form themselves into Groups at a disadvantage. In the Parliament's past, they got around this by forming Groups with only tenuous common ground, and Parliament turned a blind eye. But the crunch point arrived on 20 July 1999, when a Group called TGI (TDI in French, from technique des deputés indépendants) was formed. The Group consisted of the spectacularly unlikely partnership of the far-right French Front National, the regionalist-separatist Lega Nord of Italy, and liberal Italian Bonino List. Further, the 19 July letter ("constituent declaration") setting up the Group emphasised the political independence of the Group members from each other:

The various signatory members assert that they are politically entirely independent of each other...

At the plenary sitting of 20 July 1999 the President of Parliament announced that the TGI Group had been set up.

=== Objections to its creation ===
Believing that the conditions laid down by the Rules of Procedure of the European Parliament for establishing Groups had not been met, the leaders of the other Groups called for the Committee on Constitutional Affairs to give an interpretation. The Committee on Constitutional Affairs ruled that the constituent declaration broke Rule 29(1), stating that:

The creation of a group which openly rejects any political character and all political affiliation between its Members is not acceptable...

=== First dissolution ===
Parliament was notified on 13 September 1999 of the ruling. TGI members made two proposals to amend the Rules of Procedure and allow mixed Groups to be formed, (one of which was signed by 68 other members), but the next day Parliament adopted (412 to 56 with 36 abstentions) the Committee on Constitutional Affairs's interpretation of Rule 29, forcibly dissolving the Group ("the act of 14 September 1999"), and making 13 September 1999 the last day of the Group's existence.

=== Appeals to the Court of First Instance ===
On 5 October 1999, Jean-Claude Martinez MEP and Charles de Gaulle MEP lodged two appeals with the Court of First Instance. The first one (Case T-222/99R) was based on Article 242 of the EC Treaty and was intended to suspend the enforcement of the act of 14 September 1999. The second one (Case T-222/99) was based on Article 230 of the EC Treaty and was intended to annul the act of 14 September 1999.

The first appeal (Case T-222/99R) was upheld, and the act of 14 September 1999 was suspended by the Court of First Instance on 25 November 1999.

=== Resurrection ===
The Group was temporarily resurrected on December 1, 1999 until the Court came to a decision on the second appeal. The Budget for the year was somewhat advanced, but the Committee on Budgets managed to come up with the money to give TGI the secretarial allowances and 14 temporary posts that a Group of its size was entitled to.

=== Court of First Instance rejects the appeals ===
Meanwhile the second appeal (Case T-222/99) had been joined by two others, one (Case T-327/99) from the Front National as a corporate entity, the other (T-329/99) from the Bonino List as a corporate entity and from Emma Bonino, Marco Pannella, Marco Cappato, Gianfranco Dell’Alba, Benedetto Della Vedova, Olivier Dupuis and Maurizio Turco as individuals.

On 2 October 2001, the Court of First Instance delivered its verdict (2002/C 17/20). It found that Article 230 of the EC Treaty did not contradict the act of 14 September 1999. It joined together the three appeals, dismissed them, and ordered the applicants to pay costs.

=== Second dissolution ===
President Fontaine announced that the Court of First Instance had declared against the appeal and that the disbandment was back in effect from October 2, 2001, the date of the declaration. TGI appeared on the list of Political Groups in the European Parliament for the last time on October 4, 2001.

=== Appeals to the European Court of Justice ===
On 11 October 2001, Gianfranco Dell'Alba on behalf of TGI announced that they would appeal the Court of First Instance's decision to the European Court of Justice. In the event, two appeals were lodged with the ECJ: one (Case C-486/01 P) from the Front National as a corporate entity on 17 December 2001, the other (Case C-488/01 P) from Jean-Claude Martinez as an individual on 11 December 2001.

=== European Court of Justice rejects the appeals ===
The Martinez appeal was thrown out (2004/C 59/03) and the applicant ordered to pay costs on November 11, 2003. The Front National appeal dragged out for another six months, but in the end it was also thrown out (2004/C 217/01) and the applicant ordered to pay costs on 29 June 2004.

=== Final result ===
After five years and several appeals to the Court of First Instance and the Court of Justice, the principle was settled: mixed Groups would not be allowed to exist.

== Consequences ==
Whilst the Parliament and Courts concerned themselves with the existence of TGI, the Committee on Constitutional Affairs examined the implications of mixed Groups and the wider issue of political Groups per se.

=== Rationale for Groups ===
During their deliberations in December 1999, the Committee on Constitutional Affairs laid down the rationale for the existence of Groups:

Most Parliaments, for obvious reasons of rationalising their work, limit the scope for individual members to act singly. A balance must be struck between the rights of individual members and the need to ensure that the parliament can work effectively...The specific role given to political groups in this overall balance of rights and responsibilities is based on the fact that they bring together members according to their political affinity. They are therefore able to mandate members to speak on their behalf, table amendments and represent them in the Conference of Presidents. This is an important rationalisation of Parliament’s work. Instead of 626 individual members all tabling their own texts, amendments and so on and all wishing to speak on every issue, the Group system allows speakers, motions, amendments etc. to be tabled on behalf of a large number of like minded members. A ‘Technical’ or ‘Mixed’ Group with no political affinity would not be able to operate in this way. On whose behalf would amendments be tabled, for instance, or motions proposed? If the members of the Group have no political affinity whatsoever, then the rights exercised ‘in the name of the Group’ would in fact be exercised on behalf of individual components of the Group (either single members or parties within the Group), thereby giving such components rights not enjoyed by comparable components of other groups.

=== Changes to the Rules of Procedure ===
In August 2003, the Committee recommended changes to the Rules of Procedure which would establish the benefits and funding to be provided to the Groups, and similarly those for the Non-Inscrits (the ungrouped members). These changes were later implemented.

=== Situation in February 2008 ===
As of February 2008, the Parliament's Rules of Procedure formulate the requirement for Groups to have a common political affinity (Rule 29), define Groups as bodies that are part of the European Union (Rule 30), establish benefits available to the Groups (Rule 30) and Non-Inscrits (Rule 31), and who decides what positions each Group gets (Rule 32).

The requirement for a common affinity is on a "don't ask, don't tell" basis: the Groups are assumed to have one by virtue of their existence and provided they do not obviously act in a manner contrary to that assumption, the Parliament will not enquire too closely. If the Group members do deny their common affinity, then the Group may be challenged and dissolved. The exact wording of Rule 29, part 1 is:

Members may form themselves into groups according to their political affinities. Parliament need not normally evaluate the political affinity of members of a group. In forming a group together under this Rule, Members concerned accept by definition that they have political affinity. Only when this is denied by the Members concerned is it necessary for Parliament to evaluate whether the group has been constituted in conformity with the Rules.

These requirements had implications for the formulation of the far-right Group called "Identity, Tradition, Sovereignty" in 2007.

== Member Parties at 23 July 1999 ==
The Group was founded on July 20 with 29 members, but nine members (Angelilli, Berlato, Fini, Musumeci, Muscardini, Nobilia, Poli Bortone, Segni and Turchi) left on July 21 and two members (Atxalandabaso and Formentini) left on July 22, leaving a membership of 18 by July 23.

Member state	MEPs	Party	MEPs	Notes
France	5	Front National	5	Bruno Gollnisch, Carl Lang, Charles De Gaulle, Jean-Claude Martinez, Jean-Marie Le Pen
Belgium	2	Vlaams Blok	2	Frank Vanhecke, Karel C.C. Dillen
Italy	11	Bonino List	7	Benedetto Della Vedova, Emma Bonino, Gianfranco Dell'alba, Marco Cappato, Marco Pannella, Maurizio Turco, Olivier Dupuis
Italy	11	Lega Nord	3	Francesco Enrico Speroni, Umberto Bossi, Gian Paolo Gobbo
Italy	11	Tricolour Flame	1	Roberto Felice Bigliardo

== Sources ==
- Department of Economics, University of California, Berkeley
- Konrad-Adenauer-Stiftung
- European Parliament
- EUR-Lex
- International Political Science Review
- The Court of Justice of the European Communities
- European Parliament archive of MEPs
