= Catherine Guy-Quint =

French politician and Member of the European Parliament (born 1949)

Catherine Guy-Quint (born 1 September 1949 in Poitiers, Vienne) is a French politician and Member of the European Parliament for central France. She is a member of the Socialist Party, which is part of the Party of European Socialists, and sits on the Committee on Budgets.

She is also chair of the delegation to the EU–Bulgaria Joint Parliamentary Committee, a substitute for the Committee on Economic and Monetary Affairs, and a member of the temporary committee on policy challenges and budgetary means of the enlarged Union 2007–2013.

== Education ==
- Diploma of higher studies of environment/water treatment (Poitiers, 1971).
- University diploma of management (Clermont-Ferrand, 1982).
- Teaching (1971–1972), member of various (1973–1992) and management engineering and design departments of companies

== Career ==
- Teacher (1971–1972)
- Member of various construction project planning consultancies (1973–1992)
- Manager of a construction company (1986–1992)
- Training adviser on construction and civil engineering (1986–1990)

== Local mandates ==
- Member of the municipal council of Cournon-d'Auvergne (1982–1989)
- Mayor of Cournon-d'Auvergne (1989–2001)
- Regional adviser (1998–1999).
- President of the local Mission for the employment of the young people of Cournon (1990–2002)
- General adviser of the department of Puy de Dôme (1996–1998)
- Vice-president of the agglomeration Clermont, Oise (2000–2002)
- Member of the regional council (1998–1999)
- Mayor of Cournon-d'Auvergne (1989–1999).

== National and European mandates ==
- Member of the Socialist Party national council (1990–2003)
- Member of the Socialist Party national bureau (1997–1999)
- Associated secretary-general of the office of the Ministry of Foreign Affairs (1997–2001)
- Member of the National Council of the local Missions (2002)
- Member of the Fonds Intervention Commerce et Artisanat (FISAC) (1992–2001)
- Member of the national council (1990–1999) and the national office of the Socialist Party (1997–1999).
- Member of the office of the socialist and republican elected officials (1990–2001)
- Vice-president of the European Association of the elected officials of mountain
- Member of the European Parliament (since 1999)

== Decorations ==
- Honorary mayor of Cournon-d'Auvergne
- Chevalier of the Ordre National du Mérite
