= 1989 European Parliament election in France =

← 1984	15 June 1989	1994 →
- All 81 French seats in the European Parliament
Party	Leader	Vote %	Seats	+/–
UDF–RPR	Valéry Giscard d’Estaing	28.88%	26	−15
PS	Laurent Fabius	23.61%	22	+2
FN	Jean-Marie Le Pen	11.73	10	0
LV	Antoine Waechter	10.59	9	+9
LCE	Simone Veil	8.43	7	New
PCF	Philippe Herzog	7.72	7	−3
This lists parties that won seats. See the complete results below.

European Parliament elections were held in France on 15 June 1989. Six lists were able to win seats: an alliance of the centre right Union for French Democracy and the Gaullist Rally for the Republic, an alliance of the Socialist Party and the Parti Radical de Gauche, The Greens, the French Communist Party, the Front National and a list of dissenting members of the Union for French Democracy. 48.8% of the French population turned out on election day.

== Results ==
Party	Votes	%	Seats	+/–
Union for French Democracy–Rally for the Republic	5,242,038	28.88	26	–15
Socialist Party	4,286,354	23.61	22	+2
National Front	2,129,668	11.73	10	0
The Greens	1,922,945	10.59	9	+9
The Centre for Europe	1,529,346	8.43	7	New
French Communist Party	1,401,171	7.72	7	–3
Hunting, Fishing, Nature, Traditions	749,741	4.13	0	New
Lutte Ouvrière	258,663	1.43	0	0
Apolitical List for the Protection of Animals and their Environment	188,573	1.04	0	0
The Alliance	136,230	0.75	0	New
Movement for a Workers' Party	109,523	0.60	0	New
Europe Renovators	74,327	0.41	0	New
Generation Europe	58,995	0.33	0	New
European Workers' Party	32,295	0.18	0	0
Initiative for a European Democracy	31,547	0.17	0	New
Total	18,151,416	100.00	81	0
Valid votes	18,151,416	97.11		
Invalid/blank votes	539,276	2.89		
Total votes	18,690,692	100.00		
Registered voters/turnout	38,297,496	48.80		
Source: France Politique
