= Bernard Castagnède =

French politician

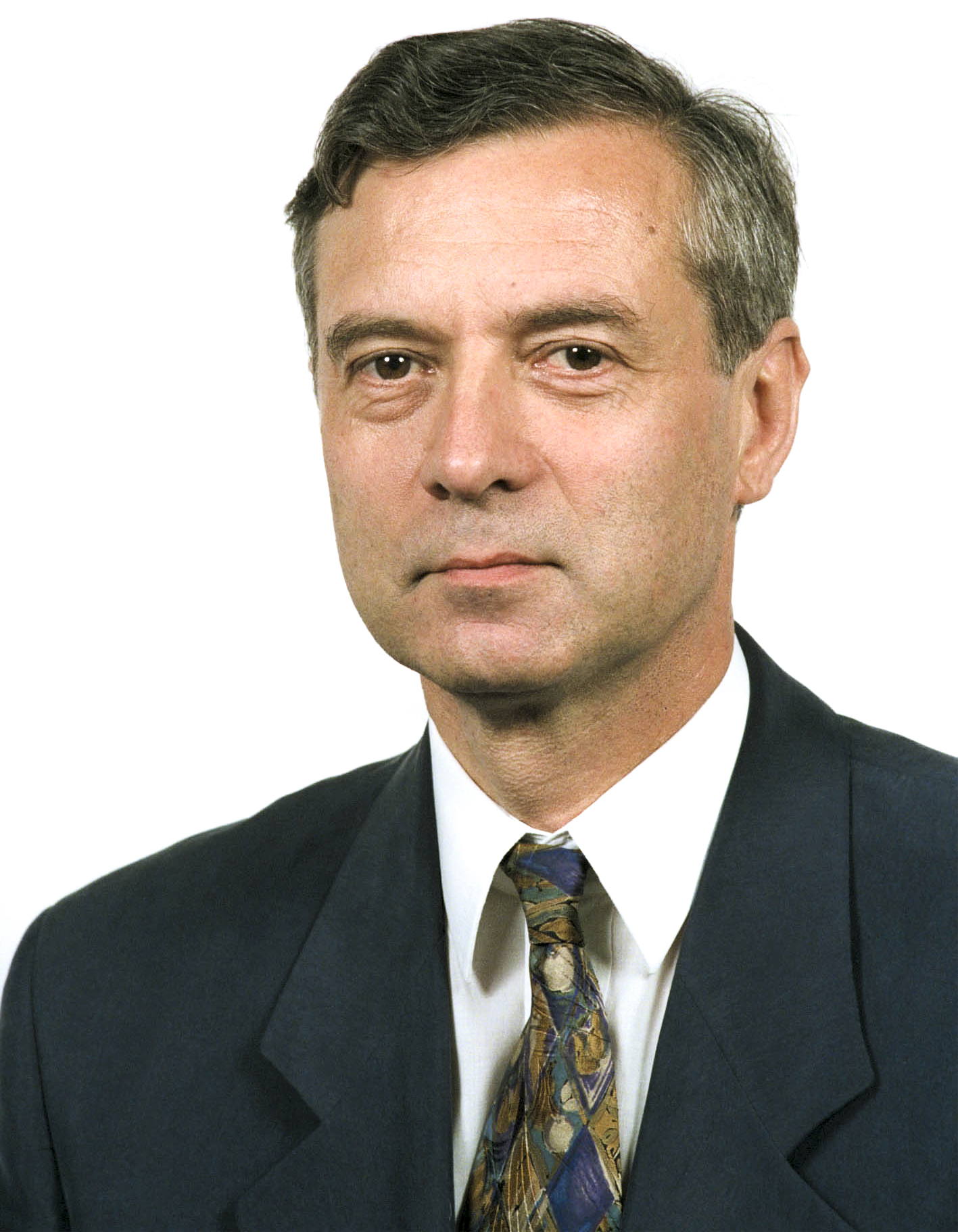
- Castagnède in 1994

Member of the European Parliament for France
- In office 19 July 1994 – 19 July 1999

Personal details
- Born: 7 November 1944 (age 80); Caudéran, France
- Political party: Radical Party of the Left
- Occupation: Politician

Bernard Castagnède (French pronunciation: [bɛʁnaʁ kastaɲɛd]; born 7 November 1944) is a French politician who served as a Member of the European Parliament from the Radical Party of the Left between 1994 and 1999.
