= Europe Begins at Sarajevo =

Former anti-nationalist French political party

Europe Begins at Sarajevo (French: L'Europe commence à Sarajevo; Bosnian: Europa počinje kod Sarajeva) was a short-lived political party established in France to contest the 1994 European Parliament elections on a campaign of urging Western countries to intervene in favour of the Bosnian Muslims in the ongoing Bosnian War.

== History ==
Europe Begins at Sarajevo was established in France in 1994 in reaction to the Yugoslav Wars. It carried strong anti-nationalist and pan-European sentiments. The party was established under the direction of the French philosopher Bernard-Henri Lévy, who visited the front-lines in Sarajevo in 1992 and was disturbed by what he saw. Upon returning to Paris, he delivered a plea for aid from Alija Izetbegović, Chairman of the Presidency of Bosnia and Herzegovina, directly to the French President François Mitterrand. The letter may have helped to spur Mitterrand's surprise visit to Sarajevo in June 1992.

As the war continued, Lévy became increasingly frustrated with Mitterrand's refusal to lift the arms embargo on Bosnia and Herzegovina, and founded the party in protest. The party received significant media attention due to vocal supporters like André Glucksmann. Initial opinion polls showed the party polling at 12%, drawing votes from the centre left Parti Socialiste. However, shortly before the election, on 30 May, Levy announced that he was withdrawing from the race, claiming that he had achieved his goal of increasing awareness. In the final tally, the list only received 305,633 votes (1.57%).

== Legacy ==
The campaign in France inspired a similar initiative in Sweden, called “Sarajevo List”.
