= Thierry Jean-Pierre =

French judge and politician (1955–2005)

- Jean-Pierre in 1994

Member of the European Parliament
- In office 1994–2004

Personal details
- Born: 27 July 1955 Mende, France
- Died: 26 July 2005 (aged 49) France
- Party: Liberal Democracy; Movement for France
- Education: French National School for the Judiciary

Thierry Jean-Pierre (1955–2005) was a French judge and Member of the European Parliament (MEP).
