= Marie-Thérèse Hermange =

French politician (born 1947)

Marie-Thérèse Hermange (born 17 September 1947) is a French politician and a member of the Senate of France. She represents Paris and is a member of the Union for a Popular Movement Party. Suspected of treachery in favour of Laboratoires Servier, and tried for bribery in the Mediator affair in April 2013, she has been nonetheless elected a member of the Ethical Commission of the Académie de Médecine (2017) and exonerated for lack of evidence on March 29, 2021.
