= Sylviane Ainardi =

French politician (born 1947)

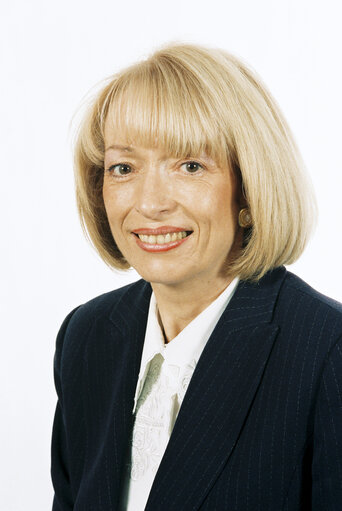

Member of the European Parliament
- In office 25 July 1989 – 19 July 2004
- Constituency: France

Personal details
- Born: 19 December 1947 (age 78) Ugine, Savoie, France
- Party: French Communist Party
- Occupation: Politician

Sylviane Ainardi is a French politician, who, from 1989 until 2004, was a Member of the European Parliament (MEP) representing France. She is a member of the French Communist Party.
