= André Laignel =

French politician

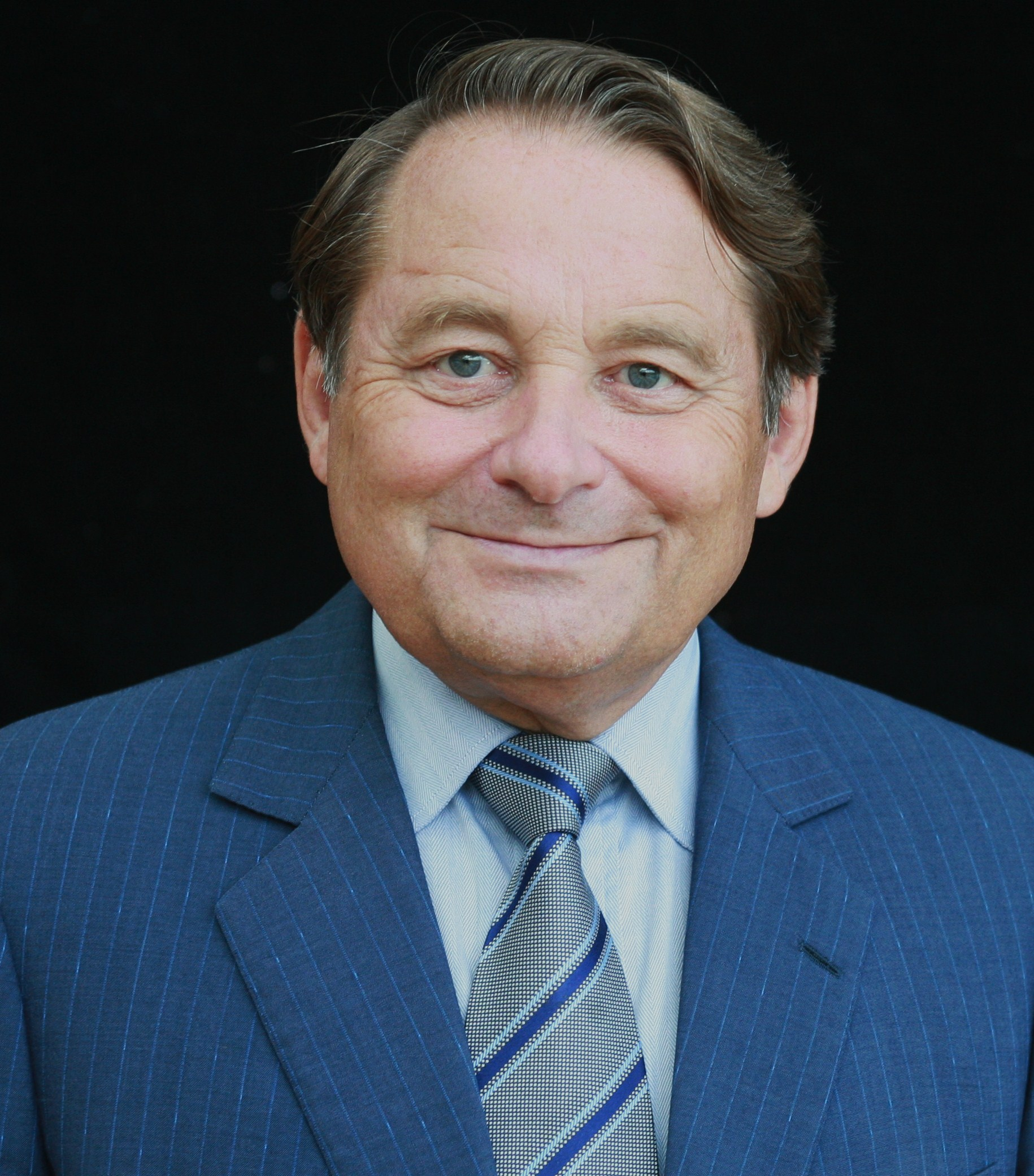
- André Laignel in 2006.

Mayor of Issoudun
- In office 25 March 1977 – 22 March 2026
- Preceded by: Maurice Rousselle
- Succeeded by: Julien Dubot

Personal details
- Born: 4 December 1942 (age 83) 14th Arrondissement, Paris
- Party: PS

André Laignel (French pronunciation: [ɑ̃dʁe lɛɲɛl]; born 4 December 1942 in Paris) is a French politician. of the Socialist Party (PS) who has been serving as the mayor of Issoudun (1977-2026), first delegated vice-president of the Association of French Mayors (AMF) and the President of the Committee of Local Finances (CFL).

== Political career ==
In July 2022, Laignel declared his candidacy of the Presidency of the National Agency for Territorial Cohesion (ANCT).

Ahead of the Socialist Party's 2017 primaries, Laignel publicly endorsed Benoît Hamon as the party's candidate for the presidential election later that year.
