= 1979 European Parliament election in France =

- 7–10 June 1979
- All 81 French seats in the European Parliament
Party	Leader	Vote %	Seats
UDF	Simone Veil	27.61	25
PS–MRG	François Mitterrand	23.53	22
PCF	Georges Marchais	20.52	19
RPR	Jacques Chirac	16.31	15
This lists parties that won seats. See the complete results below.

European Parliament elections were held in France for the first time on 10 June 1979. Four parties won seats: the centre right Union for French Democracy the Gaullist Rally for the Republic, the Socialist Party and the French Communist Party. Voter turnout was 61%.

== Results ==
Party	Votes	%	Seats
Union for French Democracy	5,588,851	27.61	25
Socialist Party–Movement of Radicals of the Left	4,763,026	23.53	22
French Communist Party	4,153,710	20.52	19
Rally for the Republic	3,301,980	16.31	15
Movement of Political Ecology	888,134	4.39	0
Lutte Ouvrière–Revolutionary Communist League	623,663	3.08	0
The Fifth List: Employment – Equality – Europe	373,259	1.84	0
UDIP – FIDES	283,144	1.40	0
Party of New Forces	265,911	1.31	0
Regions – Europe	337	0.00	0
Unified Socialist Party	332	0.00	0
Total	20,242,347	100.00	81
Valid votes	20,242,347	94.78	
Invalid/blank votes	1,114,613	5.22	
Total votes	21,356,960	100.00	
Registered voters/turnout	35,180,531	60.71	
Source: France Politique
