= Rally for the Republic =

Political party in France (1976–2002)

Rally for the Republic Rassemblement pour la République
- Abbreviation: RPR
- President: Michèle Alliot-Marie (last)
- Founder: Jacques Chirac
- Founded: 5 December 1976; 49 years ago
- Dissolved: 21 September 2002; 24 years ago
- Preceded by: Union of Democrats for the Republic
- Merged into: Union for a Popular Movement
- Ideology: Gaullism; Conservatism; Liberal conservatism; Right-wing populism; 1970s: Paternalistic conservatism
- Political position: Centre-right to right-wing
- European affiliation: European People's Party (1999–2002)
- European Parliament group: EPD (1976–84); EDA (1984–95); UFE (1995–99); EPP-ED (1999–2002)
- International affiliation: International Democrat Union
- Colours: Blue; White; Red

The Rally for the Republic (French: Rassemblement pour la République [ʁasɑ̃bləmɑ̃ puʁ la ʁepyblik]; RPR [ɛʁ pe ɛʁ]) was a Gaullist and conservative political party in France. Originating from the Union of Democrats for the Republic (UDR), it was founded by Jacques Chirac in 1976 and presented itself as the heir of Gaullist politics. It was one of the two major parties in French politics, alongside the Socialist Party. On 21 September 2002, the RPR was merged into the Union for the Presidential Majority, later renamed the Union for a Popular Movement (UMP).

== History ==
=== The defense of the Gaullist identity against President Giscard d'Estaing (1976–1981) ===
In 1974, the divisions in the Gaullist movement permitted the election of Valéry Giscard d'Estaing to the Presidency of the French Republic. Representing the pro-European and pseudo-Orleanist centre-right, he was the first non-Gaullist to become head of state since the beginning of the Fifth Republic in 1958. However, the Gaullist Party remained the main force in parliament and Jacques Chirac was appointed prime minister. Chirac resigned in August 1976 and in December 1976 the RPR was created in order to restore the Gaullist domination over the institutions of the French republic.

Though retaining its support for the president's government, the RPR criticized the executive duo composed of President Giscard d'Estaing and Prime Minister Raymond Barre. Its first master stroke was in March 1977 the election of Chirac as Mayor of Paris against Michel d'Ornano, a close friend of President Giscard d'Estaing. Nevertheless, it was faced with the creation of the Union for French Democracy (UDF), a confederation of the parties supporting the presidential policies and which competed for the leadership over the right. Consequently, the stake of the 1978 legislative election was not only the victory of the right over the left, but the domination of the RPR over the UDF in the parliamentary majority.

Given the increasing unpopularity of the executive duo, and with a view to the next presidential election, the RPR became increasingly critical. In December 1978, six months before the European Parliament election, the Call of Cochin signed by Chirac denounced the appropriation of France by "the foreign party," which sacrificed the national interests and the independence of the country in order to build a federal Europe. This accusation clearly targeted Giscard d'Estaing. RPR leaders contrasted this as coming from the social doctrine of Gaullism as opposed to a perceived liberalism on the part of the President.

As RPR candidate at the 1981 presidential election, Chirac formulated vigorous condemnations of President Giscard d'Estaing, who ran for a second term. Eliminated in the first round, Chirac refused to give an endorsement for the second round, though he did say privately that he would vote for Giscard d'Estaing. In fact, the RPR was expected to work for the defeat of the incumbent president.

The first logo of the RPR recalls the Gaullist inheritance with the Cross of Lorraine, symbol of the Free French, drawn on top of the phrygian cap (normally worn by Marianne).

=== Opposition to President Mitterrand and abandonment of Gaullist doctrine (1981–1995) ===
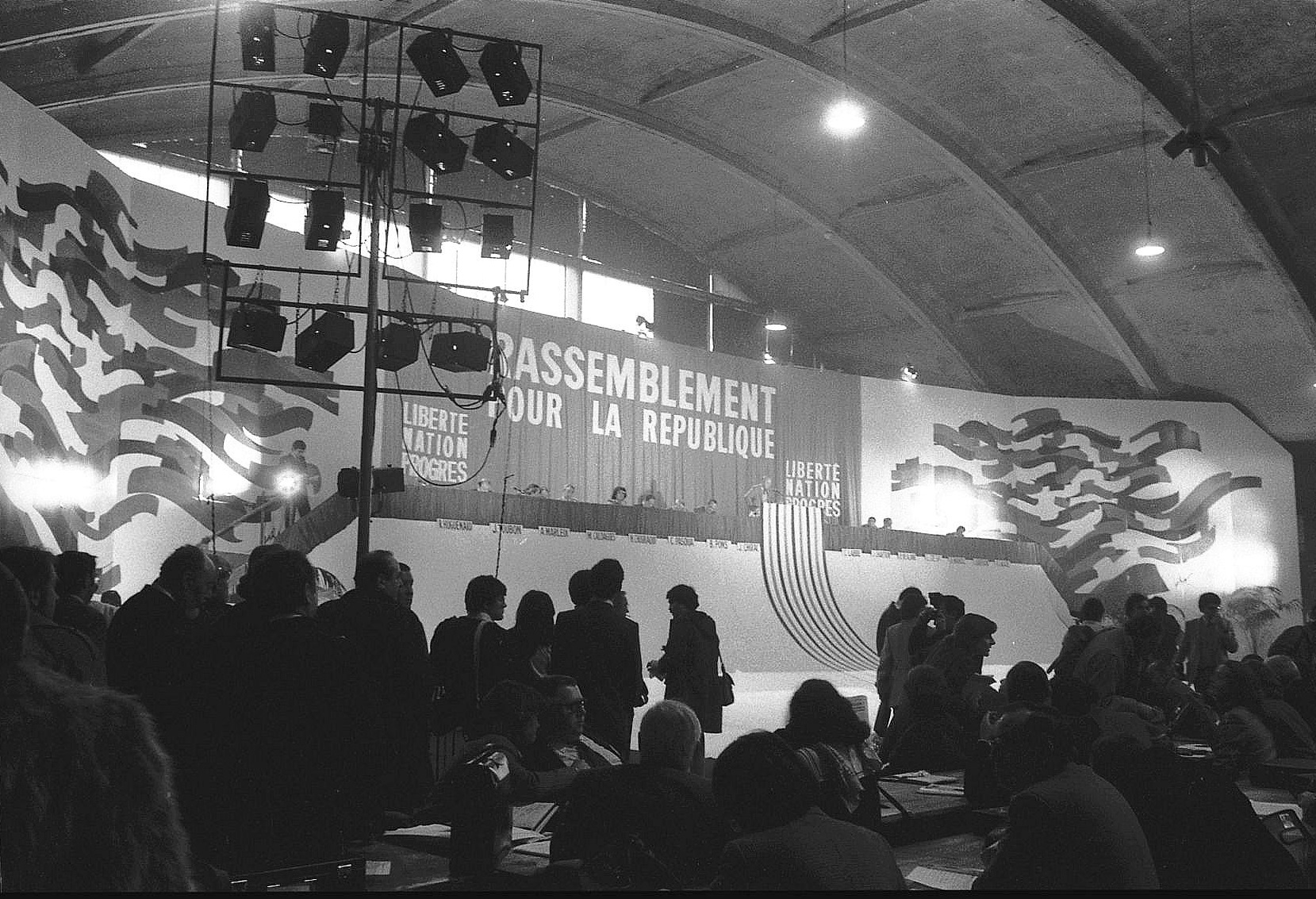
RPR meeting in 1982.

After 1981, the RPR opposed with energy the policy of the Socialist Party President François Mitterrand and the left-wing governments. The RPR denounced the plan of nationalizations as the setting up of a "collectivist society". Impressed by the electoral success of New Right conservatives led by Ronald Reagan in the United States of America and by Margaret Thatcher in the United Kingdom, it gradually abandoned the Gaullist doctrine, claiming less control of the state in the economy. During its 1983 congress, it advocated a liberal economic programme and the pursuit of the European construction, accepting the supranationality.

This new political line contributed to the reconciliation between the RPR and the UDF. In this, they presented a common list at the 1984 European Parliament election and a platform to prepare the winning 1986 legislative election. However, a rivalry appeared between Jacques Chirac and Raymond Barre who competed for the right-wing leadership with a view to the next presidential election. Furthermore, if the right-wing coalition benefited from the failures of the Socialist power, it was confronted with the emergence of the National Front in the far right. The RPR was divided about the possibility of alliance with this party.

In 1986, being the leader of the main party of the new parliamentary majority and accepting the principle of the "cohabitation" with President Mitterrand (contrary to Barre), Chirac became again prime minister. He led a liberal economic policy inspired by Anglo-Saxon examples, selling many public companies, and abolishing the wealth tax. His Interior Minister Charles Pasqua led a policy of restriction of immigration. If Chirac acceded in the second round of the 1988 presidential election despite Raymond Barre's candidacy, he was defeated by Mitterrand.

While the RPR returned in the opposition, the leadership of Chirac was challenged by younger politicians who wished to renew the right. Furthermore, the abandonment of the Gaullist doctrine was criticized by Charles Pasqua and Philippe Séguin. They tried to take him the RPR lead in 1990, in vain. However, the division re-appeared with the 1992 Maastricht referendum. Chirac voted "yes" whereas Séguin and Pasqua campaigned for "no".

The "Union for France", a RPR/UDF coalition, won the 1993 legislative election. Chirac refused to re-cohabitate with Mitterrand, and Edouard Balladur became prime minister. Balladur promised that he would not be a candidate at the 1995 presidential election. Nevertheless, polls indicated Balladur was the favorite in the presidential race and, furthermore, he was supported by most of the right-wing politicians. He decided finally to run against Chirac. However, they claimed that they remained friends for 30 years.

The Socialists being weakened after the 14 years of Mitterrand's presidency, the main competition was within the right, between Balladur and Chirac, two Neo-Gaullists. Balladur proposed a liberal program and took advantage of the "positive results" of his cabinet, whereas Chirac advocated Keynesian economics to reduce the "social fracture" and criticized the "dominant ideas", targeting Balladur. Chirac won the 1995 presidential election.

=== The RPR became the presidential party (1995–2002) ===
After his election as President of France, Jacques Chirac nominated Alain Juppé, "the best among us" according to him, as prime minister. But the majority of the personalities who had supported Balladur during the presidential campaign were excluded from the government. The balladuriens (such as Nicolas Sarkozy) were completely isolated in the party too.

In November 1995, Prime Minister Alain Juppé announced a plan to reform the French welfare state which sparked wide social conflict. The executive duo became very unpopular and some months later President Chirac dissolved the National Assembly. His supporters lost the 1997 legislative election. Consequently, he was forced to cohabitate with a left-wing cabinet led by Lionel Jospin until 2002.

Séguin succeeded to Juppé as RPR leader, but he criticized the ascendancy of President Chirac over the party. He resigned during the 1999 European campaign while Pasqua presented a dissident list to advocate the Gaullist idea of a "Europe of nations". Pasqua founded the Rally for France (RPF) and obtained more votes than the RPR official list led by Nicolas Sarkozy. Michèle Alliot-Marie, former Minister of Youth and sports, was elected RPR leader, against the will of President Chirac who supported covertly an unfamous candidate Jean-Paul Delevoye. Besides, the RPR was involved in many financing scandals. For instance, the party was suspected to pay its employees with the funds of Paris's municipality. The RPR lost the mayoralty of Paris in 2001, in aid of the left.

After the 1999 European elections, the RPR joined the European People's Party–European Democrats (EPP-ED) parliamentary group, and became a full member of the European People's Party (EPP) in December 2001.

Before the 2002 presidential election, both RPR and non-RPR supporters of Chirac gathered in an association: the "Union on the move". It became the Union for a Popular Movement (UMP) after the 21 April 2002 electoral shock. Chirac was re-elected and the new party won the legislative election.

Prior to its replacement by the UMP, the RPR had been increasingly embroiled in judicial proceedings following from the corruption scandals in the Paris region. Its former secretary-general Alain Juppé was sentenced in 2004 for a related felony. In 2007, a formal judicial investigation was opened against Jacques Chirac himself.

== Election results ==
=== Presidential ===
President of the French Republic
Election year	Candidate	1st round			2nd round			Result
Election year	Candidate	Votes	%	Rank	Votes	%	Rank	Result
1981	Jacques Chirac	5,225,848	18.00	3rd	—N/a			Lost
1988	Jacques Chirac	6,063,514	19.94	2nd	14,218,970	45.98	2nd	Lost
1995	Jacques Chirac	6,348,375	20.84	2nd	15,763,027	52.64	1st	Won
2002	Jacques Chirac	5,665,855	19.88	1st	25,537,956	82.21	1st	Won

=== National Assembly ===
National Assembly
Election year	Leader	1st round		2nd round		Seats	+/−	Rank	Result
Election year	Leader	Votes	%	Votes	%	Seats	+/−	Rank	Result
1978	Jacques Chirac	6,462,462	22.62	6,651,756	26.11	150 / 491	▼33	1st	Government
1981	Jacques Chirac	5,231,269	20.81	4,174,302	22.35	85 / 491	▼63	2nd	Opposition
1986	Jacques Chirac	3,143,224	11.22	-	-	149 / 573	▲64	2nd	Government
1988	Jacques Chirac	4,687,047	19.19	4,688,493	23.09	126 / 577	▼23	3rd	Opposition
1993	Jacques Chirac	5,032,496	20.08	5,741,629	28.99	242 / 577	▲116	1st	Government
1997	Alain Juppé	3,983,257	15.65	5,714,354	22.46	139 / 577	▼103	2nd	Opposition

=== European Parliament ===
Election year	Main Candidate	Votes	%	Seats	+/−	European Parliament Group
1979	Jacques Chirac	3,301,980	16.31	15 / 81	–	European Progressive Democrats
1984	Simone Veil (UDF)	8,683,596	43.03	19 / 81	▲4	European Democratic Alliance
1984	joint list with Union for French Democracy, which together won 41 seats.					
1989	Valéry Giscard d'Estaing (PR)	5,242,038	28.88	14 / 81	▼5	European Democratic Alliance
1989	joint list with Union for French Democracy, which together won 26 seats.					
1994	Dominique Baudis (CDS)	4,985,574	25.58	14 / 87	Steady	European Democratic Alliance Union for Europe
1994	joint list with Union for French Democracy, which together won 28 seats.					
1999	Nicolas Sarkozy	2,263,476	12.82	12 / 87	▼3	European People's Party - European Democrats

== Past presidents ==
- Jacques Chirac, 1976–1994
- Alain Juppé, 1994–1997
- Philippe Séguin, 1997–1999
- Nicolas Sarkozy, 1999 (interim)
- Michèle Alliot-Marie, 1999–2002
- Serge Lepeltier, 2002 (interim)

== RPR Assembly Groups ==
- 1978–1981: 154 members including 11 caucusing (out of 491)
- 1981–1986: 88 members including 9 caucusing (out of 491)
- 1986–1988: 155 members including 8 caucusing (out of 577)
- 1988–1993: 130 members including 3 caucusing (out of 577)
- 1993–1997: 257 members including 12 caucusing (out of 577).
- 1997–2002: 140 members including 6 caucusing (out of 577)

== See also ==
- Gaullism
- Politics of France
