= Opinion polling for the 2009 European Parliament election in France =

This is a list of public opinion polls conducted for the 2009 European Parliament election in France, which was held on 7 June 2009.

Unless otherwise noted, all polls listed below are compliant with the regulations of the national polling commission (Commission nationale des sondages) and utilize the quota method.

== Graphical summary ==
The averages in the graphs below were constructed using polls listed below conducted by the seven major French pollsters. The graphs are smoothed 14-day weighted moving averages, using only the most recent poll conducted by any given pollster within that range (each poll weighted based on recency).

Because the Ipsos poll conducted from 5 to 6 June was not published during the electoral silence, it is not included in the average below.

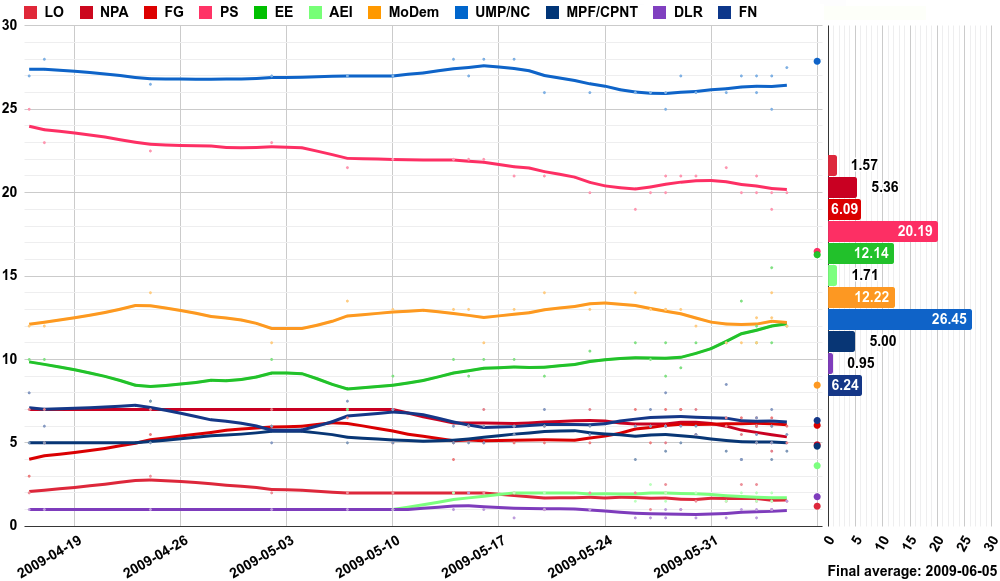

== Voting intentions ==
Polls conducted specifically for subsample data are listed with one asterisk (*), while the hypothetical poll conducted for the Left Party by Ifop in January 2009 is marked with two asterisks (**). The Ipsos poll conducted from 5 to 6 June was an internal survey which was not distributed during the electoral silence.

Polling firm	Fieldwork date	Sample size	Abs.	LO	NPA	FG	PS	EE	AEI	MoDem	NC	UMP	MPF	CPNT	DLR	FN	PDF	DIV
2009 election	7 Jun 2009	–	59.37%	1.20%	4.88%	6.05%	16.48%	16.28%	3.63%	8.46%	27.88%		4.80% (Libertas)		1.77%	6.34%	0.51%	1.73%
Ipsos	5–6 Jun 2009	888	–	1.5%	5%	6.5%	18%	16.5%	1.5%	8.5%	28.5%		5%		1%	5.5%	–	2.5%
Ifop	4–5 Jun 2009	856	63%	1.5%	5%	6%	20%	12%	–	12%	27.5%		4.5%		1.5%	5.5%	–	4.5%
CSA	3–4 Jun 2009	875	–	1%	5%	6%	20%	11%	2%	14%	25%		6%		1%	7%	–	2%
TNS Sofres	3–4 Jun 2009	1,000	–	1.5%	4.5%	6.5%	19%	15.5%	1.5%	12.5%	27%		4%		1%	5%	–	2%
Ipsos	2–3 Jun 2009	1,002	60%	1.5%	6.5%	6%	21%	11%	1.5%	11%	27%		6%		1%	5.5%	–	2%
OpinionWay	2–3 Jun 2009	4,970	56%	2.5%	5%	6%	20%	12%	2%	12.5%	26%		5%		0.5%	6.5%	–	2%
TNS Sofres	2 Jun 2009	1,000	–	2.5%	5.5%	6.5%	20%	13.5%	2%	11%	27%		4%		1%	4%	–	3%
BVA	27 May–1 Jun 2009	3,527	–	1.5%	6.5%	6%	21.5%	11%	1.5%	11%	26%		4.5%		0.5%	8.5%	–	1.5%
Ipsos	29–30 May 2009	861	60%	1.5%	7%	5.5%	21%	11%	2%	12%	26%		6%		0.5%	5.5%	–	2%
Ifop	28–29 May 2009	858	63%	1%	7%	7%	21%	9.5%	–	13%	27%		5%		1%	6%	–	2.5%
CSA	27–28 May 2009	862	–	2%	5%	6%	21%	9%	2%	13%	25%		6%		1%	8%	–	2%
TNS Sofres	27–28 May 2009	1,000	–	2.5%	6%	7%	20%	11%	1.5%	13%	26%		4.5%		0.5%	6%	–	2%
OpinionWay	25–27 May 2009	5,581	–	1%	6%	5%	20%	10%	2.5%	13%	26%		6%		0.5%	7%	–	3%
TNS Sofres	25–26 May 2009	1,000	–	2%	6%	7%	19%	11%	1.5%	14%	26%		4%		0.5%	6%	–	3%
Ipsos	22–23 May 2009	861	63%	2%	7%	5%	20%	10.5%	–	13%	26%		6%		1%	5.5%	–	4%
CSA	19–20 May 2009	903	–	1%	6%	5%	21%	9%	2%	14%	26%		6%		1%	7%	–	2%
OpinionWay	15–18 May 2009	4,724	–	2%	6%	5%	21%	10%	2%	13%	28%		5.5%		0.5%	6%	–	1%
Ipsos	15–16 May 2009	862	–	2%	7%	5%	22%	10%	–	11%	28%		6%		1%	5%	–	3%
Viavoice	13–15 May 2009	1,010	–	2%	6%	6%	22%	9%	–	13%	27%		5%		2%	6%	–	2%
CSA	13–14 May 2009	1,003	–	2%	5%	4%	22%	10%	2%	13%	28%		5%		1%	6%	–	2%
OpinionWay	7–10 May 2009	5,079	–	2%	7%	5%	22%	9%	1%	13%	27%		5%		1%	7%	–	1%
Ifop	6–7 May 2009	886	–	2%	7%	6.5%	21.5%	7%	–	13.5%	27%		5%		1%	7.5%	–	2%
Ifop*	29 Apr–7 May 2009	1,741	–	2%	7.5%	6.5%	21.5%	8%	–	14%	26%		5%		–	7.5%	–	2%
Ipsos	30 Apr–2 May 2009	861	–	2%	7%	6%	23%	10%	–	11%	27%		6%		1%	5%	–	2%
Ifop	23–24 Apr 2009	853	–	3%	7%	5.5%	22.5%	7.5%	–	14%	26.5%		5%		1%	7.5%	0.5%	–
OpinionWay	16–17 Apr 2009	1,005	–	–	7%	5%	23%	10%	–	12%	28%		5%		1%	6%	–	3%
CSA	15–16 Apr 2009	904	–	2%	7%	3%	25%	10%	–	12%	27%		5%		1%	8%	–	–
Ipsos	13–14 Mar 2009	887	–	2%	9%	6%	24%	9%	–	10%	27%		6%		1%	5.5%	0.5%	–
Ifop	12–13 Feb 2009	862	–	3%	9%	4%	23%	7%	–	14.5%	26%		5%		2%	6%	0.5%	–
Ifop**	22–23 Jan 2009	876	–	14.5%			22.5%	7%	–	14%	25.5%		6%	2.5%	1.5%	6.5%	–	–
Ifop	27–28 Nov 2008	881	–	4%	8%	4%	22%	11%	–	12%	2%	22%	4%	3%	1%	7%	–	–
2004 election	13 Jun 2004	–	57.24%	2.56%		5.25%	28.90%	7.41%	1.91%	11.96% (UDF)		16.64%	6.67%	1.73%	–	9.81%	–	7.16%

=== By constituency ===
==== Nord-Ouest ====
Polling firm	Fieldwork date	Sample size	Abs.	LO	NPA	FG	PS	EE	AEI	MoDem	NC	UMP	MPF	CPNT	DLR	FN	PDF	DIV
2009 election	7 Jun 2009	–	60.21%	2.08%	5.80%	6.84%	18.10%	12.10%	3.56%	8.67%	24.22%		4.26%		2.40%	10.18%	1.52%	0.28%
BVA	27 May–1 Jun 2009	500	–	5%	9%	5%	22%	8%	1%	11%	23%		5%		–	9%	1%	1%

==== Ouest ====
Polling firm	Fieldwork date	Sample size	Abs.	LO	NPA	FG	PS	EE	AEI	MoDem	NC	UMP	MPF	CPNT	DLR	FN	DIV
2009 election	7 Jun 2009	–	57.64%	1.25%	5.13%	4.58%	17.29%	16.65%	3.73%	8.48%	27.16%		10.27%		0.59%	3.06%	1.82%
BVA	27 May–1 Jun 2009	500	–	2%	6%	3%	24%	12%	1%	16%	22%		7%		–	5%	2%

==== Est ====
Polling firm	Fieldwork date	Sample size	Abs.	LO	NPA	FG	PS	EE	AEI	MoDem	NC	UMP	MPF	CPNT	DLR	FN	DIV
2009 election	7 Jun 2009	–	60.90%	1.46%	5.64%	3.89%	17.24%	14.28%	4.26%	9.44%	29.20%		4.10%		2.33%	7.57%	0.58%
BVA	27 May–1 Jun 2009	500	–	1.5%	7%	6%	20%	9%	1.5%	10%	24%		5%		–	15%	1%

==== Sud-Ouest ====
Polling firm	Fieldwork date	Sample size	Abs.	LO	NPA	FG	PS	EE	AEI	MoDem	NC	UMP	MPF	CPNT	DLR	FN	PDF	DIV
2009 election	7 Jun 2009	–	55.50%	1.02%	5.62%	8.16%	17.72%	15.83%	4.24%	8.61%	26.89%		3.06%		1.28%	5.94%	0.92%	0.74%
BVA	27 May–1 Jun 2009	500	–	2%	8%	7%	21%	11%	2%	12%	24%		3%		–	8%	–	2%
Ifop	12–13 May 2009	703	–	2%	7%	7%	23%	8.5%	3%	13%	23.5%		5%		–	5.5%	–	2.5%

==== Sud-Est ====
Polling firm	Fieldwork date	Sample size	Abs.	LO	NPA	FG	PS	EE	AEI	MoDem	NC	UMP	MPF	CPNT	DLR	FN	DIV
2009 election	7 Jun 2009	–	60.36%	0.84%	4.33%	5.90%	14.49%	18.27%	3.75%	7.37%	29.34%		4.29%		1.99%	8.49%	0.92%
BVA	27 May–1 Jun 2009	500	–	1.5%	5.5%	6%	22%	9%	1%	8.5%	29%		7%		–	9.5%	1%

==== Massif-Central Centre ====
Polling firm	Fieldwork date	Sample size	Abs.	LO	NPA	FG	PS	EE	AEI	MoDem	NC	UMP	MPF	CPNT	DLR	FN	PDF	DIV
2009 election	7 Jun 2009	–	57.43%	1.40%	5.45%	8.06%	17.79%	13.58%	3.45%	8.15%	28.51%		4.90%		1.43%	5.12%	1.88%	0.27%
BVA	27 May–1 Jun 2009	500	–	1%	6%	6%	23%	11%	2%	10%	27%		3%		–	9%	–	2%

==== Île-de-France ====
Polling firm	Fieldwork date	Sample size	Abs.	LO	NPA	FG	PS	EE	AEI	MoDem	NC	UMP	MPF	CPNT	DLR	FN	PAS	DIV
2009 election	7 Jun 2009	–	57.94%	0.74%	3.48%	6.32%	13.58%	20.86%	2.97%	8.52%	29.60%		3.28%		2.44%	4.40%	1.30%	2.51%
BVA	27 May–1 Jun 2009	500	–	1%	3%	7%	18%	16%	2%	11%	30.5%		3%		1%	5%	0.5%	2%
TNS Sofres	14–16 May 2009	1,000	–	1%	3%	5.5%	21.5%	14%	3%	12%	33%		1%		0.5%	4%	0.5%	1%

== See also ==
- Opinion polling for the 2014 European Parliament election in France
- Opinion polling for the 2019 European Parliament election in France
