= Opinion polling for the 2019 European Parliament election in France =

Opinion polls regarding the 2019 European Parliament election in France

This page lists public opinion polls conducted for the 2019 European Parliament election in France, was held on 26 May 2019.

Unless otherwise noted, all polls listed below are compliant with the regulations of the national polling commission (Commission nationale des sondages) and utilize the quota method.

== Graphical summary ==
The averages in the graphs below were constructed using polls listed below, excluding those conducted on behalf of a political party or movement. Trendlines are local regressions. Where possible, the scenario with gilets jaunes lists is used.

== Voting intentions ==
Polls marked with an asterisk (*) were conducted on behalf of a political party. The May 2018 Viavoice poll was conducted for Europe Ecology – The Greens (EELV). The October 2018 Ifop polls tested two scenarios: one in which Ségolène Royal did not lead the Socialist Party (PS) list (in which the PS received 6%), and the other in which she did (in which it the PS received 7.5%). The December 2018 Ipsos poll was commissioned by La République En Marche! and obtained by Le Journal du Dimanche, and the Ifop poll fielded from 3 to 4 December was conducted for Raphaël Glucksmann's movement Place Publique (including the movement in a union list of the left).

Ifop-Fiducial polls completed on or after 7 March listed in the table below are "rolling" polls unless otherwise denoted by two asterisks (**), as is the case with Harris Interactive polls completed on or after 26 April. Starting on 15 March, the Ifop-Fiducial poll asked specifically about a list consisting of Place Publique and the Socialist Party, as opposed to the PS alone; until 26 March, it continued to ask about a list conducted by the NPA, which later ruled out its participation in the European elections due to its lack of funds; and until 15 April, also continued to ask about a Résistons! list, which also lacked sufficient financing.

In 2014, the EELV alone received 8.95% of valid votes; in 2019, the party will run in a common list with the Independent Ecological Alliance (AEI) and Régions et Peuples Solidaires (R&PS), which received 1.12% and 0.34% of the vote in 2014, respectively, for a total of 10.41% of votes in 2014. The PS, which will run in a common list alongside Place Publique, received 13.98% of valid votes in 2014; in 2019, it will also be allied with New Deal, which received 2.90% of the vote in 2014; together, the lists received 16.88% of the vote in 2014.

On 4 May 2019, following the publication of the entire list of 33 electoral lists in the election by the Ministry of the Interior, the polling commission recommended that pollsters test all 33 lists with the names, supporting parties, and lead candidates, and list the individual scores for each list even for those lists which obtain only low voting intentions, using a designation such as "less than 0.5%" if necessary.

The publication of polls will be prohibited after midnight on 24 May 2019.

As in every national vote, several polling firms will release estimations of the results after the closing of ballot boxes, including Harris Interactive with Epoka (on behalf of TF1, RTL, Le Figaro), as well as Ipsos with Sopra Steria (on behalf of France Télévisions with Radio France), a partnership running through 2022.

| Polling firm | Fieldwork date | Sample size | Abs. | LO | NPA | FI | PCF | PS/ PP/ND | G.s | EELV | GE/MEI/ MdP | PA | LREM/ MoDem | UDI | Agir | LR/ LC | DLF | RN | LP | UPR | R! | AJ/GJ | DIV |
|---|---|---|---|---|---|---|---|---|---|---|---|---|---|---|---|---|---|---|---|---|---|---|---|
| 2019 election | 26 May 2019 | – | 49.88% | 0.78% | – | 6.31% | 2.49% | 6.19% | 3.27% | 13.48% | 1.82% | 2.16% | 22.42% | 2.50% | – | 8.48% | 3.51% | 23.34% | 0.65% | 1.17% | – | 0.54% (Note: Alliance Jaune with 0.54%) | 0.89% (Note: Les Oubliés de l'Europe with 0.23%; Pirate Party and Union des Démocrates Musulmans Français with 0.13%; Europe Démocratie Espéranto with 0.08%; European Federalist Party and Décroissance 2019 with 0.05%; Allons Enfants with 0.04%; À Voix Égales, Parti des Citoyens Européens, and Mouvement pour l'Initiative Citoyenne with 0.03%; Union Démocratique pour la Liberté, Égalité, Fraternité and Reconquête with 0.02%; Alliance Royale, Démocratie Représentative, Évolution Citoyenne, La Ligne Claire, Parti Révolutionnaire Communistes, and Neutre et Actif with 0.01%) |
| Ipsos | 24 May 2019 | 5,877 | 53% | 0.5% | – | 7.5% | 2.5% | 5.5% | 2.5% | 9.5% | 0.5% | 1.5% | 23% | 1.5% | – | 13% | 3.5% | 25% | 0.5% | 1% | – | 1% (Note: Alliance Jaune with 1%) | 1.5% (Note: Alliance Royale, La Ligne Claire, Pirate Party, Démocratie Représentative, Parti des Citoyens Européens, Reconquête, European Federalist Party, Mouvement pour l'Initiative Citoyenne, Allons Enfants, Décroissance 2019, À Voix Égales, Neutre et Actif, Parti Révolutionnaire Communistes, Europe Démocratie Espéranto, Évolution Citoyenne, Les Oubliés de l'Europe, Union Démocratique pour la Liberté, Égalité, Fraternité, and Union des Démocrates Musulmans Français with <0.5%) |
| Elabe | 23–24 May 2019 | 2,010 | 55% | 1% | – | 8.5% | 2.5% | 4.5% | 2.5% | 9% | 1% | 1.5% | 22.5% | 1% | – | 13% | 4% | 25% | 2% | 1% | – | <0.5% (Note: Alliance Jaune with <0.5%) | 1% |
| Harris Interactive | 23–24 May 2019 | 1,015 | – | 1% | – | 9% | 3.5% | 5% | 2% | 7.5% | 1% | 1.5% | 22.5% | 1.5% | – | 12% | 3.5% | 25% | 1% | 1% | – | 1% | 2% |
| Ifop-Fiducial | 21–24 May 2019 | 2,773 | 53.5% | 0.5% | – | 7.5% | 3% | 5.5% | 2% | 8% | 0.5% | 1.5% | 23% | 1.5% | – | 13.5% | 4% | 25.5% | 1.5% | 1% | – | 1% | 0.5% (Note: Union des Démocrates Musulmans Français with 0.5%; Alliance Royale, La Ligne Claire, Pirate Party, Démocratie Représentative, Parti des Citoyens Européens, Reconquête, European Federalist Party, Mouvement pour l'Initiative Citoyenne, Allons Enfants, Décroissance 2019, À Voix Égales, Neutre et Actif, Parti Révolutionnaire Communistes, Europe Démocratie Espéranto, Évolution Citoyenne, Les Oubliés de l'Europe, and Union Démocratique pour la Liberté, Égalité, Fraternité with <0.5%) |
| Harris Interactive | 22–23 May 2019 | 1,027 | – | 1% | – | 9.5% | 3.5% | 5% | 2% | 7.5% | 0.5% | 1.5% | 22.5% | 1.5% | – | 12% | 3.5% | 24.5% | 1.5% | 1% | – | 1% | 2% |
| Ipsos | 22–23 May 2019 | 3,355 | 55% | 1% | – | 7.5% | 2.5% | 5.5% | 3% | 9% | 0.5% | 1.5% | 23% | 1.5% | – | 13% | 3.5% | 24.5% | 0.5% | 1% | – | 1% | 1.5% |
| Ifop-Fiducial | 20–23 May 2019 | 2,757 | 54.5% | 0.5% | – | 8% | 3.5% | 6% | 2% | 7% | 1% | 1% | 23% | 1.5% | – | 14% | 4% | 24.5% | 2% | 1.5% | – | 0.5% (Note: Alliance Jaune with 0.5%) | <0.5% |
| Harris Interactive | 21–22 May 2019 | 1,007 | – | 1% | – | 9.5% | 3.5% | 4.5% | 2% | 7.5% | 0.5% | 1% | 22.5% | 1.5% | – | 12.5% | 3.5% | 24% | 1.5% | 1% | – | 1% | 3% |
| OpinionWay | 20–22 May 2019 | 2,914 | 56% | 1% | – | 8% | 3% | 6% | 2% | 9% | 1% | 1% | 23% | 1% | – | 13% | 3% | 25% | 1% | 1% | – | 1% | 1% (Note: Alliance Royale, La Ligne Claire, Pirate Party, Démocratie Représentative, Parti des Citoyens Européens, Reconquête, European Federalist Party, Mouvement pour l'Initiative Citoyenne, Allons Enfants, Décroissance 2019, À Voix Égales, Neutre et Actif, Parti Révolutionnaire Communistes, Europe Démocratie Espéranto, Évolution Citoyenne, Les Oubliés de l'Europe, Union Démocratique pour la Liberté, Égalité, Fraternité, and Union des Démocrates Musulmans Français with <1%) |
| Ifop-Fiducial | 18–22 May 2019 | 2,750 | 55% | 0.5% | – | 8.5% | 3.5% | 6% | 2.5% | 6.5% | 1% | 1% | 23% | 1.5% | – | 14% | 4% | 24.5% | 1.5% | 1.5% | – | 0.5% | <0.5% |
| BVA | 20–21 May 2019 | 1,347 | 51% | 0.5% | – | 8.5% | 3% | 5% | 2.5% | 8% | 1% | 1.5% | 22% | 1.5% | – | 13% | 3.5% | 23% | 2% | 1.5% | – | <0.5% | 3.5% |
| Harris Interactive | 20–21 May 2019 | 1,024 | – | 1% | – | 9.5% | 3% | 5% | 2% | 7% | 0.5% | 1% | 22.5% | 1.5% | – | 12.5% | 3.5% | 24% | 2% | 1% | – | 0.5% | 3.5% |
| Ipsos | 20–21 May 2019 | 1,495 | 58% | 0.5% | – | 7.5% | 2.5% | 5.5% | 2.5% | 9% | 1.5% | 1% | 23.5% | 1% | – | 13% | 4% | 24% | 1% | 1% | – | 1% | 1.5% |
| Elabe | 19–21 May 2019 | 2,004 | 54% | 1.5% | – | 8% | 3% | 4% | 3% | 8.5% | 1.5% | 1.5% | 23% | 1% | – | 12.5% | 4.5% | 23.5% | 2% | 1% | – | 0.5% | 1% (Note: Parti des Citoyens Européens and Allons Enfants with 0.5%; Alliance Royale, La Ligne Claire, Pirate Party, Démocratie Représentative, Reconquête, European Federalist Party, Mouvement pour l'Initiative Citoyenne, Décroissance 2019, À Voix Égales, Neutre et Actif, Parti Révolutionnaire Communistes, Europe Démocratie Espéranto, Évolution Citoyenne, Les Oubliés de l'Europe, Union Démocratique pour la Liberté, Égalité, Fraternité, and Union des Démocrates Musulmans Français with <0.5%) |
| Ifop-Fiducial | 17–21 May 2019 | 2,739 | 56% | 0.5% | – | 8.5% | 3.5% | 6% | 2.5% | 6.5% | 1% | 1.5% | 23% | 1.5% | – | 14% | 4% | 24% | 1.5% | 1% | – | 1% | <0.5% |
| Harris Interactive | 19–20 May 2019 | 1,022 | – | 0.5% | – | 10% | 3% | 5% | 2% | 7% | 1% | 1% | 22% | 2% | – | 12.5% | 3.5% | 24% | 2% | 1% | – | 1% | 2.5% |
| Ifop-Fiducial | 16–20 May 2019 | 2,754 | 56% | 0.5% | – | 9% | 3.5% | 6% | 2% | 6.5% | 1% | 1.5% | 22.5% | 1.5% | – | 13.5% | 4.5% | 24% | 2% | 1% | – | 1% | <0.5% |
| Harris Interactive | 18–19 May 2019 | 1,006 | – | 0.5% | – | 10% | 3% | 5% | 2% | 7.5% | 0.5% | 0.5% | 22.5% | 1.5% | – | 12.5% | 3.5% | 24% | 2% | 1% | – | 1% | 3% |
| Harris Interactive | 17–18 May 2019 | 1,031 | – | 0.5% | – | 10% | 3% | 5% | 2% | 7% | 0.5% | 0.5% | 22% | 1.5% | – | 12.5% | 3.5% | 24% | 2% | 1% | – | 1% | 4% |
| Harris Interactive | 16–17 May 2019 | 1,014 | – | 0.5% | – | 9.5% | 3.5% | 5% | 2.5% | 7% | 0.5% | 0.5% | 22.5% | 1% | – | 12.5% | 3.5% | 23.5% | 2% | 1% | – | 1% | 4% |
| Ifop-Fiducial | 14–17 May 2019 | 2,773 | 56.5% | 0.5% | – | 9% | 3% | 6% | 2% | 7% | 1% | 1% | 22.5% | 1.5% | – | 13.5% | 4.5% | 24% | 2% | 1.5% | – | 1% | <0.5% |
| Ipsos | 14–17 May 2019 | 9,610 | 57% | 1% | – | 7.5% | 3% | 5.5% | 3% | 8.5% | 1% | 1% | 23% | 1.5% | – | 13% | 4% | 23.5% | 1% | 1% | – | 1% | 1.5% |
| Harris Interactive | 15–16 May 2019 | 1,048 | – | 1% | – | 9.5% | 3% | 5% | 2.5% | 7.5% | 0.5% | 0.5% | 22.5% | 1.5% | – | 12.5% | 3.5% | 23% | 2% | 1% | – | 1% | 3.5% |
| Ifop-Fiducial | 13–16 May 2019 | 2,765 | 56% | 0.5% | – | 8.5% | 3% | 5.5% | 2.5% | 7% | 1% | 1% | 23% | 1.5% | – | 14% | 4% | 24% | 2% | 1.5% | – | 1% | <0.5% |
| Harris Interactive | 14–15 May 2019 | 1,033 | – | 1% | – | 9.5% | 2.5% | 5% | 2.5% | 7% | 0.5% | 0.5% | 22% | 1.5% | – | 13% | 3% | 23% | 2.5% | 1% | – | 1% | 4.5% |
| Ifop-Fiducial | 11–15 May 2019 | 2,301 | 56% | 0.5% | – | 8.5% | 3% | 5.5% | 2.5% | 7% | 1% | 1% | 22.5% | 2% | – | 14% | 4% | 23.5% | 2.5% | 1.5% | – | 1% | <0.5% |
| OpinionWay | 8–15 May 2019 | 1,973 | 60% | 1% | – | 8% | 4% | 5% | 2% | 7% | 1% | 1% | 22% | 2% | – | 14% | 4% | 24% | 1% | 1% | – | 1% | 2% |
| Harris Interactive | 13–14 May 2019 | 1,052 | – | 1% | – | 9.5% | 2.5% | 5% | 2.5% | 7% | 0.5% | 0.5% | 22% | 1.5% | – | 13% | 3.5% | 22.5% | 2.5% | 1.5% | – | 1.5% (Note: Alliance Jaune with 1.5%) | 3.5% |
| Elabe | 12–14 May 2019 | 2,002 | 59% | 1.5% | – | 7.5% | 2% | 4% | 2.5% | 10% | 1.5% | 1.5% | 23.5% | 1.5% | – | 11% | 4% | 22% | 2.5% | 1% | – | 1% | 3% (Note: Pirate Party, Neutre et Actif, and Union des Démocrates Musulmans Français with 0.5%; Alliance Royale, La Ligne Claire, Démocratie Représentative, Parti des Citoyens Européens, Reconquête, European Federalist Party, Mouvement pour l'Initiative Citoyenne, Allons Enfants, Décroissance 2019, À Voix Égales, Parti Révolutionnaire Communistes, Europe Démocratie Espéranto, Évolution Citoyenne, Les Oubliés de l'Europe, and Union Démocratique pour la Liberté, Égalité, Fraternité with <0.5%) |
| Ifop-Fiducial | 10–14 May 2019 | 1,836 | 56% | 0.5% | – | 8.5% | 3% | 5.5% | 2.5% | 7.5% | 1% | 0.5% | 22.5% | 2% | – | 14% | 4.5% | 23% | 2.5% | 1.5% | – | 1% | <0.5% |
| Harris Interactive | 12–13 May 2019 | 1,034 | – | 1% | – | 9.5% | 2% | 5% | 2.5% | 7% | 0.5% | 0.5% | 22% | 1% | – | 13% | 3.5% | 22.5% | 2.5% | 1% | – | 1.5% | 5% |
| Ifop-Fiducial | 9–13 May 2019 | 1,370 | 57% | 0.5% | – | 8% | 2.5% | 6% | 3% | 7.5% | 1% | 0.5% | 22.5% | 2% | – | 14% | 4.5% | 22.5% | 3% | 1% | – | 1% | 0.5% |
| Harris Interactive | 11–12 May 2019 | 1,031 | – | 1% | – | 10% | 2.5% | 4.5% | 2.5% | 7% | 0.5% | 0.5% | 22% | 1% | – | 13% | 3.5% | 22.5% | 2.5% | 1.5% | – | 1.5% | 4% |
| Harris Interactive | 10–11 May 2019 | 1,033 | – | 1% | – | 10% | 3% | 4.5% | 2% | 7% | 1% | 0.5% | 22% | 1.5% | – | 12.5% | 3.5% | 22.5% | 3% | 1% | – | 1% | 4% |
| Harris Interactive | 9–10 May 2019 | 1,060 | – | 1% | – | 10% | 2.5% | 4.5% | 2.5% | 7% | 0.5% | 0.5% | 22% | 2% | – | 13% | 3% | 22% | 3% | 1.5% | – | 1% | 4% (Note: Alliance Royale, La Ligne Claire, Pirate Party, Démocratie Représentative, Parti des Citoyens Européens, Reconquête, European Federalist Party, Mouvement pour l'Initiative Citoyenne, Allons Enfants, Décroissance 2019, À Voix Égales, Neutre et Actif, Parti Révolutionnaire Communistes, Europe Démocratie Espéranto, Évolution Citoyenne, Les Oubliés de l'Europe, and Union Démocratique pour la Liberté, Égalité, Fraternité with <0.5%) |
| Ifop-Fiducial | 7–10 May 2019 | 1,368 | 58% | 0.5% | – | 7.5% | 2.5% | 6% | 3% | 8% | 1.5% | 1% | 23% | 1.5% | – | 14% | 5% | 22% | 2.5% | 1% | – | 1% | <0.5% |
| Harris Interactive | 8–9 May 2019 | 1,053 | – | 1% | – | 9.5% | 2.5% | 5% | 2% | 7% | 0.5% | 0.5% | 22% | 2% | – | 13% | 3% | 22% | 2.5% | 1.5% | – | 1% | 5% |
| Ifop-Fiducial | 6–9 May 2019 | 1,374 | 58% | 1% | – | 8% | 3% | 5.5% | 2.5% | 8.5% | 1% | 1% | 22.5% | 2% | – | 14% | 5% | 21.5% | 2.5% | 0.5% | – | 1.5% | <0.5% |
| Harris Interactive | 7–8 May 2019 | 1,043 | – | 1% | – | 9.5% | 3% | 5% | 2% | 7% | 1% | 0.5% | 21.5% | 1.5% | – | 13.5% | 3.5% | 21.5% | 2% | 1% | – | 1% | 5.5% |
| Kantar Sofres | 6–8 May 2019 | 2,010 | 57% | 2% | – | 8% | 2% | 5% | 3.5% | 8% | 1.5% | 1% | 20% | 1.5% | – | 14% | 4.5% | 23% | 1% | 1% | – | 1% | 3% |
| Ifop-Fiducial | 4–8 May 2019 | 1,389 | 57.5% | 0.5% | – | 8.5% | 3% | 5.5% | 3% | 8% | 1% | 0.5% | 22% | 2% | – | 14% | 5% | 22% | 2.5% | 1% | – | 1.5% | <0.5% |
| Elabe | 6–7 May 2019 | 1,583 | 60% | 1.5% | – | 9% | 2.5% | 4.5% | 2% | 9.5% | 1% | 1% | 22% | 2% | – | 14% | 5% | 22% | 2% | 0.5% | – | 1% | 0.5% (Note: Pirate Party with 0.5%; Alliance Royale, La Ligne Claire, Démocratie Représentative, Parti des Citoyens Européens, Reconquête, European Federalist Party, Mouvement pour l'Initiative Citoyenne, Allons Enfants, Décroissance 2019, À Voix Égales, Neutre et Actif, Parti Révolutionnaire Communistes, Europe Démocratie Espéranto, Évolution Citoyenne, Les Oubliés de l'Europe, and Union Démocratique pour la Liberté, Égalité, Fraternité with <0.5%) |
| Harris Interactive | 6–7 May 2019 | 1,043 | – | 1.5% | – | 9.5% | 2.5% | 5% | 2.5% | 7.5% | 1% | 0.5% | 21.5% | 1.5% | – | 13.5% | 3% | 21.5% | 2.5% | 1% | – | 1% | 4.5% |
| Ifop-Fiducial | 4–7 May 2019 | 1,405 | 57% | 0.5% | – | 9% | 3% | 5.5% | 3% | 8% | 0.5% | 0.5% | 21.5% | 2% | – | 14.5% | 5% | 22% | 2% | 1% | – | 2% (Note: Alliance Jaune with 2%) | <0.5% |
| Harris Interactive | 5–6 May 2019 | 1,015 | – | 1.5% | – | 9% | 3% | 5% | 2.5% | 7.5% | 1% | 0.5% | 21.5% | 2% | – | 14% | 3% | 21.5% | 2.5% | 1% | – | 1.5% | 3% |
| Ifop-Fiducial | 4–6 May 2019 | 945 | 58% | 0.5% | – | 9% | 3% | 5.5% | 2.5% | 8% | 1% | 0.5% | 21.5% | 2% | – | 14.5% | 5% | 22.5% | 1.5% | 1% | – | 1.5% | 0.5% (Note: Parti Révolutionnaire Communistes with 0.5%; Alliance Royale, La Ligne Claire, Pirate Party, Démocratie Représentative, Parti des Citoyens Européens, Reconquête, European Federalist Party, Mouvement pour l'Initiative Citoyenne, Allons Enfants, Décroissance 2019, À Voix Égales, Neutre et Actif, Europe Démocratie Espéranto, Évolution Citoyenne, Les Oubliés de l'Europe, and Union Démocratique pour la Liberté, Égalité, Fraternité with <0.5%) |
| OpinionWay | 4–6 May 2019 | 1,917 | 59% | 1% | – | 8% | 3% | 5% | 3% | 7% | 1% | 1% | 22% | 2% | – | 14% | 4% | 24% | 1% | 1% | – | 2% | 1% (Note: Alliance Royale, La Ligne Claire, Pirate Party, Démocratie Représentative, Parti des Citoyens Européens, Reconquête, European Federalist Party, Mouvement pour l'Initiative Citoyenne, Allons Enfants, Décroissance 2019, À Voix Égales, Neutre et Actif, Parti Révolutionnaire Communistes, Europe Démocratie Espéranto, Évolution Citoyenne, Les Oubliés de l'Europe, and Union Démocratique pour la Liberté, Égalité, Fraternité with <1%) |
| Harris Interactive | 4–5 May 2019 | 1,033 | – | 1.5% | – | 9.5% | 3% | 4.5% | 2.5% | 8% | 1% | 0.5% | 21.5% | 2% | – | 14% | 3% | 21% | 2.5% | 1% | – | 2% | 2.5% (Note: La Ligne Claire and Pirate Party with 0.5%; Alliance Royale, Démocratie Représentative, Parti des Citoyens Européens, Reconquête, European Federalist Party, Mouvement pour l'Initiative Citoyenne, Allons Enfants, Décroissance 2019, À Voix Égales, Neutre et Actif, Parti Révolutionnaire Communistes, Europe Démocratie Espéranto, Évolution Citoyenne, Les Oubliés de l'Europe, and Union Démocratique pour la Liberté, Égalité, Fraternité with <0.5%) |
| Harris Interactive | 3–4 May 2019 | 1,032 | – | 1% | – | 8.5% | 2% | 5% | 3% | 9% | – | – | 23.5% | 2% | – | 14.5% | 3.5% | 20.5% | 2% | 1% | – | 3% | 1.5% |
| Harris Interactive | 2–3 May 2019 | 1,066 | – | 1.5% | – | 9% | 2.5% | 5% | 3.5% | 8.5% | – | – | 24% | 1.5% | – | 14% | 4.5% | 21% | 2% | 1% | – | – | 2% |
| Harris Interactive | 2–3 May 2019 | 1,066 | – | 1% | – | 8.5% | 2.5% | 5% | 3.5% | 8.5% | – | – | 23.5% | 2% | – | 14% | 4% | 20% | 2% | 1% | – | 2.5% | 2% |
| Ipsos | 2–3 May 2019 | 1,500 | 60% | 1% | – | 8% | 2% | 5.5% | 3.5% | 8.5% | – | – | 21.5% | 2% | – | 13.5% | 5% | 22% | 1.5% | 1% | – | 2% | 3% |
| Ifop-Fiducial | 30 Apr–3 May 2019 | 1,397 | 60% | 1% | – | 8.5% | 3% | 5.5% | 2.5% | 9% | – | – | 21.5% | 1.5% | – | 15% | 4.5% | 23% | 1% | 1% | – | 2% | 1% |
| Harris Interactive | 1–2 May 2019 | 1,052 | – | 1.5% | – | 8.5% | 2% | 5% | 3.5% | 8% | – | – | 24% | 2% | – | 14% | 4% | 21% | 2% | 1.5% | – | – | 3% |
| Harris Interactive | 1–2 May 2019 | 1,052 | – | 1.5% | – | 8.5% | 2% | 5% | 3.5% | 8% | – | – | 23.5% | 2% | – | 13.5% | 4% | 20% | 2% | 1.5% | – | 3% | 2% |
| BVA | 30 Apr–2 May 2019 | 1,397 | 49% | 1.5% | – | 9% | 2.5% | 5.5% | 3% | 7.5% | 1% | – | 22% | 2% | – | 13% | 4.5% | 21% | 2% | 1% | – | 3% | 1.5% |
| Ifop-Fiducial | 29 Apr–2 May 2019 | 1,404 | 60% | 1% | – | 9.5% | 3.5% | 5% | 3% | 9% | – | – | 21.5% | 1% | – | 14.5% | 5% | 23% | 1.5% | 1.5% | – | – | 1% |
| Ifop-Fiducial | 29 Apr–2 May 2019 | 1,404 | 60% | 1% | – | 8.5% | 3% | 5% | 3% | 9% | – | – | 21.5% | 1.5% | – | 15% | 4.5% | 22.5% | 1.5% | 1% | – | 2% | 1% |
| Harris Interactive | 30 Apr–1 May 2019 | 1,043 | – | 1% | – | 9.5% | 2% | 5% | 3% | 8.5% | – | – | 23.5% | 2.5% | – | 14.5% | 4% | 21% | 2% | 1.5% | – | – | 2% |
| Harris Interactive | 30 Apr–1 May 2019 | 1,043 | – | 1% | – | 9% | 2% | 5% | 3% | 8.5% | – | – | 23.5% | 2% | – | 14% | 4% | 20.5% | 2% | 1% | – | 3% | 1.5% |
| OpinionWay | 24–30 Apr 2019 | 1,930 | 61% | 1% | – | 8% | 3% | 5% | 4% | 8% | – | – | 21% | 3% | – | 14% | 4% | 24% | 1% | 1% | – | – | 3% |
| Harris Interactive | 29–30 Apr 2019 | 1,037 | – | 1.5% | – | 9.5% | 2% | 5.5% | 2.5% | 9% | – | – | 23% | 2.5% | – | 14% | 4% | 21.5% | 1.5% | 1.5% | – | – | 2% |
| Harris Interactive | 29–30 Apr 2019 | 1,037 | – | 1.5% | – | 9% | 2% | 5.5% | 2.5% | 9% | – | – | 23% | 2.5% | – | 13.5% | 4% | 21% | 1.5% | 1% | – | 2.5% | 1.5% |
| Ifop-Fiducial | 26–30 Apr 2019 | 1,379 | 59% | 0.5% | – | 8% | 2.5% | 5% | 3% | 9.5% | – | – | 22.5% | 1% | – | 14.5% | 5% | 22% | 2% | 1% | – | 2.5% | 1% |
| Elabe | 28–29 Apr 2019 | 1,200 | 61% | 1% | – | 8% | 1.5% | 4% | 4% | 9% | – | – | 22.5% | 3.5% | – | 15.5% | 4% | 21.5% | 1.5% | 1% | – | – | 3% |
| Elabe | 28–29 Apr 2019 | 1,200 | 61% | 1% | – | 8% | 1.5% | 4% | 3.5% | 9% | – | – | 22.5% | 4% | – | 14.5% | 3.5% | 21% | 2% | 1% | – | 2% | 2.5% |
| Harris Interactive | 28–29 Apr 2019 | 1,052 | – | 1% | – | 9% | 2.5% | 5% | 3% | 8% | – | – | 24% | 2% | – | 14.5% | 3.5% | 21.5% | 1.5% | 1.5% | – | – | 3% |
| Harris Interactive | 28–29 Apr 2019 | 1,052 | – | 1% | – | 8.5% | 2.5% | 5% | 3% | 8% | – | – | 24% | 2% | – | 14% | 3.5% | 21.5% | 1.5% | 1.5% | – | 2.5% | 1.5% |
| Ifop-Fiducial | 25–29 Apr 2019 | 1,369 | 59% | 0.5% | – | 8% | 2.5% | 5.5% | 3% | 9.5% | – | – | 23% | 1% | – | 14.5% | 4.5% | 21.5% | 2% | 1% | – | 2.5% | 1% |
| Harris Interactive | 27–28 Apr 2019 | 1,052 | – | 1.5% | – | 9.5% | 2% | 5.5% | 3.5% | 8.5% | – | – | 23.5% | 2% | – | 15% | 4% | 21% | 1% | 1% | – | – | 2% |
| Harris Interactive | 27–28 Apr 2019 | 1,052 | – | 1% | – | 9% | 2.5% | 5% | 3.5% | 8.5% | – | – | 23.5% | 2% | – | 14.5% | 4% | 21% | 1% | 1% | – | 2% | 1.5% |
| Harris Interactive | 26–27 Apr 2019 | 1,059 | – | 1% | – | 9.5% | 2% | 5.5% | 3% | 9% | – | – | 24% | 2% | – | 15% | 4% | 21% | 1% | 1% | – | – | 2% |
| Harris Interactive | 26–27 Apr 2019 | 1,059 | – | 1% | – | 9% | 2% | 5.5% | 3% | 9% | – | – | 24% | 2% | – | 14.5% | 4% | 21% | 1% | 1% | – | 2% | 1% |
| Harris Interactive | 25–26 Apr 2019 | 1,072 | – | 1% | – | 10% | 2.5% | 6% | 3% | 9.5% | – | – | 23.5% | 2% | – | 14.5% | 3.5% | 21% | 0.5% | 1.5% | – | – | 1.5% |
| Harris Interactive | 25–26 Apr 2019 | 1,072 | – | 1% | – | 9.5% | 2.5% | 6% | 3% | 9.5% | – | – | 23.5% | 2% | – | 14% | 3.5% | 20.5% | 0.5% | 1.5% | – | 1.5% | 1.5% |
| Ifop-Fiducial | 23–26 Apr 2019 | 1,385 | 60% | 0.5% | – | 9% | 2.5% | 5.5% | 3% | 9% | – | – | 23% | 1.5% | – | 15% | 4% | 21.5% | 2% | 1% | – | 1.5% | 1% |
| Ifop-Fiducial | 20–25 Apr 2019 | 1,850 | 59.5% | 1% | – | 9.5% | 2.5% | 6% | 3% | 8.5% | – | – | 22.5% | 1.5% | – | 14.5% | 4.5% | 22% | 2% | 1.5% | – | – | 1% |
| Ifop-Fiducial | 20–25 Apr 2019 | 1,850 | 59.5% | 1% | – | 9% | 2.5% | 6% | 3% | 8.5% | – | – | 22.5% | 1.5% | – | 15% | 4% | 21% | 2% | 1% | – | 2% | 1% |
| Ifop-Fiducial | 20–24 Apr 2019 | 1,393 | 59.5% | 1% | – | 9% | 2% | 6% | 3% | 8.5% | – | – | 22% | 1.5% | – | 15% | 4.5% | 20.5% | 2.5% | 1.5% | – | 2% | 1% |
| Ifop-Fiducial | 19–23 Apr 2019 | 1,369 | 59% | 1% | – | 8.5% | 2.5% | 6% | 3% | 8.5% | – | – | 22% | 1.5% | – | 14.5% | 4.5% | 21% | 2.5% | 1.5% | – | 2% | 1% |
| OpinionWay | 17–23 Apr 2019 | 1,965 | 60% | 1% | – | 9% | 3% | 6% | 3% | 7% | – | – | 21% | 3% | – | 14% | 4% | 24% | 1% | 1% | – | – | 3% |
| Ipsos | 18–22 Apr 2019 | 8,747 | 58% | 1% | – | 7.5% | 2% | 6.5% | 4% | 8.5% | – | – | 23% | 2% | – | 13.5% | 5% | 22.5% | 1% | 1% | – | – | 2.5% |
| Ipsos | 18–22 Apr 2019 | 8,747 | 58% | 1% | – | 7% | 2% | 6.5% | 4% | 8.5% | – | – | 23% | 2% | – | 13.5% | 4.5% | 22% | 1% | 1% | – | 2% | 2% |
| BVA | 15–21 Apr 2019 | 5,324 | 53.5% | 1% | – | 7.5% | 2.5% | 6% | 3.5% | 8% | 1% | – | 23% | 2% | – | 13% | 4.5% | 22% | 2% | 1% | – | 2% | 1% |
| Harris Interactive | 19–20 Apr 2019 | 1,056 | – | 1.5% | – | 9.5% | 2% | 6.5% | 3% | 9% | – | – | 24% | 1.5% | – | 14% | 4% | 21.5% | 0.5% | 1.5% | – | – | 1.5% |
| Harris Interactive | 19–20 Apr 2019 | 1,056 | – | 1.5% | – | 9% | 2.5% | 6.5% | 3% | 8.5% | – | – | 23.5% | 1.5% | – | 13.5% | 4% | 21% | 0.5% | 1.5% | – | 2% | 1.5% |
| Ifop-Fiducial | 16–19 Apr 2019 | 1,361 | 59% | 1% | – | 7% | 2.5% | 6.5% | 3% | 8.5% | – | – | 22% | 1.5% | – | 14% | 4.5% | 22.5% | 2% | 1% | – | 3% | 1% |
| Ifop-Fiducial | 15–18 Apr 2019 | 1,333 | 59% | 1% | – | 8% | 3% | 6% | 3.5% | 9% | – | – | 22% | 2% | – | 13.5% | 5.5% | 22% | 2.5% | 1% | – | – | 1% |
| Ifop-Fiducial | 15–18 Apr 2019 | 1,333 | 59% | 1% | – | 7% | 2.5% | 6.5% | 3% | 9% | – | – | 22% | 2% | – | 13.5% | 5% | 21.5% | 2% | 1% | – | 3% | 1% |
| Ifop-Fiducial | 13–17 Apr 2019 | 1,335 | 58% | 1% | – | 7.5% | 2.5% | 6% | 3.5% | 9% | – | – | 22% | 2% | – | 13.5% | 5% | 21.5% | 2% | 1% | <0.5% | 2.5% | 1% |
| Ifop-Fiducial | 12–16 Apr 2019 | 1,358 | 57% | 1% | – | 8% | 3% | 6% | 3.5% | 9% | – | – | 21.5% | 2% | – | 13% | 5% | 21% | 1.5% | 2% | <0.5% | 2.5% | 1% |
| Ifop-Fiducial | 11–15 Apr 2019 | 1,391 | 57% | 1% | – | 8% | 3% | 6% | 3.5% | 8.5% | – | – | 21.5% | 2% | – | 13% | 5% | 21.5% | 1% | 1.5% | 0.5% | 3% | 1% |
| Harris Interactive | 12–13 Apr 2019 | 1,031 | – | 1% | – | 9.5% | 2.5% | 6.5% | 4% | 8% | – | – | 22.5% | 2% | – | 14% | 4% | 21% | 1% | 2% | – | – | 2% |
| Harris Interactive | 12–13 Apr 2019 | 1,031 | – | 1% | – | 9% | 2.5% | 6.5% | 4% | 7.5% | – | – | 22.5% | 2% | – | 14% | 4% | 20.5% | 1% | 2% | – | 2.5% | 1% |
| Ifop-Fiducial | 9–12 Apr 2019 | 1,388 | 58% | 1% | – | 8.5% | 3.5% | 5.5% | 3% | 7.5% | – | – | 22% | 2% | – | 13% | 5% | 21.5% | 1.5% | 1% | 1% | 3% | 1% |
| BVA | 10–11 Apr 2019 | 1,402 | 53% | 1.5% | – | 8% | 2% | 5.5% | 3.5% | 7% | 1% | – | 24% | 2% | – | 13.5% | 4% | 20% | 1% | 1% | 1.5% | 3% | 1.5% |
| Ifop-Fiducial | 8–11 Apr 2019 | 1,395 | 58.5% | 1% | – | 9% | 3.5% | 5% | 3.5% | 7% | – | – | 22.5% | 2.5% | – | 13.5% | 5% | 22% | 1.5% | 1.5% | 1% | – | 1.5% |
| Ifop-Fiducial | 8–11 Apr 2019 | 1,395 | 58.5% | 1% | – | 8.5% | 3% | 5.5% | 3% | 7% | – | – | 22.5% | 2.5% | – | 13.5% | 4.5% | 21.5% | 1.5% | 1% | 1% | 3% | 1% |
| Ifop-Fiducial | 6–10 Apr 2019 | 1,401 | 58.5% | 1% | – | 9% | 3% | 5.5% | 3% | 7% | – | – | 22.5% | 2.5% | – | 13.5% | 4.5% | 21% | 1.5% | 1% | 1% | 3% | 1% |
| Ifop-Fiducial | 5–9 Apr 2019 | 1,396 | 58% | 1% | – | 8.5% | 2.5% | 5.5% | 3% | 7.5% | – | – | 22.5% | 3% | – | 13% | 4.5% | 21% | 2% | 1% | 0.5% | 3.5% | 1% |
| Ifop-Fiducial | 4–8 Apr 2019 | 1,370 | 58% | 1% | – | 8.5% | 2.5% | 5% | 3% | 7.5% | – | – | 23% | 3% | – | 13% | 4.5% | 20.5% | 2.5% | 1% | 0.5% | 3.5% | 1% |
| Harris Interactive | 5–6 Apr 2019 | 1,051 | – | 1% | – | 8.5% | 2% | 5.5% | 3.5% | 8% | – | – | 23% | 2% | – | 13% | 5% | 21% | 1.5% | 2% | 2% | – | 2% |
| Harris Interactive | 5–6 Apr 2019 | 1,051 | – | 1% | – | 8.5% | 2% | 5.5% | 3.5% | 8% | – | – | 23% | 2% | – | 12% | 5% | 20% | 1.5% | 2% | 1.5% | 3% | 1.5% |
| OpinionWay | 3–5 Apr 2019 | 968 | – | 2% | – | 8% | 2% | 6% | 3% | 7% | – | – | 22% | 3% | – | 14% | 5% | 22% | 1% | 1% | – | – | 4% |
| Ifop-Fiducial | 2–5 Apr 2019 | 1,368 | 58.5% | 1% | – | 8.5% | 2% | 5% | 3.5% | 7.5% | – | – | 23.5% | 2.5% | – | 13% | 5% | 21% | 2% | 1% | 0.5% | 3% | 1% |
| Ifop-Fiducial | 1–4 Apr 2019 | 1,373 | 59% | 1% | – | 8.5% | 2% | 5.5% | 3% | 7.5% | – | – | 23.5% | 2% | – | 13% | 5.5% | 22% | 2.5% | 1% | 1.5% | – | 1.5% |
| Ifop-Fiducial | 1–4 Apr 2019 | 1,373 | 59% | 1% | – | 8% | 2% | 5% | 3.5% | 7.5% | – | – | 23.5% | 2% | – | 13% | 5.5% | 21% | 2% | 1% | 1% | 3% | 1% |
| Ifop-Fiducial | 30 Mar–3 Apr 2019 | 1,370 | 59% | 1% | – | 8.5% | 2.5% | 5.5% | 3% | 7.5% | – | – | 23% | 1.5% | – | 13% | 5.5% | 21% | 2% | 0.5% | 1% | 3.5% | 1% |
| Ifop-Fiducial | 29 Mar–2 Apr 2019 | 1,397 | 59% | 1% | – | 8.5% | 2.5% | 5.5% | 3% | 8% | – | – | 23% | 1.5% | – | 13.5% | 5.5% | 20.5% | 1.5% | 0.5% | 1% | 3.5% | 1% |
| Ifop-Fiducial | 28 Mar–1 Apr 2019 | 1,370 | 59% | 1% | – | 8.5% | 2% | 5% | 3% | 8% | – | – | 22.5% | 2% | – | 14% | 5.5% | 21% | 1.5% | 0.5% | 1% | 3.5% | 1% |
| Ifop-Fiducial | 26–29 Mar 2019 | 1,366 | 58% | 1% | – | 8% | 2% | 5% | 3.5% | 8.5% | – | – | 22.5% | 1.5% | – | 14% | 5% | 21% | 2% | 0.5% | 0.5% | 4% | 1% |
| Ifop-Fiducial | 25–28 Mar 2019 | 1,361 | 58% | 1% | <0.5% | 8% | 2% | 5.5% | 3% | 8.5% | – | – | 22% | 1.5% | – | 14% | 5% | 21% | 2% | 1% | 0.5% | 4% | 1% |
| Elabe | 25–27 Mar 2019 | 1,201 | 56% | 0.5% | | 7.5% | 2% | 6% | 5% | 9% | – | – | 22.5% | 3.5% | – | 14% | 3% | 22% | 1% | 1% | – | – | 3% |
| Elabe | 25–27 Mar 2019 | 1,201 | 56% | 0.5% | | 7.5% | 2% | 5.5% | 5% | 9% | – | – | 23% | 3.5% | – | 12.5% | 3.5% | 21% | 1% | 1% | – | 2.5% | 2.5% |
| Ifop-Fiducial | 23–27 Mar 2019 | 1,382 | 58.5% | 1% | <0.5% | 8% | 2.5% | 5% | 3% | 8% | – | – | 22% | 2% | – | 14% | 5% | 20.5% | 1.5% | 1% | 0.5% | 5% | 1% |
| Ifop-Fiducial | 22–27 Mar 2019 | 1,860 | – | 1% | 0.5% | 8% | 2.5% | 5% | 3.5% | 8.5% | – | – | 21% | 2% | – | 14.5% | 6% | 21.5% | 1.5% | 1% | 1.5% | – | 2% |
| Ifop-Fiducial | 22–26 Mar 2019 | 1,402 | 58% | 1% | 0.5% | 8.5% | 2% | 5% | 3% | 8% | – | – | 22% | 2% | – | 14% | 5% | 20% | 1% | 1.5% | 0.5% | 5% | 1% |
| OpinionWay | 20–26 Mar 2019 | 1,889 | 59% | 2% | – | 7% | 3% | 6% | 2% | 7% | – | – | 23% | 3% | – | 13% | 6% | 23% | 1% | 1% | – | – | 3% |
| Ifop-Fiducial | 21–25 Mar 2019 | 1,409 | 58% | 1% | 0.5% | 8.5% | 2% | 5% | 3% | 7.5% | – | – | 22% | 2% | – | 14% | 4.5% | 20% | 0.5% | 2% | 1% | 5.5% | 1% |
| Harris Interactive | 22–23 Mar 2019 | 1,068 | – | 1% | 1% | 8% | 2% | 7% | 2.5% | 7% | – | – | 23% | 2% | – | 13% | 5% | 22% | 1.5% | 1.5% | 1.5% | – | 2% |
| Harris Interactive | 22–23 Mar 2019 | 1,068 | – | 1% | 0.5% | 8% | 1.5% | 7% | 2.5% | 7% | – | – | 23% | 2% | – | 13% | 5% | 21.5% | 1% | 1% | 1% | 3% | 2% |
| Ifop-Fiducial | 19–22 Mar 2019 | 1,390 | 59% | 1% | 0.5% | 8% | 2% | 6% | 3% | 7.5% | – | – | 23% | 2% | – | 13.5% | 4.5% | 20.5% | 0.5% | 1.5% | 0.5% | 5% | 1% |
| BVA | 20–21 Mar 2019 | 1,398 | 52% | 1.5% | 1% | 7.5% | 2% | 5% | 4% | 8.5% | – | – | 24% | 1.5% | – | 12% | 5% | 21% | 1% | 0.5% | 1.5% | 3% | 1% |
| Ifop-Fiducial | 18–21 Mar 2019 | 1,402 | 59.5% | 1% | 0.5% | 8% | 2% | 5.5% | 3.5% | 7.5% | – | – | 23.5% | 2% | – | 13% | 4.5% | 21% | 0.5% | 1% | 1% | 4.5% | 1% |
| Ipsos | 15–21 Mar 2019 | 10,049 | 58% | 0.5% | 1% | 8% | 2% | 6.5% | 4% | 8% | – | – | 23.5% | 2% | – | 12% | 5% | 22% | 0.5% | 1% | 1.5% | – | 2.5% |
| Ipsos | 15–21 Mar 2019 | 10,049 | 58% | 0.5% | 1% | 7.5% | 2% | 6.5% | 4% | 8% | – | – | 23.5% | 2% | – | 12% | 4.5% | 21% | 0.5% | 1% | 1.5% | 2.5% | 2% |
| Ifop-Fiducial | 16–20 Mar 2019 | 1,413 | 59.5% | 0.5% | 1% | 7.5% | 2% | 5.5% | 3.5% | 7.5% | – | – | 23.5% | 1.5% | – | 13% | 4.5% | 21.5% | 0.5% | 1% | 1.5% | 4% | 1.5% |
| Ifop-Fiducial | 15–19 Mar 2019 | 1,399 | 59% | 0.5% | 1% | 7.5% | 2% | 5.5% | 3.5% | 7.5% | – | – | 23.5% | 1.5% | – | 13% | 4.5% | 20.5% | 0.5% | 1% | 1.5% | 4.5% | 2% |
| Ifop-Fiducial | 14–18 Mar 2019 | 1,393 | 59% | 0.5% | 1% | 7.5% | 2% | 6% | 3% | 8% | – | – | 23.5% | 1.5% | – | 13.5% | 4.5% | 20.5% | 0.5% | 1% | 1.5% | 4% | 1.5% |
| Ifop-Fiducial | 12–15 Mar 2019 | 1,398 | 59% | 0.5% | 1% | 7% | 2% | 6% | 2.5% | 8.5% | – | – | 23.5% | 1.5% | – | 13.5% | 5% | 21% | 0.5% | 1% | 1.5% | 4% | 1% |
| Ifop-Fiducial | 10–14 Mar 2019 | 1,401 | 59% | 0.5% | 1% | 7.5% | 2% | 5.5% | 2.5% | 8.5% | – | – | 24% | 1.5% | – | 13.5% | 4.5% | 21% | 0.5% | 1% | 1% | 4% | 1.5% |
| Ifop-Fiducial | 9–13 Mar 2019 | 1,384 | 58% | 0.5% | 1% | 7.5% | 2% | 5.5% | 2.5% | 8.5% | – | – | 24% | 1.5% | – | 13% | 4.5% | 21.5% | 0.5% | 1% | 1% | 4% | 1.5% |
| Ifop-Fiducial | 8–12 Mar 2019 | 1,378 | 58% | 0.5% | 1% | 7.5% | 2% | 5.5% | 2.5% | 8% | – | – | 24.5% | 1.5% | – | 12.5% | 5% | 21.5% | 1% | 1% | 1.5% | 3.5% | 1% |
| Ifop-Fiducial | 7–11 Mar 2019 | 1,371 | 57.5% | 0.5% | 1% | 7% | 2% | 5.5% | 3% | 8% | – | – | 25% | 1.5% | – | 12.5% | 5% | 21.5% | 1% | 1% | 1.5% | 3% | 1% |
| Harris Interactive | 8–9 Mar 2019 | 1,090 | – | 2% | 1% | 9% | 2% | 5% | 3% | 8% | – | – | 22% | 1% | – | 14% | 5% | 21% | 2% | 1% | 1% | – | 3% |
| Harris Interactive | 8–9 Mar 2019 | 1,090 | – | 2% | 1% | 9% | 1% | 5% | 3% | 8% | – | – | 22% | 1% | – | 13% | 5% | 20% | 2% | 1% | 1% | 3% | 3% |
| Ifop-Fiducial | 5–8 Mar 2019 | 1,386 | 58% | 0.5% | 1% | 7% | 2% | 5% | 2.5% | 7.5% | – | – | 24.5% | 2.5% | – | 13% | 5% | 22% | 0.5% | 1.5% | 1.5% | 3% | 1% |
| Ifop-Fiducial | 4–7 Mar 2019 | 1,381 | 59% | 0.5% | 1% | 7% | 2.5% | 5% | 2% | 7.5% | – | – | 24% | 3% | – | 13% | 5.5% | 22% | 0.5% | 1.5% | 1% | 3% | 1% |
| Elabe | 25–27 Feb 2019 | 1,201 | 59% | 1% | | 8% | 2.5% | 5% | 3% | 10% | – | – | 22% | 2% | – | 13% | 5.5% | 22% | 1% | 1% | – | – | 4% |
| Elabe | 25–27 Feb 2019 | 1,201 | 59% | 1% | | 7% | 3% | 5% | 3% | 9% | – | – | 22% | 2.5% | – | 12% | 5% | 21.5% | 1% | 1% | – | 3% | 4% |
| OpinionWay | 20–27 Feb 2019 | 2,218 | 59% | 2% | – | 7% | 2% | 6% | 4% | 6% | – | – | 22% | 2% | – | 14% | 5% | 22% | 1% | 1% | – | – | 6% |
| Harris Interactive | 22–23 Feb 2019 | 1,064 | – | 1% | 2% | 8% | 2% | 6% | 4% | 8% | – | – | 22% | 2% | – | 12% | 6% | 20% | 1% | 1% | 1% | – | 4% |
| Harris Interactive | 22–23 Feb 2019 | 1,064 | – | 1% | 2% | 8% | 2% | 6% | 4% | 8% | – | – | 22% | 2% | – | 12% | 5% | 19% | 1% | 1% | 1% | 3% | 3% |
| BVA | 20–21 Feb 2019 | 929 | 50.5% | 1% | 1% | 7.5% | 2% | 5% | 3% | 9% | – | – | 25% | 2% | – | 10% | 6% | 19% | 1% | 0.5% | 1.5% | 4% | 2.5% |
| Ifop | 20–21 Feb 2019 | 1,004 | – | 1% | 1% | 6.5% | 2% | 5% | 4% | 8.5% | – | – | 22% | 3.5% | – | 10% | 6.5% | 23% | 1% | 0.5% | 2.5% | – | 3% |
| Ipsos | 15–21 Feb 2019 | 10,002 | 58% | 0.5% | 1% | 8.5% | 2% | 5.5% | 5.5% | 8.5% | – | – | 23% | 2.5% | – | 12% | 6.5% | 21% | 1% | 0.5% | 2% | – | – |
| Ipsos | 15–21 Feb 2019 | 10,002 | 58% | 0.5% | 1% | 8% | 2% | 5% | 5% | 8% | – | – | 23% | 2.5% | – | 12% | 6% | 19.5% | 1% | 0.5% | 1.5% | 4.5% | – |
| Ifop-Fiducial | 13–15 Feb 2019 | 1,367 | – | 1% | 1% | 7.5% | 3% | 6% | 3.5% | 9% | – | – | 24% | 2% | – | 10% | 6% | 20% | 1.5% | 0.5% | 2% | – | 3% |
| Ifop-Fiducial | 13–15 Feb 2019 | 1,367 | – | 1% | 1% | 7% | 2.5% | 6% | 3.5% | 8.5% | – | – | 24% | 2.5% | – | 10% | 6% | 20% | 1% | <0.5% | 1.5% | 3% | 2.5% |
| OpinionWay | 17–25 Jan 2019 | 1,810 | 57% | 1% | – | 8% | 2% | 6% | 4% | 8% | – | – | 20% | 3% | – | 12% | 7% | 22% | 1% | <1% | – | – | 6% |
| Elabe | 22–23 Jan 2019 | 1,000 | 70% | 0.5% | | 9.5% | 2% | 6% | 2% | 9% | – | – | 23.5% | 3% | – | 12.5% | 5% | 20.5% | 1.5% | 1% | – | – | 4% |
| Elabe | 22–23 Jan 2019 | 1,000 | 70% | 0.5% | | 8% | 2% | 5% | 1.5% | 8.5% | – | – | 22.5% | 3% | – | 11.5% | 3.5% | 17.5% | 0.5% | 1% | – | 13% | 2% |
| Ifop-Fiducial | 8–9 Jan 2019 | 934 | – | – | 1.5% | 9.5% | 2.5% | 4% | 2.5% | 6.5% | – | – | 23% | 3.5% | – | 10% | 7.5% | 21% | 1.5% | 0.5% | 3% | – | 3.5% |
| Ifop-Fiducial | 8–9 Jan 2019 | 934 | – | – | 1.5% | 7% | 2.5% | 4.5% | 2.5% | 6.5% | – | – | 23% | 3.5% | – | 10% | 6% | 18.5% | 1.5% | 0.5% | 2% | 7.5% | 3% |
| Odoxa | 19–20 Dec 2018 | 926 | – | – | 2.5% | 11.5% | 2% | 7% | 3% | 6.5% | – | – | 19% | 2.5% | – | 8% | 7% | 24% | 1% | 1% | 3% | – | 2% |
| Odoxa | 19–20 Dec 2018 | 926 | – | – | 3.5% | 10.5% | 1% | 6% | 3% | 6% | – | – | 19% | 2% | – | 8% | 7% | 21% | 1% | 1% | 2% | 8% | 1% |
| Ifop | 7–10 Dec 2018 | 938 | – | – | 1.5% | 9% | 2.5% | 4.5% | 3.5% | 8% | – | – | 18% | 3% | – | 11% | 8% | 24% | 1% | 0.5% | 2.5% | – | 3% |
| Ipsos* | 5–6 Dec 2018 | 957 | – | 1.5% | | 12% | 1% | 4% | 3.5% | 14% | – | – | 21% | 3% | – | 12.5% | 6% | 17% | 0.5% | 0.5% | 3.5% | – | – |
| Ipsos* | 5–6 Dec 2018 | 957 | – | 1% | | 9% | 1.5% | 3% | 3% | 13% | – | – | 21% | 3% | – | 11% | 4.5% | 14% | 0.5% | 0.5% | 3% | 12% | – |
| BVA | 26 Nov–6 Dec 2018 | 5,456 | 52.5% | – | 1% | 10% | 2% | 5% | 5% | 7% | – | – | 20% | 3% | – | 12% | 7% | 21% | 1% | 1% | 2% | – | 3% |
| Ifop* | 3–4 Dec 2018 | 944 | – | – | 1.5% | 11.5% | 14% | | | | – | – | 15% | 4% | – | 13% | 7.5% | 23.5% | 1% | 1% | 2% | – | 6% |
| Ifop* | 3–4 Dec 2018 | 944 | – | – | 1.5% | 11.5% | 11.5% | | | 4% | – | – | 16% | 4.5% | – | 12.5% | 8% | 24% | 0.5% | 1% | 1.5% | – | 3.5% |
| Ifop | 9–12 Nov 2018 | 945 | – | – | 1% | 10% | 2% | 6% | 3% | 7% | – | – | 19% | 4% | – | 13% | 6% | 22% | 1% | 1% | 2% | – | 3% |
| Elabe | 6–7 Nov 2018 | 1,002 | 56% | 0.5% | | 11% | 2.5% | 7% | 2.5% | 7% | – | – | 19.5% | 4% | – | 15% | 6.5% | 20% | 1% | 0.5% | – | – | 3% |
| Ifop | 30–31 Oct 2018 | 905 | – | – | 2% | 11% | 2% | 7.5% | 2.5% | 7% | – | – | 19% | 3% | – | 13% | 7% | 21% | 1% | 1% | – | – | 3% |
| Ifop | 25–29 Oct 2018 | 1,382 | – | – | 1% | 11% | 3% | 6% | 3% | 7% | – | – | 20% | 3% | – | 14% | 6.5% | 20% | 1% | 1.5% | – | – | 3% |
| Odoxa | 12–13 Sep 2018 | 907 | – | – | 1% | 12.5% | 1.5% | 4.5% | 4% | 5% | – | – | 21.5% | 3% | – | 14% | 6% | 21% | 1.5% | 1% | 1% | – | 2.5% |
| Ifop-Fiducial | 30–31 Aug 2018 | 1,403 | – | – | 2% | 14% | 2% | 6% | 3% | 7.5% | – | – | 20% | 2.5% | – | 15% | 6.5% | 17% | 1% | 0.5% | – | – | 3% |
| Ifop-Fiducial | 30–31 Aug 2018 | 1,403 | – | – | 2% | 14% | 2% | 6% | 3% | 7.5% | – | – | 21% | – | 4% | 14% | 6.5% | 17% | 0.5% | 0.5% | – | – | 2% |
| Ipsos | 27 Jun–2 Jul 2018 | 998 | 58% | 1% | 1% | 13% | 1% | 4% | 4% | 4% | – | – | 26% | 3% | | 15% | 7% | 18% | 1% | 1% | 1% | – | – |
| Ifop-Fiducial | 25–27 Jun 2018 | 1,374 | – | – | 1% | 11% | 2.5% | 6% | 3% | 6% | – | – | 23% | 2.5% | | 15% | 6% | 19% | 1% | 1% | – | – | 3% |
| Elabe | 29–30 May 2018 | 1,004 | 67% | 1% | | 10% | 1% | 6% | 1.5% | 8% | – | – | 24% | 2% | | 15% | 5.5% | 19.5% | 1.5% | 1% | – | – | 4% |
| Harris Interactive | 22–23 May 2018 | 1,673 | – | 1% | | 12% | 2% | 8% | 2% | 4% | – | – | 28% | 2% | | 13% | 7% | 15% | 1% | 1% | 1% | – | 3% |
| Viavoice* | 7–11 May 2018 | 1,506 | – | 2% | 2% | 9% | 1% | 6% | 7% | 9% | – | – | 32% | – | – | 12% | 6% | 14% | – | – | – | – | – |
| Viavoice* | 7–11 May 2018 | 1,506 | – | 3% | 2% | 11% | 2% | 7% | 13% | | – | – | 33% | – | – | 11% | 6% | 12% | – | – | – | – | – |
| Ifop | 7–9 May 2018 | 920 | – | – | 2% | 14% | – | 7% | 3% | 3% | – | – | 27% | – | – | 15% | 6% | 17% | 1% | 1% | 1% | – | 3% |
| Ifop | 7–9 May 2018 | 920 | – | 2% | | 13% | 2% | 8% | – | 4% | – | – | 27% | 3% | | 13% | 6% | 17% | 1% | 1% | – | – | 3% |
| Ifop | 29 Nov–1 Dec 2017 | 1,007 | – | 1% | | 14% | 2% | 8% | – | 4% | – | – | 26% | 3.5% | | 12% | 6% | 17% | 2% | 1.5% | – | – | 3% |
| 2014 election | 25 May 2014 | – | 57.57% | 1.17% | 0.39% | 6.61% (FG) | | 16.88% | – | 10.41% | | – | 9.94% (L'Alt.) | | – | 20.81% | 3.82% | 24.86% | – | 0.41% | – | – | 4.02% |

== See also ==
- Opinion polling for the 2014 European Parliament election in France
- Opinion polling for the 2009 European Parliament election in France

== Notes ==
Additional lists
