= Opinion polling for the 2014 European Parliament election in France =

This page lists public opinion polls conducted for the 2014 European Parliament election in France, which was held on 25 May 2014.

Unless otherwise noted, all polls listed below are compliant with the regulations of the national polling commission (Commission nationale des sondages) and utilize the quota method.

== Graphical summary ==
The averages in the graphs below were constructed using polls listed below conducted by the eight major French pollsters. The graphs are smoothed 14-day weighted moving averages, using only the most recent poll conducted by any given pollster within that range (each poll weighted based on recency).

National results for LO, NPA, ND, EC, AEI, NC, FV, and DLR lists were not provided by the Ministry of the Interior in the 2014 European elections. These lists, respectively, received 1.17%, 0.39%, 2.90%, 0.67%, 1.12%, 1.41%, 0.74%, and 3.82% of the vote in the 8, 5, 7, 6, 5, 7, 8, and 8 constituencies, respectively, in which they presented lists.

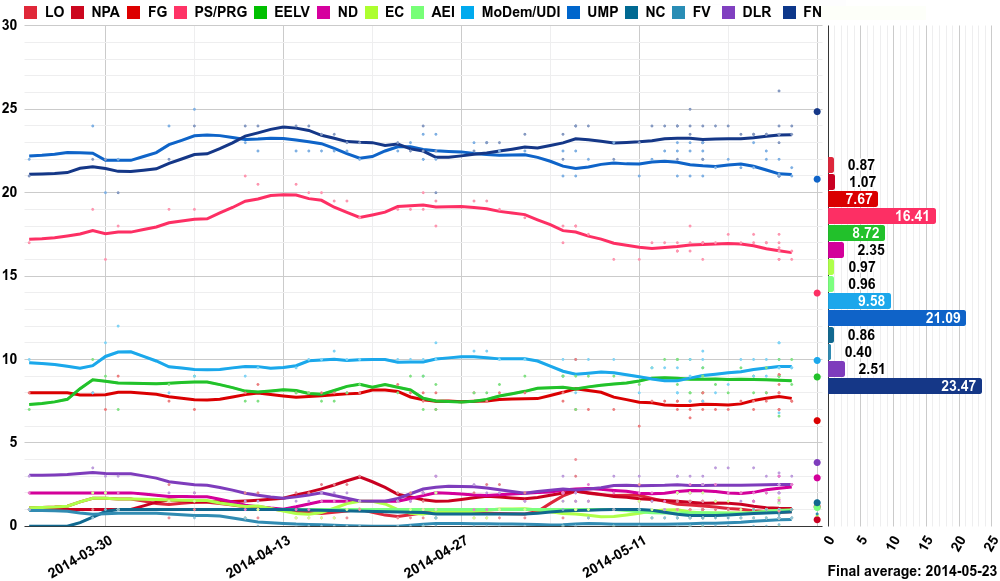

== Voting intentions ==
Starting on 10 April 2014, Ifop-Fiducial published a "rolling" poll for Paris Match which is listed in the tables below as "Ifop-Fiducial" without an asterisk, while separate polls not conducted as part of the "rolling" poll are listed with an asterisk (*).

Regionalist lists received 0.25% of the vote in 2009; this total is included in that for other lists, which would otherwise have been 4.45%.

Polling firm	Fieldwork date	Sample size	Abs.	LO	NPA	FG	PS PRG	DVG	EELV	ND	EC	AEI	MoDem	UDI	UMP	NC	FV	DLR	DVD	FN	EXD	DIV
2014 election	25 May 2014	–	57.57%	1.60% (EXG)		6.33%	13.98%	3.18%	8.95%	(DVG)	(DIV)	(DIV)	9.94%		20.81%	(DVD)	(DVD)	(DVD)	5.98%	24.86%	0.01%	4.37%
Ipsos	22–23 May 2014	1,547	58%	1%	1%	7.5%	16.5%	–	8.5%	2.5%	1%	–	9.5%		21%	1%	0.5%	3%	–	24%	–	3%
Ifop-Fiducial	20–23 May 2014	1,691	57.5%	0.5%	1%	7.5%	16%	–	10%	2.5%	1%	0.5%	9.5%		21.5%	–	0.5%	2.5%	1%	23.5%	–	2.5%
Ipsos	21–22 May 2014	1,561	58.5%	0.5%	1%	8.5%	17.5%	–	9%	1.5%	1%	–	9.5%		21%	0.5%	0.5%	3%	–	24%	–	2.5%
CSA	20–22 May 2014	1,897	60%	1%	1%	8%	16%	–	9%	2%	<0.5%	–	10%		21%	0.5%	0.5%	2%	–	23.5%	–	5.5%
Harris Interactive	20–22 May 2014	1,431	–	0.5%	1%	7%	16%	–	9%	3%	1%	–	11%		21%	1%	–	2%	–	23%	–	4.5%
Ipsos	20–22 May 2014	1,540	58.5%	0.5%	1.5%	8%	17.5%	–	9%	1.5%	1%	–	9.5%		21.5%	0.5%	<0.5%	3%	–	23.5%	–	3%
OpinionWay	20–22 May 2014	2,948	60%	1%	1%	7%	17%	–	9%	3%	1%	1%	11%		21%	1%	0.5%	2.5%	–	21%	–	3%
Ifop-Fiducial	19–22 May 2014	1,691	58.5%	0.5%	1%	8%	16.5%	–	10%	2.5%	0.5%	0.5%	9.5%		22%	–	0.5%	2.5%	0.5%	23.5%	–	2%
YouGov	19–22 May 2014	1,092	55%	0.9%	1.4%	9.1%	16.7%	–	6.6%	1.6%	1.7%	1.4%	6.8%		21.1%	0.7%	0.1%	3.2%	–	26.1%	–	2.7%
Ipsos	19–21 May 2014	1,266	58.5%	1%	1%	7.5%	17%	–	8%	2%	1%	–	9%		22.5%	1%	<0.5%	3%	–	23.5%	–	3.5%
Ifop-Fiducial	16–21 May 2014	1,691	58.5%	0.5%	1%	8%	17%	–	9.5%	2%	1%	0.5%	10%		22%	–	0.5%	2%	0.5%	23.5%	–	2%
Ipsos	16–20 May 2014	1,545	59%	1%	1%	7%	17%	–	8%	1.5%	1%	–	9%		23%	1%	<0.5%	3.5%	–	23.5%	–	3.5%
Ifop-Fiducial	15–20 May 2014	1,610	59.5%	0.5%	1.5%	7.5%	17.5%	–	9%	2%	1%	0.5%	10%		21.5%	–	0.5%	1.5%	1%	23.5%	–	2.5%
Ifop-Fiducial	14–19 May 2014	1,507	60%	0.5%	2%	7.5%	17%	–	9.5%	2%	1%	0.5%	10%		21.5%	–	0.5%	1.5%	1%	23.5%	–	2%
Ipsos	15–18 May 2014	1,538	59.5%	1%	1%	7%	17.5%	–	8%	2%	1.5%	–	8.5%		22%	0.5%	<0.5%	3.5%	–	24%	–	3.5%
Ipsos	14–17 May 2014	1,516	59.5%	1.5%	1%	7%	17%	–	8.5%	2.5%	1.5%	–	8%		21.5%	0.5%	<0.5%	3.5%	–	24%	–	3.5%
BVA	15–16 May 2014	1,045	–	1%	1%	8%	17%	–	9%	1.5%	1%	–	9.5%		21%	1%	1%	2%	–	23%	–	4%
OpinionWay	14–16 May 2014	1,017	63%	1%	1%	8%	16%	–	9%	2.5%	<1%	–	10.5%		23%	0.5%	<1%	2.5%	–	22%	–	4%
Ifop-Fiducial	13–16 May 2014	1,424	60%	0.5%	1.5%	7.5%	17%	–	9.5%	2.5%	0.5%	0.5%	10%		22%	–	<0.5%	1.5%	1%	23%	–	3%
Ipsos	13–16 May 2014	1,507	60%	1.5%	1%	7%	17%	–	8%	2.5%	2%	–	7.5%		22.5%	0.5%	0.5%	3%	–	24%	–	3%
CSA	13–15 May 2014	994	64%	1%	1.5%	6.5%	18%	–	8%	2%	<0.5%	–	9%		21%	<0.5%	<0.5%	2%	–	25%	–	6%
Ifop-Fiducial	12–15 May 2014	1,407	60.5%	0.5%	1%	7.5%	16.5%	–	10%	2%	1%	0.5%	10%		22.5%	–	<0.5%	1.5%	1%	23.5%	–	2.5%
Ipsos	12–15 May 2014	1,507	61%	1%	1.5%	7%	17%	–	8%	2.5%	2%	–	7.5%		23%	0.5%	0.5%	3%	–	24%	–	2.5%
Harris Interactive	12–14 May 2014	1,429	–	1%	2%	7%	16.5%	–	10%	2%	1%	–	8%		21%	1%	–	3%	–	22%	–	5.5%
Ipsos	12–14 May 2014	1,007	62%	1%	1.5%	7.5%	17%	–	8.5%	2%	2%	–	8%		23%	0.5%	0.5%	3%	–	24%	–	1.5%
Ifop-Fiducial	9–14 May 2014	1,311	60.5%	0.5%	1%	7.5%	16.5%	–	10%	2%	1%	0.5%	9.5%		22.5%	–	<0.5%	1.5%	1%	24%	–	2.5%
Ifop-Fiducial	7–13 May 2014	1,206	61%	0.5%	1%	7.5%	17%	–	10%	1.5%	1%	0.5%	9.5%		22.5%	–	0.5%	1%	1%	24%	–	2.5%
Ifop-Fiducial	6–12 May 2014	1,118	61%	0.5%	1.5%	7.5%	17%	–	9.5%	2%	1%	0.5%	9.5%		22%	–	0.5%	1.5%	1%	24%	–	2%
TNS Sofres	9–11 May 2014	1,504	59%	2.5%	1.5%	6%	16%	–	8.5%	2%	1.5%	1%	8%		21%	1%	<0.5%	3%	–	23%	–	5%
OpinionWay	5–9 May 2014	1,961	62%	1%	1%	7%	16%	–	9%	2%	<1%	–	10%		23%	1%	<1%	3%	–	22%	–	5%
Ifop-Fiducial	2–7 May 2014	1,076	61%	0.5%	1.5%	7%	17.5%	–	9%	2.5%	1%	–	10%		22%	–	0.5%	1.5%	1%	24%	–	2%
Ifop-Fiducial	30 Apr–6 May 2014	1,036	61.5%	1%	1.5%	7%	18%	–	9%	2%	1%	–	10%		22.5%	–	<0.5%	1.5%	0.5%	24%	–	2%
YouGov	28 Apr–6 May 2014	1,069	–	4%	3%	10%	18%	–	7%	–	1%	–	8%		21%	–	0%	2%	–	24%	–	2%
Harris Interactive	2–5 May 2014	1,600	–	2%	2%	8%	17%	–	9%	2%	<0.5%	–	9%		21%	1%	<0.5%	3%	–	22%	–	4%
Ifop-Fiducial	30 Apr–5 May 2014	989	62%	0.5%	2%	7.5%	18%	–	9%	2%	1.5%	–	10%		22.5%	–	<0.5%	1.5%	0.5%	23.5%	–	1.5%
Ifop-Fiducial	28 Apr–2 May 2014	989	62.5%	0.5%	2%	8%	18.5%	–	9%	1.5%	1%	–	10%		22.5%	–	<0.5%	1.5%	–	23.5%	–	2%
Ifop-Fiducial	25–30 Apr 2014	993	63%	0.5%	2.5%	8%	19%	–	8.5%	1%	1%	–	10%		22.5%	–	<0.5%	2%	–	23%	–	2%
Ifop-Fiducial	24–29 Apr 2014	993	63%	0.5%	2.5%	7.5%	19.5%	–	8%	1%	0.5%	–	10.5%		23%	–	<0.5%	2%	–	23%	–	2%
Ifop-Fiducial	23–28 Apr 2014	997	62.5%	0.5%	2%	8%	19.5%	–	8%	1%	0.5%	–	10.5%		23%	–	<0.5%	2.5%	–	22.5%	–	2%
OpinionWay	23–25 Apr 2014	1,830	60%	1%	1%	7%	18%	–	7%	3%	2%	1%	11%		22%	0.5%	0.5%	3%	–	20%	–	3%
Ifop-Fiducial	22–25 Apr 2014	997	62%	0.5%	2%	8%	19.5%	–	8.5%	1%	0.5%	–	10%		23.5%	–	<0.5%	2%	–	22.5%	–	2%
CSA	22–24 Apr 2014	1,005	65%	1%	1.5%	7.5%	20%	–	7%	2%	<0.5%	–	9%		22%	1%	<0.5%	2%	–	24%	–	3%
Ifop-Fiducial	21–24 Apr 2014	1,000	61.5%	0.5%	2%	8%	19%	–	9%	1%	1%	–	10%		23.5%	–	<0.5%	2%	–	22.5%	–	1.5%
Ifop-Fiducial	18–23 Apr 2014	984	61%	0.5%	2%	8%	19%	–	9%	1.5%	1%	–	10%		23%	–	<0.5%	1.5%	–	22.5%	–	2%
Ifop-Fiducial	17–22 Apr 2014	980	60.5%	0.5%	2%	8.5%	19%	–	8%	1.5%	1.5%	–	10%		22.5%	–	<0.5%	1.5%	–	23%	–	2%
Ifop-Fiducial*	15–19 Apr 2014	1,869	–	1%	3%	8%	18.5%	–	8.5%	1.5%	1.5%	–	10%		22%	–	<0.5%	1.5%	–	23%	–	1.5%
Ifop-Fiducial	15–18 Apr 2014	989	60%	0.5%	2.5%	8%	19.5%	–	8%	1.5%	1%	–	10%		22.5%	–	<0.5%	2%	–	23%	–	1.5%
Ifop-Fiducial	14–17 Apr 2014	989	60%	0.5%	2.5%	8%	19.5%	–	7.5%	1.5%	0.5%	–	10.5%		22.5%	–	<0.5%	2%	–	23.5%	–	1.5%
Ifop-Fiducial	11–16 Apr 2014	990	60.5%	0.5%	2.5%	8%	20%	–	7.5%	1.5%	0.5%	–	10%		22.5%	–	<0.5%	2%	–	23.5%	–	1.5%
Ifop-Fiducial	10–15 Apr 2014	999	61%	0.5%	2%	8%	20%	–	8%	1%	0.5%	–	10%		22.5%	–	<0.5%	1.5%	–	24%	–	2%
Ifop-Fiducial	9–14 Apr 2014	1,008	61.5%	0.5%	2%	8%	20.5%	–	8%	1%	0.5%	–	9.5%		22.5%	–	<0.5%	1.5%	–	24%	–	2%
Ifop-Fiducial	8–11 Apr 2014	1,002	61.5%	0.5%	2%	8.5%	20.5%	–	7.5%	1%	1%	–	9.5%		22.5%	–	<0.5%	1.5%	–	24%	–	1.5%
Ifop-Fiducial	7–10 Apr 2014	997	61%	0.5%	2%	8%	21%	–	7.5%	1%	0.5%	–	9%		23%	–	0.5%	1.5%	–	24%	–	1.5%
TNS Sofres	4–6 Apr 2014	1,501	–	2%	1%	7%	19%	–	9%	–	1.5%	–	9%		25%	–	0.5%	2%	–	24%	–	–
Ifop	31 Mar–4 Apr 2014	1,872	–	0.5%	2.5%	7.5%	19%	–	8.5%	1.5%	1.5%	–	8%		24%	–	–	2%	–	22%	–	3%
OpinionWay	31 Mar 2014	1,053	–	1%	1%	9%	18%	–	7%	2%	–	1%	12%		22%	1%	–	3%	–	20%	–	3%
Harris Interactive	30 Mar 2014	3,000	–	2%		7%	16%	–	9%	2%	2%	–	11%		20%	1%	–	3%	–	22%	–	5%
Ipsos	27–29 Mar 2014	1,533	–	2%	1%	8%	19%	–	10%	–	2%	–	8%		24%	–	0.5%	3.5%	–	22%	–	–
OpinionWay	23–24 Mar 2014	1,158	–	1%	1%	8%	17%	–	7%	2%		–	10%		22%	–	1%	3%	–	21%	–	7%
OpinionWay	7–11 Mar 2014	1,008	–	1%	3%	9%	17%	–	7%	1%	1%	–	9%		22%	0%	1%	4%	–	21%	–	4%
OpinionWay	12–14 Feb 2014	2,104	–	–	4%	9%	16%	–	9%	–	–	–	12%		22%	–	–	3%	–	20%	–	5%
Ifop	14–17 Jan 2014	1,894	–	–	2%	9%	18%	–	7%	–	–	–	11%		21%	–	–	2.5%	–	23%	–	6.5%
Ifop	1–4 Oct 2013	1,893	–	–	2%	10%	19%	–	6%	–	–	–	11%		22%	–	–	2%	–	24%	–	4%
YouGov	7–12 Jun 2013	1,014	–	–	2%	15%	15%	5%	7%	–	–	–	8%	5%	19%	–	–	–	6%	18%	–	–
CSA	21 May–12 Jun 2013	3,952	–	1%	3%	9%	19%	–	8%	–	–	–	7%	6%	23%	–	–	1%	–	20%	–	3%
Ifop	29–31 May 2013	1,869	–	–	2%	9%	21%	–	7.5%	–	–	–	7%	6.5%	21%	–	–	3%	–	21%	–	2%
Harris Interactive	22–24 May 2013	1,279	–	2%		8%	21%	–	10%	–	–	–	6%	8%	23%	–	–	1%	–	18%	–	3%
2009 election	7 Jun 2009	–	59.37%	6.10% (EXG)		6.05%	16.48%	0.46%	16.28%	–	–	(DIV)	8.46%	–	27.88%	–	–	(DVD)	6.74%	6.34%	0.51%	4.70%

=== By constituency ===
==== Est ====
Polling firm	Fieldwork date	Sample size	Abs.	LO	NPA	FG	PS PRG	EELV	ND	EC	AEI	MoDem	UDI	UMP	NC	FV	DLR	FN	DIV
2014 election	25 May 2014	–	56.85%	1.36%	0.33%	5.24%	13.24%	6.41%	2.44%	0.37%	2.34%	9.19%		22.72%	1.29%	0.53%	4.16%	28.98%	1.38%
Ifop	15–19 Apr 2014	666	–	1.5%	3%	6.5%	15.5%	12.5%	1.5%	–	–	7.5%		24%	–	–	0.5%	26%	1.5%

==== Île-de-France ====
Polling firm	Fieldwork date	Sample size	Abs.	LO	NPA	FG	PS PRG	EELV	ND	EC	AEI	MoDem	UDI	UMP	NC	FV	DLR	FN	DIV
2014 election	25 May 2014	–	61.02%	0.85%	0.84%	6.48%	14.28%	9.68%	3.06%	2.34%	1.74%	11.99%		21.79%	2.16%	1.20%	3.82%	17.00%	2.79%
Ifop-Fiducial	14–19 May 2014	703	–	0.5%	3.5%	7%	17%	9%	2.5%	1.5%	0.5%	10%		21%	2%	<0.5%	2.5%	20%	3%

==== Sud-Est ====
Polling firm	Fieldwork date	Sample size	Abs.	LO	NPA	FG	PS PRG	EELV	ND	EC	AEI	MoDem	UDI	UMP	NC	FV	DLR	FN	R&PS	DIV
2014 election	25 May 2014	–	57.04%	0.90%	–	5.96%	11.88%	9.32%	3.15%	–	2.14%	8.44%		22.40%	1.50%	0.43%	3.92%	28.18%	0.75%	1.03%
Ifop	23–28 Apr 2014	686	–	1%	2%	7%	13%	11%	1.5%	1%	–	8.5%		28%	<0.5%	<0.5%	2.5%	23%	1.5%	<0.5%
OpinionWay	19–21 Feb 2014	1,052	–	–	2%	9%	15%	9%	–	–	–	8%		25%	–	–	3%	26%	–	3%

== See also ==
- Opinion polling for the 2019 European Parliament election in France
- Opinion polling for the 2009 European Parliament election in France
