= Jean Sennep =

French caricaturist and illustrator

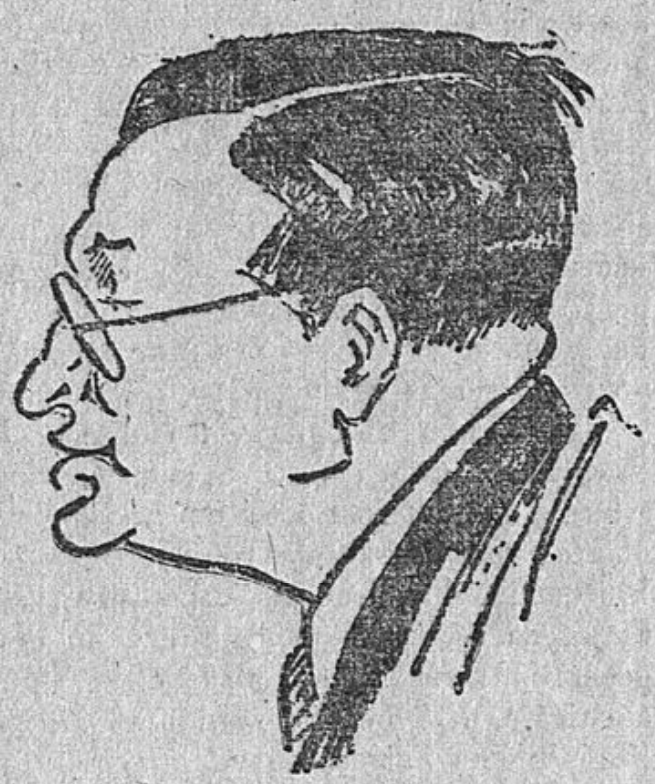
- Born: Jean-Jacques Charles Pennès; June 3, 1894; Paris
- Died: July 9, 1982 (aged 88); Saint-Germain-en-Laye
- Other names: J. Sennep, Jean Sennep, Jehan Sennep, Jean-Jacques Charles Sennep
- Occupation: Caricaturist
- Employer: Le Figaro

Jean-Jacques Charles Pennès, known as Jean Sennep or Jehan Sennep, born in Paris on 3 June 1894 and died in Saint-Germain-en-Laye (Yvelines) on 9 July 1982, was a French press cartoonist and caricaturist.

He is regarded as one of the greatest illustrators in the French press. A political conservative who consistently expressed his anti-communism through his cartoons, he contributed to numerous newspapers, including L'Action française, L'Écho de Paris, Candide, Aux écoutes, and Le Figaro.

== Biography ==
Mobilized during the First World War, he emerged deeply scarred by trench warfare and retained a profound aversion to Germany. After the war, he worked for a time as an office employee at the Gas Company, then became a journalist at Le Matin and began his career as a caricaturist at Le Rire.

In the 1920s he joined the daily newspaper Action française, where he illustrated several anti-Republican pamphlets by Léon Daudet. His work was nevertheless scorned by Charles Maurras, who decided to relegate his cartoons to the last page. He gradually distanced himself from Action française, which he left permanently in 1926. Beginning in 1924, he became particularly active against the Cartel des gauches government and multiplied his collaborations (La Liberté, L'Écho de Paris, and Candide). The caricatures he drew of left-wing political figures during this period became especially well known: "Aristide Briand is depicted as a senile and stubborn old man who betrays France; Édouard Herriot, whose corpulence is exaggerated to the extreme, becomes vain to the point of megalomania; Léon Blum is portrayed as an austere figure, so frail and indecisive that the artist frequently depicts him as a woman."

In June 1926 he became editor of Le Charivari, a position he held for one year.

A virulent anti-communist and fierce opponent of the Popular Front, Sennep was nevertheless hostile to Nazi Germany and expressed skepticism regarding the Munich Agreements. Likewise, when the left-wing cartoonist Cabrol was attacked by Hitler because of a caricature published in a Luxembourg newspaper, Sennep supported his fellow cartoonist.

His deeply anti-German feelings led him to reject both the Collaboration and the Vichy regime, even though many of his former colleagues supported them. He nevertheless continued to publish in Candide, a Pétainist newspaper, while secretly drawing anti-Vichy caricatures that were published after the Liberation.

Immediately after the war, in the context of attempts at national reconciliation, an album of caricatures entitled History of France, 1918–1938 was published, presenting in equal measure the viewpoints of Sennep, the best-known right-wing caricaturist, and H. P. Gassier, the celebrated communist caricaturist.

Following the Liberation, he briefly contributed to Le Canard enchaîné and also worked for the weekly Action. Until his retirement in 1967, he served as the principal editorial cartoonist for Le Figaro. For several years, and at least until the end of the 1970s, the weekly magazine Point de Vue – Images du Monde published one of Sennep's caricatures in every issue.

His caricature style was highly academic: refined, with elegant linework, and characterized by extreme exaggeration of his subjects' physical features. Overweight figures became enormous, thin figures almost skeletal, and his subjects—most often politicians—were frequently given deformities alluding to their office or to current events affecting them. For example, he transformed Jean-Jacques Servan-Schreiber into a nuclear mushroom cloud to mock his campaign against French nuclear weapons testing in the 1970s.

He influenced many caricaturists, notably Jean Effel and Jacques Faizant. He is also mentioned in the 221st of the 480 recollections listed by Georges Perec in Je me souviens.

== Family ==
He was the brother of General Roger Jean Eugène Pennès (1883–1975).

== Publications ==
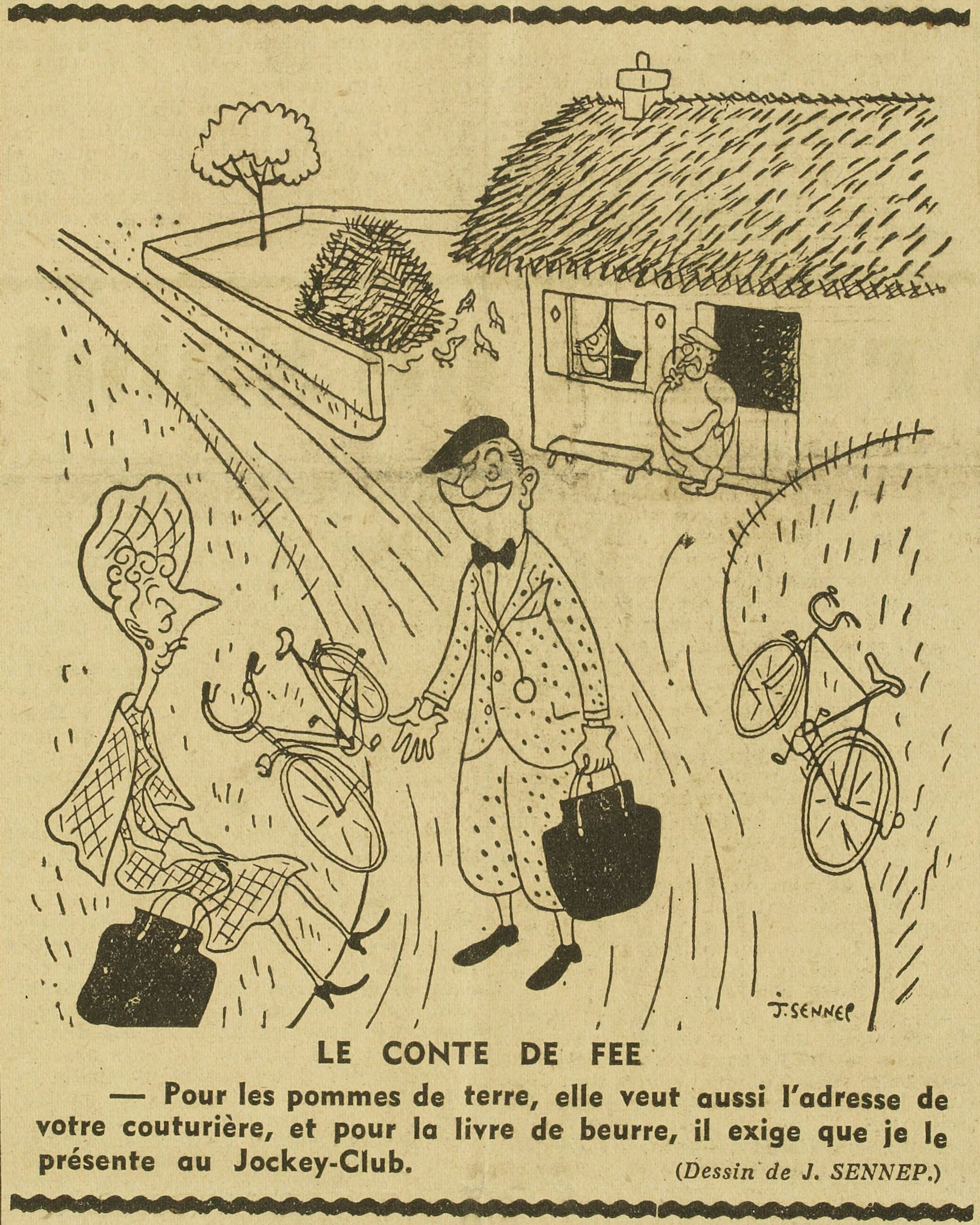
Sennep cartoon published in Candide, No. 999 (19 May 1943).

- Cartel et Cie: Unpublished Caricatures. Éditions Brossard, Paris, 1926.
- Twenty Fables of La Fontaine, illustrated by Jehan Sennep. Librairie de France, Paris, 1927.
- To the Great Men... A Grateful Sennep: Historical Album. Bossard, 1927.
- To the Slaughterhouse with the Cartelists!!... Souvenir Album of the 1928 Elections. Bossard, 1928.
- At the End of the Quay: Grand Album of Caricatures, A Concise Course in Parliamentary History. P. Bossard, 1929.
- Parliamentary Termites. Éditions du Capitole, 1930.
- The Dwarf of Lorraine: Raymond Poincaré. Éditions du Capitole, 1930.
- The Palace of Police. Éditions du Capitole, Paris, 1931.
- The Underworld. Preface by René Benjamin. Floury, 1934.
- The Laughter Ledger of Stavisky. 1934.
- Pierre, Édouard and Léon (Pierre Laval, Édouard Herriot and Léon Blum). Album du Nouveau Cri, 1936.
- Vichy. Monte Carlo, 1943.
- Sennep. Les Grands Humoristes, no. 4. Preface by Léo Larguier. Art et Livre, Monte Carlo, 1943.
- Monte-Carlo Album. Éditions du Livre, 1943.
- The War in the Black Shirt. Chantal, Paris and Toulouse, 1945.
- With Honor and Dignity: Memories of Vichy. Franc-Tireur, 1945.
- Starting from Zero (The Birth of the Fourth Republic). Bordas, 1947.
- From Vincent to René. Robert Laffont, Paris, 1954.
- The Birth of Europe. Satirix, 1971.
- The Art of the Day After Tomorrow. Satirix, 1972.
