= Marc Joulaud =

French politician (born 1967)

Marc Joulaud MEP
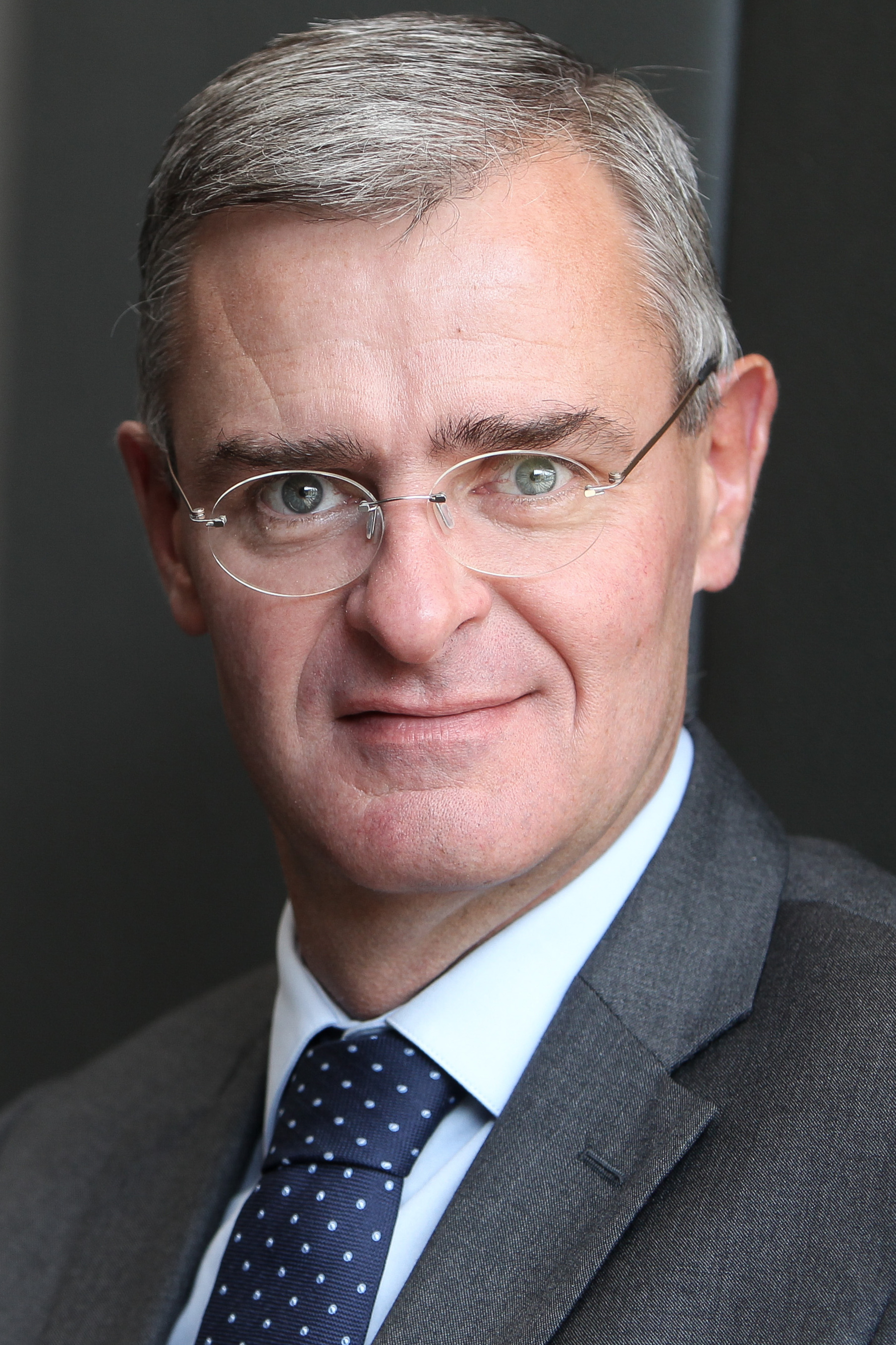
- Joulaud in 2014

Member of the European Parliament for West France
- In office 1 July 2014 – 1 July 2019
- Majority: European People's Party

Mayor of Sablé-sur-Sarthe
- In office 9 March 2008 – 3 July 2020
- Preceded by: Pierre Touchard
- Succeeded by: Nicolas Leudière

Member of the National Assembly for Sarthe's 4th constituency
- In office 19 July 2002 – 19 June 2012
- Preceded by: François Fillon
- Succeeded by: Sylvie Tolmont

Personal details
- Born: 3 September 1967 (age 59) Mayenne, Mayenne, FR
- Party: Les Républicains
- Education: University of Maine (France)
- Website: marcjoulaud.eu

Marc Joulaud (born 3 September 1967) is a French politician who served as Member of the European Parliament for the West France constituency from 2014 until 2019. He is a member of the French center right party Les Républicains (LR). He was given a suspended three-year sentence due to the Fillon affair.

== Early life and education ==
Joulaud studied law, first at the Maine University in Le Mans where he obtained a public law bachelor. He also obtained a master's degree in the same field at Université Paris-1 Panthéon-Sorbonne. He finished his studies at Sciences Po Paris, where he specialised in local government.

== Career ==
In 1992, Jouland started working with François Fillon, at that time mayor of Sablé-sur-Sarthe, as special advisor, which marked the beginning of a long cooperation between the two men. From 1992 to 1995, Marc Joulaud was François Fillon’s parliamentary assistant. In 1995 and 1998, when Fillon was elected president of the Conseil general de la Sarthe and Conseil régional des Pays de la Loire, Joulaud followed him as his closest advisor.

=== Career in national politics ===
Joulaud began his own political career in 2001 when he became city councillor of Sablé-sur-Sarthe. He also became vice-president of the Communauté de commune de Sablé-sur-Sarthe (community of communes).

On 9 June 2002, Joulaud became substitute deputy MP of the 4th constituency of Sarthe, after François Fillon’s election as MP (With 55,21% of the ballot at the first round). He finally became MP on 19 July 2002, after the nomination of François Fillon as a member of the government. During his entire mandate he was a member of the UMP group at the Assemblée Nationale (National Assembly) and a member of the Defence committee. In this committee he was in charge of the monitoring of the credit execution. He was also vice-president of the friendship group between France and Slovenia.

For the 2007 national elections, Joulaud was again appointed as Fillon’s deputy MP in the same constituency. François Fillon and Marc Joulaud were re-elected on the 10 June 2007 with 53,40% of the ballots at the first round, and Fillon was confirmed as French Prime Minister on the 19 June. Joulaud returned as an MP on 20 July 2007 and returned in his previous political group and committee, but became president of the friendship group between France and Sierra-Leone.

On 9 March 2008 Joulaud won the municipal election of Sablé-sur-Sarthe, once again in the first round, and was elected mayor by the city council on 14 March.

Candidate for the first time on his own name in the 2012 elections, Joulaud obtained 31,67 % of the ballot at the first round and accessed to the second round. On 17 June 2012, the second turn is on-going but after a long campaign, he obtained 40,55% of the votes while his rival Stephane Le Foll won the election with 59,45% of the votes.

On 28 September 2012, after Fillon's resignation, he was elected President of the Communauté de commune de Sablé-sur-Sarthe at the absolute majority, with 56 votes.

=== Member of the European Parliament, 2014–2019 ===
As a candidate for the European elections of 2014, Joulaud was at the 3rd place on the UMP list, after Alain Cadec and Elisabeth Morin-Chartier. Nationwide, his list was one of the three UMP lists that arrived ahead the Front National lists at these elections.

In the European Parliament, Joulaud was a member of the EPP group, the biggest political group in the European Parliament. He served as a full member of the Committee on Regional Development (REGI) and a substitute member of the Committee on Culture and Education (CULT).

On the REGI committee, Joulaud worked on urban policies and the implementation of the new regional policy. In the CULT committee, he specialised in digital policies, copyright policy and the audiovisual and media policies. Reflecting this, he was appointed as the EPP shadow rapporteur on CULT opinions on IPR enforcement and the copyright reform.

Joulaud was also a member of the EU-Mexico Joint Parliamentary Committee, of the Euro-Latin American Parliamentary Assembly. And he is a substitute member of the South-Caucasus Parliamentary Cooperation Committees and the Euronest Parliamentary Assembly

In the Republicans’ 2017 leadership election, Joulaud endorsed Laurent Wauquiez.
