= Fillon affair =

French political-financial scandal

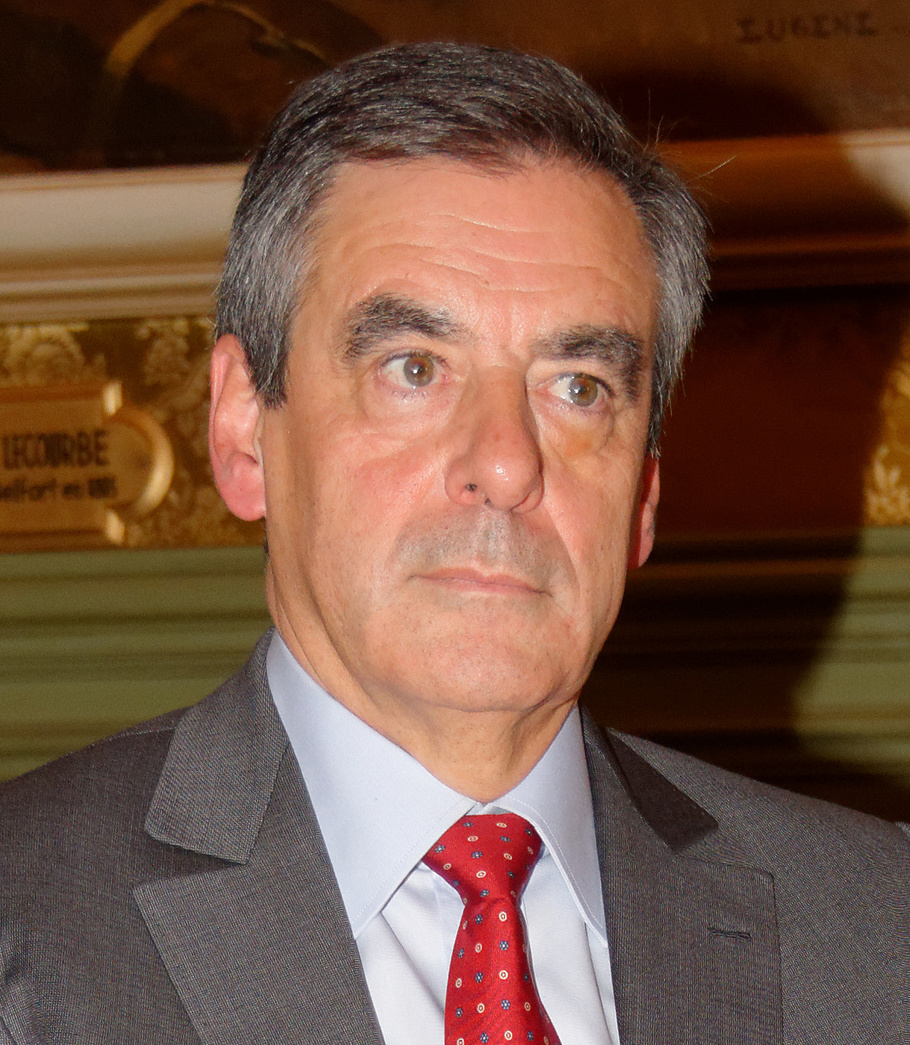
François Fillon in 2016

The Fillon affair (also the Penelope Fillon affair or Penelopegate) is a political-financial scandal involving immediate family members of French politician François Fillon being given high paid jobs that involved no or very little actual work. The case surfaced during the campaign for the 2017 French presidential election which Fillon, the candidate of the Republicans after winning the primary of the right and centre, was at the time strongly favoured to win.

The affair began when the 25 January 2017 edition of satirical weekly Le Canard enchaîné alleged that Penelope Fillon, wife of François Fillon, received €500,000 between 1998 and 2007 and in 2012 for a no-show job as a parliamentary assistant to first her husband and then his substitute Marc Joulaud. It also claimed that she was paid €100,000 as a literary adviser to the Revue des deux Mondes. The absence of evidence of work by Penelope Fillon and her distance from political life led the newspaper to suspect that these jobs were fictitious. The same day, the National Financial Prosecutor (Parquet national financier, or PNF) opened a preliminary investigation into embezzlement and misuse of public funds.

On 1 February, an article in the following issue of Le Canard enchaîné claimed that, including the years 1988 to 1990 and 2013, the total wages Penelope Fillon collected as a parliamentary assistant were in fact €813,440. In addition, the weekly revealed that two of the couple's children, Charles and Marie Fillon, received €84,000 while employed from 2005 to 2007 as assistants to their father, then a Senator.

On 17 February, François Fillon reneged on his previous promise that he would drop his bid if he was placed under formal investigation and announced he would maintain his candidacy regardless. On 14 March, he was placed under formal investigation for misuse of public funds, embezzlement, and failure to comply with transparency requirements. On 16 March the investigation was extended to "aggravated fraud, forgery, falsification of records" and influence-peddling, as investigators raised concerns that seized documents were forged in order to provide evidence of tangible work by Penelope Fillon.

After several years of investigations and a trial lasting almost six months, he was convicted on 20 June 2020. On 29 June 2020, Penelope was also convicted. François was sentenced to five years, while Penelope received a sentence of three years. They both appealed their sentences. The sentences were reduced to four years for François and two years for Penelope by a French appeals court on 9 May 2022.

== Initial claims in Le Canard enchaîné (25–31 January 2017) ==
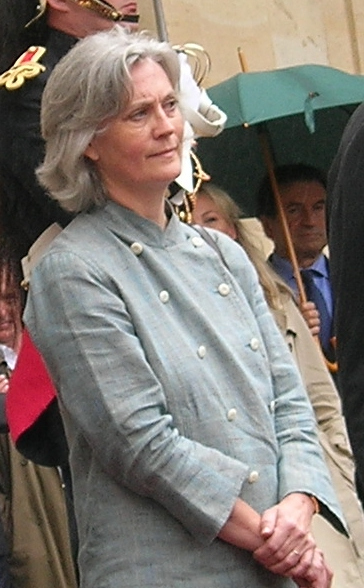
Penelope Fillon in 2007

On 25 January 2017, the satirical weekly Le Canard enchaîné published an article alleging that Penelope Fillon, wife of François Fillon, was employed as a parliamentary assistant by her husband from 1998 and 2002 and for six months in 2012 with no evidence that she completed any substantial work, while collecting a monthly salary of €3,900 to €4,600. After her husband's appointment as Minister of Social Affairs in 2002 and later tenure as Minister of National Education, she served as a parliamentary aide to Marc Joulaud, Fillon's substitute, until 2007, earning a salary upwards of €7,900 during this period. In all, the article claimed that she received €500,000 as a parliamentary aide, in addition to €100,000 as a literary adviser to the Revue des deux Mondes, whose owner, businessman Marc Ladreit de Lacharrière, is a close friend of François Fillon. While deputies in the National Assembly are permitted to employ family members, those are still required to complete legitimate work. Le Canard cited Jeanne Robinson-Behre, an ex-parliamentary assistant to Joulaud who would have been expected to work with Penelope Fillon, as saying "I've never worked with her. [...] I knew her only as a minister's wife." Similarly, Christine Kelly, who penned a biography of François Fillon, asserted that she had "never heard that [Penelope] Fillon worked". The National Financial Prosecutor (PNF) initiated a preliminary investigation into possible embezzlement and misuse of public funds the same day.

On 26 January, François Fillon appeared on TF1 to respond to allegations of the fictitious employment of his wife, stating that she had "edited my speeches" and "stood in for me at events when I couldn’t be there", also claiming that the reason that she was never seen working in the Palais Bourbon was because "she was never on the front line." In the interview, he also disclosed that he paid two of his children while a Senator for the Sarthe between 2005 and 2007, claiming that he did so for work in their capacity as lawyers. He also pledged to resign if he was personally placed under investigation. However, on 27 January, it was revealed that both Marie and Charles Fillon were only law students when they were employed by their father during his stint in the Senate, contrary to his earlier statements. Police officers acting on behalf of the OCLCIFF, responsible for the preliminary investigation into the affair, interrogated Fillon biographer Christine Kelly and former editor-in-chief of the Revue des deux Mondes Michel Crépu the same day, seeking to establish what work that Penelope Fillon had completed for the journal. Only "two or maybe three" bylines were attributed to her, Crépu said, also saying that he had seen "no trace" of any work by her that would "resemble [that of] a literary adviser". The HATVP authorized a raid of the offices of the review on 28 January as part of the preliminary investigation.

A report in the Journal du Dimanche on 29 January alleged that Fillon drew seven checks totaling €21,000 in public funds using a known legal mechanism while Senator for the Sarthe. In an interview with the paper published in the same issue, he stated that he was a victim of slander, denouncing the accusations leveled at him as a "gross manipulation". Fillon and his spouse were questioned for five hours by police of the OCLCIFF the following day, reportedly in order to assist authorities in their determination of the nature of Penelope Fillon's work. Marc Ladreit de Lacharrière, president of Revue des deux Mondes, was also separately interrogated in connection with the investigation of fictitious employment. This was succeeded by a subsequent search on the floor of the National Assembly on 31 January, seeking employment contracts for Penelope Fillon, who claimed that she no longer had them; it was later reported that she claimed that she did not remember if she even signed such contracts during questioning by investigators. Le Parisien revealed in a piece published the same day that she had neither a parliament badge nor an email address during the period she supposedly served as a parliamentary assistant. Though Antonin Lévy, Fillon's lawyer, maintained that many aides did not have a badge and most lacked an email address, most working in the Palais Bourbon have a badge, and to lack one was extremely uncommon in practice.

== Additional sums revealed (1–8 February) ==
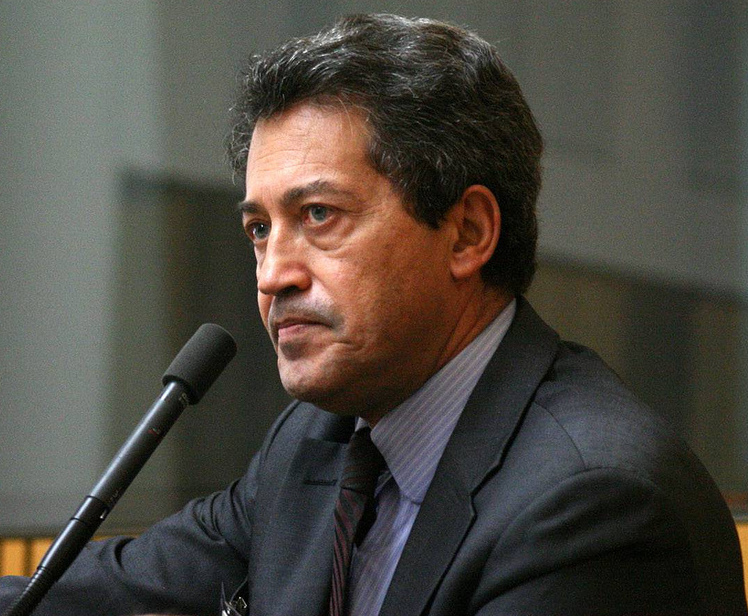
Georges Fenech, Sarkozyite and LR deputy who repeatedly expressed concerns about Fillon's candidacy

On 1 February, a week after its initial report, Le Canard enchaîné published revelations that the total sum received by Penelope Fillon in fictitious jobs apparently totaled more than €930,000; with the addition of the period from 1988 to 1990 and 2013, her income as a parliamentary assistant now totaled €831,440. In addition, the satirical weekly also revealed that the payments to two of Fillon's children reached nearly €84,000, with €57,084 net for Marie Fillon and €26,651 for Charles Fillon. In a closed-door meeting at his campaign headquarters with Republican parliamentarians the same day, he denounced "an institutional coup d'état" of "the left" and requested that they "hold on for 15 days" to let the inquiry run its course. In addition, Marc Joulaud, substitute of Fillon in the National Assembly who succeeded him as deputy, testified before investigators in the afternoon to describe the character of Penelope Fillon's work. Increasingly anxious LR deputies, headed by former judge Georges Fenech, expressed concerns about the continued candidacy of Fillon, with some speculating that he could be replaced on the ticket by Alain Juppé, who came second in the primary of the right. L'Obs managed to procure the missing employment contracts of Penelope Fillon, revealing that she was supposedly based at the Le Mans offices of Fillon's RPR party. However, local party activists contacted by the publication indicated that, even there, they had never seen her work. The document, however, contained two addresses: a full address in Le Mans and the town of Sablé-sur-Sarthe, but without any address within the town; in response to the story, Lévy claimed this the discrepancy occurred because "somebody added an address", affirming that Sablé-sur-Sarthe was the actual location of her employment.

Video excerpts of a May 2007 Sunday Telegraph interview with Penelope Fillon surfaced on 2 February in which she claimed that she had "never been his assistant," referring to her husband. The footage aired on Envoyé spécial on France 2 that evening, and was received by a record audience of 5.4 million viewers. The PNF expanded investigation into the fictitious employment affair to include Fillon's two eldest children the same day to verify the veracity of their work, after Le Canard reported that neither Marie nor Charles Fillon were lawyers at the time their father served in the Senate. The following morning, officers acting for the PNF and authorized by Gérard Larcher retrieved documents relating to their positions and terms of the pair's employment from the Senate. In a video posted on social networks in the afternoon, François Fillon insisted that he would maintain his candidacy and called on his supporters to "hold the line", seeking to assuage worries from within his own camp about the maintenance of his candidacy.

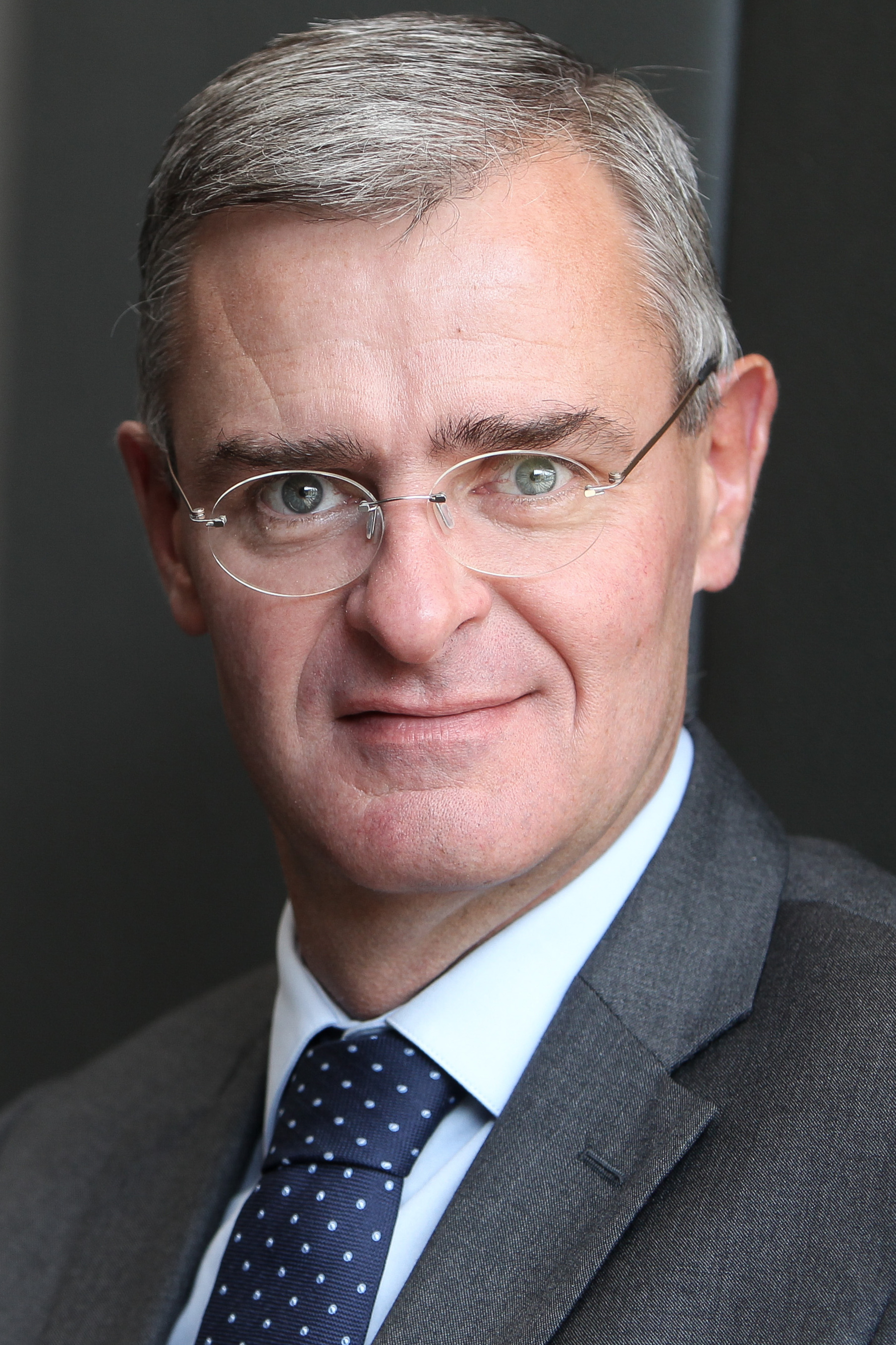
Marc Joulaud, substitute and successor to François Fillon, employed Penelope Fillon from 2002 to 2007

On 6 February, Fillon held a press conference at his campaign headquarters at which he "apologized to the French people" and acknowledged that he had committed an "error" in employing family members as parliamentary assistants, but appended that he "never broke the law". He also confirmed that his wife was employed as a parliamentary assistant for 15 years with an average monthly salary of €3,677, and argued that "her salary was perfectly justified because her activities were indispensable to my activities as an elected official", adding that everything reported by the press on the issue was "legal and transparent". He said he would not reimburse the payments received by his wife or children, and, saying that he had "nothing to hide", divulged his property holdings. Furthermore, he also contended that British journalist Kim Willsher, who interviewed his wife for the Sunday Telegraph, was "shocked" by the usage of the excerpt on France 2; soon after Fillon's statement, Willsher denied that the interview was taken out of context. In addition to promising that his lawyers would question the competency of the PNF to carry out the investigation, he lambasted a "media lynching" of his campaign. Noting that there was no "plan B" for the Republicans (LR), and having received millions of votes in the primary of the right, he vowed to maintain his bid for the presidency. His remarks followed Juppé's declaration that "NO means NO" earlier in the day in response to rumors that he might replace Fillon as the party's candidate should he decide to drop his bid.

Le Canard continued its run of stories on Fillon in its issue of 8 February, revealing that Penelope Fillon collected severance payments totaling €45,000, with €16,000 in August 2002 for the period 1998–2002 and €29,000 in 2013 for seventeen months of employment for which she earned €65,839. The satirical weekly also asserted that she received a double salary during the summer of 2002, as she was hired by Joulaud's office on 13 July, more than a month before her contract as a parliamentary assistant with her husband expired, on 21 August. Although aides are eligible to collect severance payments, the law does not permit such a high level for parliamentary assistants. An article in the same issue reported that Marie Fillon was simultaneously employed as a parliamentary assistant while training to become a lawyer, taking the first post in October 2005 and entering the EFB in January 2006. Fillon responded to the claims in a press release by saying that Le Canard conflated the amount his wife collected in November 2013 with reported earnings in August 2007 after the conclusion of her work with Joulaud, and denounced the paper's allegations as "lies", to which editor-in-chief Louis-Marie Horeau replied that "severance payments [with public funds] were dispensed while another hiring was already scheduled... as for the date, even if there was an imprecision, what would that change?" Fillon penned a letter appealing to voters printed the same day in Ouest-France, in which he said he "decided not to give in to intimidation and pressure," reaffirmed that his actions were legal, and again apologized for his employment of relatives.

== Moving towards an investigation (9–28 February) ==
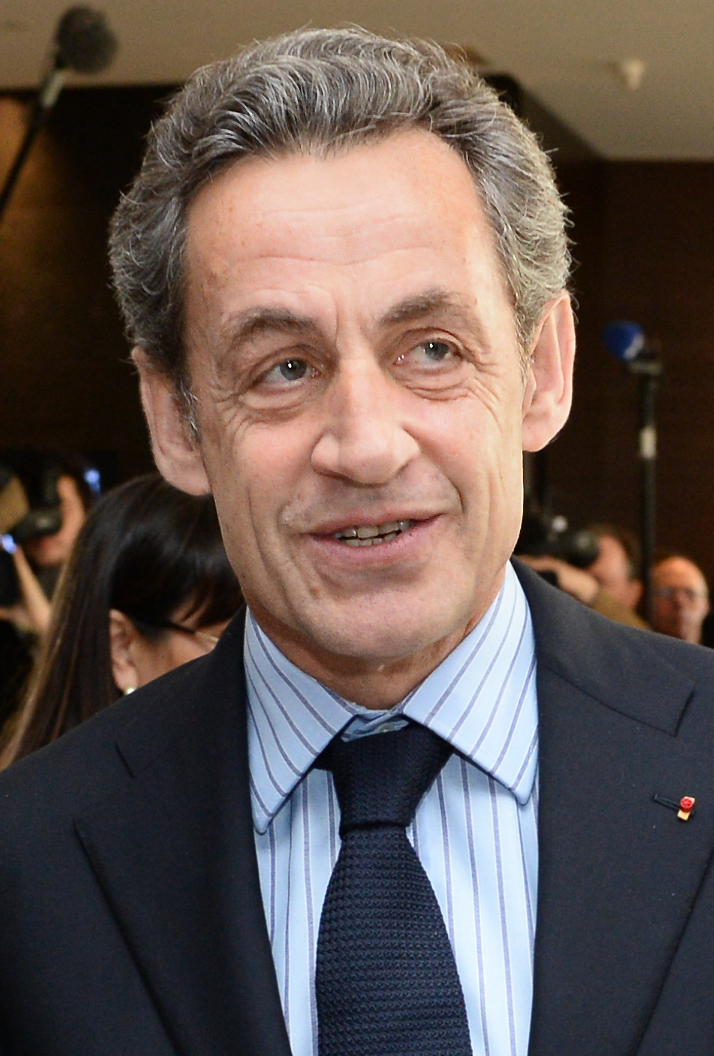
Sarkozy in 2015

On 9 February, Fillon's lawyers demanded that the PNF drop the investigation into their candidate. Lévy reaffirmed that he believed the office was not competent to pursue the investigation because the actions of his client did not fall under its jurisdiction and questioned its neutrality, alleging that there had been "breaches of confidentiality", in addition to a "serious breach of the principle of the separation of powers". On the evening of 13 February, seventeen dissidents of the Republicans met over dinner, including Georges Fenech, MEP Nadine Morano, and Claude Goasguen to discuss the state of the Fillon campaign with the aim of arriving on a common position before a planned meeting with the party's candidate the following day at which they intended to urge him to "take responsibility". Fenech and the other dissidents, however, backed down the following day on their demand in an open letter to convene the political bureau of the Republicans. Seeking to calm the waters and recover his base, Fillon requested a lunch with Nicolas Sarkozy – whose many allies were among those rebelling against the candidate – on 15 February. Sarkozy reportedly demanded that one of his allies, François Baroin, be given a prominent position in the Fillon campaign; the former finance minister was often floated as a potential replacement for Fillon in the event that the latter decided to quit or was forced out.

On 16 February, the PNF issued a statement explaining that the OCLCIFF would be continuing its investigation into the potential embezzlement and misuse of public funds involving François and Penelope Fillon; the same day, Fillon seemingly withdrew his earlier promise that he would terminate his candidacy if placed under formal investigation, saying "even if I am put under investigation, nothing will stop me" in private. In an interview with Le Figaro published on 17 February, he insisted on continuing his campaign, declaring "I am the candidate and I will continue until victory" and that the closer to the election it was, the "more scandalous it would be to deprive the right and centre of a candidate." Hoping to sway public opinion in their candidate's favor, the campaign team of Fillon also planned to immediately present all the necessary signatures of elected officials at the opening of the sponsorship collection period.

A month after opening a preliminary investigation into the affair, on 24 February the PNF finally opened a judicial investigation into the "embezzlement of public funds, [...] influence-peddling and failure to comply with transparency obligations of the HATVP" against François Fillon, his wife, two of his children, and Marc Joulaud (who were left unnamed, presumably, to allow for expanding the investigation to other suspects, if necessary). The PNF acted in order to preempt the promulgation of Article 4 of the law adopted on 16 February 2017 modifying the statute of limitations for numerous criminal offenses such that acts committed more than 12 years before could not be prosecuted; in the Fillon case, this would refer to the period prior to 2005, and by deciding to open a case, the PNF ensured that its investigation could continue. The OCLCIFF, which failed to unearth any tangible proof of work by Fillon's wife as a parliamentary assistant to her husband from 1988 to 1990, 1998 to 2000, and 2012 to 2013 or to Marc Joulaud from 2002 to 2007, and was unconvinced by the two reviews in the Revue des deux Mondes attributed to Penelope Fillon, tasked three investigative judges to continue pursuing the affair. These three judges were identified on 27 February by Mediapart as Serge Tournaire – known for overseeing the Bygmalion affair case involving claims of illegal campaign financing by Sarkozy in the 2012 presidential election – Stéphanie Tacheau, and Aude Buresi.

== Opening of a formal investigation (1–4 March) ==
On 1 March, Fillon abruptly cancelled a campaign visit to the Paris International Agricultural Show (Salon de l'agriculture) without offering an explanation, taking even his own campaign officials by surprise. He was informed that he was summoned to appear before the judges and likely to be placed under formal investigation – generally a precursor to an eventual indictment – on 15 March, and subsequently held a press conference at which he insisted on remaining in the race, saying "I will not give in, will not surrender, I will not withdraw, I will fight to the end," and decried what he called an act of "political assassination." In the hours and days following the statement, dozens of campaign members, allies, and supporters rescinded their support for Fillon. Bruno Le Maire, former primary candidate and European and international affairs adviser to the campaign, resigned that afternoon, and the Union of Democrats and Independents (UDI), a centre-right party whose president Jean-Christophe Lagarde backed Juppé in the primary, suspended its participation in the campaign. The cascade of defections followed in subsequent days, with fifteen staffers at campaign headquarters quitting on 2 March, including spokesman Benoist Apparu, treasurer Gilles Boyer, and deputy campaign director Sébastien Lecornu. Fillon's house in Paris was searched that morning on the orders of the three investigative judges, with OCLCIFF officers seizing several documents from the residence by mid-afternoon. Meanwhile, associates of Juppé indicated that he was apparently warming to the idea of stepping in to run if needed, "ready but loyal".

Members of Fillon's campaign, as well as supporters, continued to abandon the embattled candidate on 3 March; notable departures included that of spokesmen Thierry Solère and Benoist Apparu. Many of those rescinding their support speculated about the potential return of Juppé to replace Fillon as the party's candidate, with Fenech urging elected officials file sponsorships for the ex-primary candidate. Campaign director Patrick Stefanini jumped ship that morning, submitting his letter of resignation Fillon, who accepted it; in it, Stefanini wrote that he was "no longer in the best position to lead your campaign" and that victory was no longer certain, lamenting that "little or nothing" of his work was left. In addition, the UDI formally withdrew their support for and requested the replacement of Fillon as the candidate of the Republicans. President of the Senate Gérard Larcher and secretary general of the Republicans Bernard Accoyer met Nicolas Sarkozy to "organize very quickly", with the ex-president warning that "this cannot last" but stopping short of demanding that his former PM desist. OCLCIFF investigators searched the Fillon residence near Sablé-sur-Sarthe in the midst of the judicial inquiry the same day, just a day after a search at their residence in Paris.

On 4 March, Penelope Fillon spoke out for the first time since the publication of the revelations, giving an interview with the Journal du Dimanche in which she described her work as a parliamentary assistant to her husband and Joulaud, and as literary adviser to Revue des deux Mondes; in the prior case, saying "I would prepare notes and memos for my husband [...] I also made some sort of local news roundup for him. I represented him at some events. I proofread his speeches." Explaining her work for the review, she said she produced ten notes, of which only two were published; presuming the silence as hostility, she resigned. She also said that she did not know Michel Crépu, and maintained that though her children were also employed by her husband, everything had been legal and declared. Asked if she had "confidence in the justice system", she replied affirmatively.

== Defections and expansion of case (5 March–April 2017) ==
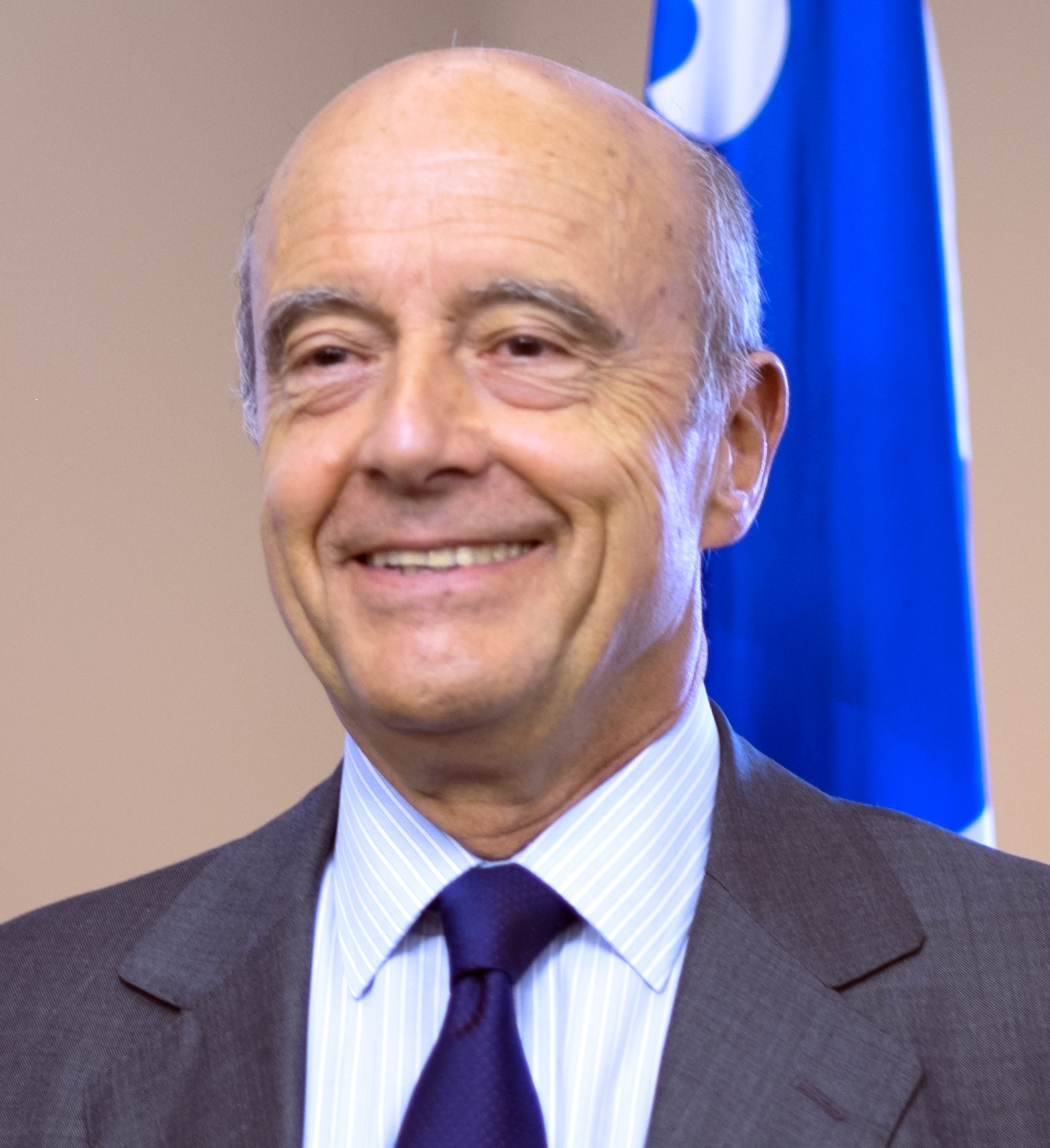
Alain Juppé officially announced on 6 March that he would not replace Fillon as the party's candidate

A total of 306 elected officials and members of the Fillon campaign withdrew their support for the candidate by 5 March. Despite this chain of defections, François Fillon remained defiant, planning a rally at the Trocadéro on that afternoon. Many elected officials deplored Fillon's denouncements of the judicial system, including politicians on the right such as President of the Regional Council of Provence-Alpes-Côte d'Azur Christian Estrosi, who urged him to exit the race. In a half-hour speech to a crowd of supporters, he said that, attacked from all sides as a victim of a manhunt, he examined his conscience and admitted he had made a mistake in employing his wife and a second mistake in his hesitation to address the issue. However, he did not remark on the continuation of his candidacy. He then appeared on 20 heures on France 2 that evening, during which he refused to give up his candidacy, saying that "there is no alternative" and adding that "no one today can stop me from being a candidate", insisting that "it is not the party that will decide" the fate of his candidacy. He said that the rally at the Trocadéro cemented his legitimacy, and that though he would have stepped down two months ago if indicted then, it was now too close to the presidential election and it would be unfair to voters of the right if he quit now. With a "political committee" planned for the following day, he proposed to assemble a modified campaign team, naming François Baroin, Éric Ciotti, and Luc Chatel, in an attempt to rally support around his candidacy. Immediately after Fillon's appearance, Juppé announced on Twitter that he give a statement to the press in Bordeaux at 10:30 CET the day after.

Sources close to Juppé reportedly told L'Obs that he shared his decision not to run with relatives during the late afternoon of 5 March, and he officially announced his abstention from the race on 6 March, saying that "for me, it is too late". He added that Fillon was at a "dead end" with his allegations of political assassination, and lamenting "What a mess!" He also criticized the right turn of the party under Fillon, saying that the party's militants had become "radicalized". The same day, the party's "political committee" rallied behind Fillon, unanimously reaffirming its support for his candidacy, and a three-way meeting between Fillon, Juppé and Sarkozy was planned for the following day, but it was cancelled on 7 March because Juppé was no longer interested in remaining involved in the campaign. The same day, Le Canard enchaîné revealed that Fillon had failed to declare to the HATVP a €50,000 loan from Marc Ladreit de Lacharrière, the president of Revue des deux Mondes who was questioned by police about the terms of his employment of Penelope Fillon. The UDI renewed its support for Fillon that evening, albeit only conditionally.

Seeking to stabilize his campaign, Fillon appointed a group of Sarkozy allies to his team on 9 March: Christian Jacob and Bruno Retailleau as "campaign coordinators", François Baroin responsible for political unity, and Luc Chatel as spokesman. On 13 March, Le Parisien revealed that investigators discovered suspicious wire transfers made by Marie and Charles Fillon to their father while employed by him, with Marie returning €33,000 of the €46,000 she was paid (having told investigators as much on 9 February). She explained that these transfers represented a reimbursement for the cost of her marriage on 26 August 2006, but investigators suspected that the payments could have been used to support her father's lifestyle. She also provided fourteen bills, her diary, a badge from the Senate, and evidence of research to investigators tasked with the fictitious employment case. Charles Fillon, in his hearing at the OCLCIFF, referred to similar transfers to his parents' joint account, worth about 30% of his salary.

On the morning of 14 March, Fillon was placed under formal investigation for misuse of public funds, embezzlement, and failure to comply with HATVP disclosure requirements. On 16 March the investigation into Fillon, delegated to three investigative judges, was extended to "aggravated fraud, forgery, and falsification of records". In particular, the probe seeks to determine whether documents seized during a search of the National Assembly in March were forged in order to corroborate the veracity of Penelope Fillon's work as a parliamentary assistant. The investigation was also expanded into possible influence-peddling related to Fillon's consulting firm 2F Conseil, which was previously hired by billionaire Marc Ladreit de Lacharrière, owner of the Revue des deux Mondes, which employed Penelope Fillon. In 2013 de Lacharrière also provided a €50,000 loan to François Fillon, who failed to declare it as legally required. On 24 March, Marc Joulaud, Fillon's former substitute, was formally placed under investigation for embezzlement of public funds. Penelope Fillon was placed under formal investigation for complicity in and concealment of embezzlement and misuse of public funds, as well as aggravated fraud, on 28 March.

On 10 April, Mediapart revealed that Penelope Fillon had in fact been paid by the National Assembly starting in 1982, not 1986 as earlier claimed by François Fillon. The edition of Le Canard enchaîné set for publication on 12 April later revealed that François Fillon secured his then-fiancée a job three times the minimum wage in a Parisian ministry as early as 1980, while he was serving as deputy chief of staff to Minister of Defence Joël Le Theule; her contract only ended when Fillon's party lost power to the Socialists, after 15 months.

== Trial and conviction ==
The trial on corruption charges began in February 2020. and lasted until late June. Fillon was convicted and sentenced to five years, of which three were suspended. His wife Penelope would also be convicted and given a three year suspended sentence. On 9 May 2022, a French appeals court reduced Fillon's prison sentence shortened to four years with three years suspended. Penelope would be given a suspended two-year prison sentence for the embezzlement charge. The court maintained fines of €375,000 for each of them. His lawyer, François-Henri Briard spoke about the lack of impartiality of the criminal proceedings brought against him in 2017, which would be ‘without doubt unprecedented in French judicial history’.

== See also ==
- 2017 French presidential election
- Le Canard enchaîné
- List of political scandals in France
