= Cabrol =

Cabrol is a French surname of Occitan origin. It is believed to be derived from the Latin word capreolus, meaning deer. Notable people with this surname include:

- Agnès Cabrol (1964–2007), French Egyptologist
- Ariadna Cabrol (b. 1982), Spanish actress
- Darío Cabrol (b. 1972), Argentinian footballer
- Fernand Cabrol (1855–1937), French theologian
- Nathalie Cabrol (b. 1963), French American astrobiologist
- Raoul Cabrol (1895–1956), French caricaturist
