= Didier Hassoux =

French investigative journalist and political writer

Didier Hassoux is a French investigative journalist and political writer. He is the co-author of six books about French politics, and he writes for the satirical newspaper Le Canard enchaîné.

During the 2017 French presidential election, center-right candidate François Fillon said Hassoux's sixth book, Bienvenue Place Beauvau, suggested President François Hollande ran a shadow cabinet to spread rumours about his opponents. Hassoux denied this was the case.

== Works ==
- Davidenkoff, Emmanuel; Hassoux, Didier (2004). Luc Ferry, une comédie du pouvoir. Paris: Hachette Littératures. ISBN 9782012357785. OCLC 265563691.
- Amar, Cécile; Hassoux, Didier (2005). Ségolène et François. Paris: Éditions Privé. ISBN 9782350760025.
- Dély, Renaud; Hassoux, Didier (2008). Sarkozy et l'argent roi. Paris: Calmann-Lévy. ISBN 9782702139349. OCLC 470985602.
- Hassoux, Didier; Labbé, Christophe; Recasens, Olivia (2011). L'Espion du président : Au cœur de la police politique de Sarkozy. Paris: Éditions Robert Laffont. ISBN 9782221129838.
- Hassoux, Didier; Thénard, Jean-Michel (2012). Comment j'ai sauvé le Président : Farces et attrapes de la Sarkozie. Paris: Calmann-Lévy. ISBN 9782702142875. OCLC 780367759.
- Hassoux, Didier; Labbé, Christophe; Recasens, Olivia (2017). Bienvenue Place Beauvau - Police : Les Secrets inavouables d'un quinquennat. Paris: Éditions Robert Laffont. ISBN 9782221198988.
