= Jean Galtier-Boissière =

French writer, polemist and journalist (1891-1966)

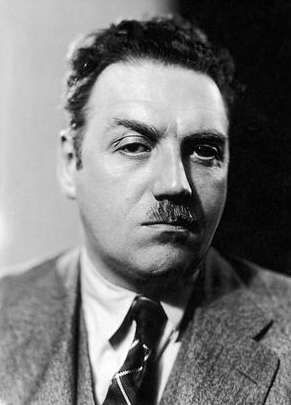
Jean Galtier Boissière

Jean Galtier-Boissière (26 December 1891, Paris – 22 January 1966, Neuilly-sur-Seine) was a writer, polemist, and journalist from Paris, France. He founded Le Crapouillot and wrote for Le Canard enchaîné.

== Bibliography ==
- Croquis De Tranchées. 1917
- Loin De La Rifflette. Baudinière, 1921
- La fleur au fusil. Baudinière, 1929
- Mon journal pendant l'occupation. Garas, La Jeune parque, 1944
- La belle amour. Illustrations de Jean Oberlé, Gründ, 1945
- Tradition de la trahison chez les maréchaux, suivie d'une vie de Philippe-Omer Pétain. Trémois, 1945
- Trois héros. La Jeune parque, 1947
- Mon journal dans la drôle de paix. La Jeune parque, 1947
- Mon journal dans la grande pagaïe. La Jeune parque, 1950
- Mémoires d'un parisien. La Table Ronde, 1961
