= Lefred Thouron =

French cartoonist and writer

Lefred Thouron is a French cartoonist and writer.

== Early life ==
He was born in Nancy, France in 1961.

== Career ==
His first cartoons were published in 1984 in Hara-Kiri and weekly news magazine L'événement du Jeudi, the daily Libération, 7 à Paris, La Grosse Bertha and Charlie Hebdo (which he left in 1996 following the Patrick Font controversy). He authored 20 or so books. Lefred works for the French irreverent political press, Le Canard Enchaîné, where he is one of the chief contributors with Pétillon and Cabu. He contributes a weekly column for l'Équipe magazine that covers sports news. For Fluide Glacial he contributes humorous illustrations, cartoons, articles and photo-stories.

As a writer, Thouron collaborated with Yan Lindingre on Les carottes sont crues, a spoof on the "organic" craze. He brought back to life The Adventures of Super-Dupont with Gotlib and Solé in the magazine Fluide Glacial. He worked with Diego Aranega to produce Casiers Judiciaires , slices of life in a provincial courthouse, recently published as a collection by Dargaud.

== Bibliography ==
=== Press ===
Le Canard Enchaîné, L’Équipe Magazine, Fluide Glacial, La Décroissance, CQFD, Libération, etc.

=== Books and collections ===
==== Dargaud ====
- Casiers Judiciaires (artwork by Diego Aranega)

==== Glénat ====
- Œuvres complètes, tome 8 (houit)
- Manger est bon
- Nos animaux les bêtes
- Étons modernes

==== Fluide Glacial ====
- Soyons sports dans l’effort
- Le sport bourse pleine
- Je suis gland
- Ich bin vraiiiment gland
- Superdupont

==== Hors Collection ====
- Ana-Gangné

==== Canal+ éditions ====
- 600 blagues de Sport (with Eric Bayle)

==== Bikini ====
- Les 5000 meilleurs dessins de Lefred Thouron
- Gros Congé
- Toi & Moi
- Poulet pur porc

==== Les Requins Marteaux ====
- Les carottes sont crues (artwork by Lindingre)

==== Verticales ====
- Aimémé Jacquet, droit au but par la diagonale

==== Albin Michel ====
- Bernadette, priez pour nous

==== Editions du Layeur ====
- Et puis c’est comme ça
