= Maurice Pefferkorn =

French sports journalist (1884–1953)

Maurice Pefferkorn (Moreuil, 23 July 1884 – Paris, 8 August 1953) was a French sports journalist and writer. He specialized in association football.

He was an engineer by training, graduating from the Industrial Institute of the North (current Lille Central School), class of 1907. He was notably a sports columnist for the right-wing nationalist newspaper Candide. He wrote several books on football, the Olympic Games, and athletic sport. He is the winner of the Grand Prize for Sports Literature.
