= Sarthe's 4th constituency =

Constituency of the National Assembly of France

4th constituency of the Sarthe
- inline Constituency of the National Assembly of France

- The constituency in Sarthe
- Deputy: Elise Leboucher; LFI
- Department: Sarthe
- Cantons: Allonnes, Brûlon, Loué, Malicorne-sur-Sarthe, Le Mans Ouest, Sablé-sur-Sarthe, La Suze-sur-Sarthe

The 4th constituency of the Sarthe is a French legislative constituency in the Sarthe département.

The constituency was won in every legislative election between 1981 and 2007 by François Fillon, who resigned his seat upon his appointment as Prime Minister in 2007, as a member of the executive cannot simultaneously be a member of the legislature.

== Historic representation ==
Election	Member	Party
1988	François Fillon	RPR
1993	François Fillon	RPR
1993	Pierre Lefebvre	RPR
1997	François Fillon	RPR
2002	François Fillon	UMP
2002	Marc Joulaud	UMP
2007	François Fillon	UMP
2007	Marc Joulaud	UMP
2012	Stéphane Le Foll	PS
2012	Sylvie Tolmont	PS
2017	Stéphane Le Foll	PS
2018	Sylvie Tolmont	PS
2022	Élise Leboucher	LFI
2024	Élise Leboucher	LFI

== Election results ==
=== 2024 ===
Candidate	Party	Alliance	First round		Second round	
Candidate	Party	Alliance	Votes	%	Votes	%
Élise Leboucher	NFP	Ensemble	13,600	25.94	24,136	50.23
Marie-Caroline Le Pen	RN		20,584	39.26	23,911	49.77
Sylvie Casenave-Péré	REN	Ensemble	13,565	25.88		
Léo Brisard	LR		2,316	4.42		
Didier Barbet	Ind	DVD	1,546	2.95		
Thierry Nouchy	LO		596	1.14		
Jean-Michel Brugade	Ind	Reg	217	0.41		
Valid votes			52,424	96.83	48,047	89.13
Blank votes			1,250	2.31	4,705	8.73
Null votes			469	0.87	1,155	2.14
Turnout			54,143	66.48	53,907	66.18
Abstentions			27,296	33,52	27,554	33.82
Registered voters			81,439		81,461	
Result			LFI HOLD			

=== 2022 ===
Legislative Election 2022: Sarthe's 4th constituency
Party	Candidate	Votes	%	±%
LFI (NUPÉS)	Elise Leboucher	7,878	21.87	-27.70
RN	Raymond De Malherbe	7,673	21.30	+8.34
DVC (Ensemble)	Joachim Le Floch-Imad	6,876	19.09	N/A
PS	Sylvie Tolmont*	5,574	15.47	N/A
LR (UDC)	Emmanuel Franco	4,261	11.83	−10.32
DIV	Didier Barbet	1,232	3.42	N/A
REC	Sébastien Buard	1,196	3.32	N/A
Others	N/A	1,331	3.70	
Turnout		36,021	45.71	+0.33
2nd round result
LFI (NUPÉS)	Elise Leboucher	14,891	50.15	-4.76
RN	Raymond De Malherbe	14,804	49.85	N/A
Turnout		29,695	44.42	+7.56
LFI gain from PS				

* PS dissident without the support of the NUPES alliance

=== 2017 ===
Legislative Election 2017: Sarthe's 4th constituency
Party	Candidate	Votes	%	±%
PS	Stéphane Le Foll	10,954	30.31	
LR	Emmanuel Franco	8,005	22.15	
FN	Catherine Trahtenbroit	4,682	12.96	
LFI	Pascale Fromentiere	4,127	11.42	
EELV	Aleis Braud	1,844	5.10	
DVD	Emmanuel D'Aillieres	1,820	5.04	
DIV	Bidier Barbet	1,506	4.17	
PCF	Youssef Ben Amar	989	2.74	
Others	N/A	2,210		
Turnout		36,137	45.38	
2nd round result
PS	Stéphane Le Foll	16,117	54.91	
LR	Emmanuel Franco	13,245	45.09	
Turnout		29,352	36.86	
PS hold				

=== 2012 ===
Legislative Election 2012: Sarthe's 4th constituency
Party	Candidate	Votes	%	±%
PS	Stéphane Le Foll	21,415	46.01	
UMP	Marc Joulaud	14,741	31.67	
FN	Henri Delaune	5,478	11.77	
FG	Chantal Hersemeule	2,100	4.51	
EELV	Isabelle Severe	1,314	2.82	
Others	N/A	1,500		
Turnout		46,548	58.99	
2nd round result
PS	Stéphane Le Foll	26,019	59.45	
UMP	Marc Joulaud	17,749	40.55	
Turnout		43,768	55.47	
PS gain from UMP				

=== 2007 ===
Legislative Election 2007: Sarthe 4th
Party	Candidate	Votes	%	±%
UMP	François Fillon	25,949	53.40	
PS	Stéphane Le Foll	14,592	30.03	
MoDem	Jean-Pierre Bourrely	1,992	4.10	
PCF	Gilles Leproust	1,989	4.09	
FN	Catherine du Boisbaudry	1,163	2.39	
LV	Dominique Niederkorn	1,044	2.15	
LO	Thierry Nouchy	506	1.04	
GE	Christophe Lemaître	449	0.92	
CPNT	Joël Esnault	374	0.77	
DVD	Maria Loire	259	0.53	
MNR	Jeannette Delory	146	0.30	
Independent	Christian Papin	132	0.27	
Turnout		49,560	63.53	
UMP hold		Swing		

== Sources & references ==
- Official results of French elections from 1998: "Résultats électoraux officiels en France" (in French).
