= Le Canard enchaîné =

French satirical and investigative weekly newspaper

- Type: Weekly newspaper
- Format: Newspaper
- Owner: Michel Gaillard
- Editor: S.A. Les Éditions Maréchal
- Founded: 1915; 111 years ago
- Political alignment: Independent
- Headquarters: Paris, France
- Circulation: 340,000 weekly (2018)
- ISSN: 0008-5405
- Website: lecanardenchaine.fr

Le Canard enchaîné (French pronunciation: [lə kanaʁ ɑ̃ʃɛne]; English: "The Chained Duck" or "The Chained Paper" as canard in French slang means "newspaper" or "rag") is a satirical weekly French newspaper founded in 1915 and headquartered in Paris. It features investigative journalism and leaks from sources inside the French government, the French political and business worlds, and jokes and cartoons. Le Canard enchaîné does not accept any advertisements and is privately owned, mostly by its own employees.

== Presentation ==
=== Early history ===
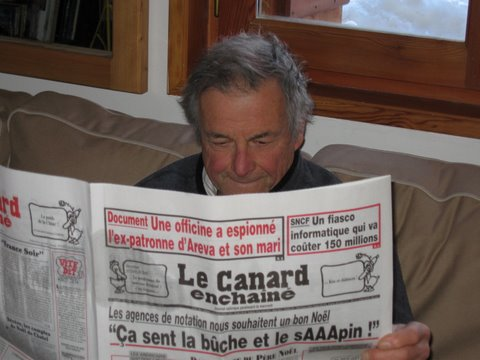
A reader consulting a copy of the newspaper Le Canard enchaîné.

The name is a reference to Radical Georges Clemenceau's newspaper L'homme libre ('The Free Man'), which was forced to close by government censorship and reacted upon its reopening by changing its name to L'homme enchaîné ("The Chained Man"); Le Canard enchaîné means 'The chained duck' but canard (duck) is also French slang for 'newspaper'; it was also a reference to French journals published by soldiers during World War I.

The weekly was founded in 1915 by Maurice Maréchal and his wife, Jeanne Maréchal, along with H. P. Gassier. It changed its title briefly after World War I to Le Canard Déchaîné ('The duck unbound' or 'out of control') to celebrate the end of military censorship of the press. It resumed the title Le Canard enchaîné in 1920.

The title also conveys a double meaning, 'canard' being a possible salacious rumour or whisper and 'enchaîné' simply meaning linked, hence 'the inside whisper'. It continued to publish and grow in popularity and influence until it was forced to suspend publication during the German occupation of France in 1940. After the liberation of France it resumed publication. It changed to its eight-page format in the 1960s.

Many of the Canard's early contributors were members of the Communist and Socialist parties, but it shed its alignment with those groups in the 1920s. Its current owners are not tied to any political or economic group. It now avoids any political alignment, and has gained a reputation for publishing incriminating stories and criticizing any political party with no preference. It is also fairly anti-clerical and lampoons the nobility. The Canard does not accept any advertisements.

In the 1920s it used to provide free advertising for Le Crapouillot, another satirical magazine created by Jean Galtier-Boissière, a friend of Maurice Maréchal. Similarly Le Crapouillot carried free advertisements for the Canard. Relations between the two magazines soured during the Spanish Civil War since Maréchal supported the Spanish Republican government of Madrid whilst Galtier-Boissière remained strictly pacifist. The Canard and its format served as an inspiration for the satirical weekly magazine El Be Negre, published in Barcelona between 1931 and 1936.

=== Typical format ===
The pages of the Canard are peppered with satirical cartoons. Here, René Pétillon mocks wealthy businesspeople who place both their production and their capital offshore. Reading: An amnesty in return for capital inflows? Return my capitals? And why not bring back my production sites as well, while you're at it?!

The Canard has a fixed eight-page layout. Pages 1, 2–4 and 8 are mostly news and editorials. Page 2 carries anecdotes from the political and business world. Pages 5–7 are dedicated to social issues (such as the environment), profiles, general humour and satire, and literary, theatre, opera and film criticism. One section, called l'Album de la Comtesse, is dedicated to spoonerisms.

The Canard is notable because of its focus on scandals in French governmental and business circles, although it does also cover other countries. Although they became more aggressive during François Mitterrand's presidency, major French newspapers are traditionally reluctant to challenge government corruption or pursue embarrassing scandals (the rationale being that revealing political or business scandals only profits extremists on the far-left or far-right); hence, the Canard fills that gap. The Canard publishes insider knowledge on politicians and leaks from administration officials, including information from whistle-blowers. Generally, the Canard is well informed about happenings within the world of French politics. Its revelations have sometimes brought about the resignation of cabinet ministers.

Some of the information published by the Canard clearly comes from very well-placed sources, who are likely to include ministerial aides. Charles de Gaulle was a frequent target, and was known to ask, "What does the bird have to say?" (Que dit le volatile?) every Wednesday – the day Canard would roll off the presses. There are often verbatim and off-the-record quotes from major politicians, including the president and prime minister, usually aimed at another politician.

The paper's international coverage has been pretty spotty, though it has improved. It relies mostly on leaks from French government services and reports from the other media.

It also publishes satirical cartoons and jokes. The factual and jocular columns are cleanly delineated.

=== Regular features ===
Every issue includes short political news (Mare au Canards); weekly profile (Prises de Bec); news from the media world; sections of press clippings (typos and malapropisms found in the French press) Rue des petites perles and À travers la presse déchaînée; the section which highlights the two most absurd or incomprehensible sentences of the week by politicians, respectively hanging them up on the mur du çon or awarding them the noix d'honneur; as well as its Sur l'Album de la Comtesse section of comic, cryptic spoonerisms. Some features are recurring but not present in every issue, such as bogus humorous interviews (interviews (presque) imaginaires) which have been copied by many others.

Across the years, it also included recurring features focusing on one or more personalities of the day. Notably during the 1960s, Roger Fressoz and the cartoonist Roland Moisan created a series, La Cour, which was a parody of Louis de Rouvroy, duc de Saint-Simon's Memoirs on the Reign of Louis XIV. Charles de Gaulle was turned into the king, and the deputies and the senators into courtiers. Thus, in La Cour, François Mitterrand became the ever-scheming count of Château-Chinon. In La Cour, the king would address his subjects by means of the étranges lucarnes (strange windows), a phrase de Gaulle had employed about television. After the death of de Gaulle, La Cour became La Régence with Georges Pompidou being the regent. This followed the Memoirs of Saint-Simon, which also extend into the Regency of Philippe II, Duke of Orléans that followed the death of Louis XIV. After the death of Georges Pompidou, La Régence was stopped.

Later long-running features include comical imaginary diaries such as the Journal de Xavière T. (following allegations of fake work done by Xavière Tiberi, wife of the then mayor of Paris); the Journal de Carla B. (describing Carla Bruni's bohemian-bourgeois reactions towards events involving her husband, then President Nicolas Sarkozy); the Journal de Penelope F. (in the run-up to the 2017 presidential election and following allegations of fake work by Penelope Fillon, wife of the Les Républicains candidate François Fillon).

The Canard also reports on topics affecting the general population: scandals in industries (workforce, safety issues), miscarriages of justice, misconduct in public administrations and services...

=== Argot ===
As with the British satirical magazine Private Eye, it has its own language, jargon and style. In particular, it has nicknames for politicians and personalities. Some examples include:

- Charles de Gaulle: Mongénéral, Badingaulle (after 13 May 1958, an allusion to Napoleon III)
- François Mitterrand: Tonton [Uncle] (the codename used by the French Secret Service in charge of his protection)
- Valéry Giscard d'Estaing: Valy, L'Ex (after 1981)
- Raymond Barre: Babarre
- Michel Debré: L'amer Michel [Bitter Michael] (from the popular rhyme La Mère Michel [Mother Michael])
- Michel Rocard: Hamster Jovial (an allusion to a comic by Marcel Gotlib in reference to his past as a scout)
- Robert Hersant: Le Papivore (a reference to the many papers that he bought)
- Christian Estrosi: Le Motodidacte (a reference to his past in motorbike racing)
- Jean-Pierre Raffarin: Le Phénix du Haut-Poitou (from his region of origin)
- Jacques Chirac: Chichi, Le Chi
- Bernadette Chirac: Bernie
- Nicolas Sarkozy: Sarkoléon (a portmanteau of Sarkozy with Napoleon), Le petit Nicolas (title of a popular series of children's books and also a reference to Sarkozy's short stature)
- François Hollande: Monsieur Royal (a reference to his one-time life-partner Ségolène Royal), the pedalo captain
- Jean-Pierre Chevènement: Le Che

== Staff ==
As of 2004, the publisher of the Canard was Michel Gaillard, and the head editors were Claude Angeli and Erik Emptaz. The Canard's cartoonists include:

- André Escaro
- Jacques-Armand Cardon
- Lefred Thouron
- Delambre
- Kerleroux
- Carlos Brito
- Wozniak
- Guiraud
- Ghertman
- Pancho
- Patrick Chappatte

Past cartoonists included:

- Cabu, whose Beauf character was featured in a weekly strip.
- Jean Effel
- Moisan
- Jacques Lap
- René Pétillon

It also publishes a quarterly magazine, Les Dossiers du Canard, dedicated to one subject, usually one affecting French society, or world events as seen from a French perspective.

== Scandals related to Le Canard enchaîné ==
=== Plumbers affair ===
On 3 December 1973, policemen of the Directorate of Territorial Surveillance (DST), disguised as plumbers, were caught trying to install a spy microphone in the directorial office of Le Canard. The resulting scandal forced Interior Minister Raymond Marcellin to leave the government, though it is said that Marcellin was a scapegoat for other members of the government, especially the Defense Minister, who was intent on knowing the identities of informers for the newspaper.

=== Robert Boulin affair ===
A series of articles accusing long-serving Gaullist minister and possible prime ministerial candidate Robert Boulin of involvement in dubious real estate deals was followed by Boulin's mysterious death (October 1979), presumed to be suicide. Following his death, major officials publicly accused Le Canard enchaîné of the moral responsibility for Boulin's death, and there were broad hints the government might use the reaction to the Boulin death to seek stricter libel laws, as was done in the 1930s after the suicide of Roger Salengro.

Jacques Chaban-Delmas, then President of the National Assembly, who had been politically identified with Boulin for many years, told a special memorial session of the Assembly that it should "draw the lessons of this tragedy, of this assassination". After meeting with President Valéry Giscard d'Estaing, Prime Minister Raymond Barre called for "meditation upon the consequences of certain ignominies", and spoke of "a baseness". President Giscard d'Estaing also added to the criticism: Boulin, he said, "was unable to resist the campaign of harassment he was subjected to. Public opinion should severely condemn any other similar campaigns."

== Notable investigations ==
- Marthe Hanau affair (1928)
- Albert Oustric affair (1930)
- Stavisky Affair (1934)
- Cardinal Jean Daniélou's death in the house of a prostitute (1974)
- Bokassa's diamonds (1980s)
- The Canard fought to bring to light evidence of alleged corruption during President Jacques Chirac's tenure as mayor of Paris. (see: Chirac's role in Parisian corruption scandals)
- Contaminated blood scandal (1990s, in French)
- Yann Piat (a former far-right National Front MP, assassinated on 25 February 1994)
- Affair Elf–Dumas (1998)
- The Canard made efforts to uncover the Nazi past of former Paris chief of police Maurice Papon (1981).
- The revelations by the Canard about Finance Minister Hervé Gaymard's lavish state-funded apartment led to his resignation in 2005.
- Fillon affair (Penelopegate): revelations which accuse Penelope Fillon, wife of politician François Fillon, of alleged fictitious employment, as her husband's parliamentary assistant for a total salary of 900,000 euros over eight years on the one hand, and as a "literary adviser" of Revue des deux Mondes on the other, in January 2017.

== Ownership ==
The Canard is published by Les Éditions Maréchal-Le Canard enchaîné (Maurice and Jeanne Maréchal founded the Canard), which is privately owned; the main associates are Michel Gaillard (CEO and director of publication), André Escaro, Nicolas Brimo, Erik Emptaz and employees of the newspaper.

Because it does not accept advertisements (being free of sponsors), being entirely privately owned (being the same,) and because its publishing costs are met by its sales, Le Canard Enchaîné is considered one of (if not the) most objective French publications—hence its continued existence.

== Business ==
Despite declining newspaper circulations in France and other locations, Canard's profit continues to increase, owning cash reserves and property worth a total of 110 million euros. Part of Canard's growth may be attributed to its shorter print length, restricting itself to eight pages of two-colour newsprint each week.

Circulation has risen by a third since 2007, its scandal-fuelled growth having seen a rise to 700,000 copies printed and sold each week. Its net profit in 2009 was 5 million euros.

== In popular culture ==
- In the film L'Armée des Ombres, directed by Jean-Pierre Melville, the character Luc Jardie (played by Paul Meurisse), while in London during the German occupation of France during World War II, imagines that his fellow countrymen will be truly liberated when they can see American films and once more read Le Canard enchaîné, alluding to the censorship of the Vichy Regime.
- In the TV film Notable donc coupable (2007) (translation: Well-to-do hence guilty), the fictional weekly Le Canardeur is modelled on Le Canard enchaîné.

== See also ==
- Political scandals in France
- Albert Algoud
- Le Tintamarre
