= Stéphane Le Foll =

French politician (born 1960)

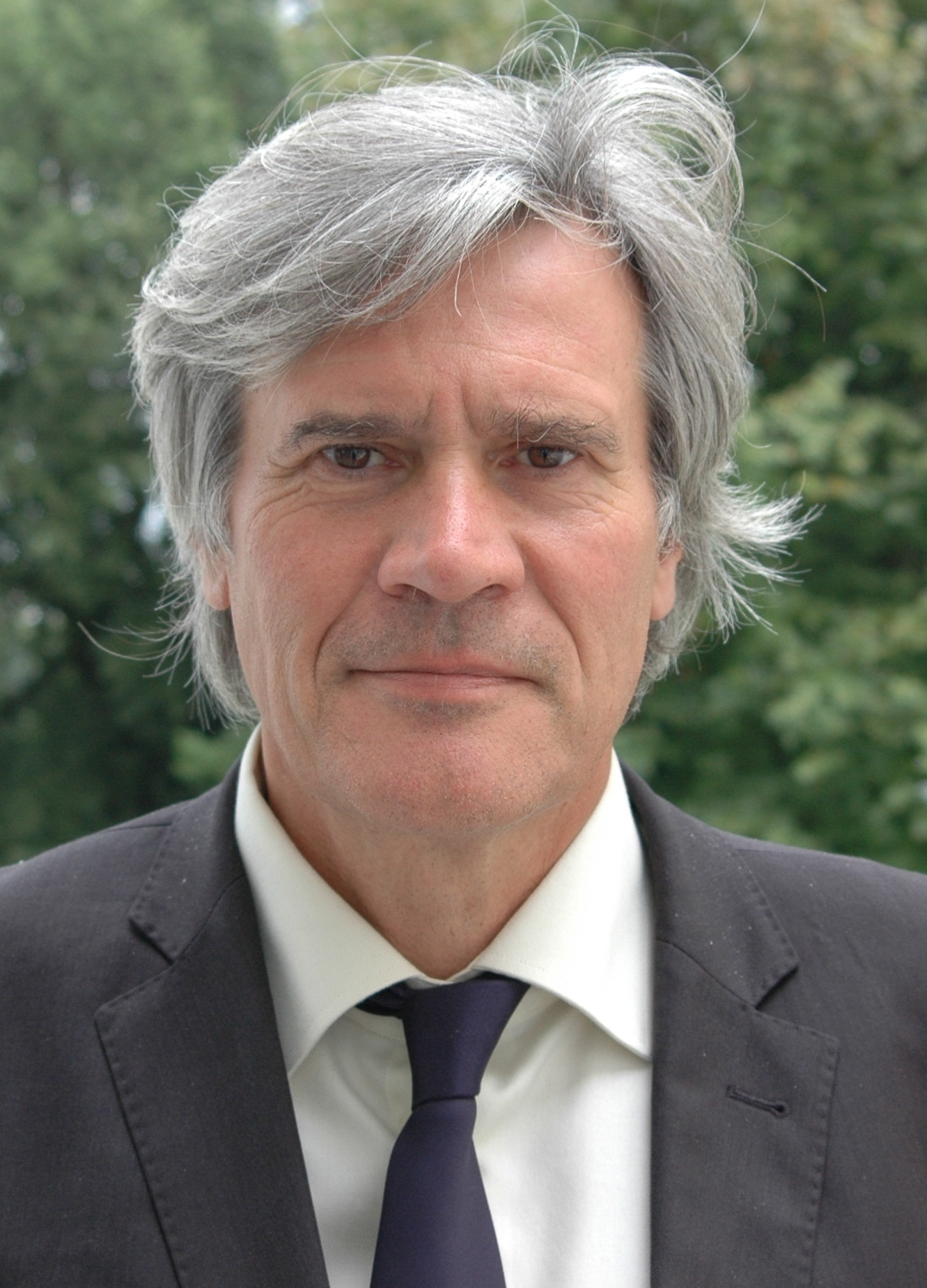

Mayor of Le Mans
- Incumbent
- Assumed office 14 June 2018
- Preceded by: Jean-Claude Boulard

Member of the National Assembly for Sarthe's 4th constituency
- In office 18 June 2017 – 11 July 2018
- Preceded by: Sylvie Tolmont
- Succeeded by: Sylvie Tolmont

Government Spokesman
- In office 2 April 2014 – 17 May 2017
- Prime Minister: Manuel Valls; Bernard Cazeneuve
- Preceded by: Najat Vallaud-Belkacem
- Succeeded by: Christophe Castaner

Minister of Agriculture, Agrifood and Forestry
- In office 16 May 2012 – 17 May 2017
- Prime Minister: Jean-Marc Ayrault; Manuel Valls; Bernard Cazeneuve
- Preceded by: Bruno Le Maire
- Succeeded by: Jacques Mézard

Member of the European Parliament
- In office 20 July 2004 – 15 May 2012
- Constituency: West France

Personal details
- Born: 3 February 1960 (age 66) Le Mans, France
- Party: Socialist Party
- Spouse: Marie-Hélène Bourdais
- Children: 1
- Education: University of Nantes; Conservatoire national des arts et métiers

Stéphane Le Foll (French pronunciation: [stefan lə fɔl]; born 3 February 1960) is a French politician serving as Mayor of Le Mans since 2018. A member of the Socialist Party, he was Minister of Agriculture under President François Hollande from 2012 to 2017.

== Political career ==
=== Member of the European Parliament, 2004–2012 ===
Born in Le Mans, Le Foll was elected to the European Parliament for the Socialist Party, part of Party of European Socialists, in 2004.

In parliament, Le Foll was a member of the Committee on Agriculture and Rural Development. From 2010 to 2012, he also served on the Special committee on the policy challenges and budgetary resources for a sustainable European Union after 2013. In addition to his committee assignments, he was part of the Parliament's Delegation for relations with the Palestinian Legislative Council.

Le Foll served until 2012, when he was appointed to the Government of France.

=== Minister of Agriculture, 2012–2017 ===
Le Foll successfully stood as a candidate for the National Assembly in the 2012 legislative election, but he resigned to become Minister of Agriculture; fellow party member Sylvie Tolmont took the seat.

As Minister of Agriculture in all governments appointed by François Hollande, Le Foll was in charge of reforming the Common Agricultural Policy. He also put an accent on "re-socialising rural territories in France". In 2014, he replaced Najat Vallaud-Belkacem as government spokesperson under Prime Minister Manuel Valls, holding the weekly press briefing at the Élysée Palace. Notably, Le Foll unveiled in 2015 a set of financial support measures for livestock farmers whose total value his ministry put at 600 million euros ($655 million), in response to protests by meat and dairy producers facing low prices and high costs. In 2016, he announced a 290 million euro ($314 million) plan to help livestock farmers protesting against a slump in pork and milk prices, and poultry farmers facing a freeze in output due to the spread of bird flu.

In 2016, Le Foll became the longest-serving Minister of Agriculture since the office was established in 1836.

=== Mayor of Le Mans, 2018–present ===
Le Foll was reelected to the National Assembly in 2017. He unsuccessfully stood for the leadership of the Socialist Party at the Aubervilliers Congress in 2018.

After the death of Jean-Claude Boulard in 2018, Le Foll became Mayor of Le Mans. He was succeeded by Tolmont in Parliament, his predecessor. In October 2021, he lost out against Anne Hidalgo in the Socialist primary for the 2022 French presidential election.

Political offices
Preceded by Bruno Le Maire	Minister of Agriculture, Agrifood and Forestry; 2012–2017	Succeeded by Jacques Mézard
