= Penelope Fillon =

Wife of French former politician François Fillon

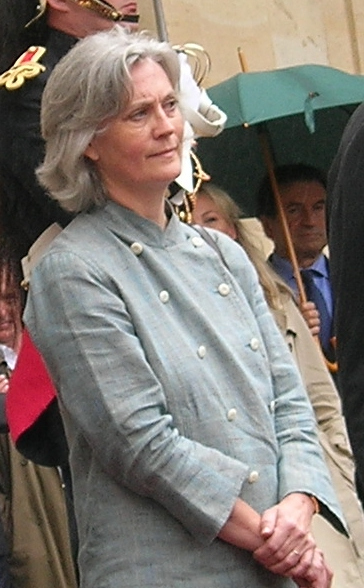
- Fillon in 2007

Municipal councillor of Solesmes
- Incumbent
- Assumed office 23 March 2014
- Mayor: Myriam Lambert; Pascal Lelièvre

Spouse of the Prime Minister of France
- In office 17 May 2007 – 10 May 2012
- Prime Minister: François Fillon
- Preceded by: Marie-Laure de Villepin
- Succeeded by: Brigitte Ayrault

Personal details
- Born: Penelope Kathryn Clarke; 31 July 1955 (age 71) Llanover, Monmouthshire, Wales
- Party: Union for a Popular Movement (before 2015); The Republicans (2015–present)
- Spouse: François Fillon (m. 1980)
- Children: 5
- Education: University College London; University of Bristol

Penelope Kathryn Fillon (née Clarke, 31 July 1955) is the Welsh wife of French former politician François Fillon. She was the Spouse of the Prime Minister of France from 17 May 2007 to 10 May 2012. Born and raised in Wales, Fillon is a graduate of the University College London and the University of Bristol Law School. She worked as an English teacher at a secondary school in France in the late 1970s, where she met her future husband. François and Penelope Fillon married in 1980 and have five children. They are Catholic.

Throughout her husband's political career, she has remained fairly uninvolved in national politics and has mostly stayed out of the public eye, and has been labelled "discreet" by the media. Despite her reputation as being private, Fillon ran for a seat on the municipal council of the Solesmes, Sarthe commune in which she and her husband reside. When François Fillon began running for the French presidency in 2017, she emerged in the public eye to campaign for her husband.

Penelope Fillon rose to prominence in January 2017, when French newspaper Le Canard enchaîné published an article in which she was accused of being paid €500,000 in public money over eight years as her husband's "assistant" while performing no or very little work. The public outcry that followed led the controversy to be labelled "Penelopegate" by some, despite her husband denying any wrongdoing.

== Biography ==
=== Early life and education ===
Penelope Kathryn Clarke was born on 31 July 1955 in Llanover, Monmouthshire, Wales, United Kingdom. The daughter of George "Colin" Clarke, an English solicitor, and Glenys, a Wales native, she considers herself "Anglo-Welsh."

Fillon attended primary and secondary school at King Henry VIII School in Abergavenny, studying French, German, and English. She went on to attend University College London, earning a degree in French and German. She spent her final year before earning her degree as a teaching assistant of English at a middle school in Le Mans, France. It was there she met François Fillon for the first time. She described the encounter in 2007:

"I was invited to a dinner and he was there. Of course I remember the dinner but, no, it wasn't a particularly heart-stopping moment."

Fillon continued her education at the University of Bristol, earning a degree in law. She intended to become a lawyer like her father, and qualified as a solicitor. Rather than starting her career, however, she decided to pursue her relationship with François. She described her choice:

"He would come over on the ferry and the night train to see me. Then when I finished my Law Society exams we decided to get married and I came to live in France, accepting that it would be for good."

Penelope Clarke married François Fillon on 28 June 1980 in a civil ceremony in the groom's native Sarthe. The religious ceremony was held in the 17th-century St Bartholomew's Church in the bride's native village of Llanover. Shortly after, François's brother Pierre, and Penelope's sister Jane also married.

=== Career and political activity ===
Shortly after their marriage, François and Penelope moved to Paris. In 1981, they relocated to her husband's home region of Sarthe. While her husband pursued his political career three days a week in Paris, Fillon remained at home with their growing family.

For much of her husband's political career, Fillon stayed home to care for their five children, and when François was a government minister, the family resided in an apartment in Paris's 6th arrondissement. When he was elected Prime Minister of France in 2007, the family moved to the Hôtel Matignon, living there until his term ended in 2012.

In 2014, her husband François Fillon chose not to run for re-election to the municipal council of Solesmes, Sarthe, the small commune of 1,500 people in which the Fillons reside. At the mayor's request, Fillon ran for his former seat, running as the Union for a Popular Movement candidate. She was elected, and has served on the council since 2014.

=== 2017 presidential election ===
In 2017, François Fillon commenced his campaign for the French presidency. Fillon, who for much of her husband's political career had remained in relative obscurity, emerged to campaign for him and especially to try to reach the female vote, representing the movement "Women with Fillon".

== Personal life ==
François and Penelope Fillon have five children: Marie (born 1982) and Charles (born 1984), both lawyers, Antoine (born 1985) and Edouard (born 1989), who both work in finance, and Arnaud (born 2001), who was a high school student. They also have three grandchildren.

Fillon supports the Wales rugby team.

== Fictitious employment controversy ==
In January 2017, Le Canard enchaîné published an article in which Penelope Fillon was accused of alleged fictitious employment, as her husband's "assistante parlementaire" for a total salary of €500,000 over eight years on the one hand, and as a "literary adviser" of Revue des deux Mondes on the other, with a monthly salary of €5,000, amounting to a total of another €100,000. A preliminary hearing immediately opened. The public outcry around this so-called "Penelopegate" was such that doubts were voiced about François Fillon himself, who was at the time the frontrunner for the 2017 presidential election, with an immediate sharp decline in the opinion polls.

On 31 January, new reporting by Le Canard enchaîné found that Penelope Fillon was actually paid €300,000 more than previously reported, for a total sum of €831,440 for 15 years of her parliamentary assistant work. It also reported that Fillon had paid two of his children €84,000 for little apparent actual work.

On 6 February 2017 Fillon held a press conference. He said "It was a mistake and I apologize to the French [people]" but also said that the salary of his wife was "perfectly justified". However, on 28 March 2017, she was placed under formal investigation following a day of questioning by magistrates.

In June 2020, Fillon was convicted of embezzlement of public funds and sentenced to three years imprisonment. Her sentence was suspended and she vowed to appeal the conviction.

On 9 May 2022, a French appeals court reduced Filon's sentence to a two-year suspended prison sentence. Her husband's prison sentence would be shortened to four years with three years suspended. The court maintained fines of €375,000 for each of them.
