= Candide (1924) =

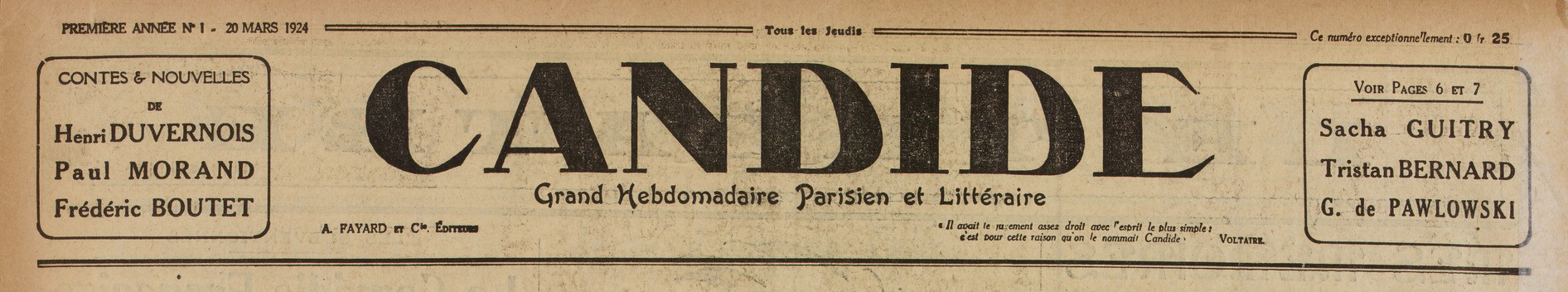
- Type: Newspaper
- Publisher: Fayard
- Founded: March 20, 1924
- Ceased publication: August 9, 1944
- Language: French
- Headquarters: Paris
- Country: France
- ISSN: 1255-9911

Candide was a French weekly newspaper aligned with the far-right Maurrassian nationalist and antisemitic movements. It was published between 1924 and 1944.

The name Candide was adopted in 1924 by a weekly launched by the Arthème Fayard publishing house. This newspaper was one of the main political and literary weeklies of the Interwar period, inspiring similar publications like Gringoire on the far-right and Vendredi and Marianne on the left. Candide itself was rooted in the Charles Maurras's Integral nationalism.

Key figures such as Pierre Gaxotte, the personal secretary to Charles Maurras, served on its editorial board until 1940. Other contributors included Lucien Dubech as a drama critic, Dominique Sordet for music, Maurice Pefferkorn for sports, and Abel Manouvriez for legal reporting, all of whom held similar roles at L'Action française. Rising Maurrassian talents such as Lucien Rebatet and Robert Brasillach also contributed to Candide. The newspaper's illustrations, especially the caricatures by Sennep, were widely appreciated.

The weekly espoused anti-parliamentarian, anti-republican, anti-communist, and anti-democratic views, explicitly advocating "resolute antisemitism" and showing strong support for Italian fascism. Following the 6 February 1934 crisis, Candide became more radical along with much of the far-right and sections of the mainstream right. However, it did not adopt the overtly militant fascism of Je suis partout and maintained a lighter tone. Its hostility toward Jews and foreigners became more pronounced. While initially warning against the German threat, Candide supported the Munich Agreement, aligning with the Maurrassian movement's shifting stance.

Printed in a large format (43 x 60 cm), the newspaper achieved a circulation of 80,000 copies in its first year, rising to nearly 150,000 in 1930 and over 340,000 from 1936 onwards, even reaching 465,000 according to Professor Pierre Albert. It wielded considerable influence in conservative and reactionary political circles, and its literary section was respected beyond its ideological base. Contributors included figures such as Albert Thibaudet, who died in 1936, and Georges Duhamel ("Le parc national du silence," Issue 373, May 7, 1931).

By 1936, Candide focused on warning its readers about an imminent communist coup in France.

In 1939, following the fall of the Second Spanish Republic, Candide expressed strong opposition to the arrival of Spanish refugees in France, stating: "All the dregs, all the underworld of Barcelona, all the assassins, Chekists, executioners, grave robbers of Carmelite nuns, all the thieves, all the sacrilegious looters, all the Thénardiers of the riot are pouring onto our soil".

During the German occupation of France, Candide relocated from Paris to Clermont-Ferrand the zone libre and supported Pétain's National Revolution, whose policies closely aligned with its political agenda, especially after 1934–1936. However, it avoided the overt collaborationism of Paris-based publications like Je suis partout. The newspaper ceased publication following the Liberation of France, as it was banned due to its association with the Vichy regime.

Other contributors included Georges Blond, Irène Némirovsky, and Edmond Jaloux.
