= Élise Leboucher =

French politician (born 1982)

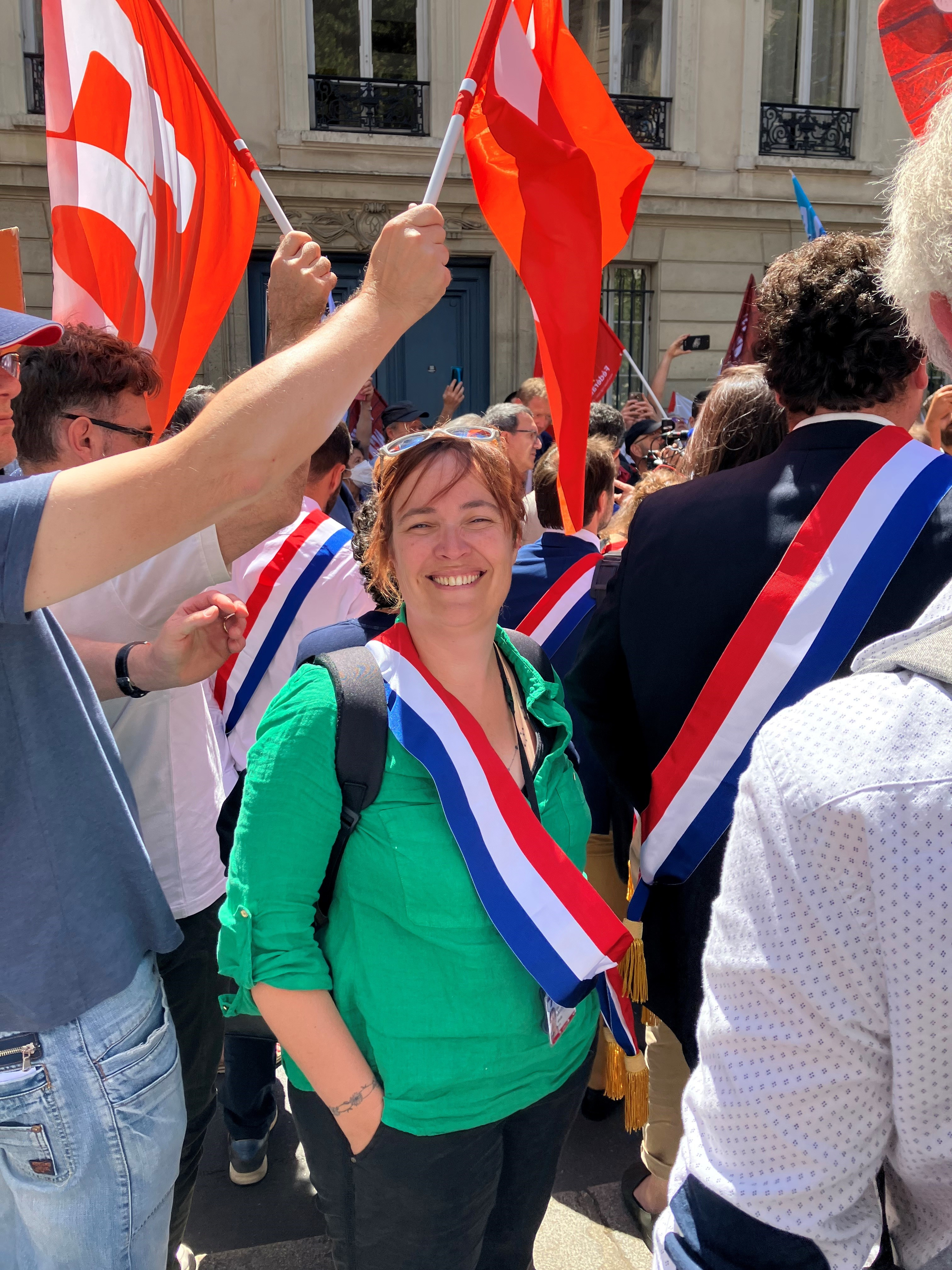
- Élise Leboucher in 2022

Member of the National Assembly for Sarthe's 4th constituency
- Incumbent
- Assumed office 22 June 2022
- Preceded by: Sylvie Tolmont

Personal details
- Born: 9 October 1982 (age 44) Ernée, France
- Party: La France Insoumise
- Other political affiliations: NUPES (2022)

Élise Leboucher (born 9 October 1982) is a French politician from La France Insoumise. She was elected to the National Assembly in Sarthe's 4th constituency in the 2022 French legislative election, unseating Socialist Party MP Sylvie Tolmont. She was reelected in 2024, defeating Marie-Caroline Le Pen, the sister of Marine Le Pen, by a margin of 225 votes.

== See also ==
- List of deputies of the 16th National Assembly of France
