= François-Henri Briard =

French lawyer (born 1957)

Personal details
- Born: François-Henri Briard; 10 September 1957 Saint-Mandé, France
- Profession: Lawyer

François-Henri Briard (French pronunciation: [fʁɑ̃swa‿ɑ̃ʁi‿bʁijɑʁ]) is a French Supreme Court Attorney born the 10 September 1957. Chairman of the Vergennes Institute, founded in 1993 with Supreme Court Associate Justice Antonin Scalia, to whom he was close. He is a member of the Federalist society, of the Supreme Court Historical Society, of the Society of the Cincinnati and of the Académie de Versailles.

== Early life ==
Born into a military family, Briard is a graduate of Sciences Po Paris and the University of Paris II Panthéon-Assas. He is a Supreme Court Attorney since 1988.

== Career ==
He is best known as the attorney of François Fillon, former French Prime Minister. He also acted as counsel for Nicaraguan workers against the Dow Chemical Company and in favor of François Compaoré, brother of the former Burkina Faso's president.

He maintains close ties with the American world, and provides interpretation and commentary for French-speaking audiences. Briard was received in a private audience at the White House by Presidents George W. Bush and Donald Trump and attended the swearing-in ceremony of President Barack Obama on 20 January 2009. Briard looks at the issue of concealing the face in public spaces.

François-Henri Briard was a trustee of Sarah Lawrence College in New York for eight years.

He was an auditor at the IHEDN.

He has published the book Vivre libre (2021) and he is a defender of freedom of speech.

== Bibliography (non-exhaustive) ==
=== Books ===
- Vivre Libre, Ipanema, 2021, 186 p.
- Le virus de la liberté, Ipanema, 2022, 205 p.

=== Articles ===
- (with Stéphane Bonichot), "La Cour Suprême des États-Unis : enjeu et arbitre de l'élection du 5 novembre", in Conflits, 2024.
- (with Marine Ancel) "La dérogation « Espèces protégées »", in Florilèges du droit de l'environnement, La Mémoire du Droit, 2024.
- "La nomination des membres de la Cour suprême des États-Unis", in Nouv. Cahiers du Conseil constitutionnel (2018/1 N° 58), p. 59-70.
- "Libres propos sur la Cour suprême des États-Unis", in Revue belge de droit constitutionnel, July 2013, n° 2012–3–4, p. 301-307.
- "Droits de l'homme et psychothérapie", in Journal français de psychiatrie (2004/1), p. 19-20.
- "La Cour suprême des Etats-Unis d'Amérique et le procès équitable" in Mélanges Pactet. L'esprit des institutions, l'équilibre des pouvoirs, Dalloz, 2003, p. 503.

== Awards and honours ==
- Legion of Honour;
- National Order of Merit;
- Order of Academic Palms;
- Prix de la Réserve militaire.
