= Sylvie Tolmont =

French politician (born 1962)

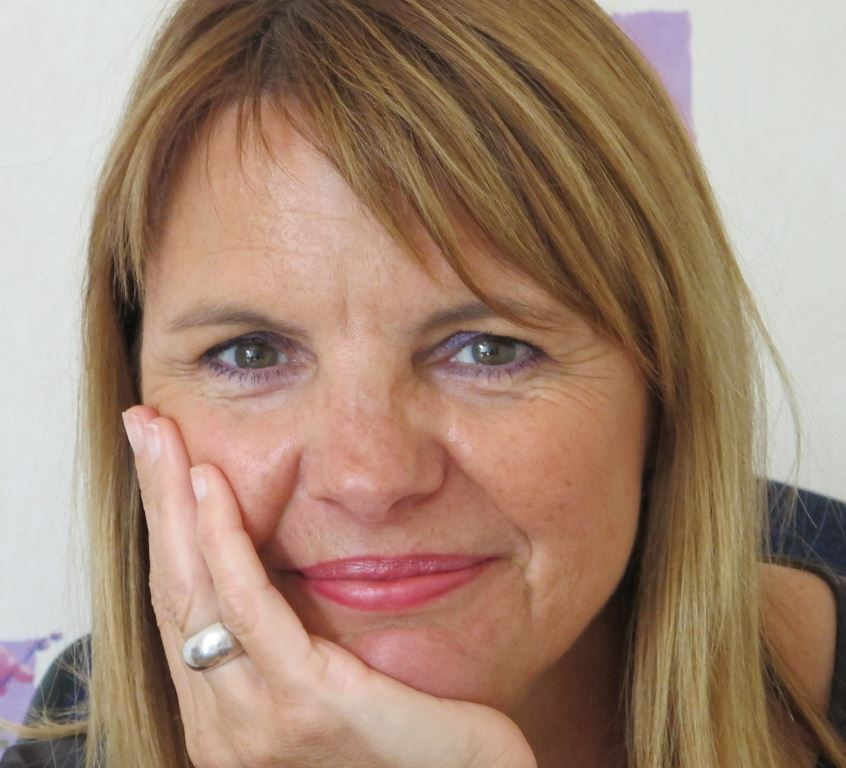

Member of the National Assembly for Sarthe's 4th constituency
- In office 20 June 2012 – 21 June 2022
- Preceded by: Stéphane Le Foll
- Succeeded by: Elise Leboucher

Personal details
- Born: 9 October 1962 (age 63) Le Mans, France
- Party: Socialist

Sylvie Tolmont (French pronunciation: [silvi tɔlmɔ̃]; born 9 October 1962) is a French politician from the Socialist Party, who has been the member of the National Assembly for Sarthe's 4th constituency from 2012 until 2022.

On 9 March 2020, during the COVID-19 pandemic in France, she tested positive for the virus.

In the 2022 French legislative election, she stood for re-election opposed to NUPES. She lost her seat coming fourth place in the first round.
