= Le Crapouillot =

French magazine

- Frequency: Irregular
- Founder: Jean Galtier-Boissière
- First issue: August 1915
- Final issue: 1996
- Country: France
- Based in: Paris
- Language: French
- OCLC: 504202990

Le Crapouillot was a French magazine started by Jean Galtier-Boissière as a satiric publication in France, during World War I. In the trenches during World War I, the affectionate term for le petit crapaud, "the little toad" was used by French soldiers, the poilus, to designate small trench-mortars.

== Muckraking and satirical period ==
The first issue of Le Crapouillot was published in August 1915, carrying the subtitle "Courage les civils!" ("Take heart, civilians!"). It was distributed at first, by Boissière, to his fellow soldiers. It was "insolent", "non-conformist" and carried the spirit of "both the avant-garde of the belle époque and libertarian politics". It was also a muckraking publication, focusing on sensitive subjects of its such as the origins and causes of the Great War; French soldiers' mutinies; wartime homosexuality and prostitution in the Army; Entente propaganda; etc.

In 1925, the magazine became a monthly. From 1961 to 1964 it was published four issues per year. Until its close in 1990 the frequency of the magazine was irregular.

== Political period ==
After France was liberated from the German occupation in 1944, the magazine took a stand against the purges conducted against collaborators among the nationalist intelligentsia, such as the trial and execution of Robert Brasillach. Throughout the Fourth and early French Fifth Republics, and until its creator's death in 1966, the publication gradually became a forum for articles, reports and editorials written by French nationalists, including ex-Vichy collaborators, Holocaust deniers, right-wing anarchists, and neo-fascists, culminating in its final years, into a magazine strictly of the Extreme Right.

The nationalist journalist Roland Gaucher was its owner and chief editor between from 1991 to 1994. The publication of Le Crapouillot continued until 1996.

== See also ==
- Je suis partout magazine
