= François Fillon =

Prime Minister of France from 2007 to 2012

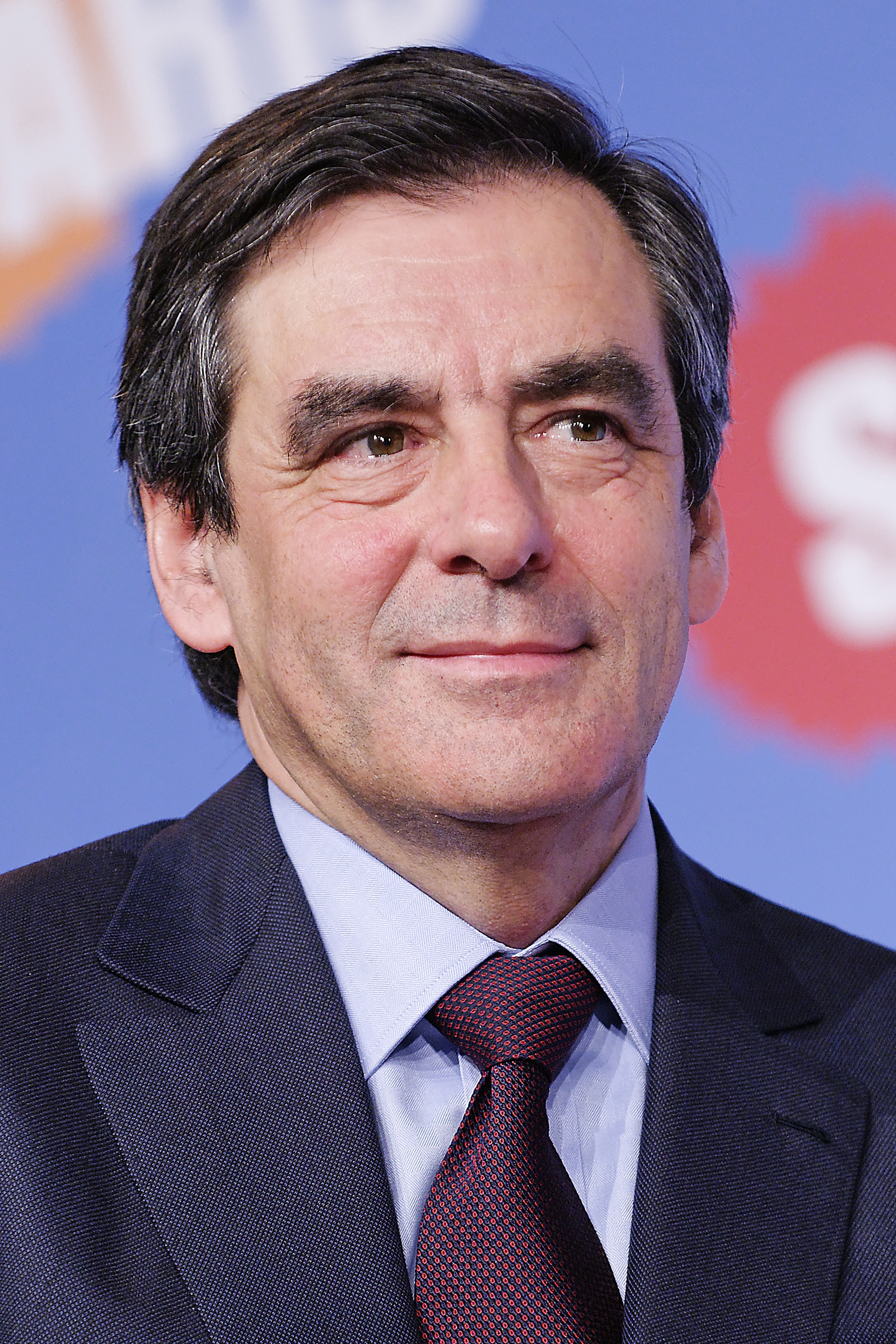
- Fillon in 2010

Prime Minister of France
- In office 17 May 2007 – 15 May 2012
- President: Nicolas Sarkozy
- Preceded by: Dominique de Villepin
- Succeeded by: Jean-Marc Ayrault

Member of the National Assembly for Paris's 2nd constituency
- In office 20 June 2012 – 20 June 2017
- Preceded by: Jean Tiberi
- Succeeded by: Gilles Le Gendre

Minister of Ecology, Sustainable Development, Transport and Housing
- In office 23 February 2012 – 16 May 2012
- Prime Minister: Himself
- Preceded by: Nathalie Kosciusko-Morizet
- Succeeded by: Nicole Bricq (Ecology, Sustainable Development and Energy)

Minister of National Education, Higher Education and Research
- In office 31 March 2004 – 31 May 2005
- Prime Minister: Jean-Pierre Raffarin
- Preceded by: Luc Ferry (National Education and Research); François Loos (Higher Education)
- Succeeded by: Gilles de Robien

Minister of Social Affairs, Labour and Solidarity
- In office 7 May 2002 – 30 March 2004
- Prime Minister: Jean-Pierre Raffarin
- Preceded by: Élisabeth Guigou
- Succeeded by: Jean-Louis Borloo

President of the Regional Council of Pays de la Loire
- In office 20 March 1998 – 16 May 2002
- Preceded by: Olivier Guichard
- Succeeded by: Jean-Luc Harousseau

Minister delegate for Posts, Telecommunications and Space
- In office 7 November 1995 – 2 June 1997
- Prime Minister: Alain Juppé
- Preceded by: Himself (Information Technologies and Posts)
- Succeeded by: Christian Pierret

Minister of Information Technologies and Posts
- In office 18 May 1995 – 7 November 1995
- Prime Minister: Alain Juppé
- Preceded by: José Rossi (Industry, Posts and Telecommunications and External Trade)
- Succeeded by: Franck Borotra (Industry, Posts and Telecommunications); Himself (Information Technologies and Posts)

Minister of Higher Education and Research
- In office 30 March 1993 – 11 May 1995
- Prime Minister: Édouard Balladur
- Preceded by: Hubert Curien (Research)
- Succeeded by: François Bayrou

Member of the National Assembly for Sarthe's 4th constituency
- In office 20 June 2007 – 19 July 2007
- Preceded by: Marc Joulaud
- Succeeded by: Marc Joulaud
- In office 12 June 1997 – 19 July 2002
- Preceded by: Pierre Lefebvre
- Succeeded by: Marc Joulaud
- In office 2 July 1981 – 1 May 1993
- Preceded by: René Pailler
- Succeeded by: Pierre Lefebvre

President of the General Council of Sarthe
- In office 20 April 1992 – 20 March 1998
- Preceded by: Michel d'Aillières
- Succeeded by: Roland du Luart

Personal details
- Born: François Charles Amand Fillon; 4 March 1954 (age 72) Le Mans, France
- Party: The Republicans (since 2015)
- Other political affiliations: Rally for the Republic; (until 2002); Union for a Popular Movement (2002–2015)
- Spouse: Penelope Clarke (m. 1980)
- Children: 5
- Education: University of Maine; Paris Descartes University

François Charles Amand Fillon (French: [fʁɑ̃swa ʃaʁl amɑ̃ fijɔ̃]; born 4 March 1954) is a French retired politician who served as Prime Minister of France from 2007 to 2012 under President Nicolas Sarkozy. He was the nominee of The Republicans (previously known as the Union for a Popular Movement), the country's largest centre-right political party, for the 2017 French presidential election in which he ranked third in the first round of voting.

Fillon became Jean-Pierre Raffarin's Minister of Labour in 2002 and undertook controversial reforms of the 35-hour workweek law and of the French retirement system. In 2004, as Minister of National Education he proposed the much debated Fillon law on Education. In 2005, Fillon was elected senator for the Sarthe department. His role as a political advisor in Sarkozy's successful race for president led to his becoming prime minister in 2007. Fillon resigned upon Sarkozy's defeat by François Hollande in the 2012 French presidential elections.

Running on a platform described as conservative, he won the 2016 The Republicans presidential primary, defeating Alain Juppé. Following his victory in the primary, opinion polls showed Fillon as the frontrunner for the 2017 presidential election. In March 2017, he was formally charged in an embezzlement investigation in a case that became known as "Penelopegate" due to the involvement of his wife. In April, he finally came third in the first round with 20%, and was therefore excluded from the runoff between the top two finishers.

In 2020, Fillon was convicted of fraud and misuse of funds, and sentenced to five years in prison (three of them suspended). He has appealed against the sentence. In May 2022, the sentence was shortened to four years in prison (three of them suspended). In June 2025, Fillon was given a four-year suspended sentence for corruption. In December 2021, Fillon was named as a member of the Board of Directors of SIBUR Holding, the largest integrated petrochemical company in Russia. He resigned from this position in February 2022, following the Russian invasion of Ukraine.

== Early life ==
Fillon was born on 4 March 1954 in Le Mans, Sarthe, France. His father, Michel, is a civil law notary, while his mother, Anne Soulet Fillon, is a history professor of Basque descent. His younger brother, Pierre is the president of Automobile Club de l'Ouest, responsible for the organization and management of the 24 Hours of Le Mans auto race. His youngest brother, Dominique, is a pianist and jazz musician.

Fillon received a baccalauréat in 1972. He then studied at the University of Maine in Le Mans where he received a master's degree in public law in 1976. He subsequently received a master of Advanced Studies (diplôme d'études approfondies) in public law from Paris Descartes University.

== Political career ==
=== Governmental functions ===
- Minister of Higher Education and Research: 1993–1995.
- Minister of Information Technologies and Posts: May – November 1995.
- Minister responsible for Posts, Telecommunications and Space: 1995–1997.
- Minister of Social Affairs, Labour and Solidarity: 2002–2004.
- Minister of National Education, Higher Education and Research: 2004–2005.
- Prime minister: 2007–2012.
- February to May 2012: he assumed the functions of the Minister of Ecology, Sustainable Development, Transport and Housing, after the resignation of Nathalie Kosciusko-Morizet who became spokeswoman of Nicolas Sarkozy's presidential campaign.

=== Electoral mandates ===
==== National Assembly of France ====
- President of the Rally-UMP Group in the National Assembly: November 2012 – January 2013.
- Member of the National Assembly for Paris (2nd constituency): 2012–2017.
- Member of the National Assembly for Sarthe (4th constituency): 1981–1993 (became minister in 1993); 1997–2002 (became minister in 2002); re-elected in 2007 but he became prime minister. Elected in 1981, re-elected in 1986, 1988, 1993, 1997, 2002, and 2007.

==== Senate of France ====
- Senator for Sarthe: 2005–2007 (became prime minister in 2007, and he appears again as a member of the National Assembly of France in June 2007). Elected in 2004, remained as minister. Reelected in 2005.

==== Regional Council ====
- President of the Regional Council of Pays de la Loire: 1998–2002 (resignation).
- Vice-president of the Regional Council of Pays de la Loire: 2002–2004.
- Regional councillor of Pays de la Loire: 1998–2007 (Resignation). Reelected in 2004. Elected in Sarthe constituency.

==== General Council ====
- President of the General Council of Sarthe: 1992–1998. Reelected in 1994.
- Vice President of the General Council of Sarthe: 1985–1992.
- General councillor of the Sarthe, elected in the canton of Sablé-sur-Sarthe: 1981–1998. Reelected in 1985, 1992.

==== Municipal Council ====
- Mayor of Sablé-sur-Sarthe : 1983–2001. Reelected in 1989, 1995.
- Municipal councillor of Sablé-sur-Sarthe: 1983–2001. Reelected in 1989, 1995.
- Municipal councillor of Solesmes: 2001–2014. Reelected in 2008.

==== Community of communes Council ====
- President of the Communauté de communes of Sablé-sur-Sarthe: 2001–2012 (resignation). Reelected in 2008.
- Member of the Communauté de communes of Sablé-sur-Sarthe: 2001–2014. Reelected in 2008.

=== Prime minister ===
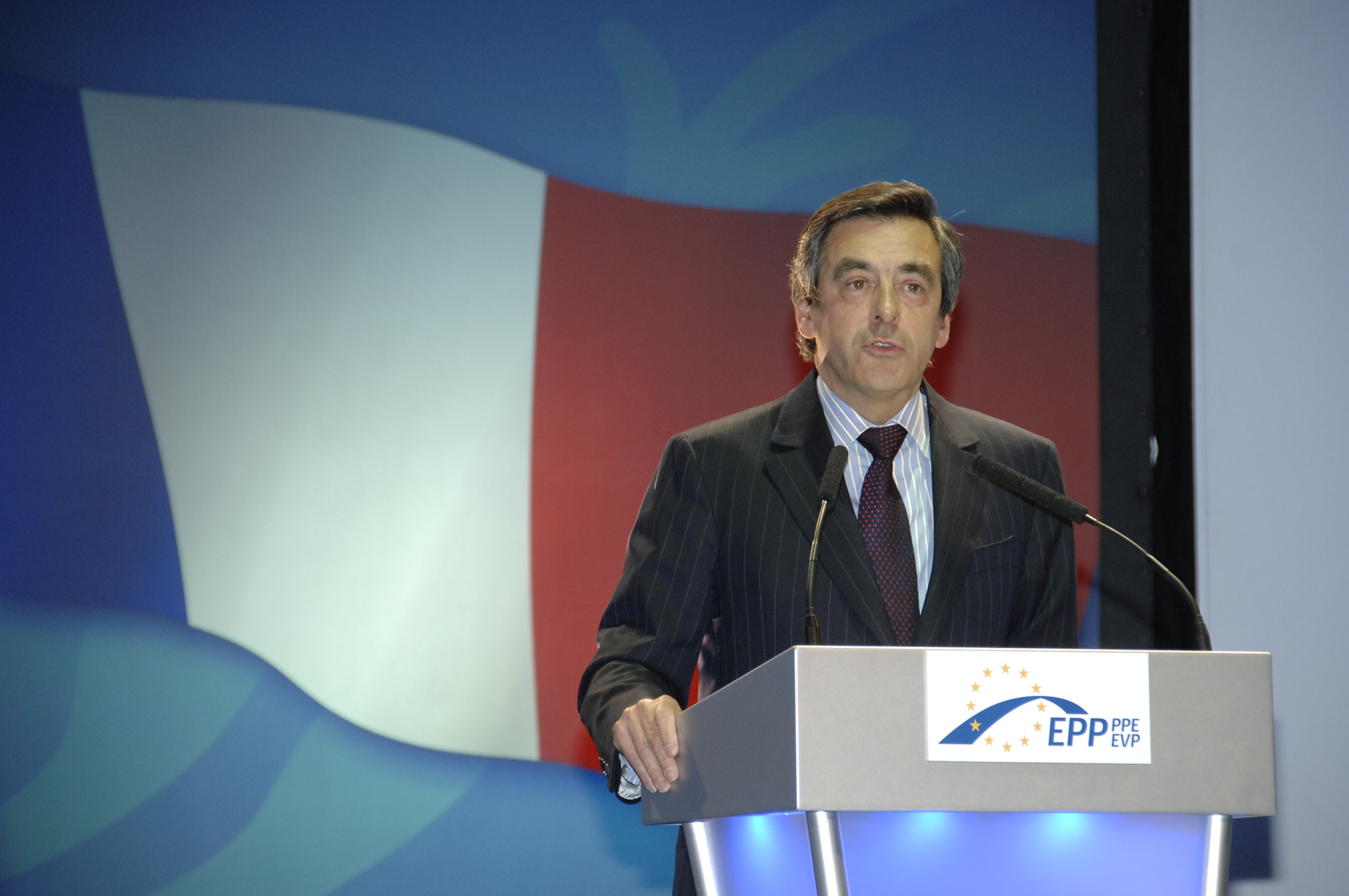
François Fillon speaking in Warsaw

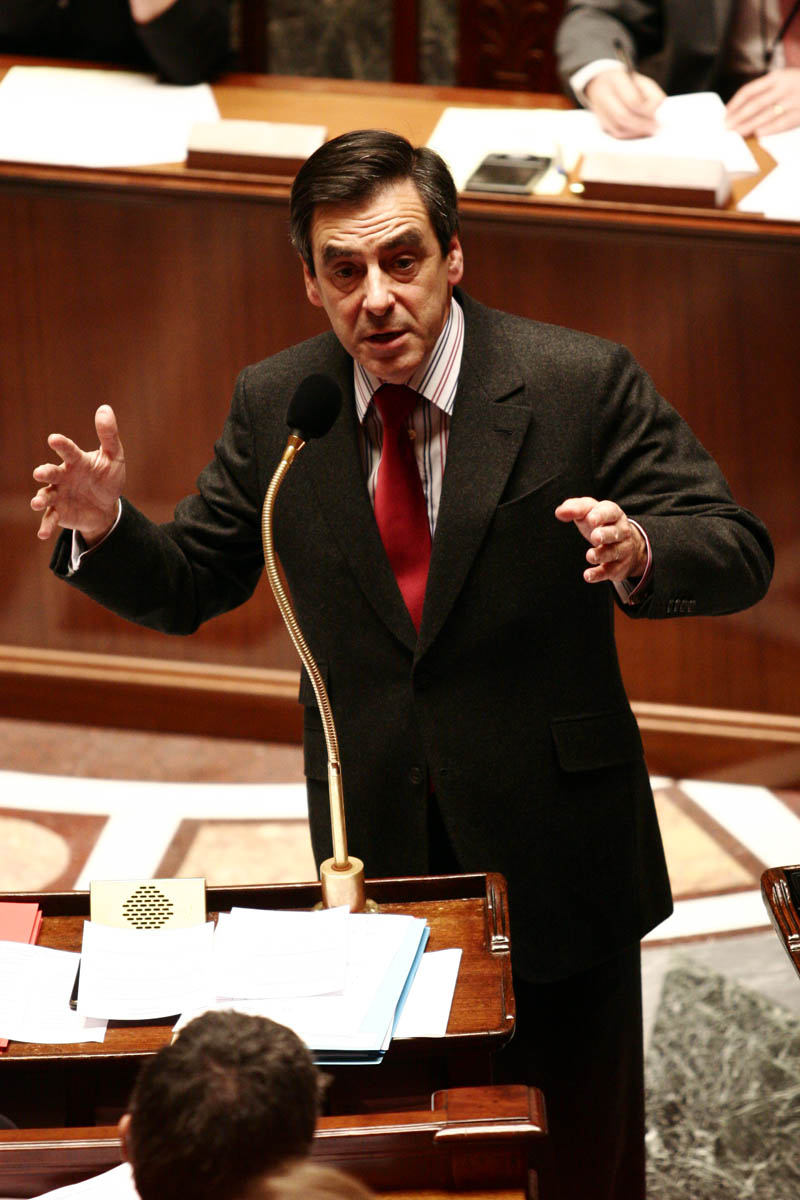
François Fillon speaking in front of the National Assembly

The day after Nicolas Sarkozy became president he appointed Fillon as Prime Minister of France, charging him with the task of forming a new cabinet, which was announced on 18 May 2007. By appointing as Secretary of State André Santini, who had been indicted in the Fondation Hamon affair on charges of corruption, Fillon made the first break since 1992 with the "Balladur jurisprudence", according to which an indicted governmental personality should resign until the case is closed. On 13 November 2010, Fillon resigned, paving the way for a cabinet reshuffle. One day later Sarkozy reappointed Fillon as prime minister, allowing Fillon to formally name a new cabinet.

Following the defeat of Sarkozy to François Hollande in the 2012 French presidential election, Fillon resigned on 10 May. Following the inauguration of Hollande as president on 15 May 2012, Jean-Marc Ayrault, Mayor of Nantes, was appointed to succeed Fillon as prime minister.

=== UMP presidential election ===
Aiming at building consensus within the diverging views at the UMP after Francois Hollande's victory in the French presidential elections in 2012, Fillon declared his candidacy to become the President of the UMP party. On the day of the vote, both candidates (Fillon and Jean-François Copé) claimed victory and accused the other of cheating. This led to a major political crisis within the party with votes being recounted twice and Copé finally being declared winner.

Fillon threatened to split from UMP unless new elections were organised. He formed a new parliamentary faction, the Rassemblement-UMP group. In December 2012, Copé agreed to organising elections in 2013, thus putting an end to the crisis.

=== Presidential bid ===
Fillon entered the 2016 The Republicans presidential primary, held on 20 November 2016, and seemed a likely third as late as a week before the vote. In early counting, Fillon emerged as the clear frontrunner, with Alain Juppé in second place. Third place Sarkozy conceded, bringing his support to Fillon, and Fillon and Juppé went into the runoff on 27 November 2016. Juppé conceded to Fillon, pledging his support for him as The Republicans' nominee in the 2017 French presidential election.

As of November 2016, Fillon was seen as the frontrunner for the presidency against the Socialist candidate Benoît Hamon, Emmanuel Macron and Marine Le Pen. However, revelations of series of political scandals at the end of January shattered his presidential bid, with polls rapidly showing him behind both Marine Le Pen and Emmanuel Macron and out of the runoff. Fillon's visits on the ground attracted protesters who further destabilised his campaign. The news provoked consternation in Germany where Fillon was seen as a serious and trusted candidate. On 23 April 2017, he secured 20.0% of the votes at the first round of the French presidential election, arriving third, and therefore failing to enter the runoff.

== Political positions ==
=== Economy, budget, and taxation ===
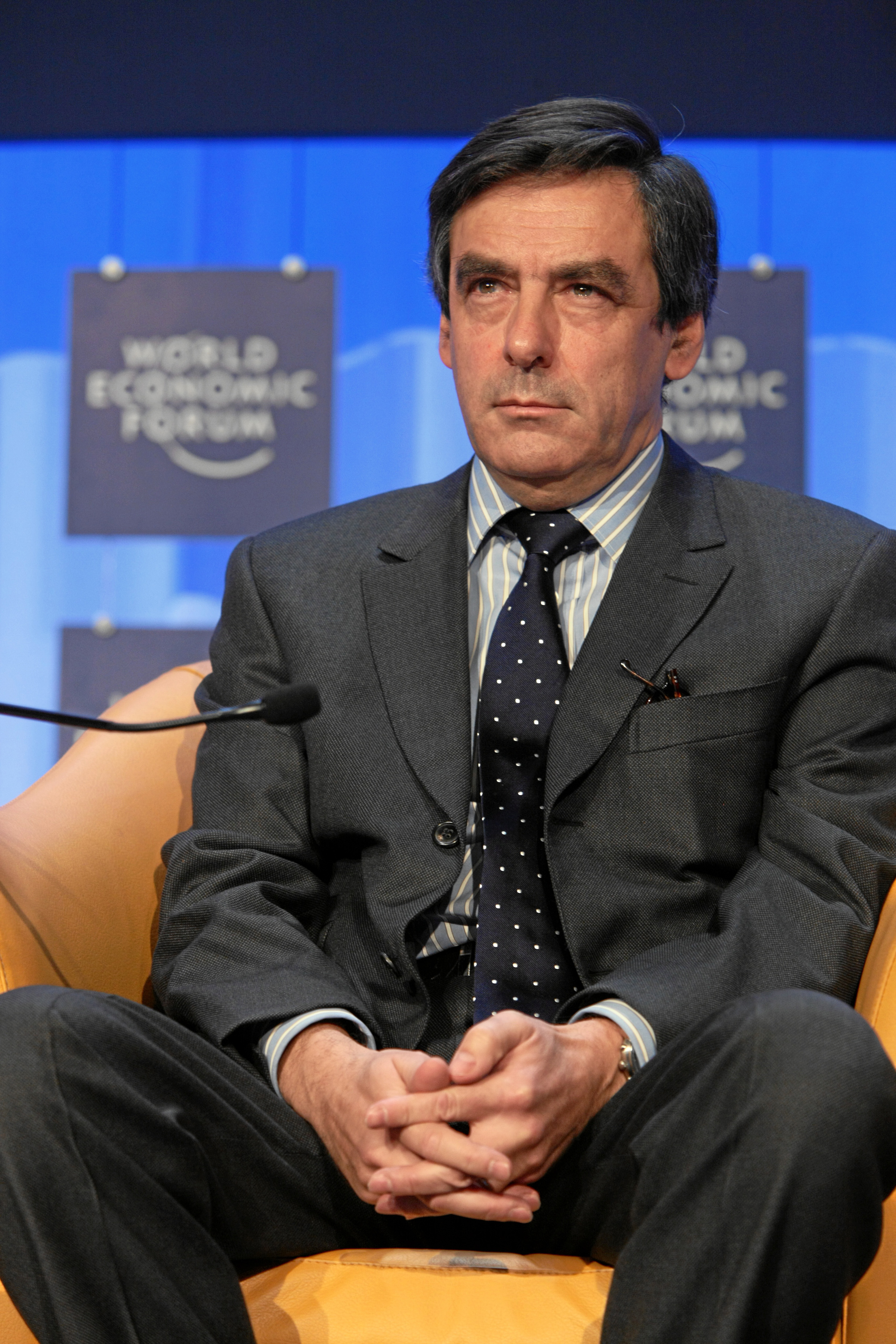
Fillon attending the 2008 Davos World Economic Forum

Fillon has been described as economically liberal (also known as fiscally conservative). For many observers, he is more liberal than his mentor Philippe Séguin. A few months after taking office as prime minister, he declared that he was "at the head of a state that is bankrupt financially, ... which for 15 years has been in chronic deficit, ... that has not voted a balanced budget for 25 years." He then committed publicly to "bring the state budget to balance by the end of the five-year", and reiterated this promise in 2012, and proposed a referendum on registration of the fiscal golden rule in the Constitution. In defending a policy of controlling the deficit, Fillon is in favour of abolishing the wealth tax, which he considers one of the causes of the debt of France. According to him, this tax discourages foreign entrepreneurs. This tax would be offset by the creation of a top slice of income tax to 50%, which would be included in the CSG.

As a presidential candidate, Fillon aimed to reduce the public sector and cut 500,000 civil-service jobs. Fillon was compared to Margaret Thatcher due to his ambition to reduce the size of the state. He said in 2016 that he wanted the state healthcare program (securité sociale) to work better with fewer payments. Fillon also said that he was in favour of increasing the retirement age to 65. During the 2012 presidential election, he proposed that each job seeker should be offered vocational training and be forced to accept the employment offered to them after training.

=== Domestic policy ===
Fillon' stances on domestic and social issues are mostly perceived as conservative. As member of the National Assembly, he voted against the equalisation of the age of consent for homosexual relations in 1982, against civil solidarity pacts in 1999, and against the legalisation of same-sex marriage in 2013; however, he said he would not ban the same-sex marriage law if elected president. He expressed opposition to adoption by same-sex couples. Fillon also stated that he is personally opposed to abortion but would not vote to ban it. Fillon blamed the 2017 social unrest in French Guiana on President Hollande's policies, which he said had failed.

=== Foreign policy ===
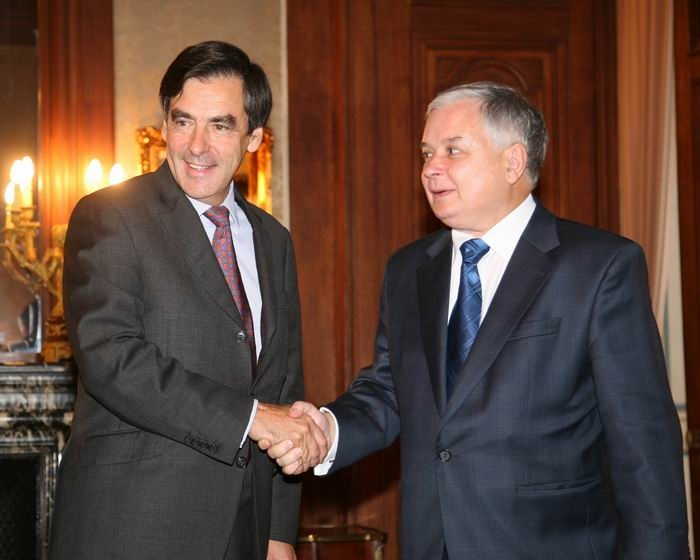
Fillon with Polish President Lech Kaczyński, October 2007

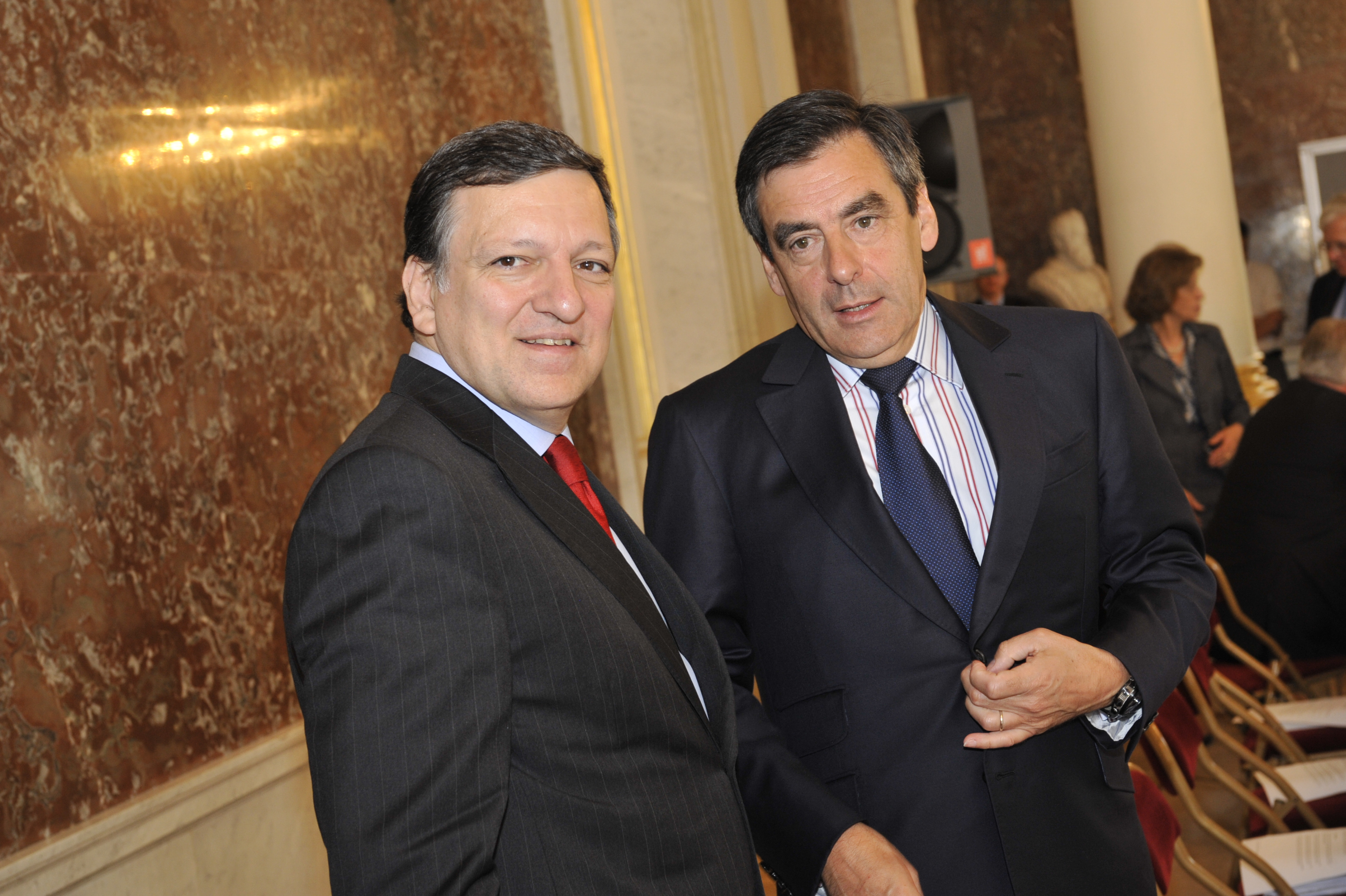
Fillon with President of the European Commission José Manuel Barroso, June 2009

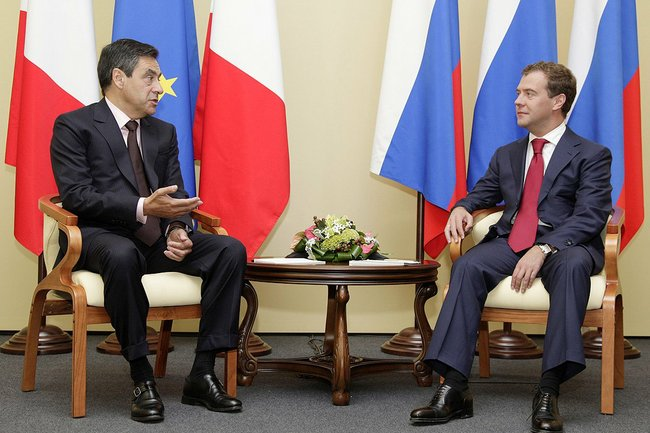
Fillon with Russian President Dmitry Medvedev, September 2009

Fillon is an advocate of cracking down on Salafism and Muslim Brotherhood-linked groups and has stridently warned against the threat of "Islamic totalitarianism". He has called for dialogue with Syria under Bashar al-Assad, as well as with the Russian Federation under Vladimir Putin. Putin has been described as a friend of Fillon, although Fillon himself rejects that description.

== Personal life ==
Fillon lives with his wife, Penelope, and five children, Marie, Charles, Antoine, Édouard and Arnaud, in the 12th-century Manoir de Beaucé, set in 20 acres (8 ha) of woodland on the banks of the River Sarthe 4 km east of the monastery village of Solesmes, near Sablé-sur-Sarthe, and about halfway between Le Mans and Angers. They had lived in various other properties, always in the Sarthe, throughout their marriage, before buying Beaucé in 1993.

Fillon is an Anglophile. His wife Penelope Kathryn Fillon, née Clarke, was born in Llanover in Wales, the daughter of a solicitor. They met while she was teaching English during her gap year in Le Mans, and they were married in the bride's family church in June 1980.

Fillon has spoken at a wide variety of universities in Britain, notably King's College London and the London School of Economics. On 1 September 2017, Fillon became a partner at asset manager Tikehau Capital. Fillon's younger brother, Pierre, an ophthalmic specialist (and now President of the Automobile Club de l'Ouest), later married Penelope Fillon's younger sister, Jane.

== Conviction for fraud ==
In January 2017, Le Canard enchaîné published an article in which Penelope Fillon was accused of alleged fictitious employment, as her husband's "assistante parlementaire" for a total salary of €500,000 over eight years on the one hand, and as a "literary adviser" of Revue des deux Mondes on the other, with a monthly salary of €5,000, amounting to a total of another €100,000. A preliminary hearing immediately opened. The public outcry around this so-called "Penelopegate" was such that doubts were voiced about François Fillon himself, who was the frontrunner for the 2017 presidential election, with an immediate sharp decline in the opinion polls.

On 31 January, new reporting by Le Canard enchaîné found that Penelope Fillon was actually paid €300,000 more than previously reported, for a total sum of €831,440 for 15 years of her parliamentary assistant work. It also reported that Fillon had paid two of his children €84,000 for little apparent actual work. On 6 February 2017 Fillon held a press conference. He said "It was a mistake and I apologize to the French [people]" but also said that the salary of his wife was "perfectly justified".

On 3 March 2017, the OCLCIFF (Central office for the fight against corruption and financial and fiscal crime) executed a search at the Manoir de Beaucé where François and Penelope Fillon reside in the Sarthe department. This followed a search by the same agency on 2 March 2017 at the Fillons' Paris residence in the 7th arrondissement. On 6 March 2017, the inner circle of Fillon's party had a crisis meeting. Beforehand, Alain Juppé had definitively excluded becoming a replacement candidate. Fillon continues his candidacy, despite his promise (given on 26 January on TV) to withdraw from the race if subjected to criminal prosecution. On 23 March, Fillon said on national television that Bienvenue Place Beauvau, a book co-authored by Didier Hassoux of Le Canard enchaîné, suggested President Hollande ran a shadow cabinet to spread rumours about his opponents. Hassoux denied this was the case.

On 24 February 2020, Fillon became one of the few prime ministers to ever go on trial. On 29 June 2020, he was convicted of fraud and misuse of funds, and sentenced to five years in prison, three of them suspended. Their lawyers appealed against the sentence and he remains free pending the outcome of the appeal. On 9 May 2022, a French appeals court reduced Fillon's prison sentence shortened to four years with three years suspended. His wife Penelope was given a suspended two-year prison sentence for the embezzlement charge, down from three years suspended. The court maintained fines of €375,000 for each of them. The sentence was overruled by the Court of Cassation, which ordered a new sentencing trial. On 17 June 2025, Fillon was given a suspended four-year prison term.

== 2F Conseil affair ==
In its 22 March 2017 issue, satirical weekly Le Canard enchaîné reported that Fillon had introduced a Lebanese billionaire to Russian President Vladimir Putin at a business forum in St. Petersburg in 2015 as part of a $50,000 contract for Fillon's 2F Conseil consulting firm.

== Le Mans race ==
Having lived his whole life in the Le Mans area and having represented it politically, Fillon is an enthusiastic supporter of the 24 Hour of Le Mans sportscar race, which he has attended nearly every year since he was a small child. He is a member of the Automobile Club de l'Ouest, which stages the event, and is on the race's organisation committee. He has also competed in the Le Mans Legend historic sportscar races on the full 24-hour circuit and in a number of other classic road rallies. Fillon's younger brother Pierre currently serves as the President of the ACO, having been elected in 2013.

== Awards and honours ==
- France:
  - Commander of the Order of Academic Palms (2004)
  - Grand Cross of the National Order of Merit (21 November 2007 – Automatic six months after taking office)
  - Grand Officer of the Order of Legion of Honour (2012)
- Japan:
  - Grand Cordon of the Order of the Paulownia Flowers
  - Grand Cordon of the Order of the Rising Sun (9 May 2013)

== See also ==
- Robert Bourgi

Political offices
Preceded by Michel d'Aillières	President of the General Council of Sarthe; 1992–1998	Succeeded by Roland du Luart
Preceded by Hubert Curien as Minister of Research	Minister of Higher Education and Research; 1993–1995	Succeeded by François Bayrou
Preceded by José Rossi	Minister of Information Technologies and Posts; 1995	Succeeded by Franck Borotra
New office	Minister responsible for Posts, Telecommunications and Space; 1995–1997	Succeeded by Christian Pierret
Preceded by Olivier Guichard	President of the Regional Council of Pays de la Loire; 1998–2002	Succeeded by Jean-Luc Harousseau
Preceded by Élisabeth Guigou	Minister of Social Affairs, Labour and Solidarity; 2002–2004	Succeeded by Jean-Louis Borloo
Preceded by Luc Ferry as Minister of National Education and Research	Minister of National Education, Higher Education and Research; 2004–2005	Succeeded by Gilles de Robien
Preceded by François Loos as Minister of Higher Education	Minister of National Education, Higher Education and Research; 2004–2005	Succeeded by Gilles de Robien
Preceded by Nathalie Kosciusko-Morizet	Minister of Ecology, Sustainable Development, Transport and Housing; 2012	Succeeded by Nicole Bricq
Preceded by Dominique de Villepin	Prime Minister of France; 2007–2012	Succeeded by Jean-Marc Ayrault
Order of precedence
Preceded by Dominique de Villepin as Former Prime Minister	Order of precedence of France; Former Prime Minister	Succeeded by Jean-Marc Ayrault as Former Prime Minister
