= Raoul Cabrol =

French caricaturist

Raoul Cabrol (1895–1956) was a French caricaturist.
