= Henri-Paul Deyvaux-Gassier =

French caricaturist and illustrator

Henri-Paul Deyvaux-Gassier (1883–1951) was a French caricaturist and illustrator.
