= Bruno Joncour =

French politician (born 1953)

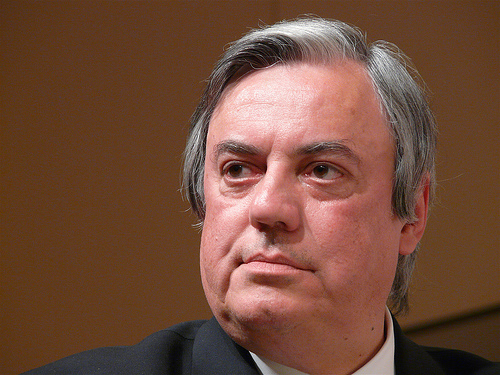

Member of the National Assembly for Côtes-d'Armor's 1st constituency
- In office 21 June 2017 – 22 June 2022
- Preceded by: Michel Lesage
- Succeeded by: Mickaël Cosson

Mayor of Saint-Brieuc
- In office 2001–2017
- Preceded by: Claude Saunier
- Succeeded by: Marie-Claire Diouron

Personal details
- Born: 25 November 1953 (age 71); Bizerte, Tunisia
- Political party: MoDem

Bruno Joncour (born 25 November 1953) is a French politician, Mayor of Saint-Brieuc and a member of the MoDem.

In the 2001 local elections, as the candidate of the right in Saint-Brieuc (Côtes-d'Armor), he was elected Mayor with 52% of the vote in the runoff, ending 39 years of Socialist rule. He was a member of the Union for French Democracy (UDF) and was one of the few members of the UDF not to join the new Union for a Popular Movement (UMP) in 2002.

He was the UDF's top candidate in 2004 Brittany regional election, winning 11.06% of the vote in the first round before merging with the UMP list led by Josselin de Rohan. Although the UMP-UDF list was defeated in a landslide in the runoff, Joncour was elected to the Regional Council of Brittany.

In 2007 he joined François Bayrou's MoDem.

Although his election in 2001 was deemed to be an 'accident', he was re-elected in the 2008 local elections with the support of the right against Socialist MP Danielle Bousquet. He won 44.71% in the first round (against 40.12% for Bousquet) and was re-elected with 54.28% of the votes in the runoff.

As the MoDem candidate in the 2008 Senate elections, he won 23.61% of the votes in the Côtes-d'Armor electoral college and was not elected. He was the second candidate behind Sylvie Goulard in the West constituency in the 2009 European election, but he was not elected to the European Parliament.

In 2009, he was selected to be the MoDem's candidate in Brittany for the 2010 regional elections.
