= List of senators of Côtes-d'Armor =

Location of Côtes-d'Armor in France

Following is a list of senators of Côtes-d'Armor, people who have represented the department of Côtes-d'Armor in the Senate of France. The department was formerly named Côtes-du-Nord, and became Côtes-d'Armor on 27 February 1990,

== Third Republic ==
Senators for Côtes-du-Nord under the French Third Republic were:

- Jean-Marie Allenou (1876–1880)
- Jules de Monjaret de Kerjegu (1876–1880)
- Henri de Champagny (1876–1885)
- Henri de Treveneuc (1876–1893)
- Silvain Duval (1880–1883)
- Henri de Carné (1880–1912)
- Auguste Le Provost de Launay (1885–1886)
- Tristan de L'Angle Beaumanoir (1885–1895)
- Charles Huon de Penanster (1886–1901)
- Auguste Ollivier (1889–1912)
- Charles Haugoumar des Portes (1893–1911)
- Louis Le Provost de Launay (1896–1912)
- Robert de Treveneuc (1921–1931)
- Guillaume Limon (1912–1920)
- Hervé de Keranflec'h (1912–1921)
- Frédéric de Kerouartz (1912–1921)
- Louis Larère (1912–1921)
- Paul Le Troadec (1920–1930)
- Charles Baudet (1921–1930)
- Henri Servain (1921–1931)
- Gustave de Kerguezec (1921–1939)
- Eugène Mando (1921–1939)
- Yves Le Trocquer (1930–1938)
- Pierre Even (1930–1941)
- Charles Meunier-Surcouf (1931–1939)
- Pierre Betfert (1938–1945)
- Edgar de Kergariou (1939–1941)
- Yves Bouguen (1939–1945)
- Pierre Michel (1939–1945)

== Fourth Republic ==
Senators for Côtes-du-Nord under the French Fourth Republic were:

- Yves Henry (1946–1948)
- Auguste Le Coënt (1946–1948)
- Ferdinand Siabas (1948–1959)
- Henri Cordier (1948–1959)
- André Cornu (1948–1959)
- Yves Jézequel (1948–1959)

== Fifth Republic ==
Senators for Côtes-du-Nord and then Côtes-d'Armor under the French Fifth Republic:

- André Cornu (1959–1971)
- Jean de Bagneux (1959–1980)
- Yves Le Cozannet (1980–1989)
- Bernard Lemarié (1959–1989)
- Pierre Marzin (1971–1980)
- René Régnault (1980–1998)
- Félix Leyzour (1989–1997)
- Claude Saunier (1989–2008)
- Jean Dérian (1997–1998)
- Pierre-Yvon Trémel (1998–2006)
- Gérard Le Cam (1998–2014)
- Claude Saunier (1989–2008)
- Charles Josselin (2006–2008)
- Jacqueline Chevé (2008–2010)
- Yannick Botrel (from 2008)
- Ronan Kerdraon (2010–2014)
- Christine Prunaud (from 2014)
- Michel Vaspart (from 2014)

== Sources ==
- Liste des anciens sénateurs de la IIIème République par circonscription (in French), Sénat de France
- Liste des anciens sénateurs de la IVème République par circonscription (in French), Sénat de France
- Liste des anciens sénateurs de la Vème République par circonscription (in French), Sénat de France
- Liste par département – Côtes-d'Armor (in French), Sénat de France
