= 2004 Brittany regional election =

Regional election in France

- 21–28 March 2004
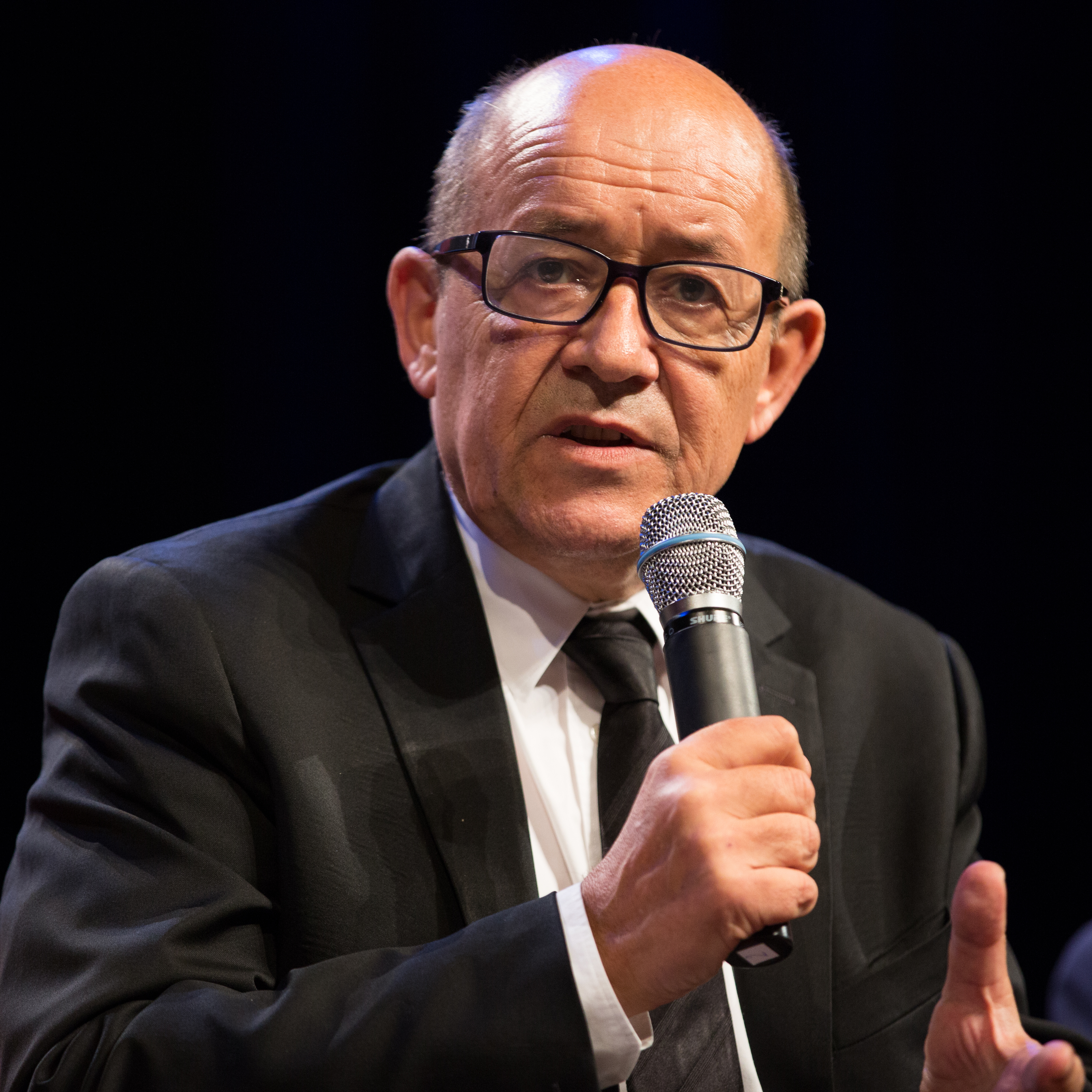

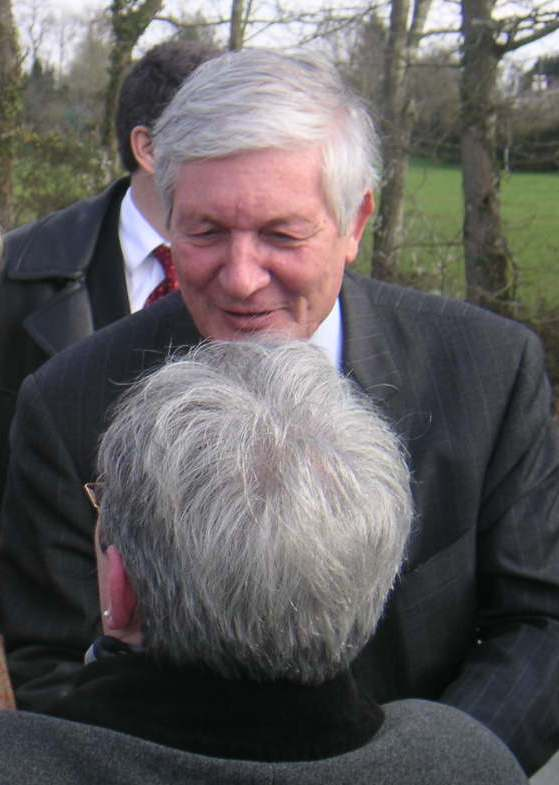

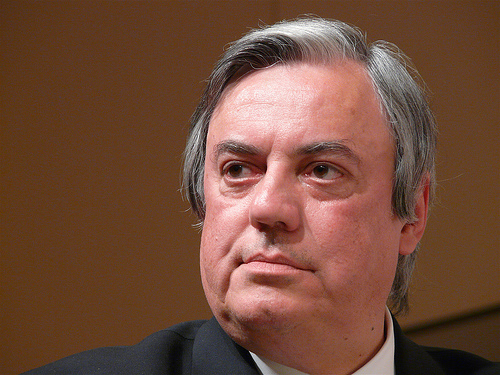
| | Majority party | Minority party | Third party |
|---|---|---|---|
| Leader | Jean-Yves Le Drian | Josselin de Rohan | Bruno Joncour |
| Party | PS | UMP | UDF |
| Alliance | PS-PCF-PRG |
| | Fourth party |
| Leader | Pascale Loget |
| Party | Les Verts |
| Alliance | Les Verts-UDB |
President before election
Josselin de Rohan
UMP
Elected President
Jean-Yves Le Drian
PS

A regional election took place in Brittany on 21 March and 28 March 2004, along with all other regions. Jean-Yves Le Drian (PS) was elected president, defeating incumbent Josselin de Rohan (UMP).

== Results ==
=== Regional ===
Results of regional elections on 21–28 March 2004 in Brittany
| Leader Party (alliance members) | First round | | Second round | | Seats | |
| Leader Party (alliance members) | Votes | % | Votes | % | # | % |
|---|---|---|---|---|---|---|
| Jean-Yves Le Drian; Socialist Party (PCF - PRG) | 521,823 | 38.47 | 840,989 | 58.78 | 58 | 69.90 |
| Pascale Loget; The Greens (UDB) | 131,550 | 9.70 | 840,989 | 58.78 | 58 | 69.90 |
| Josselin de Rohan; Union for a Popular Movement | 347,134 | 25.59 | 589,637 | 41.22 | 25 | 30.10 |
| Bruno Joncour; Union for French Democracy | 150,078 | 11.06 | 589,637 | 41.22 | 25 | 30.10 |
| Brigitte Neveux; National Front | 114,926 | 8.47 | | | | |
| Françoise Dubu; Revolutionary Communist League (LO) | 64,868 | 4.78 | | | | |
| Lionel David; National Republican Movement | 26,074 | 1.92 | | | | |
| Registered voters | 2,207,064 | 100 | 2,206,047 | 100 | | |
| Abstentions | 785,758 | 35.60 | 708,830 | 32.13 | | |
| Voters | 1 421 306 | 64.40 | 1,497,217 | 67.87 | | |
| White and rejected ballots | 64.853 | 4.56 | 66.591 | 4.45 | | |
| Valid votes | 1.356,453 | 95.44 | 1,430,626 | 95.55 | | |

=== By department ===
==== Côtes-d'Armor ====
Results of regional elections on 21–28 March 2004 in Côtes-d'Armor
| Leader | List | First round | | Second round | | Seats | |
| Leader | List | Votes | % | Votes | % | # | % |
|---|---|---|---|---|---|---|---|
| Michel Morin | PS-PCF-PRG | 111,311 | 40.50 | 181,591 | 62.20 | 13 | 72.22 |
| Michel Balbot | The Greens-UDB | 26,810 | 9.78 | 181,591 | 62.20 | 13 | 72.22 |
| Mireille Dubois | UMP | 53,036 | 19.30 | 110,346 | 37.80 | 5 | 27.88 |
| Bruno Joncour | UDF | 41,409 | 15.07 | 110,346 | 37.80 | 5 | 27.88 |
| Pierre-Marie Launay | FN | 23,561 | 8.57 | | | | |
| Martial Collet | LCR-LO | 13,796 | 5.02 | | | | |
| Monique Robert | MNR | 4,820 | 1.75 | | | | |
| Registered voters | | 432,154 | 100 | 431,814 | 100 | | |
| Voters | | 288,425 | 66.74 | 306,272 | 70.93 | | |
| Valid votes | | 274,823 | 95.28 | 291,937 | 95.32 | | |

==== Finistère ====
Results of regional elections on 21–28 March 2004 in Finistère
| Leader | List | First round | | Second round | | Seats | |
| Leader | List | Votes | % | Votes | % | # | % |
|---|---|---|---|---|---|---|---|
| Marylise Lebranchu | PS-PCF-PRG | 158,932 | 40.24 | 247,607 | 59.25 | 17 | 70.83 |
| Janick Moriceau | The Greens-UDB | 38,195 | 9.67 | 247,607 | 59.25 | 17 | 70.83 |
| Hélène Tanguy | UMP | 100,137 | 25.35 | 170,291 | 40.75 | 7 | 29.17 |
| Louis Caradec | UDF | 44,264 | 11.21 | 170,291 | 40.75 | 7 | 29.17 |
| Marianne Haas | FN | 28,813 | 7.29 | | | | |
| Arnaud Hell | LCR-LO | 17,473 | 4.42 | | | | |
| Antoine Guillemot | MNR | 7,180 | 1.82 | | | | |
| Registered voters | | 640,684 | 100 | 640,587 | 100 | | |
| Voters | | 409,677 | 63.94 | 433,233 | 67.63 | | |
| Valid votes | | 394,994 | 96.42 | 417,898 | 96.46 | | |

==== Ille-et-Vilaine ====
Results of regional elections on 21–28 March 2004 in Ille-et-Vilaine
| Leader | List | First round | | Second round | | Seats | |
| Leader | List | Votes | % | Votes | % | # | % |
|---|---|---|---|---|---|---|---|
| Sylvie Robert | PS-PCF-PRG | 137,225 | 36.64 | 231,123 | 58.59 | 16 | 66.67 |
| Pascale Loget | The Greens-UDB | 39,459 | 10.54 | 231,123 | 58.59 | 16 | 66.67 |
| Marie-Thérèse Boisseau | UMP | 98,508 | 26.30 | 163,336 | 41.41 | 7 | 33.33 |
| Bernard Marboeuf | UDF | 39,774 | 10.62 | 163,336 | 41.41 | 7 | 33.33 |
| Brigitte Neveux | FN | 31,031 | 8.28 | | | | |
| Raymond Madec | LCR-LO | 20,372 | 5.44 | | | | |
| Lionel David | MNR | 8,157 | 2.18 | | | | |
| Registered voters | | 625,879 | 100 | 625,256 | 100 | | |
| Voters | | 395,664 | 63.22 | 414,406 | 66.28 | | |
| Valid votes | | 374,526 | 59.84 | 394,459 | 95.19 | | |

==== Morbihan ====
Results of regional elections on 21–28 March 2004 in Morbihan
| Leader | List | First round | | Second round | | Seats | |
| Leader | List | Votes | % | Votes | % | # | % |
|---|---|---|---|---|---|---|---|
| Jean-Yves Le Drian | PS-PCF-PRG | 114,355 | 36.64 | 180,668 | 55.36 | 12 | 66.67 |
| Christian Guyonvarc'h | The Greens-UDB | 27,026 | 8.66 | 180,668 | 55.36 | 12 | 66.67 |
| Josselin de Rohan | UMP | 95,453 | 30.58 | 145,664 | 44.64 | 6 | 33.33 |
| Fabrice Loher | UDF | 24,611 | 7.89 | 145,664 | 44.64 | 6 | 33.33 |
| Jean-Paul-William Félix | FN | 31,521 | 10.10 | | | | |
| François Caharel | LCR-LO | 13,227 | 4.24 | | | | |
| Claude Lemeunier | MNR | 5,917 | 1.90 | | | | |
| Registered voters | | 508,347 | 100 | 508,390 | 100 | | |
| Voters | | 327,540 | 64.43 | 343,306 | 67.53 | | |
| Valid votes | | 312,110 | 95.29 | 326,332 | 95.06 | | |
