= Jean-Marie Allenou =

French politician (1818–1880)

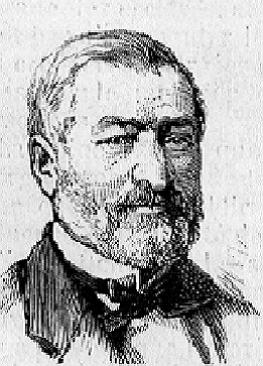

Representative of Côtes-du-Nord
- In office 8 February 1871 – 7 March 1876

Senator of Côtes-du-Nord
- In office 30 January 1876 – 20 July 1880

Personal details
- Born: 22 April 1818 Quintin, Côtes-du-Nord, France
- Died: 20 July 1880 (aged 62) Biarritz, Pyrénées-Atlantiques, France
- Occupation: ironmaster and politician

Jean-Marie Allenou (22 April 1818 – 20 July 1880) was a French ironmaster and conservative politician. He was deputy of Côtes-du-Nord, in Brittany, from 1871 to 1876, then Senator of Côtes-du-Nord from 1876 until his death in 1880.

== Early years ==
Jean-Marie Allenou was born on 22 April 1818 in Quintin, Côtes-du-Nord. His parents were Jean-Marie Allenou (1783–1855) and Anne-Marie Veillet-Dufrêche (1793–1859). He married Marie Le Gue. His son Victor Allenou, born in the chateau de Lorges in 1850, was mayor of l'Hermitage-Lorge in the 1880s. His daughter, Marie, was born in 1852 and married Paul de Foucaud de Launay in 1872.

Allenou was an ironmaster in Le Pas, co-owner of the forest and chateau of Lorges, mayor of l'Hermitage-Lorges. He was a member of the Breton Association from 1853, of the Celtic Congress at Saint-Brieuc in 1867, and of the Societé d'Emulation of Côtes-du-Nord.

== Deputy ==
Allenou ran for election to the National Assembly for Côtes-du-Nord as a Conservative on 8 February 1871, and was elected 8th out of 13 with 69,121 votes out of 106,809. He did not join any parliamentary group at first. Later, he joined the Orléanist parliamentary group, Centre droit. On 8 October 1871 he was appointed general councilor of Côtes-du-Nord for the canton of Uzel. He voted for conclusion of peace with Prussia. for public prayers, for abrogation of the laws of exile of the princes of Orleans, for the constituent power of the Assembly, for the proposal of Jean-Charles Rivet^{(fr)} instituting the presidency of the Republic and against the return of the Chamber from Versailles to Paris.

Allenou did not oppose he policy of President Adolphe Thiers before 24 May 1873, but after the fall of Thiers he became closer to the right and associated himself with the ministry of Albert de Broglie. He voted for the Constitution of 25 February 1875, despite having previously rejected the proposals of Jean Casimir-Perier and Léon de Maleville, and Henri-Alexandre Wallon's amendment. As a Catholic on 12 July 1875 he voted for the bill on the "freedom of higher education".

== Senator ==
Allenou was elected Senator of Côtes-du-Nord on 20 January 1876 with three royalists, Jules de Monjaret de Kerjégu^{(fr)}, Henri de Treveneuc^{(fr)} and Henri de Champagny^{(fr)}. In his profession of faith Allenou pledged to promote the application of the Constitution "until 1880". He added: "A convinced Catholic, I want freedom of conscience for all, but protection and freedom also for the religion of our fathers, which has contributed so much to make France great in past centuries." He sat on the right in the Senate and voted consistently with the Conservatives. In June 1877 he came out in favour of the dissolution of the Chamber demanded by the 16 May 1877 government. In 1880 he voted against Article 7, and against the various bills of Jules Ferry on public instruction.

Jean-Marie Allenou died in office on 20 July 1880 in Biarritz, Pyrénées-Atlantiques.

== Sources ==
- Jean-Marie Allenou (in French), Assemblée nationale
- Pierfit, Jean-Marie ALLENOU (in French)
- Pocard du Cosquer de Kerviler, René (1886), Répertoire général de bio-bibliographie bretonne (in French), J. Plihon et L. Hervé
- Robert, Adolphe; Cougny, Gaston (1889–1891), "Allenou, Jean-Marie", Dictionnaire des parlementaires français... : depuis le 1er mai 1789 jusqu'au 1er mai 1889 (in French), Paris: Edgar Bourloton
