= Neveux =

Neveux is a French surname. Notable people with the surname include:

- Brigitte Neveux, French politician and member of the far-right National Front
- Georges Neveux (1900–1982), French dramatist and poet
