= Politics of Brittany =

The politics of Brittany, France takes place in a framework of a presidential representative democracy, whereby the President of Regional Council is the head of government, and of a pluriform multi-party system. Legislative power is vested in the regional council.

== Executive ==
The executive of the region is led by the President of the regional council.

=== List of presidents ===
Presidents of Brittany
President	Party	Term
René Pleven	DC	1974–1976
André Colin	CDS	1976–1978
Raymond Marcellin	UDF-PR	1978–1986
Yvon Bourges	RPR	1986–1998
Josselin de Rohan	RPR/UMP	1998–2004
Jean-Yves Le Drian	PS	2004–

== Legislative branch ==
The Regional Council of Brittany (Conseil régional de Bretagne, Kuzul Rannvroel Breizh) is composed of 83 councillors, elected by proportional representation in a two-round system. The winning list in the second round is automatically entitled to a quarter of the seats. The remainder of the seats are allocated through proportional representation with a 5% threshold.

The council is elected for a six-year term.

=== Current composition ===
Party		seats
•	Socialist Party	28
	Republican	14
	Ensemble !	9
	National Rally	8
•	French Communist Party	4
	The Ecologists	6
	Breton Democratic Union	6
•	Regionalists	3
•	Miscellaneous Ecologists	5

== Elections ==
=== Other elections ===
Presidential runoff elections results
Year	National winner	Runner-up
2007	47.38% 921,256	52.62% 1,023,056
2002	88.56% 1,523,388	11.44% 196,712
1995	50.44% 858,100	49.56% 843,169
1988	55.10% 929,363	44.90% 757,417
1981	48.95% 796,769	51.05% 831,034
1974	56.54% 781,563	43.46% 600,678
1969	63.95% 692,280	36.05% 390,240
1965	63.15% 806,958	36.85% 470,839

In the 2007 legislative election, 13 Socialists were elected. The UMP won 11 seats. One centrist affiliated with the MoDem (now New Centre) was elected. One PS dissident, Marcel Rogemont was also elected.

== Political movements ==
The reunification of Brittany is supported by 50% of the inhabitants of Brittany and of Loire-Atlantique compared to 28% who are opposed, and is considered a prerequisite to further autonomy.
