= Plœuc-l'Hermitage =

- Commune
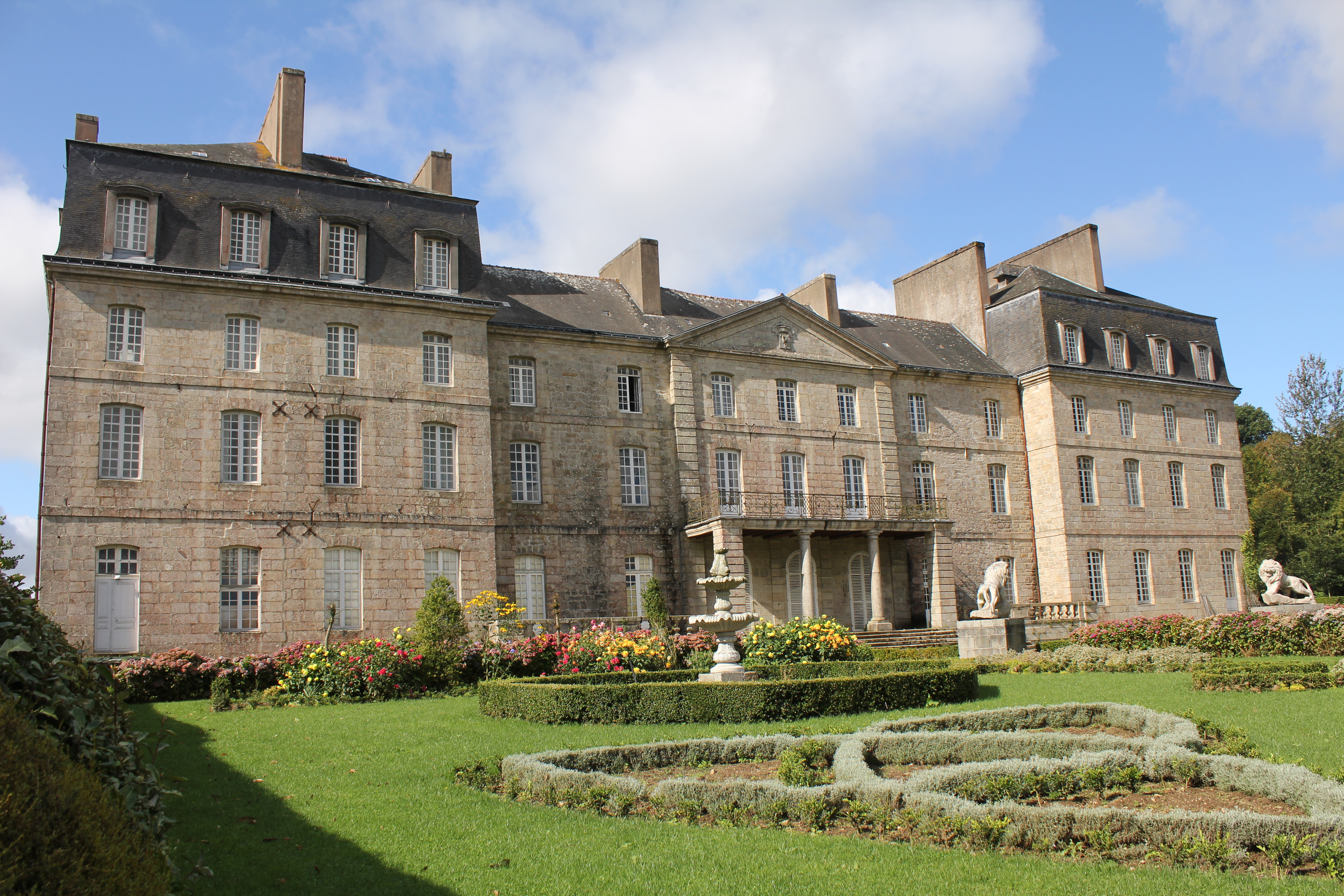
- The château of Lorges
- Location of Plœuc-l'Hermitage
- Location within France Location within Brittany
- Coordinates: 48°20′49″N 2°45′22″W
- Country: France
- Region: Brittany
- Department: Côtes-d'Armor
- Arrondissement: Saint-Brieuc
- Canton: Plaintel
- Intercommunality: Saint-Brieuc Armor

Government
  - Mayor (2020–2026): Thibaut Guignard
- Area^{1}: 82.27 km^{2} (31.76 sq mi)
- Population (2023): 4,103
  - Density: 49.87/km^{2} (129.2/sq mi)
- Time zone: UTC+01:00 (CET)
  - Summer (DST): UTC+02:00 (CEST)
- INSEE/Postal code: 22203 /22150
- ^{1} French Land Register data, which excludes lakes, ponds, glaciers > 1 km^{2} (0.386 sq mi or 247 acres) and river estuaries.

Plœuc-l'Hermitage (French pronunciation: [plœk lɛʁmitaʒ]; Breton: Ploheg-Peniti) is a commune in the Côtes-d'Armor department of western France. The municipality was established on 1 January 2016 and consists of the former communes of Plœuc-sur-Lié and L'Hermitage-Lorge.

== Geography ==
=== Climate ===
Plœuc-l'Hermitage has an oceanic climate (Köppen climate classification Cfb). The average annual temperature in Plœuc-l'Hermitage is 10.8 °C (51.4 °F). The average annual rainfall is 929.8 mm (36.61 in) with December as the wettest month. The temperatures are highest on average in August, at around 17.3 °C (63.1 °F), and lowest in January, at around 5.0 °C (41.0 °F). The highest temperature ever recorded in Plœuc-l'Hermitage was 38.5 °C (101.3 °F) on 9 August 2003; the coldest temperature ever recorded was −13.0 °C (8.6 °F) on 2 January 1997.

Climate data for Plœuc-sur-Lié, Plœuc-l'Hermitage (1981–2010 averages, extremes 1986−2020)
Month	Jan	Feb	Mar	Apr	May	Jun	Jul	Aug	Sep	Oct	Nov	Dec	Year
Record high °C (°F)	16.0 (60.8)	21.4 (70.5)	22.5 (72.5)	27.8 (82.0)	29.5 (85.1)	34.3 (93.7)	36.8 (98.2)	38.5 (101.3)	31.0 (87.8)	28.2 (82.8)	20.4 (68.7)	16.1 (61.0)	38.5 (101.3)
Mean daily maximum °C (°F)	7.8 (46.0)	9.1 (48.4)	11.8 (53.2)	13.8 (56.8)	17.5 (63.5)	20.3 (68.5)	22.3 (72.1)	22.7 (72.9)	19.7 (67.5)	15.6 (60.1)	11.2 (52.2)	8.3 (46.9)	15.0 (59.0)
Daily mean °C (°F)	5.0 (41.0)	5.7 (42.3)	7.6 (45.7)	9.2 (48.6)	12.6 (54.7)	15.1 (59.2)	17.1 (62.8)	17.3 (63.1)	14.7 (58.5)	11.7 (53.1)	7.9 (46.2)	5.4 (41.7)	10.8 (51.4)
Mean daily minimum °C (°F)	2.2 (36.0)	2.4 (36.3)	3.4 (38.1)	4.5 (40.1)	7.6 (45.7)	9.9 (49.8)	12.0 (53.6)	11.8 (53.2)	9.6 (49.3)	7.8 (46.0)	4.6 (40.3)	2.5 (36.5)	6.5 (43.7)
Record low °C (°F)	−13.0 (8.6)	−9.5 (14.9)	−10.0 (14.0)	−5.5 (22.1)	−2.5 (27.5)	−0.5 (31.1)	3.8 (38.8)	1.5 (34.7)	−1.0 (30.2)	−7.0 (19.4)	−6.0 (21.2)	−10.5 (13.1)	−13.0 (8.6)
Average precipitation mm (inches)	102.2 (4.02)	87.6 (3.45)	64.7 (2.55)	73.2 (2.88)	64.4 (2.54)	55.8 (2.20)	50.8 (2.00)	50.1 (1.97)	73.4 (2.89)	97.0 (3.82)	104.9 (4.13)	105.7 (4.16)	929.8 (36.61)
Average precipitation days (≥ 1.0 mm)	14.2	12.8	12.0	12.5	9.8	8.1	8.2	7.9	9.1	13.6	14.8	14.5	137.5
Source: Meteociel

== Population ==
Population data refer to the commune in its geography as of January 2025.

Historical population
Year	Pop.	±% p.a.
1968	3,623	—
1975	3,550	−0.29%
1982	3,640	+0.36%
1990	3,562	−0.27%
1999	3,589	+0.08%
2007	3,940	+1.17%
2012	4,046	+0.53%
2017	4,062	+0.08%
2023	4,103	+0.17%
Source: INSEE

== See also ==
- Communes of the Côtes-d'Armor department
