= Brigitte Neveux =

French politician

Brigitte Neveux is a French politician.

In the 2004 regional elections, she led the FN list in Brittany and obtained 8.47% of the votes in the first round, below the 10% threshold for a place in the runoff. Therefore, no members of the FN were elected to the Regional Council of Brittany.

In 2009, the FN selected Neveux to head the FN list in the West France constituency for the 2009 European elections. Her list gained 3.06% of the vote, not enough to elect a member to the European Parliament.

In 2009, she was selected to be the National Front's top candidate in the Pays de la Loire region for the 2010 regional elections.

In the 2015 regional elections, she was on the list in the Pays de la Loire region for the National Front and elected.

In the 2022 legislative election, Neveux ran as a candidate for Éric Zemmour's Reconquête party in Vendée's 2nd legislative constituency. She finished seventh.
