= Côtes-d'Armor's 1st constituency =

Constituency of the National Assembly of France

1st constituency of the Côtes-d'Armor
- inline Constituency of the National Assembly of France

- Constituency in department

- Côtes-d'Armor in France
- Deputy: Mickaël Cosson; MoDem
- Department: Côtes-d'Armor
- Cantons: Châtelaudren, Langueux, Plérin, Ploufragan, Saint-Brieuc Nord, Saint-Brieuc Ouest, Saint-Brieuc Sud.

The 1st constituency of the Côtes-d'Armor is a French legislative constituency in the Côtes-d'Armor département in Brittany. Like the other 576 French constituencies, it elects one MP using the two-round system, with a run-off if no candidate receives over 50% of the vote in the first round.

== Geography ==
The constituency is anchored by the town of Saint-Brieuc.

== Deputies ==
Election	Member	Party
1958	Victor Rault	MRP
1962	Robert Richet	UNR
1967	Yves Le Foll	PSU
1968	Arthur Charles	Non-affiliated
1973	Yves Le Foll	PSU
1978	Sébastien Couépel	UDF
1981	Yves Dollo	PS
1986	Proportional representation - no election by constituency	
1988	Yves Dollo	PS
1993	Christian Daniel	RPR
1997	Danielle Bousquet	PS
2002	Danielle Bousquet	PS
2007	Danielle Bousquet	PS
2012	Michel Lesage	PS
2017	Bruno Joncour	MoDem
2022	Mickaël Cosson	MoDem
2024	Mickaël Cosson	MoDem

== Election results ==
=== 2024 ===
Candidate	Party	Alliance	First round			Second round		
Candidate	Party	Alliance	Votes	%	+/–	Votes	%	+/–
Mickaël Cosson	MoDEM	Ensemble	21,614	32.96	+8.15	27,186	41.45	-10.94
Marion Gordiard	LFI	NFP	19,926	30.38	+2.89	20,845	31.78	-15.83
Françoise Billaud	RN		16,888	25.75	+13.35	17,560	26.77	new
Barnard Croguennec	LR	UDC	3,635	5.54	new			
Aourell Danjou	ECO		1,806	2.75	new			
Alain Le Fol	LO		671	1.02	-0.04			
Virginie Mattasoglio	REG		522	0.84	new			
Hervé Denis	EXG		488	0.74	new			
Votes			65,580	100.00		65,591	100.00	
Valid votes			65,580	97.51	-0.18	65,591	97.16	+2.66
Blank votes			1,142	1.70	+0.07	1,404	2.08	-2.37
Null votes			535	0.80	+0.12	516	0.76	-1.29
Turnout			67,257	74.20	+21.15	67,511	74.48	+21.09
Abstentions			23,382	25.80	-21.15	23,131	25.52	+21.09
Registered voters			90,639			90,642		
Result			MoDEM HOLD					

=== 2022 ===
Legislative Election 2022: Côtes-d'Armor's 1st constituency
Party	Candidate	Votes	%	±%
LFI (NUPÉS)	Marion Gorgiard	13,092	27.49	-7.76
MoDem (Ensemble)	Mickaël Cosson	11,817	24.81	-16.39
RN	Françoise Billaud	5,904	12.40	+5.00
PS	Loïc Raoult*	4,689	9.84	N/A
HOR	Thierry Simeliere**	3,502	7.35	N/A
DVD	Stéphane Briend	3,047	6.40	N/A
REC	Pierre-Yves Thomas	1,215	2.55	N/A
DVC	Romain Faligot	1,197	2.51	N/A
Others	N/A	3,168	6.65	
Turnout		47,631	53.05	−2.12
2nd round result
MoDem (Ensemble)	Mickaël Cosson	24,043	52.39	-7.65
LFI (NUPÉS)	Marion Gorgiard	21,845	47.61	+7.65
Turnout		45,888	53.39	+7.00
MoDem hold				

* PS dissident
** Horizons dissident

=== 2017 ===
Candidate	Label	First round		Second round	
Candidate	Label	Votes	%	Votes	%
Bruno Joncour	MoDem	19,951	41.20	22,233	60.04
Michel Lesage	PS	6,691	13.82	14,795	39.96
Marion Gorgiard	FI	6,078	12.55		
Sylvie Grondin	LR	5,379	11.11		
Pierre-Yves Lopin	FN	3,582	7.40		
Aurélien Danvert	ECO	2,578	5.32		
Jean-François Philippe	PCF	1,725	3.56		
Pascal Laporte	REG	1,062	2.19		
Alain Le Fol	EXG	435	0.90		
Joannic Martin	REG	394	0.81		
Gwenaëlle Gesret	DIV	281	0.58		
Hervé Denis	EXG	265	0.55		
Guillaume Ropars	DIV	1	0.00		
Votes		48,422	100.00	37,028	100.00
Valid votes		48,422	97.71	37,028	88.87
Blank votes		790	1.59	3,034	7.28
Null votes		344	0.69	1,602	3.85
Turnout		49,556	55.17	41,664	46.39
Abstentions		40,261	44.83	48,151	53.61
Registered voters		89,817		89,815	

=== 2012 ===
2012 legislative election in Cotes-D'Armor's 1st constituency
Candidate	Party	First round		Second round	
Candidate	Party	Votes	%	Votes	%
Michel Lesage	PS	24,922	46.68%	33,417	65.86%
Sylvie Grondin	UMP	13,434	25.16%	17,321	34.14%
Jean-François Philippe	FG	5,043	9.45%		
Céline Lelaumier	FN	4,599	8.61%		
Thierry Stiefvater	UDB–EELV	3,024	5.66%		
Samuel Burlot	NPA	767	1.44%		
Yamina El Harouat	NC	647	1.21%		
Alain Le Fol	LO	444	0.83%		
Hervé Denis	POI	259	0.49%		
Julien Petit	SP	246	0.46%		
Valid votes		53,385	98.09%	50,738	96.20%
Spoilt and null votes		1,041	1.91%	2,005	3.80%
Votes cast / turnout		54,426	61.10%	52,743	59.24%
Abstentions		34,656	38.90%	36,290	40.76%
Registered voters		89,082	100.00%	89,033	100.00%

=== 2007 ===
Legislative Election 2007: Côtes-d'Armor's 1st constituency
Party	Candidate	Votes	%	±%
PS	Danielle Bousquet	22,133	39.86	
UMP	Alain Cadec	19,961	35.95	
PCF	Jean-Guy Le Bere	2,981	5.37	
LV	Marc Boivin	2,500	4.50	
LCR	Samuel Burlot	2,115	3.81	
DVD	Kingsley Okunmwendia	1,449	2.61	
FN	Jean-Claude Bourva	1,310	2.36	
MPF	Pierre-Yves Lopin	1,157	2.08	
Others	N/A	1,924	-	
Turnout		56,685	63.97	
2nd round result
PS	Danielle Bousquet	32,606	57.72	
UMP	Alain Cadec	23,880	42.28	
Turnout		57,919	65.46	
PS hold				

=== 2002 ===
Legislative Election 2002: Côtes-d'Armor's 1st constituency
Party	Candidate	Votes	%	±%
PS	Danielle Bousquet	19,519	34.98	
UMP	Mireille Dubois	14,126	25.32	
UDF	Yves Le Faucheur	7,235	12.97	
PCF	Janine Tardivel	4,244	7.61	
FN	Tiéphaine Marçais	2,910	5.22	
LV	André Ollivro	2,582	4.63	
LCR	Edouard Renard	1,270	2.28	
Others	N/A	3,908	-	
Turnout		56,811	67.78	
2nd round result
PS	Danielle Bousquet	29,804	55.02	
UMP	Mireille Dubois	24,369	44.98	
Turnout		56,014	66.84	
PS hold				

=== 1997 ===
Legislative Election 1997: Côtes-d'Armor's 1st constituency
Party	Candidate	Votes	%	±%
RPR	Christian Daniel	15,570	29.57	
PS	Danielle Bousquet	14,380	27.31	
PCF	Jean Derian	8,327	15.81	
FN	Raymond Blanc	4,214	8.00	
LV	Marc Boivin	1,820	3.46	
LO	Martial Collet	1,441	2.74	
GE	Patrice Audoux	1,373	2.61	
REG	Robert Pedron	1,161	2.20	
Others	N/A	4,372	-	
Turnout		55,250	68.25	
2nd round result
PS	Danielle Bousquet	33,069	57.79	
RPR	Christian Daniel	24,157	42.21	
Turnout		60,105	72.25	
PS gain from RPR				

== Sources ==
- Official results of French elections from 1998: "Résultats électoraux officiels en France" (in French). Archived from the original on 20 December 2011.
