= Hôtel de Courcy =

Hotel of Courcy
- Hôtel de Courcy
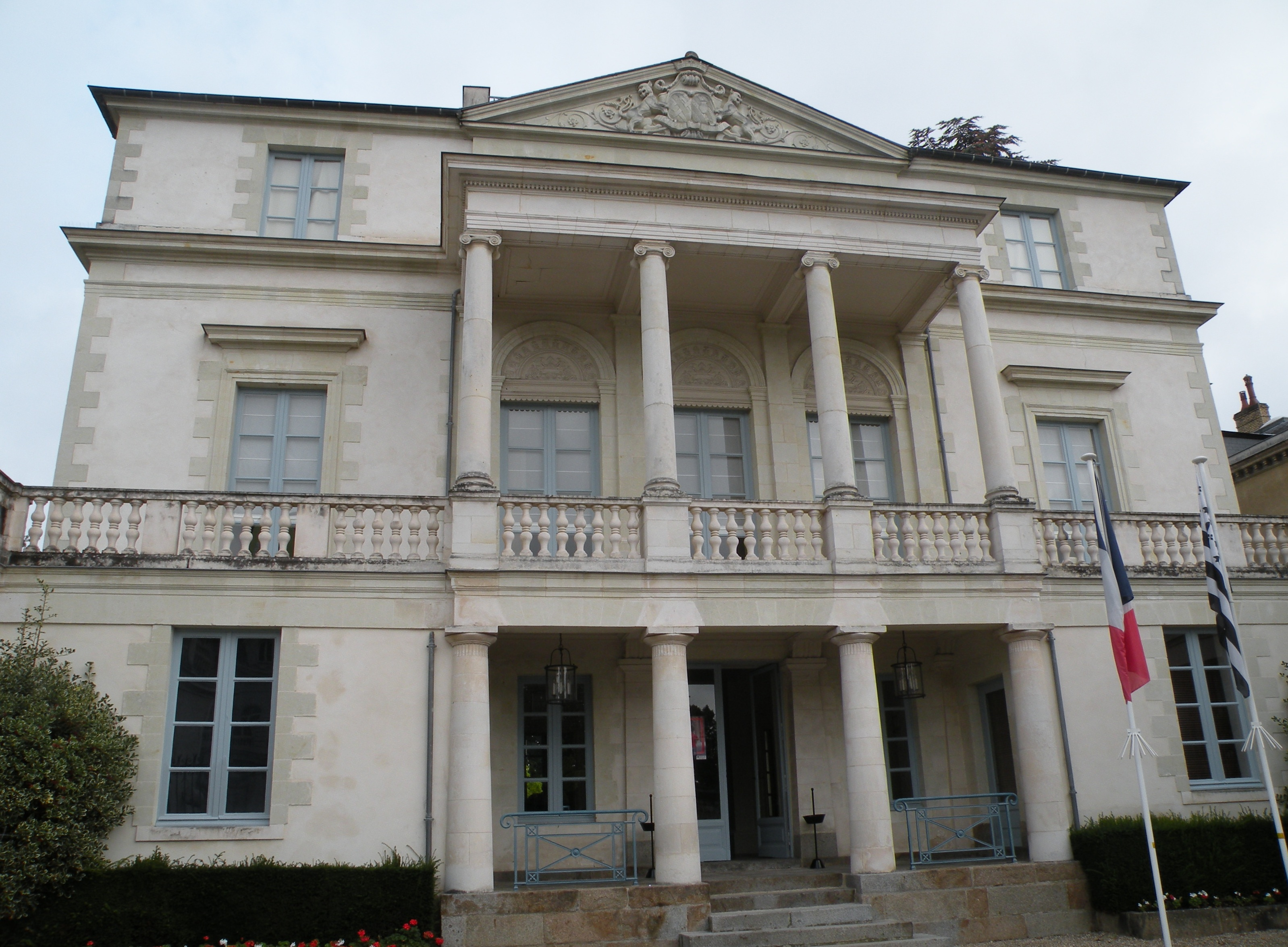
- Facade of the Hôtel de Courcy
- Interactive map of the Hotel of Courcy area
- Former names: Hôtel Richelot

General information
- Location: 9 rue Martenot, Rennes, France
- Coordinates: 48°06′46″N 1°40′24″W

Design and construction
- Architect: Louis Guy Richelot
- Designations: Monument historique

Hôtel de Courcy is a private mansion located in Rennes, 9 rue Martenot, opposite the La Motte square and near Parc du Thabor. Built in around 1830, it was the property of several families of Rennes before being transferred to the State during the 20^{th} century.

It has been partly listed as a Historic Monument since December 19, 1973 (facades and roofs; internal staircase with its cage; four rooms with plasterwork decoration).

== History ==
=== Construction and residence ===
First named Hôtel Richelot, it was built around 1830 by Louis Guy Richelot, then architect of the city. He built a neoclassical villa, inspired by Italian villas, at the foot of Parc du Thabor and its gardens. The hotel then overlooks the current rue de Paris, major axis of Rennes after the canalization of the Vilaine.

He held his office and his residence there until 1842, before handing over the property.u

In 1885, the La Goublaye de Nantois family bought the hotel and undertook major renovations there. From 1886, work was undertaken: transformation of the outbuildings into wings, interior decoration by the Jobbé-Duval and Odorico workshops. These craftsmen incorporated decorations more popular at the time, with a bottle-green stairwell, colorful friezes and ceilings, and gilding on the moldings. There are also mosaics by Isidore Odorico.

Interior decors

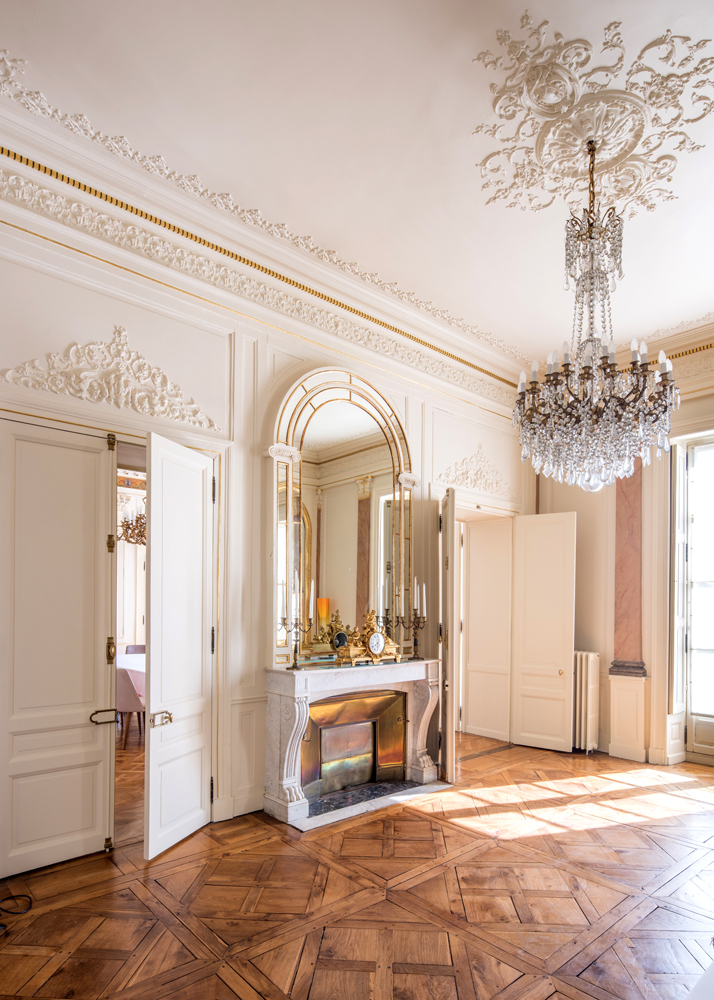
West Room - original decors

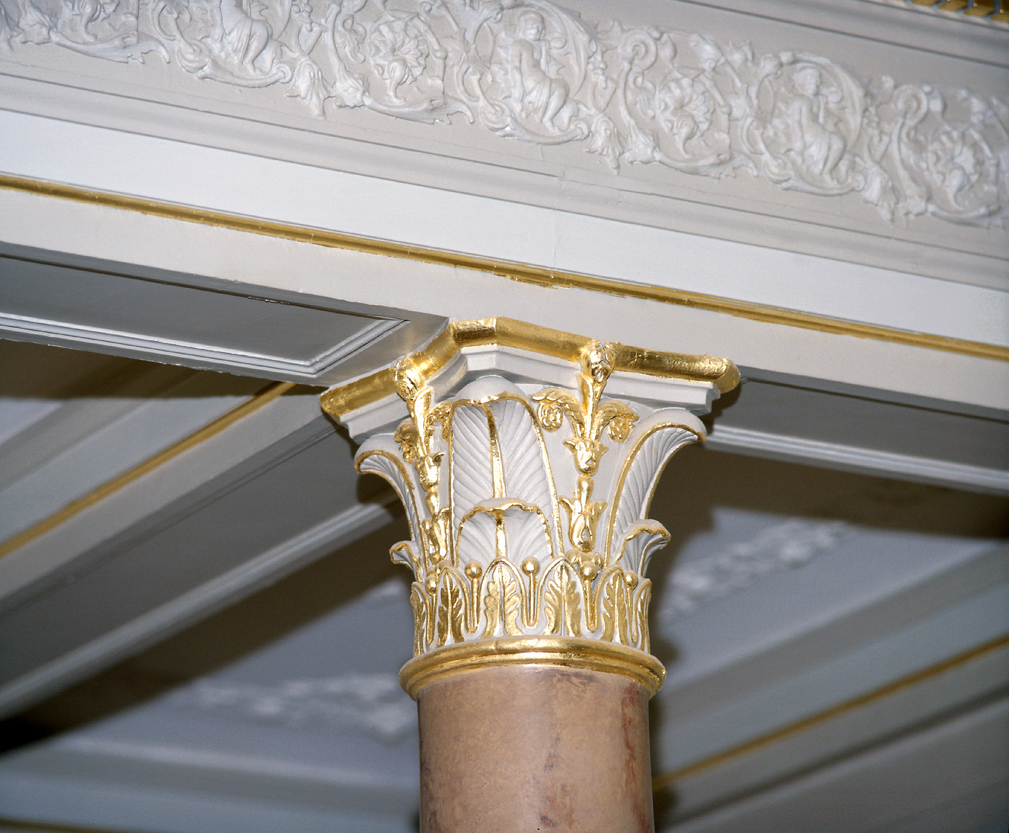
Detail of a marquee in the West lounge

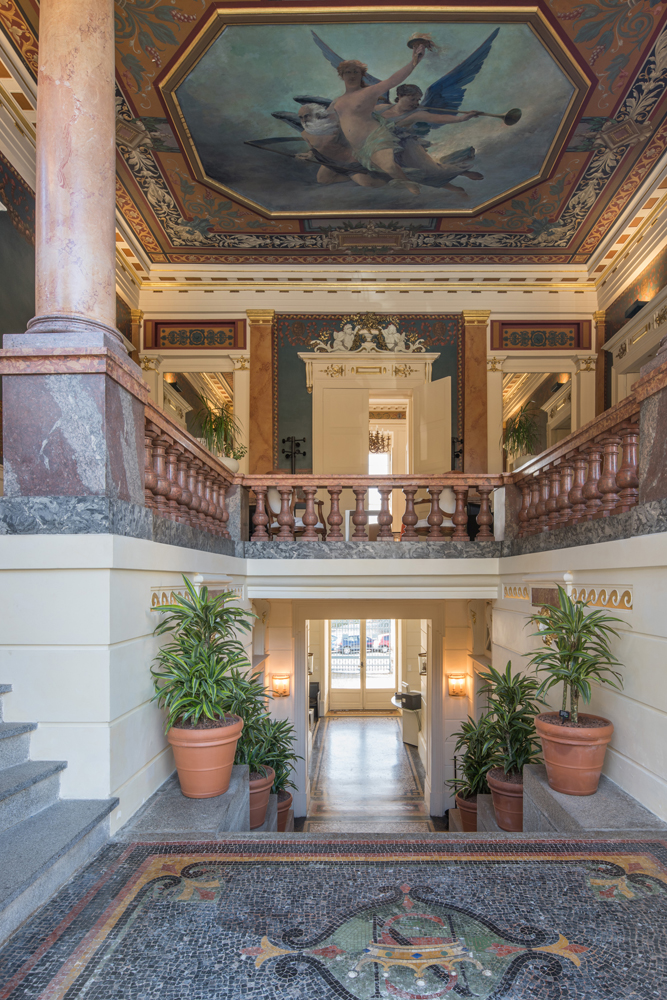
Central staircase and decorations by the Jobbé Duval and Odorico workshops

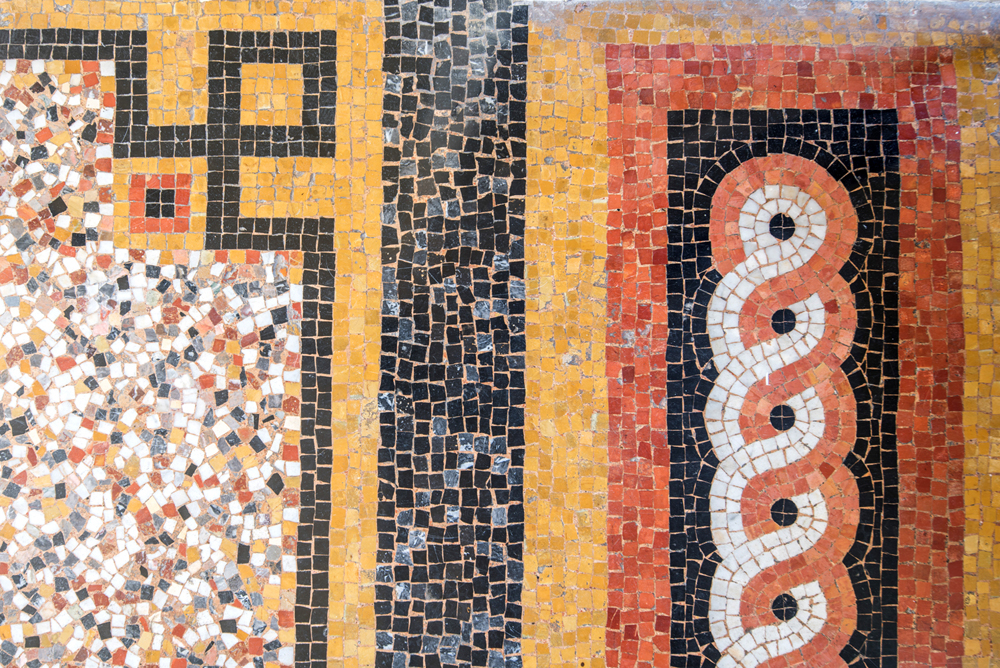
Detail of mosaic in the staircase - Odorico workshop

=== Acquisition by the regional council and restoration ===
The de Courcy family ceded the hotel to the State in 1950; administrative services are then installed there. Following the decentralization laws of 1982, the Regional Council of Brittany acquired it in 1983 to install its assembly and its services, and undertook a complete restoration. This restoration was carried out between 1984 and 1986 by the Armorican Restoration Society and the Jobbé-Duval workshop for decoration, already originating in restorations a century earlier.

The assembly hall was built in 1986 by the architect Bertrand Tessier. The terrain is difficult to grasp, between the significant drop in height and the limited space between the Bon-Pasteur building and the Hôtel de Courcy. The room is underground, with glass roofs overlooking the gardens in order to provide natural light. It is accompanied by a water fountain-wall and a sculpture designed by artist Marta Pan.

In 2005, it was the subject of a study, inventory of furniture and paintings, studies and training of maintenance personnel.

Modern additions

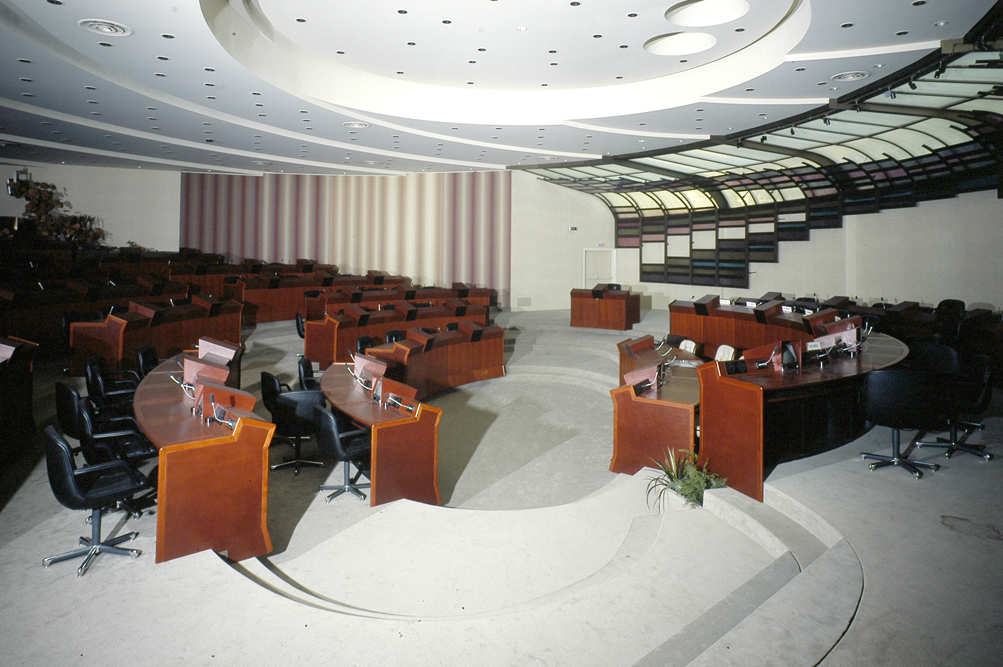
Assembly Hall (Hemicycle) by Bertrand Tessier

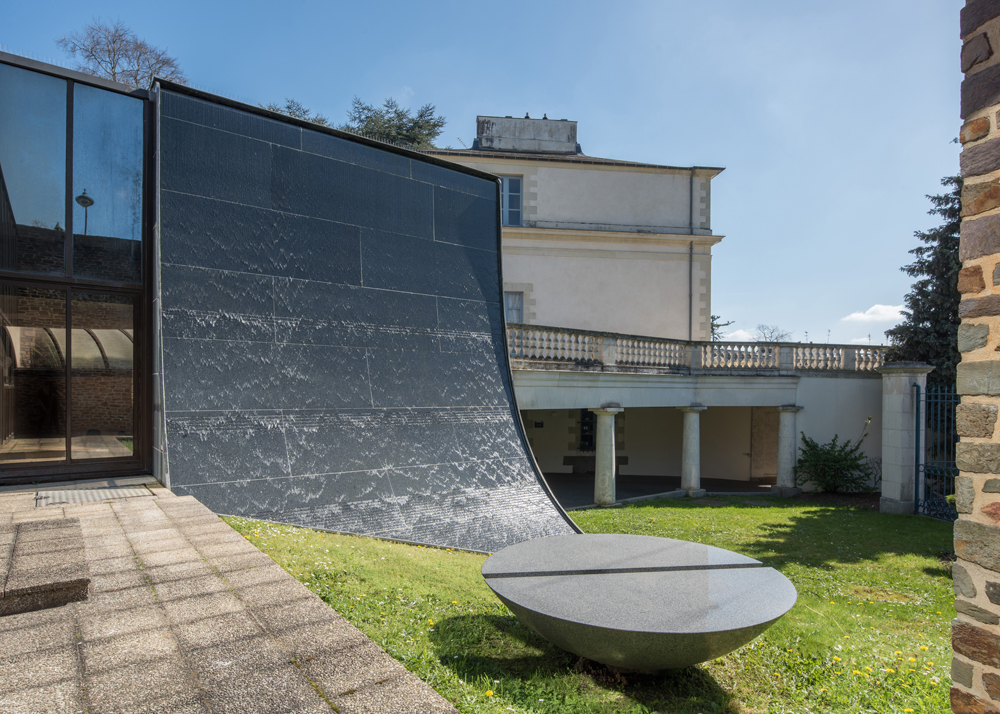
Fountain by Marta Pan

== Architecture ==
On the south side, three levels are superimposed: the slightly projecting ground floor, with a Doric peristyle, the recessed square floor whose loggia of Ionic order extends the peristyle, and the attic floor, without architectural order. The latter is surmounted by a large pediment and crowned with a belvedere on the roof. At the rear, on the north side, the first floor becomes a raised ground floor to compensate for the unevenness of the land.

Exterior

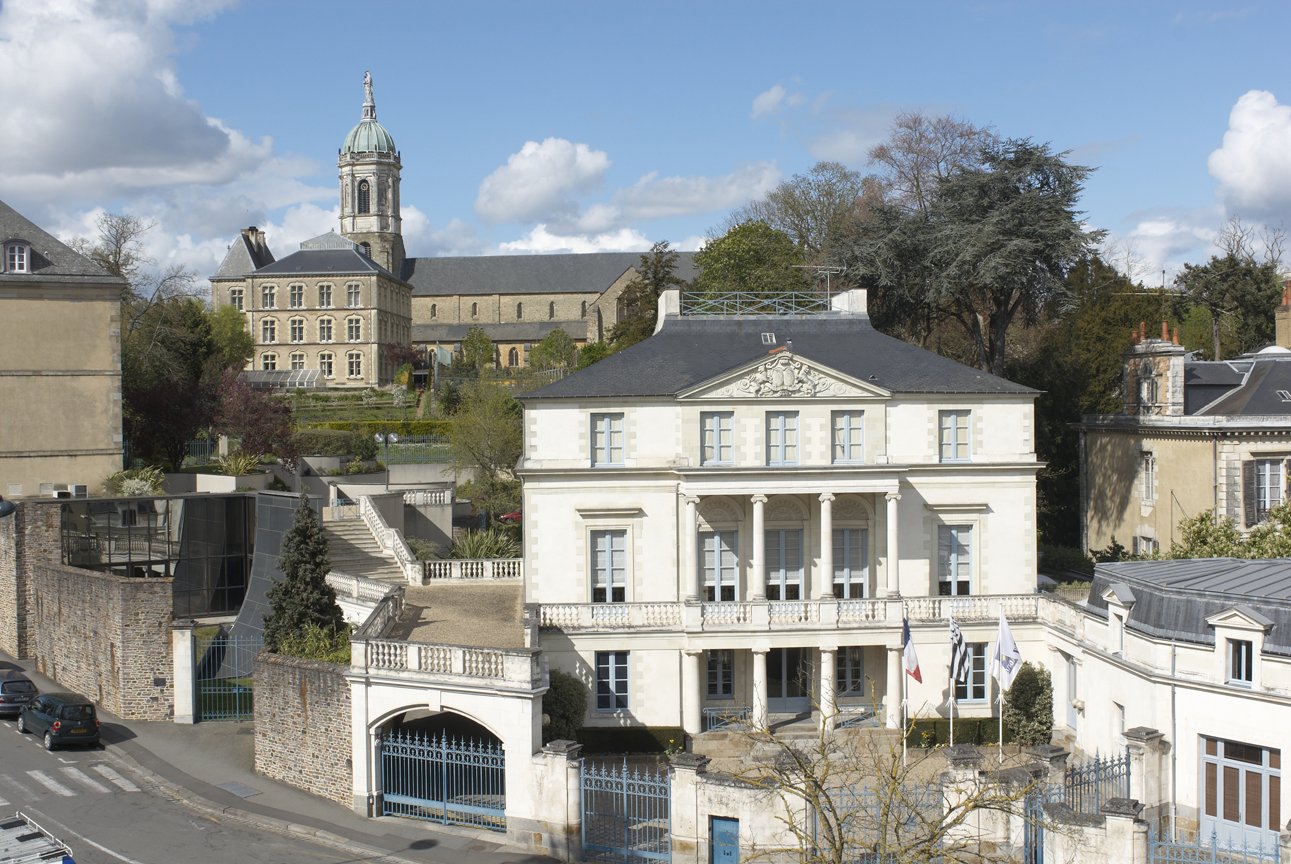
South facade - street side

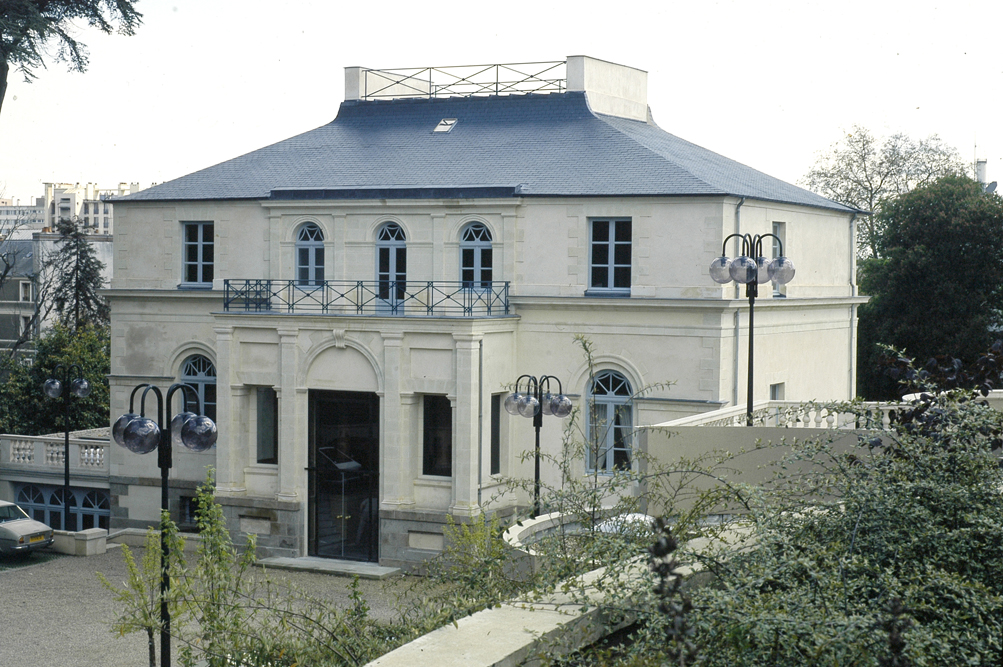
North facade - garden side
