= Plœuc-sur-Lié =

Plœuc-sur-Lié Ploheg
- Part of Plœuc-l'Hermitage
- Coat of arms
- Location of Plœuc-sur-Lié
- Location within France Location within Brittany
- Coordinates: 48°20′50″N 2°45′23″W
- Country: France
- Region: Brittany
- Department: Côtes-d'Armor
- Arrondissement: Saint-Brieuc
- Canton: Plaintel
- Commune: Plœuc-l'Hermitage
- Area^{1}: 44.45 km^{2} (17.16 sq mi)
- Highest elevation: 270 m (890 ft)
- Lowest elevation: 147 m (482 ft)
- Population (2022): 3,424
  - Density: 77.03/km^{2} (199.5/sq mi)
- Time zone: UTC+01:00 (CET)
  - Summer (DST): UTC+02:00 (CEST)
- Postal code: 22150
- ^{1} French Land Register data, which excludes lakes, ponds, glaciers > 1 km^{2} (0.386 sq mi or 247 acres) and river estuaries.

Plœuc-sur-Lié (French pronunciation: [plœk syʁ lje]; Breton: Ploheg) is a former commune in the Côtes-d'Armor department in Brittany in northwestern France. On 1 January 2016, it was merged into the new commune Plœuc-l'Hermitage.

== Geography ==
=== Climate ===
Plœuc-sur-Lié has an oceanic climate (Köppen climate classification Cfb). The average annual temperature in Plœuc-sur-Lié is 10.8 °C (51.4 °F). The average annual rainfall is 929.8 mm (36.61 in) with December as the wettest month. The temperatures are highest on average in August, at around 17.3 °C (63.1 °F), and lowest in January, at around 5.0 °C (41.0 °F). The highest temperature ever recorded in Plœuc-sur-Lié was 38.5 °C (101.3 °F) on 9 August 2003; the coldest temperature ever recorded was −13.0 °C (8.6 °F) on 2 January 1997.

Climate data for Plœuc-sur-Lié (1981–2010 averages, extremes 1986−2020)
Month	Jan	Feb	Mar	Apr	May	Jun	Jul	Aug	Sep	Oct	Nov	Dec	Year
Record high °C (°F)	16.0 (60.8)	21.4 (70.5)	22.5 (72.5)	27.8 (82.0)	29.5 (85.1)	34.3 (93.7)	36.8 (98.2)	38.5 (101.3)	31.0 (87.8)	28.2 (82.8)	20.4 (68.7)	16.1 (61.0)	38.5 (101.3)
Mean daily maximum °C (°F)	7.8 (46.0)	9.1 (48.4)	11.8 (53.2)	13.8 (56.8)	17.5 (63.5)	20.3 (68.5)	22.3 (72.1)	22.7 (72.9)	19.7 (67.5)	15.6 (60.1)	11.2 (52.2)	8.3 (46.9)	15.0 (59.0)
Daily mean °C (°F)	5.0 (41.0)	5.7 (42.3)	7.6 (45.7)	9.2 (48.6)	12.6 (54.7)	15.1 (59.2)	17.1 (62.8)	17.3 (63.1)	14.7 (58.5)	11.7 (53.1)	7.9 (46.2)	5.4 (41.7)	10.8 (51.4)
Mean daily minimum °C (°F)	2.2 (36.0)	2.4 (36.3)	3.4 (38.1)	4.5 (40.1)	7.6 (45.7)	9.9 (49.8)	12.0 (53.6)	11.8 (53.2)	9.6 (49.3)	7.8 (46.0)	4.6 (40.3)	2.5 (36.5)	6.5 (43.7)
Record low °C (°F)	−13.0 (8.6)	−9.5 (14.9)	−10.0 (14.0)	−5.5 (22.1)	−2.5 (27.5)	−0.5 (31.1)	3.8 (38.8)	1.5 (34.7)	−1.0 (30.2)	−7.0 (19.4)	−6.0 (21.2)	−10.5 (13.1)	−13.0 (8.6)
Average precipitation mm (inches)	102.2 (4.02)	87.6 (3.45)	64.7 (2.55)	73.2 (2.88)	64.4 (2.54)	55.8 (2.20)	50.8 (2.00)	50.1 (1.97)	73.4 (2.89)	97.0 (3.82)	104.9 (4.13)	105.7 (4.16)	929.8 (36.61)
Average precipitation days (≥ 1.0 mm)	14.2	12.8	12.0	12.5	9.8	8.1	8.2	7.9	9.1	13.6	14.8	14.5	137.5
Source: Météo France

== Population ==
Inhabitants of Plœuc-sur-Lié are called plœucois in French.

Historical population
Year	Pop.	±% p.a.
1962	2,904	—
1968	2,932	+0.16%
1975	2,901	−0.15%
1982	3,009	+0.52%
1990	2,932	−0.32%
1999	2,937	+0.02%
2006	3,144	+0.98%
2022	3,424	+0.53%
Source: EHESS and INSEE

== History ==
The oldest antiquity may be the menhir of Bayo. In 1643, as a reward for services rendered at the siege of La Rochelle (1627-1628), Louis XIV granted Sebastian de Ploeuc the right to hold four fairs a year and also a weekly market. In 1664, the de Ploeuc family sold its lands to the La Rivières, whose coat of arms can still be seen on the Moulien de la Corbière. The Count de La Rivière was the ancestor of Lafayette, who sold his estates at Ploeuc to cover the expenses which fell on him as a result of the American War of Independence. This war also caused great harm to the local linen industry.

Today, Plœuc-sur-Lié retains its rural character, with a prosperous agriculture which is largely from potato growing. Apart from the Bayo menhir, there are many restored old houses, windmills, and nearby forests.

== See also ==
- Communes of the Côtes-d'Armor department
