= Danielle Bousquet =

French politician (born 1945)

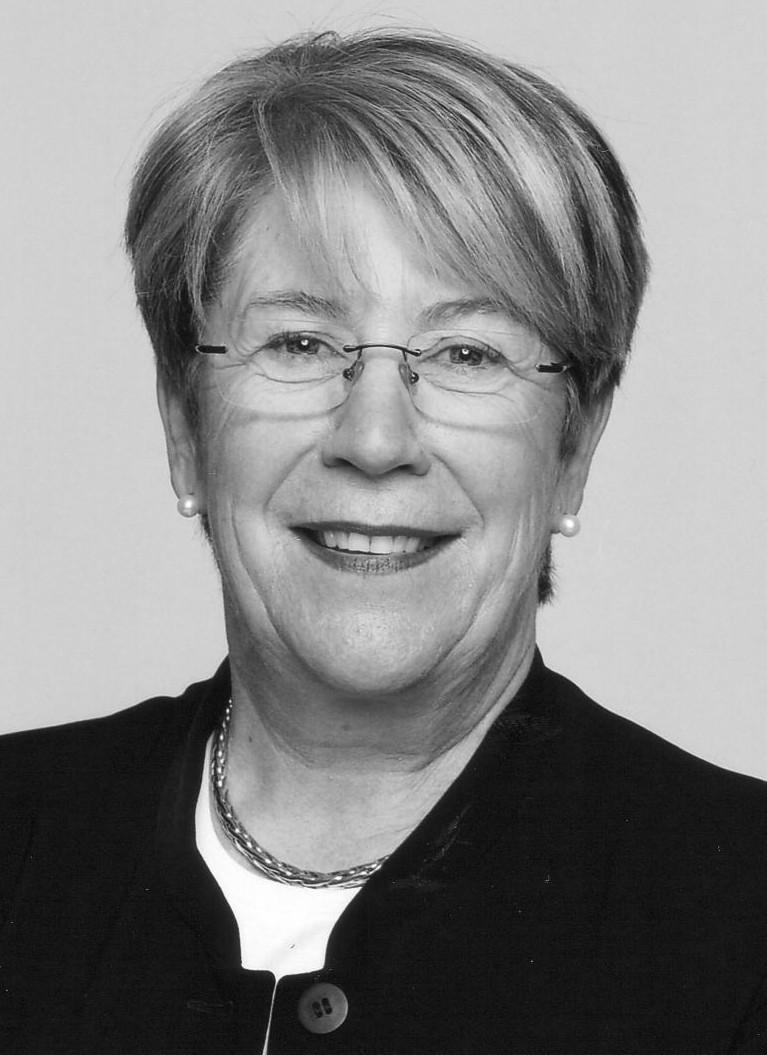

Member of the National Assembly for Côtes-d'Armor's 1st constituency
- In office 12 June 1997 – 19 June 2012
- Preceded by: Christian Daniel
- Succeeded by: Michel Lesage

Personal details
- Born: 10 May 1945 (age 80) Plœuc-sur-Lié, Côtes-d'Armor, Brittany, France
- Party: Socialist

Danielle Bousquet (born 10 May 1945) was a member of the National Assembly of France. She represented the 1st constituency of the Côtes-d'Armor department as a member of the Socialiste, radical, citoyen et divers gauche. She was a member of parliament from 1997 to 2012.
