= L'Hermitage-Lorge =

L'Hermitage-Lorge Peniti-Koedrac'h
- Part of Plœuc-l'Hermitage
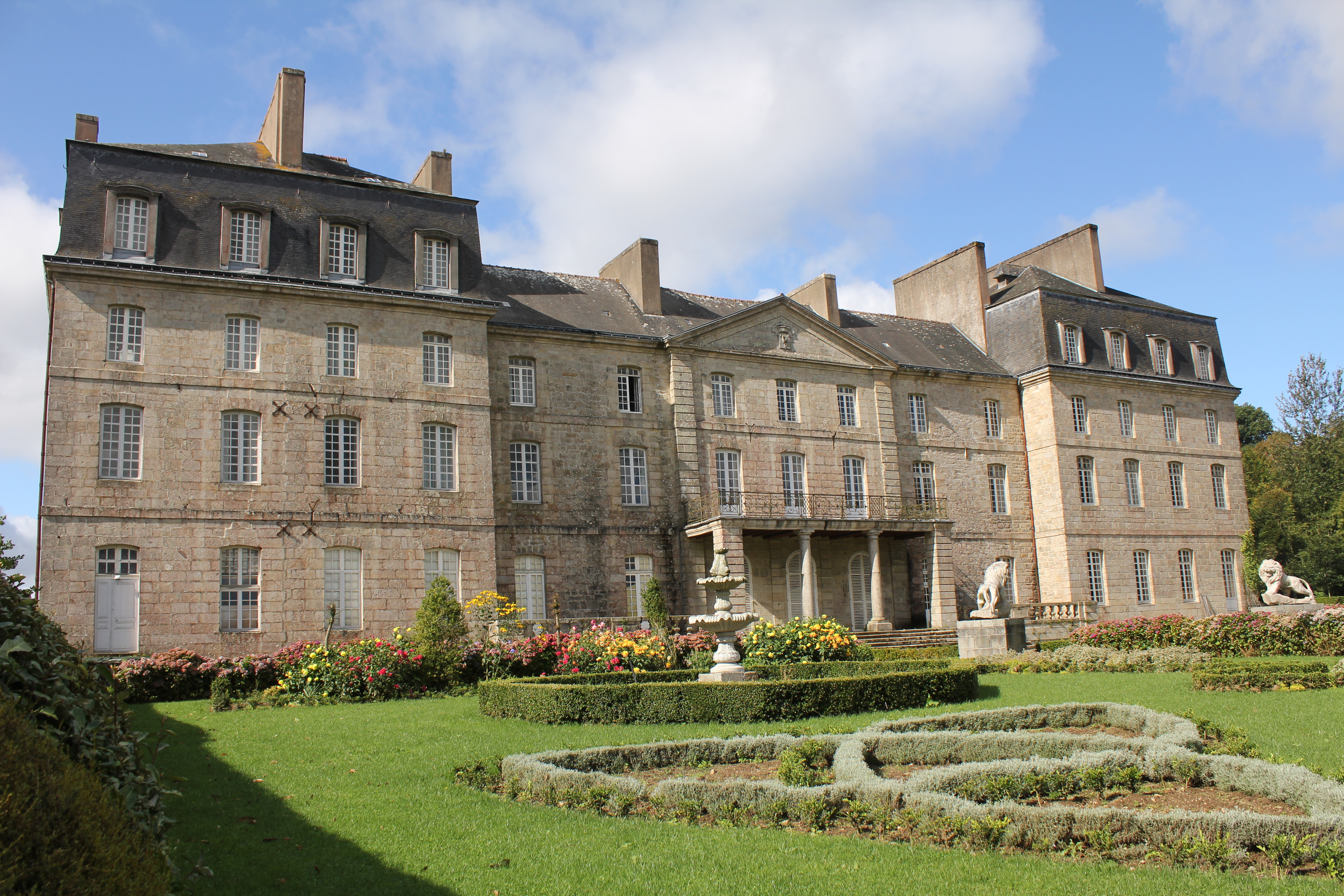
- Chateau of Lorges

- Coat of arms
- Location of L'Hermitage-Lorge
- Location within France Location within Brittany
- Coordinates: 48°19′57″N 2°49′39″W
- Country: France
- Region: Brittany
- Department: Côtes-d'Armor
- Arrondissement: Saint-Brieuc
- Canton: Plaintel
- Commune: Plœuc-l'Hermitage
- Area^{1}: 37.82 km^{2} (14.60 sq mi)
- Highest elevation: 295 m (968 ft)
- Lowest elevation: 169 m (554 ft)
- Population (2023): 691
  - Density: 18.3/km^{2} (47.3/sq mi)
- Time zone: UTC+01:00 (CET)
  - Summer (DST): UTC+02:00 (CEST)
- Postal code: 22150
- ^{1} French Land Register data, which excludes lakes, ponds, glaciers > 1 km^{2} (0.386 sq mi or 247 acres) and river estuaries.

L'Hermitage-Lorge (French pronunciation: [lɛʁmitaʒ lɔʁʒ]; Breton: Peniti-Koedrac'h) is a former commune in the Côtes-d'Armor department of Brittany in northwestern France. On 1 January 2016, it was merged into the new commune Plœuc-l'Hermitage.

== See also ==
- Communes of the Côtes-d'Armor department
