= Mickaël Cosson =

French politician

- Appointed by: June 22, 2022
- Preceded by: Bruno Joncour
- Constituency: Côtes-d'Armor's 1st constituency

Personal details
- Born: 29 November 1975 (age 50) Saint-Brieuc, France
- Party: Democratic Movement
- Occupation: DDTM manager

Mickaël Cosson, born November 29, 1975, in Saint-Brieuc, is a French politician. Mayor of Hillion from 2014 to 2022, he was elected deputy in the first constituency of Côtes-d'Armor in the 2022 legislative elections.

== Biography ==
A civil servant with the Direction départementale des territoires et de la mer (DDTM), his political career began in Hillion in 2014, the year he was elected mayor of the commune: he beat the list led by outgoing divers gauche mayor Yvette Doré. He also became vice-president of Saint-Brieuc Agglomération and then Saint-Brieuc Armor Agglomération.

Widely re-elected first mayor in 2020, he is a candidate in the 2021 departmental elections in the canton of Trégueux. Paired with outgoing departmental councillor Sylvie Guignard, he was defeated in the second round by left-wing union candidates Denis Hamayon and Christine Métois-Le Bras.

In 2022, the outgoing MP for the first constituency, Bruno Joncour, did not stand for a second term, and Mickaël Cosson was nominated by the "Ensemble" coalition, which brings together the political movements of the presidential majority. In the first round, he came second to the candidate nominated by the NUPES, and in the second round, he came out on top, beating the insoumise Marion Gorgiard.

In mid-September, in order to comply with the law on the accumulation of mandates, he relinquished his seat as mayor to Annie Guennou, his former first deputy, who had been acting mayor since the summer.

== Details of functions and offices ==
=== Parliamentary mandate ===
- Since June 22, 2022: Member of Parliament for the first constituency of Côtes-d'Armor

=== Local offices ===
- March 28, 2014 - September 16, 2022: Mayor of Hillion
- Vice-president of Saint-Brieuc Armor Agglomération
