= Reunification of Brittany =

Political movement in Brittany (France)

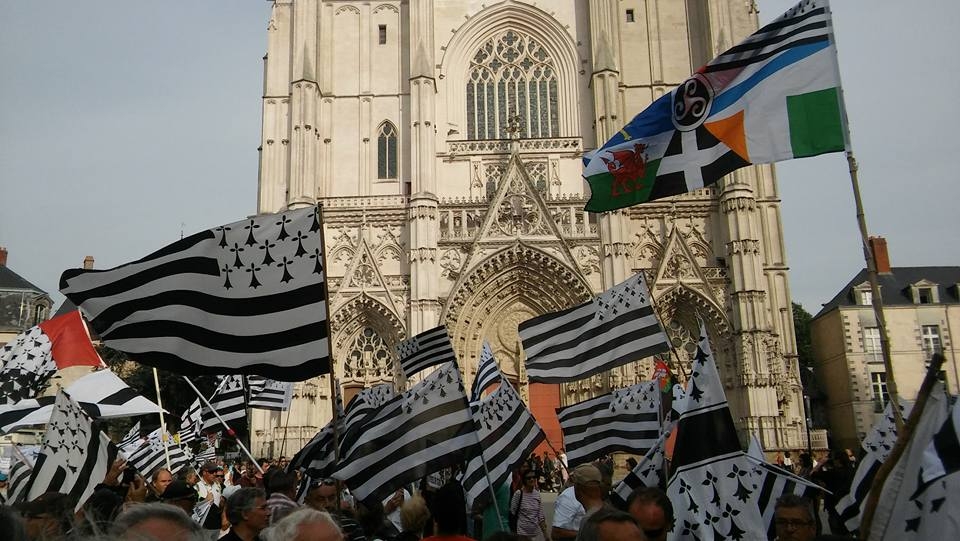
Breton and Pan-Celtic flags, Church of Saint-Pierre and Saint-Paul during the Maniff Breizh (in support of the reunification of Brittany) in Nantes on 24 September 2016

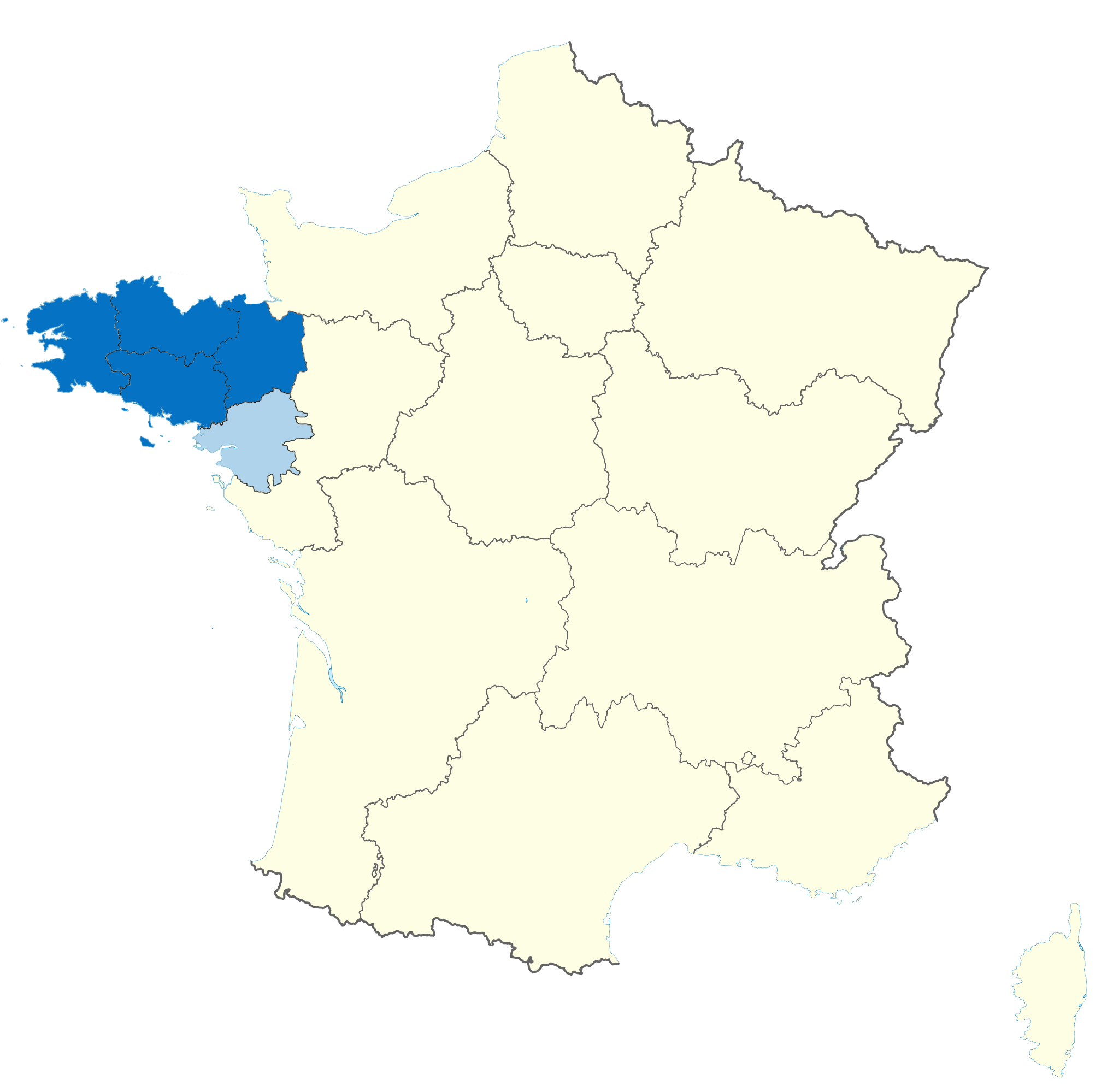
French administrative regions, with Brittany in dark blue and the Loire-Atlantique department in light blue

The Reunification of Brittany or Breton Reunification is a political movement to reunite the Loire-Atlantique department with the administrative region of Brittany, to form the entire cultural and historical region of Brittany. This reunification is considered by many Breton regionalists as a prerequisite for further Breton autonomy.

== Background ==
Brittany was an independent kingdom from the ninth century, then became a duchy until the dissolution of the French monarchy.

In 1941, the Vichy government separated the region of Loire-Atlantique from historic Brittany, which today remains a part of the Pays de la Loire administrative region. Loire-Atlantique, including Brittany's ancient Duchy capital of Nantes, was separated from the rest of Brittany partly in retaliation for a large number of Bretons supporting the Free French National Council of Charles de Gaulle and also as an attack on Bretons who supported the independence of Brittany.

== Movement ==
The division of Brittany has been disputed by Breton militants, who say it was imposed via a non-democratic government without consulting the people of Brittany. They argue that the administrative regions of Loire-Atlantique and Brittany are culturally, historically and geographically united and that Breton unity would bring about economic benefit.

=== Early official calls ===
On 30 June 2001, 60 years after the division of historic Brittany, a mass demonstration occurred in Nantes calling to reunite Brittany. After this, the Loire-Atlantique council voted unanimously for reunification but in October the Rennes municipal council opposed this.

On 8 October 2004, the Regional Council of Brittany unanimously voted for a resolution "in favour of the administrative reunification of Brittany". They proposed cooperation with the General Council of Loire-Atlantique in matters of mandatory and optional competencies and for the organisation of a unity referendum.

=== 2014 regional organisation ===
Former Prime Minister Jean-Marc Ayrault and mayor of Nantes said it was "in the interest of the people" to merge the Loire-Atlantique with Brittany. His successor as mayor of Nantes, Johanna Rolland, added, "For the future of our territories and the people living in them, let's fight for a merger of Pays de la Loire and Bretagne”. Marc Le Fur, a member of parliament for the UMP party, said that President Hollande was "upholding Vichy [the wartime French state]". "He hasn't listened to his Breton ministers, or the Breton members of parliament, or to local businesses, or to cultural leaders. He is deaf. He won't listen to anyone." The organisation 44=BZH accused the French government of listening only to Loire-Atlantique's political leaders, who they claim are desperate to keep their jobs and are ignoring the views of the people of Brittany.

=== Public support ===
In 2014, between 13,000 and 30,000 people paraded in support of reunification. In 2016 there was also a parade of between 2,500 and 10,000 people.

In October 2018, 1,500 to 3,000 people paraded in Nantes for the reunification of Brittany, calling for a referendum to reunite Loire-Atlantique with Brittany.

In November 2018, over 100,000 citizens of Loire-Atlantique had signed a petition proposed by Bretagne réunie (Brittany reunited) to reunite Loire-Atlantique with Brittany.

In August 2025, according to an Ipsos poll, 48% of respondents are in favor of the attachment of Loire-Atlantique to administrative Brittany.

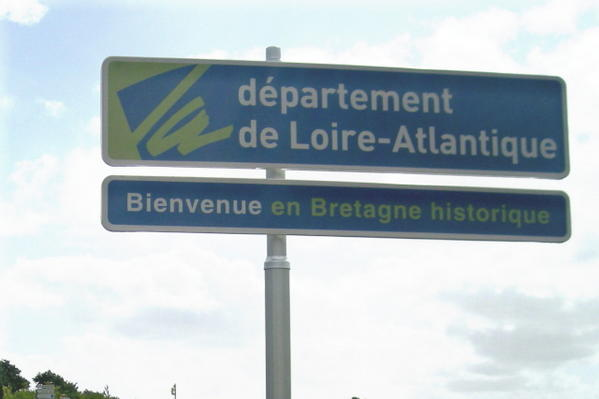
A road sign in Loire-Atlantique that says "welcome to historical Brittany"

=== Loire-Atlantique officials ===
In December 2018, the Departmental Council of Loire-Atlantique voted against modifying the regional boundaries directly, but in favour of a referendum on including Loire-Atlantique in the Brittany region.

In 2021, Nantes town council voted in favour of requesting that the French government organise a referendum on Nantes leaving the Pays-de-la-Loire region to become part of Brittany.

In June 2022, Loire-Atlantique council supported a resolution for a referendum.

=== Regional Council of Brittany ===
In October 2021, the Regional Council of Brittany supported a resolution requesting that the French government “begins, with a view to 2024, the legislative process for consulting the electors of Loire-Atlantique on whether or not they wish to join Brittany”.

In 2022, Aziliz Gouez, leader of the Breizh a-Gleiz group of Breton autonomists, supported the reunification of Brittany, which is seen as a prerequisite for a process of autonomy for Brittany. Her call for Breton autonomy was voted for by all the regional councillors (except for far-right Rassemblement National).

In September 2022, the Regional Council of Brittany voted in favour of an impact assessment on reunification, to be jointly financially supported Loire-Atlantique. The results of the impact assessment are due to be published by March 2023 with hope of a consultation.

In May 2023, a "transpartisan" body was formed in Nantes to "create the conditions for dialogue between communities and the State about the organisation of this citizen consultation", with the hope that a referendum can be held quickly. Twenty-five deputies of the five departments of historical Brittany signed a bill for a consultation with the inhabitants of Loire Atlantique on reunification.

In September 2023, in response to an offer by Emmanuel Macron to work towards greater autonomy for Corsica, Loïg Chesnais-Girard, president of the Brittany regional council, noted the disparity between the proposal and the "system of inefficient centralism from another age".

== International support ==
In 2014, a motion was signed in the UK House of Commons by 10 MPs supporting the reunification of the historic region of Brittany during the French government's reorganisation of France's super regions.

In the same year, a written statement of opinion from politicians of Plaid Cymru in the Senedd also called on the French government to restore the historic boundaries of Brittany.

In 2015, the European Free Alliance reaffirmed its support for the administrative reunification of Brittany with a single assembly.

== Opposition ==
Those opposed to Breton reunification argue that it could lead to a dispute between the capitals of Rennes and Nantes and that a united Brittany would not be big enough to deal with international economic competition and so propose a larger zone of the "Great West".

== Polling ==
=== Loire-Atlantique ===
Date	Polling organization	Client	Support for reunification		Notes
Date	Polling organization	Client	Yes	No	Notes
May 2021	IFOP	A la Bretonne !	63%	37%	
2019	TMO	—	62%	—	
July 2019	TMO	Dibab/Breizh Civic Lab	53%	25%	
July 2014	Unknown	Senedd Cymru	70%	—	
April 2014	LH2	France 24	63%	—	
December 2012	IFOP	Bretons	58%	—	
March 2009	OpinionWay	–	68%	—	
June 2006	IFOP	General Council of Loire-Atlantique	67%	—	
May 2003	ISPOS	Bretagne Magazine	69%	–	
October 2002	IFOP	Ouest-France	71%	—	
June 2001	IFOP	Ouest-France	75%	—	
September 2000	CSA	Presse Océan/Le Télégramme	71%	—	
March 1999	TMO	Ouest-France	68%	—	
April 1998	SOFRES	Le Pèlerin	62%	—	

=== Brittany administrative region ===
Date	Polling organization	Client	Support for reunification		Notes
Date	Polling organization	Client	Yes	No	Notes
2019	TMO	—	68%	—	
July 2019	TMO	Dibab/Breizh Civic Lab	47%	31%	
July 2014	Unknown	Senedd Cymru	75%	—	
April 2014	LH2	France 24	57%	—	
March 2009	OpinionWay	–	70%	—	
May 2003	ISPOS	Bretagne Magazine	72%	–	
November 2002	IFOP	Ouest-France	67%	—	
November 2001	Efficience 3	Economic and Social Research Council	63%	—	
September 2000	CSA	Presse Océan/Le Télégramme	63%	—	

=== Brittany (five departments) ===
Date	Polling organization	Client	Support for reunification		Notes
Date	Polling organization	Client	Yes	No	Notes
August 2025	ISPOS	Régions et Peuples Solidaires	48%	43%	
January 2018	TMO	Dibab	50%	30%	
January 2014	TMO	BCD Sevenadurioù	58%	—	
January 2013	IFOP	Bretons	44%	36%	
January 2009	TMO	BCD Sevenadurioù	53%	—	
May 2003	ISPOS	Bretagne Magazine	71%	–	
October 2002	IFOP	Ouest-France	56%	—	
July 2002	IFOP	Ouest-France	75%	16%	
July 2001	Cole & Loughlin	—	62%	—	
September 2000	CSA	Presse Océan/Le Télégramme	65%	—	

== See also ==
=== Brittany ===
- Breton nationalism

=== Other countries ===
- Pan-Celtism
- Cornish nationalism
- Cornish devolution
- Welsh nationalism
- Welsh devolution
- Welsh independence
- United Ireland
- Galician independence movement
- Corsican autonomy
- Catalan independence movement
