= Claude Saunier =

French politician (1943–2022)

Member of the French Senate for Côtes-d'Armor
- In office 1989–2008

Mayor of Saint-Brieuc
- In office 1983–2001
- Preceded by: Yves Le Foll
- Succeeded by: Bruno Joncour

Personal details
- Born: 26 February 1943 Saint-Brieuc, France
- Died: 17 October 2022 (aged 79) Saint-Brieuc, France
- Party: Socialist Party
- Education: University of Rennes

Claude Saunier (26 February 1943 – 17 October 2022) was a French politician. He served as mayor of Saint-Brieuc and also sat in the French Senate.
