= Regional Council of Brittany =

Regional Legislature of Brittany, France

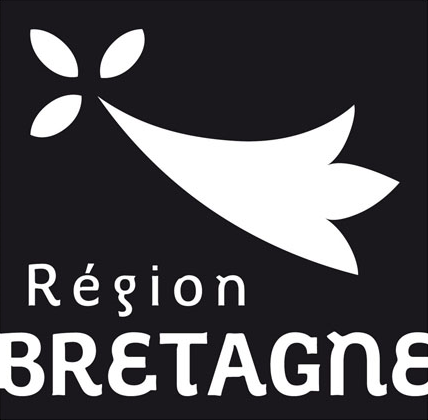

Type
- Type: Unicameral Regional Legislature

Leadership
- President: Loïg Chesnais-Girard, PS since 22 June 2017

Structure
- Seats: 83
- Political groups: Government (45): Socialist Party (30); Miscellaneous Greens (5); French Communist Party (4); Ensemble Citoyens (3); Regionalists (3); Opposition (38): The Republicans (14); National Rally (8); Breton Democratic Union (7); Ensemble Citoyens (6); Europe Ecology – The Greens (3)

Elections
- Voting system: Two-round party list proportional representation with a 5% electoral threshold and 25% seat majority bonus
- Last election: June 2021

Meeting place
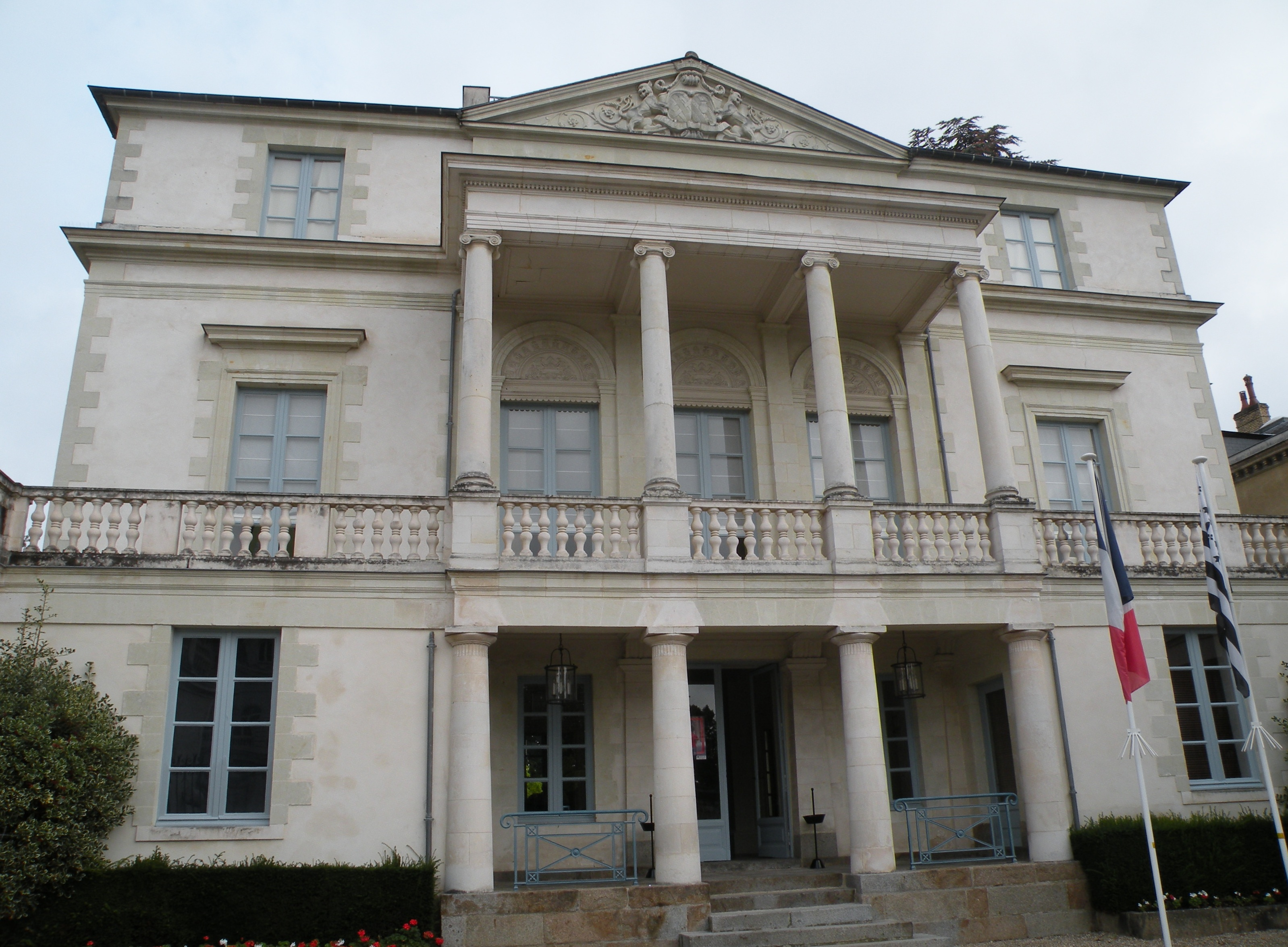
- Hôtel de Courcy, Rennes

Website
- bretagne.bzh

The Regional Council of Brittany (French: Conseil régional de Bretagne, Breton: Kuzul Rannvroel Breizh) is the regional legislature of the region of Brittany in France. It is composed of 83 councillors, elected in 2015, in office for six years until 2021.

== Seats ==
By Departments

- 17 councillors for Côtes-d'Armor
- 19 councillors for Morbihan
- 23 councillors for Ille-et-Vilaine
- 24 councillors for Finistère

=== By coalition ===
- List « Bretagne à gauche, Bretagne pour tous » (PS - PCF - PRG - Les Verts - UDB): 58 councillors
- List « L'union pour gagner » (Union for a Popular Movement/Union for French Democracy): 25 councillors

=== By party ===
Partisan composition.
Group name	Parties	Members	Status
Socialists and allies	PS	33 / 83	Governing coalition
Socialists and allies	DVG	9 / 83	Governing coalition
Socialists and allies	ex-BÉ	1 / 83	Governing coalition
Communists and progressives	PCF	2 / 83	Governing coalition
Communists and progressives	DVG	2 / 83	Governing coalition
Radical, Social and European group	PRG	2 / 83	Governing coalition
Radical, Social and European group	DVG	1 / 83	Governing coalition
Regionalists	ex-UDB	3 / 83	Governing coalition
Right, centre and regionalists	LR	13 / 83	Opposition
Right, centre and regionalists	UDI	3 / 83	Opposition
Right, centre and regionalists	MoDem	2 / 83	Opposition
National Front	FN	12 / 83	Opposition

== Past Regional Councils ==
=== From 2004 to 2010 ===
Party		seats
•	Socialist Party	36
	Union for a Popular Movement	14
	Union for French Democracy	9
•	French Communist Party	7
•	The Greens	7
•	Breton Democratic Union	4
•	Left Radical Party	2
	Miscellaneous Left	2
•	Miscellaneous Left	1

=== From 1998 to 2004 ===
Candidate	Party	Votes (Round One)	% (Round One)	Votes (Round Two)	% (Round Two)
Jean-Yves Le Drian	PS-PCF-PRG	521,980	38.48%	841,004	58.79%
Josselin de Rohan (incumbent)	UMP	347,221	25.60%	589,625	41.21%
Bruno Joncour	UDF	150,050	11.06%	-	-
Pascale Loget	Les Verts-UDB-Frankiz Breizh	131,521	9.70%	-	-
Brigitte Neveux	FN	114,883	8.47%	-	-
Françoise Dubu	LCR/LO	64,805	4.78%	-	-
Lionel David	MNR	25,992	1.92%	-	-
Total		1,356,460	100.00%	1,430,611	100.00%

=== From 1998 to 2004 ===
Party		seats
	Socialist Party	25
•	Rally for the Republic	17
•	Union for French Democracy	17
	National Front	7
	French Communist Party	6
	The Greens	3
•	Miscellaneous Right	3
	Workers' Struggle	1
	Revolutionary Communist League	1
	MRV-CAP	1
•	Ecology Generation	1
	Hunting, Fishing, Nature, Traditions	1

=== From 1992 to 1998 ===
Party		seats
•	Rally for the Republic-Union for French Democracy	41
	Socialist Party	19
	National Front	7
	The Greens	6
	Ecology Generation	6
	French Communist Party	3
	Blanc c'est exprimé	1

=== From 1986 to 1992 ===
Party		seats
•	Rally for the Republic-Union for French Democracy	45
	Socialist Party	30
	French Communist Party	4
	National Front	2

== Past presidents ==
- René Pleven (1974–1976)
- André Colin (1976–1978)
- Raymond Marcellin (1978–1986)
- Yvon Bourges (1986–1998)
- Josselin de Rohan (1998–2004)
- Jean-Yves Le Drian (2004-2012)
- Pierrick Massiot (2012-2015)
- Jean-Yves Le Drian (2015-2017)
- Loïg Chesnais-Girard (2017-)

== See also ==
- 2004 Brittany regional election
- 2004 French regional elections
- Reunification of Brittany
