= Tristan de L'Angle Beaumanoir =

French politician

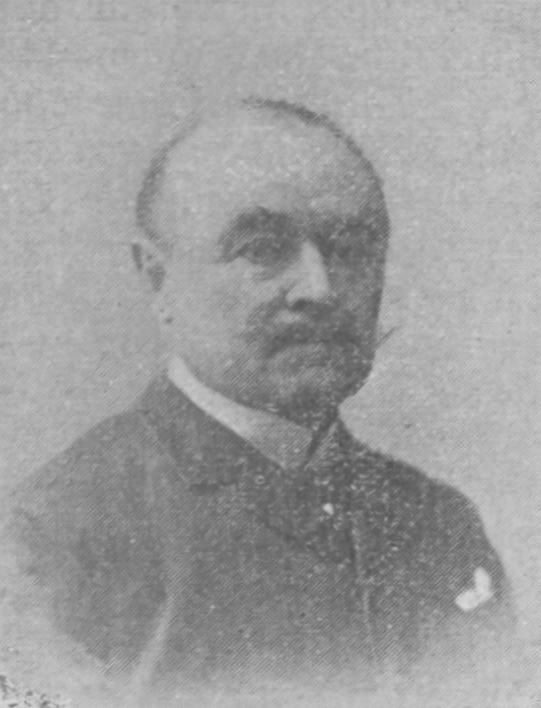
Angle-Beaumanoir, Tristan de L'

Tristan Angle-Beaumanoir (March 3, 1828 in Paris – December 6, 1895 at Evran (Côtes d'Armor)) was a French politician.

Before that, he was a naval officer. He became sub-prefect in 1867, first in Cholet and later in Coutances. Relieved by the Government of September 4, 1870, he was appointed prefect of the Cotes-du-Nord by the Conservative government of 16 May 1877 and resigned a few months later. He was a monarchist senator for Côtes-du-Nord from 1885 to 1895 and was often involved in political debates and inquiries. He was known for his sense of humor.

== Bibliography ==
- (in French) Jean Jolly (dir.), Dictionnaire des parlementaires français, Presses universitaires de France
