= Brittany (administrative region) =

Administrative region of France

Brittany: Bretagne (French); Breizh (Breton); Bertaèyn (Gallo)
- Region
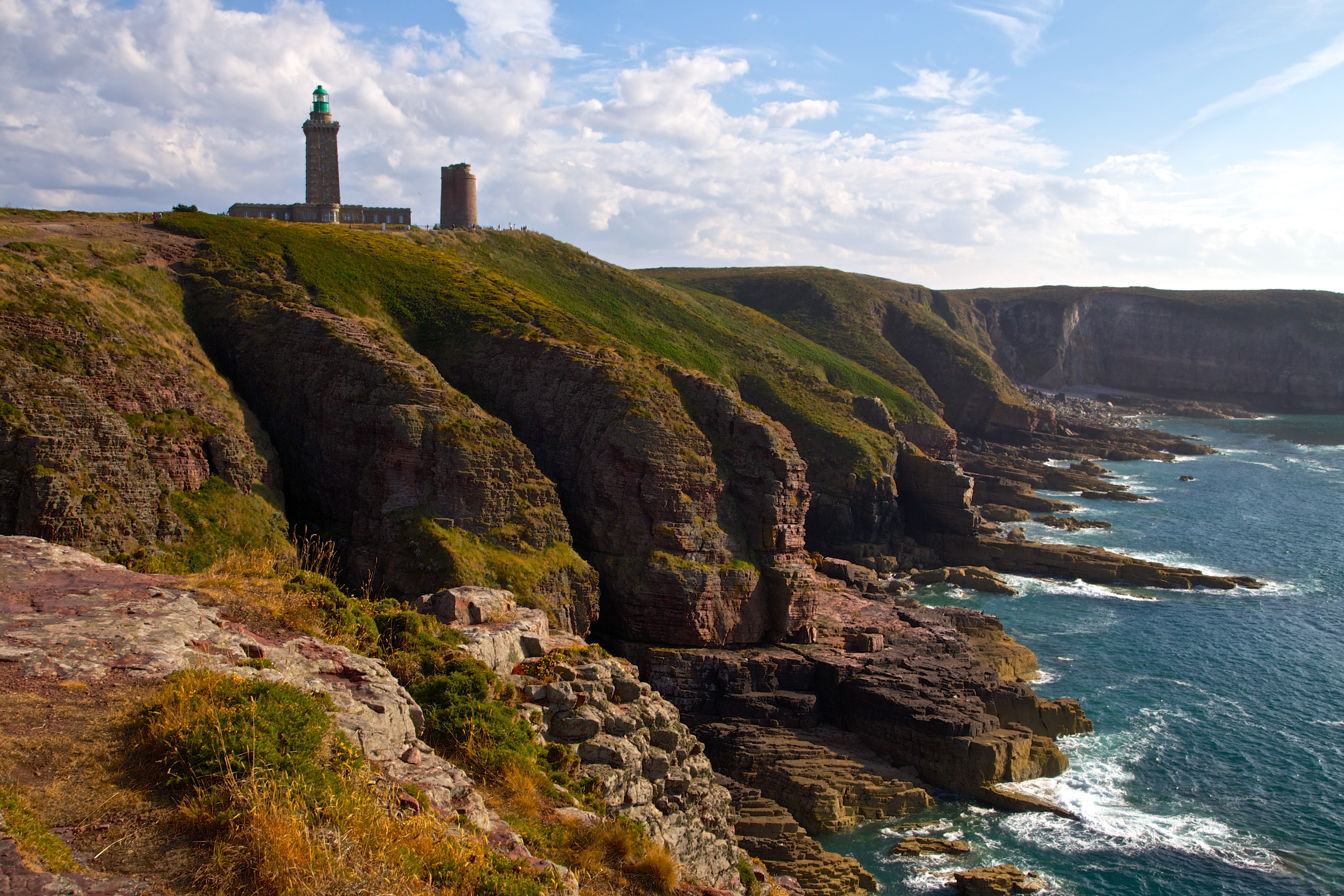
- The cliffs of Cap Fréhel and its lighthouses

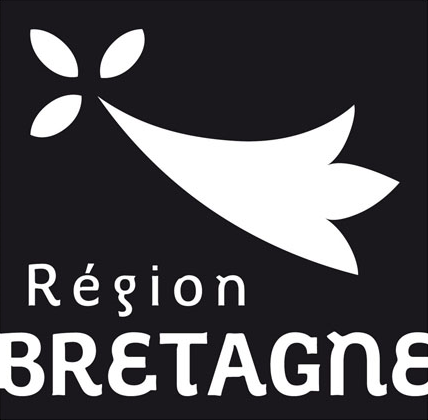
- Flag Coat of arms Brandmark
- Anthem: "Bro Gozh ma Zadoù"
- Coordinates: 48°00′N 3°00′W
- Country: France
- Prefecture: Rennes
- Departments: 4: Côtes-d'Armor (22); Finistère (29); Ille-et-Vilaine (35); Morbihan (56)

Government
  - President of the Regional Council: Loïg Chesnais-Girard

Area
  - Total: 27,208 km^{2} (10,505 sq mi)
  - Rank: 12th

Population (2023)
  - Total: 3,449,370
  - Density: 126.78/km^{2} (328.35/sq mi)

GDP
  - Total: €108.252 billion
  - Per capita: €32,500
- Time zone: UTC+01:00 (CET)
  - Summer (DST): UTC+02:00 (CEST)
- ISO 3166 code: FR-BRE
- NUTS Region: FR5
- Website: www.bretagne.bzh

Brittany (French: Bretagne [bʁətaɲ]) is an administrative region of Metropolitan France, comprising the departments of Côtes-d'Armor, Finistère, Ille-et-Vilaine, and Morbihan. Its capital and largest city is Rennes.

Bordered by the English Channel to the north, the Celtic Sea to the west, and the Atlantic Ocean (Bay of Biscay) to the south, Brittany's neighbouring regions are Normandy to the northeast and Pays de la Loire to the southeast. It is one of two regions in Metropolitan France where all departments have direct access to the sea, the other being Corsica.

The region of Brittany is sometimes referred to as "administrative Brittany" in contrast to "historical Brittany" or "cultural Brittany", which also includes the Loire-Atlantique and whose potential reunification with the administrative region has been a subject of debate for decades.

== History ==
Historical population
Year	Pop.	±% p.a.
1801	1,833,410	—
1821	1,984,950	+0.40%
1831	2,103,842	+0.58%
1841	2,180,755	+0.36%
1851	2,303,113	+0.55%
1861	2,327,414	+0.11%
1876	2,406,348	+0.22%
1881	2,446,243	+0.33%
1891	2,517,009	+0.29%
1901	2,559,398	+0.17%
1921	2,424,959	−0.27%
1936	2,396,647	−0.08%
1946	2,336,820	−0.25%
1954	2,338,803	+0.01%
1962	2,396,582	+0.31%
1968	2,468,227	+0.49%
1975	2,595,431	+0.72%
1982	2,707,886	+0.61%
1990	2,794,317	+0.39%
1999	2,904,075	+0.43%
2006	3,080,990	+0.85%
2016	3,306,529	+0.71%
2023	3,449,370	+0.61%

Brittany, located in the west-northwest corner of France, is one of the historic provinces of France. The most Atlantic of France's regions, Brittany is noted for its Celtic heritage, which sets it apart from the rest of France. It enjoys a mild climate somewhat warmer though not necessarily drier than the climate of the Cornish peninsula in southwest Britain.

The name "Brittany" derives from the Britons, an Insular Celtic (Brythonic) people who inhabited most of Great Britain during the Roman and Sub-Roman periods. During the migration period of the Early Middle Ages the Britons were displaced from most of what is now England by the Anglo-Saxon invasions, leading many to settle in western Armorica, present-day Brittany. As a result the modern Bretons have strong historical, cultural and linguistic ties with those areas of Great Britain which remained Brythonic into the modern era: Wales and Cornwall.

Initially divided into several small petty kingdoms, Brittany as a united political entity emerged in the 9th century as the Kingdom of Brittany. In the early 10th century the kingdom was devastated by Norse raids and occupation and from the mid-10th century became a vassal state of France as the Duchy of Brittany. The level of control exerted by the French kings varied over time; at various points Brittany was either subject to, aligned with or heavily influenced by the English Kings; at others it was de facto independent.

Following the Breton defeat at the hands of the French army in 1488, the duchy was forced into a dynastic union with the French crown in 1491; in 1547 it was formally incorporated as a province of France.

Following the French Revolution the French provinces were dissolved and replaced with departments; what had been Brittany became the Côtes-du-Nord (22) (renamed Côtes-d'Armor in 1990) in the north, Finistère (29) in the far west, Morbihan (56) in the south, Ille-et-Vilaine (35) in the east and Loire-Inférieure (44) (renamed Loire-Atlantique in 1957) in the southeast.

When the modern regions were established, Loire-Inférieure (44), which includes the historic capital Nantes, became part of Pays de la Loire, while the other four departments became part of the Brittany region. The capital city of the modern Brittany region is Rennes, located in the central eastern part of the region; most of the major lines of communication between Brittany and Paris pass through Rennes, which is a large industrial and university city. Other important cities in the region are Brest, one of the two most important French naval ports, Saint-Malo, an imposing walled city on the north coast, and Vannes, the capital of the Morbihan, with an attractive old town centre. Quimper, the capital of the Finistère, and Saint-Brieuc, the capital of the Côtes-d'Armor, are less important. Lorient, in the Morbihan, was once a major shipping port trading with – as its name suggests – the Orient; but its shipping and shipbuilding industries have largely declined, and like other ports on the south coast of Brittany, is better known today for its yachting and yacht-building industry. It is also the venue for Brittany's annual Interceltiques music and culture festival.

Despite its limited size, Brittany is quite a diverse region; the north and west coasts, open to the force of the North Atlantic, are rugged and rocky, with sandy coves and beaches. The south coast, facing onto the Bay of Biscay, is flatter, much milder, and has a number of large sandy beaches. There are also many inlets on the south coast, such as La Trinité sur Mer, which in the past have been ports and commercial harbours, but today are more popular with yachtsmen and a dwindling fishing industry. The sea here is warmer in summer. The backbone of Brittany is a granite ridge stretching from east to west, peaking in the Monts d'Arrée. But most of inland Brittany is farming country, a region known for its milk and butter and its early crops.

As a holiday region, it is Brittany's coasts that attract the greatest number of visitors; the inland regions have attracted many second-home owners from other parts of France, and from Britain. In cultural terms, Brittany has its own language and Celtic cultural tradition that set it apart from the rest of France. The Breton language, though not much used in everyday life, and not understood by most of the modern population, has made a comeback in recent years, and is taught in many schools. Celtic traditions are reflected in Breton folk music, its Celtic festivals, and its prehistoric monuments.

== Geography ==
=== Territory ===
The region of Brittany was created in 1941 from four of the five departments constituting the territory of traditional Brittany. The other is Loire-Atlantique, which is included in the region of Pays de la Loire, whose capital, Nantes, was a historical capital of the Duchy of Brittany.

The capital of the administrative region is Rennes, although Nantes is considered the capital of historic Brittany and is located in Loire-Atlantique. The reunification of Brittany is supported by a majority of Loire-Atlantique and is considered a prerequisite to further autonomy of Brittany as a whole.

Part of the reason Brittany was split between two present-day regions was to avoid the rivalry between Rennes and Nantes. Although Nantes was the principal capital of the Duchy of Brittany until the sixteenth century, Rennes had been the seat of the Duchy's supreme court of justice between 1560 and 1789. Rennes had also been the administrative capital of the Intendant of Brittany between 1689 and 1789, and Intendances were the most important administrative units of the kingdom of France in the seventeenth and eighteenth centuries. As for the provincial States of Brittany, a legislative body which had originally met every two years in a different city of Brittany, that had met in Rennes only between 1728 and 1789, although not in the years 1730, 1758, and 1760. Despite that, the Chambre des comptes had remained in Nantes until 1789. However, from 1381 until the end of the 15th century Vannes (Gwened in Breton) had served as the administrative capital of the Duchy, remaining the seat of its Chambre des comptes until the 1490s, and also the seat of its Parlement until 1553 and then again between 1675 and 1689.

Although there were previous plans to create regions out of the departments, like the Clémentel plan (1919) or the Vichy regionalisation programme (1941), these plans had no effect or else were abolished in 1945. The current French regions date from 1956 and were created by gathering departments together. In Brittany, this led to the creation of the new region of Brittany, which included only four out of the five historical Breton departments. The term région was officially created by the Law of Decentralisation (2 March 1982), which also gave regions their legal status. The first direct elections for regional representatives took place on 16 March 1986.

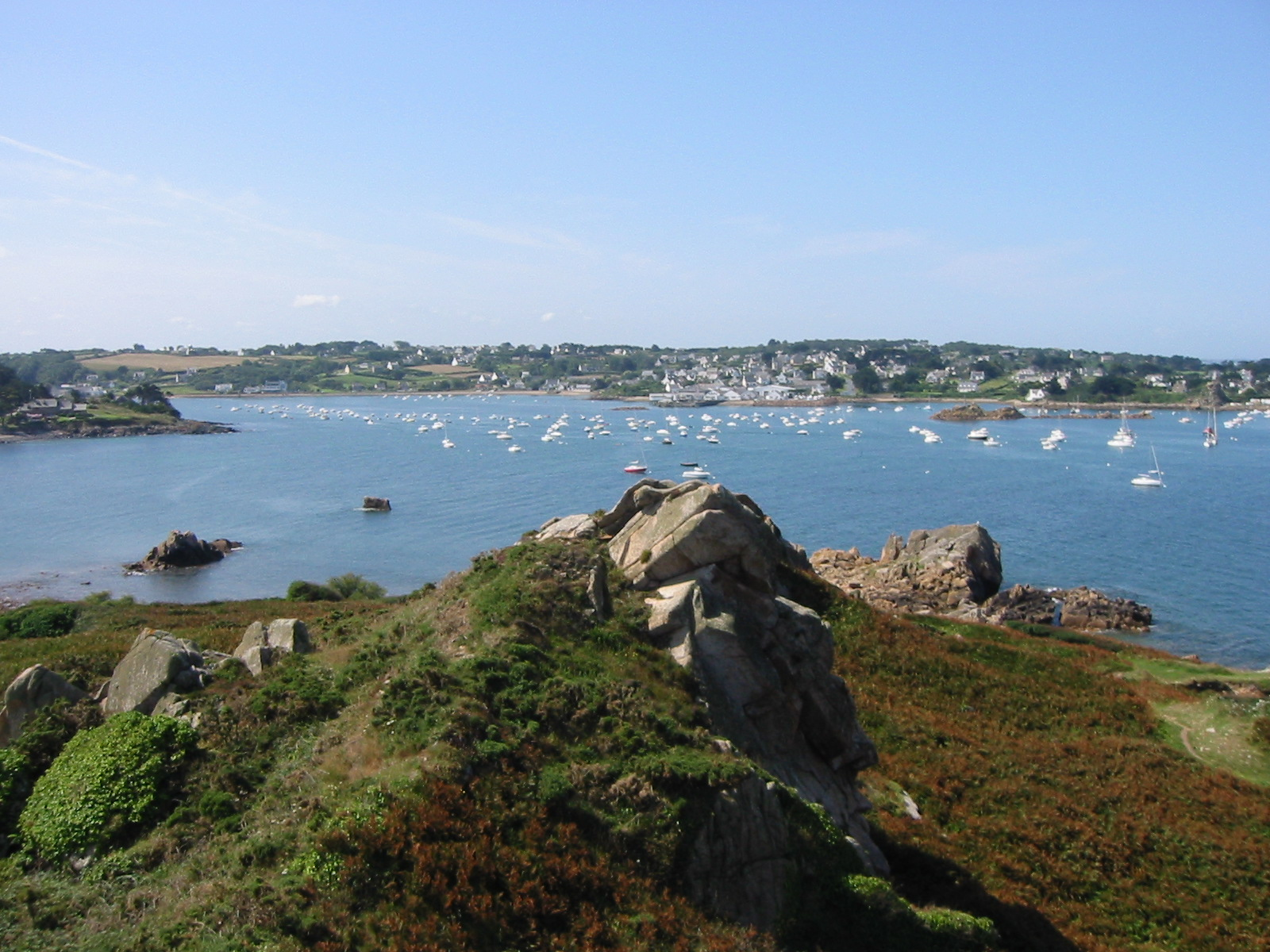
Le Diben harbour – Plougasnou

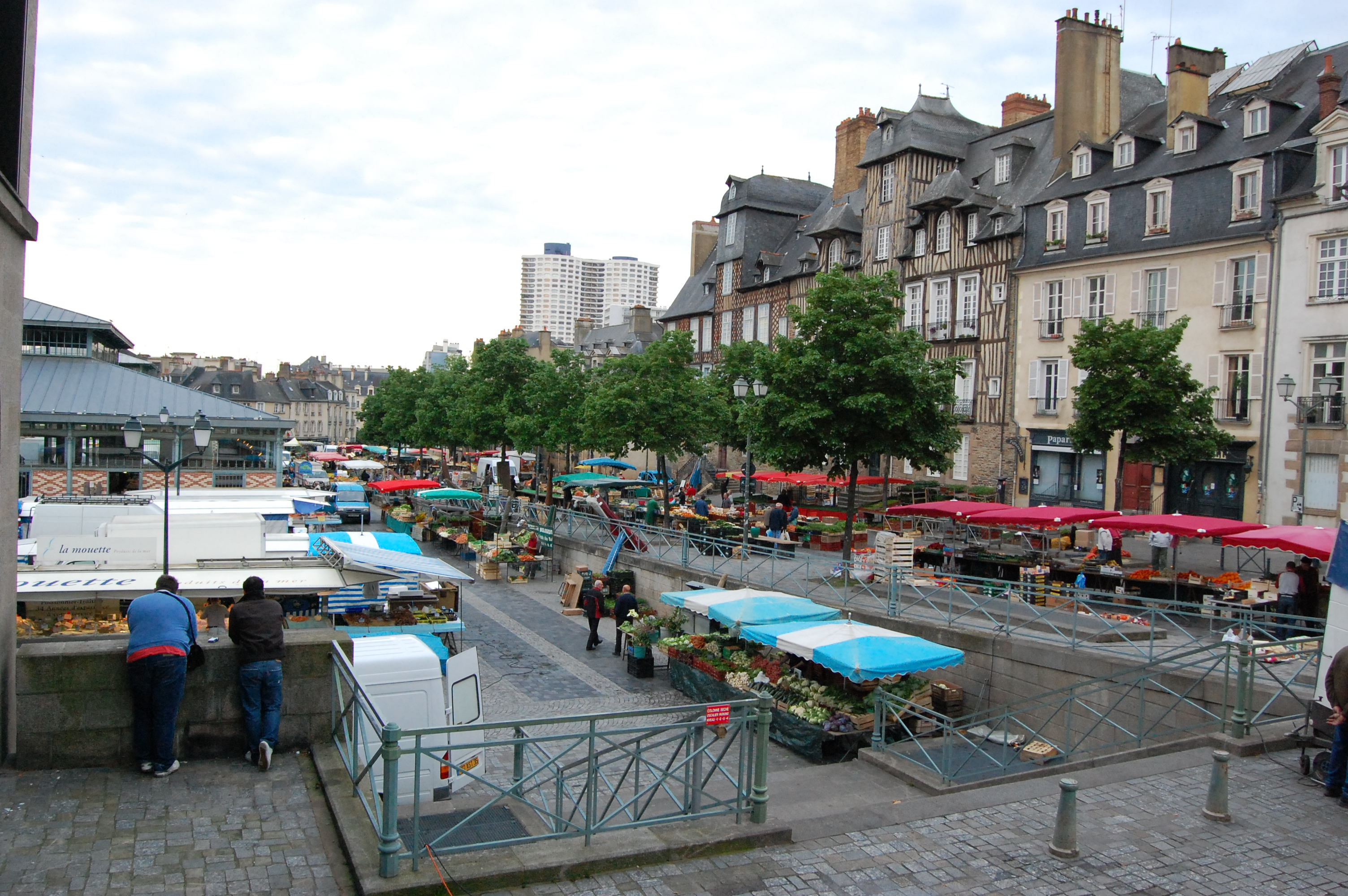
Rennes

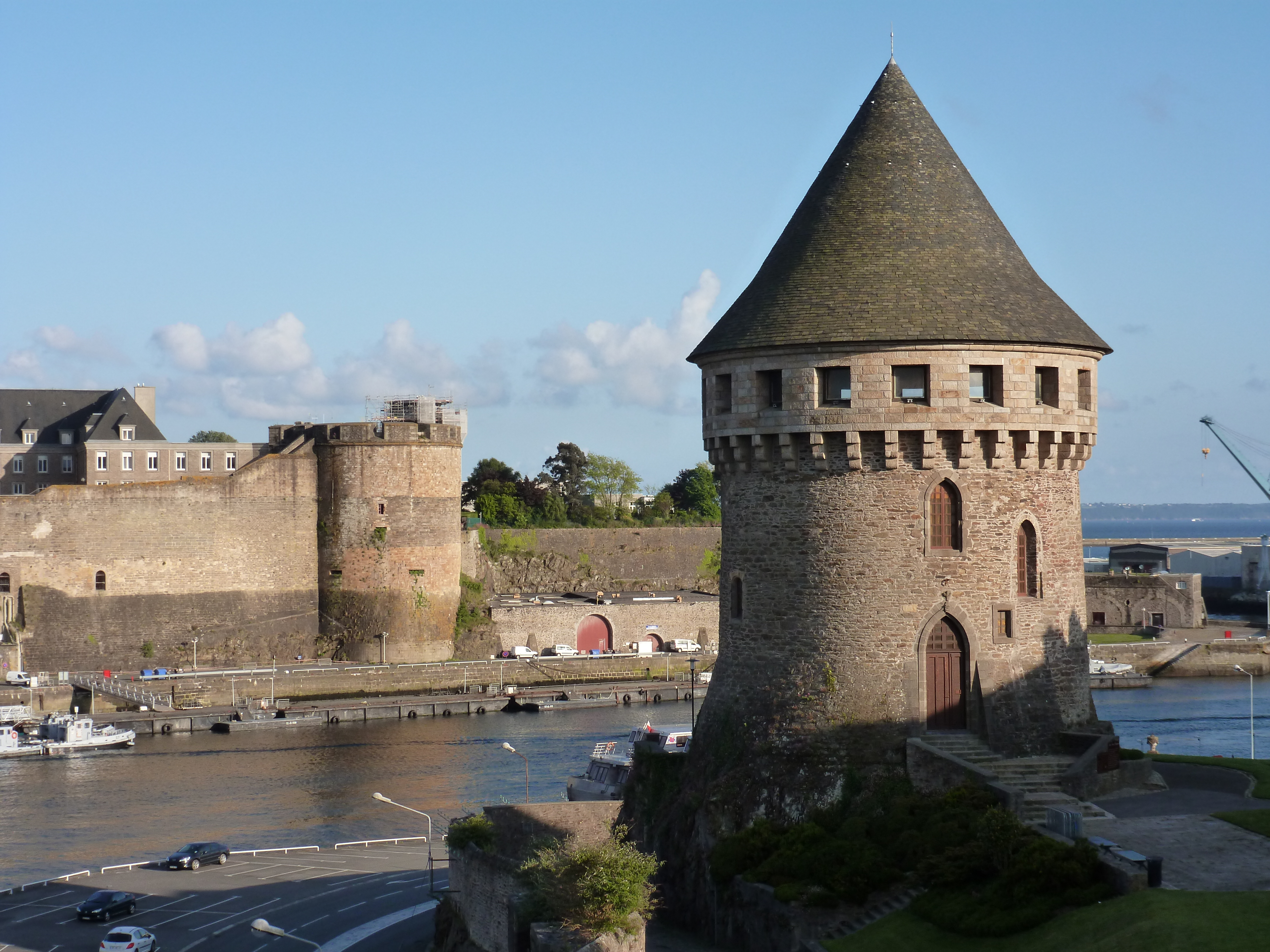
Brest

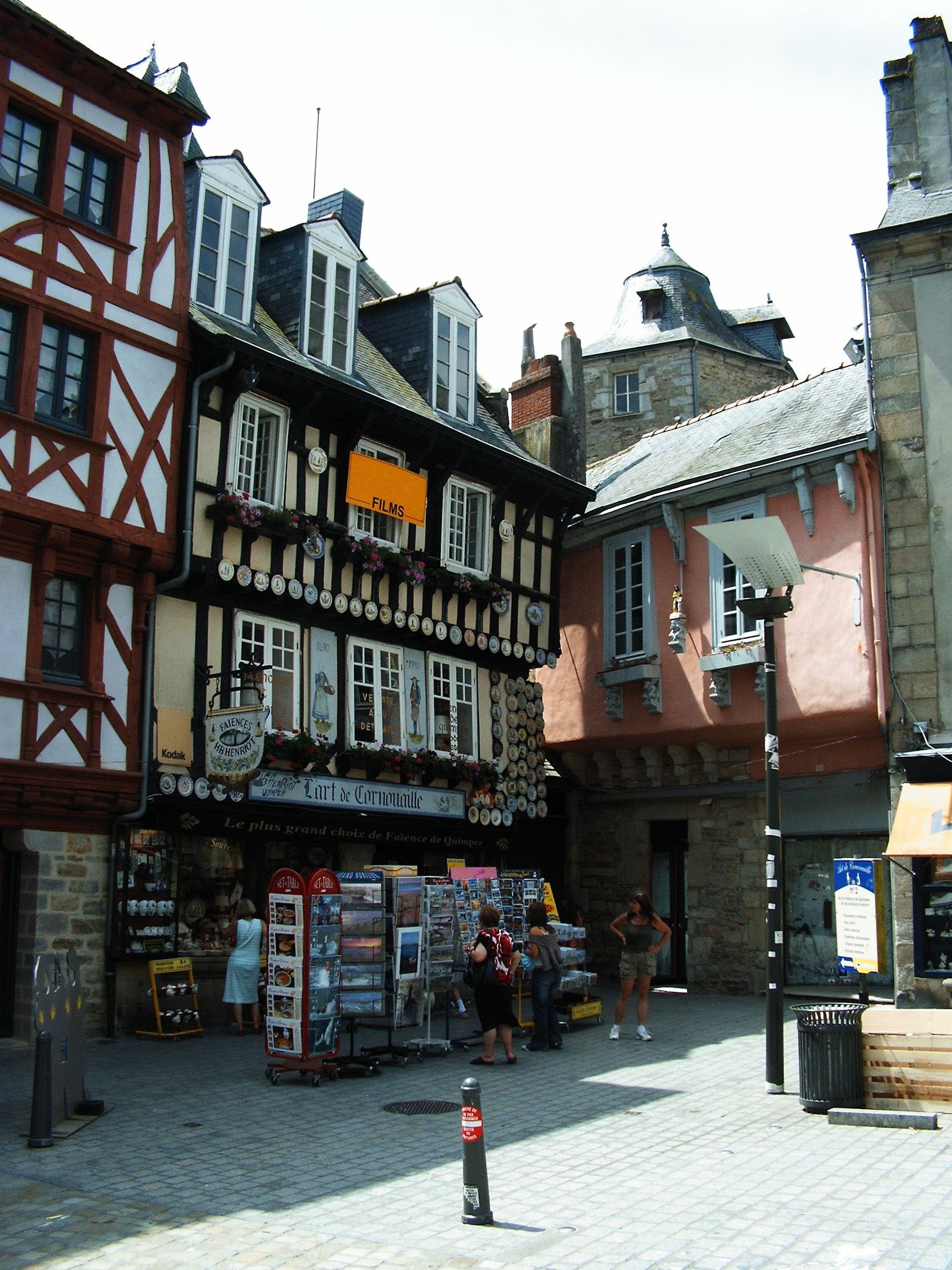
Quimper

=== Departments ===
Brittany comprises four departments: Côtes-d'Armor, Finistère, Ille-et-Vilaine, and Morbihan.

=== Major communities ===
The following table is the list of communes in Brittany with a population over 15,000 inhabitants. Rennes is situated in the east of Brittany, being the capital of the region, the capital of the Ille-et-Vilaine department, as well as the most populous metropolitan area in Brittany with 700,000 inhabitants (2013).

Commune	Breton name	Population (2021)	Department
Rennes	Roazhon	225,081	Ille-et-Vilaine
Brest	Brest	139,619	Finistère
Quimper	Kemper	63,642	Finistère
Lorient	An Oriant	57,149	Morbihan
Vannes	Gwened	53,352	Morbihan
Saint-Malo	Sant-Maloù	46,097	Ille-et-Vilaine
Saint-Brieuc	Sant-Brieg	44,372	Côtes-d'Armor
Lanester	Lannarstêr	22,728	Morbihan
Fougères	Felger	20,418	Ille-et-Vilaine
Lannion	Lannuon	19,880	Côtes-d'Armor
Concarneau	Konk Kerne	19,050	Finistère
Bruz	Bruz	18,266	Ille-et-Vilaine
Vitré	Gwitreg	18,037	Ille-et-Vilaine
Plœmeur	Plañvour	17,853	Morbihan
Cesson-Sévigné	Saozon-Sevigneg	17,526	Ille-et-Vilaine
Lamballe-Armor	Lambal-Arvor	16,578	Côtes-d'Armor
Landerneau	Landerne	15,781	Finistère
Hennebont	Henbont	15,678	Morbihan

=== Climate ===
The Atlantic Ocean and the English Channel provide Brittany with an oceanic climate. Prevailing northwest winds reduce variations of temperature in the region. The climate is drier in southern sections. The extreme northwest has up to 10 days with temperatures above 25 °C, while southeastern Brittany can have up to 50.

== Language and culture ==
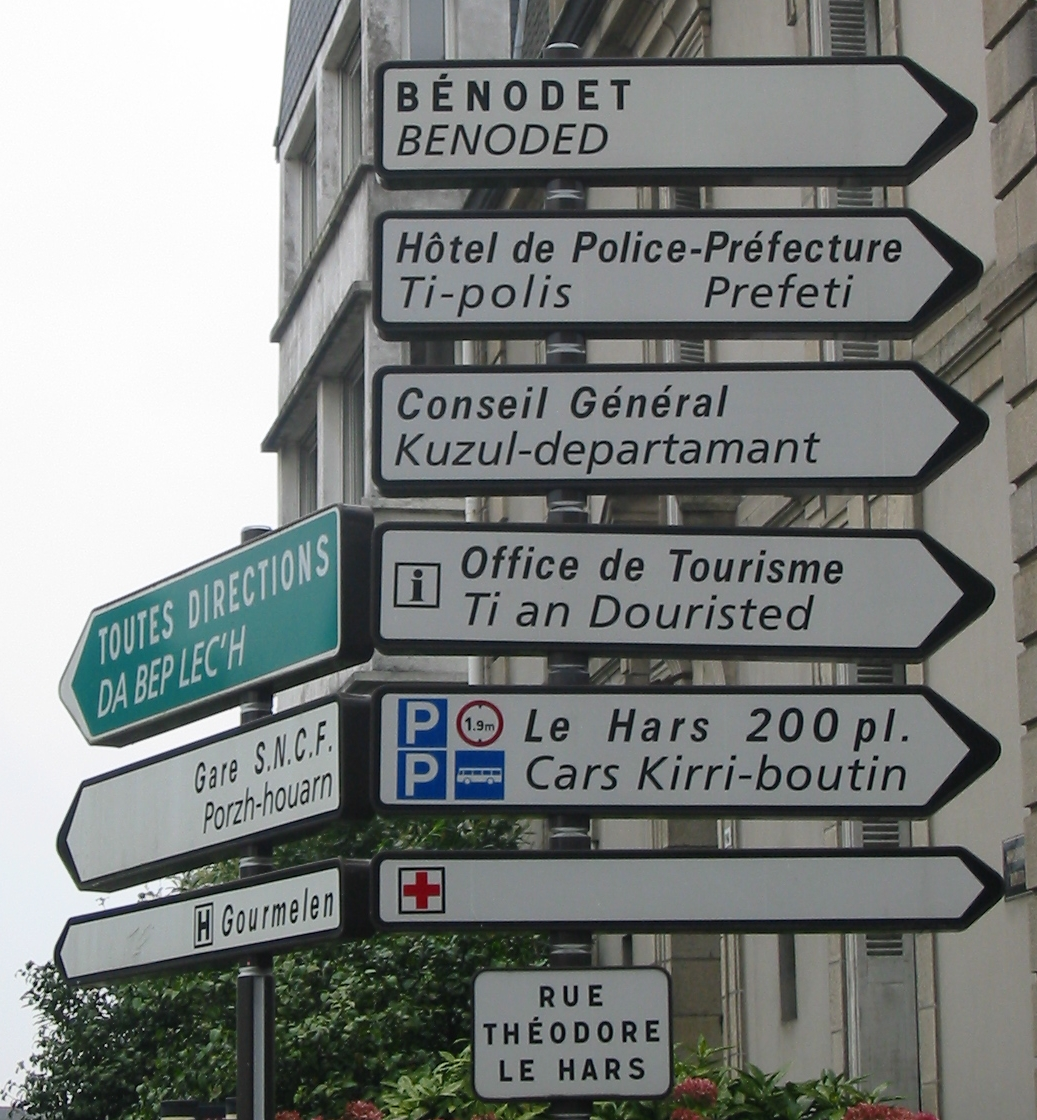
Bilingual road signs in Quimper (French on top)

The name of Brittany derives from settlers from Great Britain, who fled the island in the wake of the Anglo-Saxon invasions of England between the fifth and seventh centuries. Unlike the rest of France and Brittany, Lower Brittany (roughly, west of a boundary from Saint Brieuc to Vannes) has maintained a distinctly Celtic language, Breton, which is related to Cornish and Welsh. It was the dominant language in Lower, or western, Brittany until the mid-20th century. It has been granted regional language status and revival efforts are underway. In Upper, or eastern, Brittany, the traditional language is Gallo, an Oïl language, which has also received regional recognition and is in the process of being revived.

Breton is used on Regional Council of Brittany logo

The French administration now allows for some Breton or Gallo to be used by the region and its communes, in road signs and names of towns and cities, alongside the official French language version. The two regional languages are also taught in some schools, and many folklore associations and clubs are trying to revive them.

Brittany has historically been a stronghold of the Roman Catholic Church, and its rates of church attendance have tended to be considerably higher than the national average. However, in recent years the influence of the church has declined.

== Politics ==
Presidential runoff elections results
Year	National winner	Runner-up
2017	75.36% 1,301,226	24.64% 425,462
2012	56.35% 1,075,919	43.65% 833,346
2007	47.38% 921,256	52.62% 1,023,056
2002	88.56% 1,523,388	11.44% 196,712
1995	50.44% 858,100	49.56% 843,169
1988	55.10% 929,363	44.90% 757,417
1981	48.95% 796,769	51.05% 831,034
1974	56.54% 781,563	43.46% 600,678
1969	63.95% 692,280	36.05% 390,240
1965	63.15% 806,958	36.85% 470,839

The Region of Brittany is administered by the Regional Council of Brittany.

The region was a traditionally conservative and Christian democratic region, with the notable exception of the department of Côtes-d'Armor, a longtime stronghold of the political left. However, the whole of Brittany has recently been moving towards the left, in 2004 electing Jean-Yves Le Drian as its first Socialist regional president, and in the 2007 presidential election voting for Socialist Ségolène Royal. The centrist candidate François Bayrou also polled relatively highly in the region and Fougères elected a MoDem deputy to the National Assembly (he has since joined the pro-UMP New Centre). The French Communist Party's support is largely concentrated in the southwest of the Côtes-d'Armor and northwest of Morbihan. The Greens and other environmentalist parties have traditionally been strong in the region, especially in urban areas such as Rennes or Quimper. The region was one of the few which voted "Yes" to the European constitution in the 2005 referendum, and Brittany continues, along with Alsace, to be a strongly pro-European region.

The Socialist Party controls three departmental councils (Ille-et-Vilaine, Côtes-d'Armor, and Finistère), while the centrist MoDem controls that of Morbihan, in a coalition with the right.

== Economy ==
The gross domestic product (GDP) of the region was 99.5 billion euros in 2018, accounting for 4.2% of French economic output. GDP per capita adjusted for purchasing power was 26,700 euros or 89% of the EU27 average in the same year. The GDP per employee was 100% of the EU average.

== Transport ==
There are several airports in Brittany (Rennes, Brest, Lorient...) serving destinations in Europe. TGV train services link the region with cities such as Paris in 1h27m due to the LGV Bretagne-Pays de la Loire, Lyon, Lille and the largest French cities. TER Bretagne is the regional rail network serving Brittany in order to link the cities of Brittany to each other. OUIBUS coach services link the region with the largest cities in France at low cost. In addition there is Brittany Ferries that take passengers, vehicles and freight to Ireland, the United Kingdom, Spain and Condor Ferries to the Channel Islands.

== Sport ==
Three Breton clubs play in Ligue 1, the top tier of French football: Stade Rennais, Stade Brestois, and FC Lorient. Another historical club, En Avant Guingamp, plays in Ligue 2, and Vannes OC plays in the third tier Championnat National. In rugby union, RC Vannes currently plays in the second level, Pro D2.

The Brest Albatros Hockey is a Brest ice hockey club that plays in FFHG Division 1. The Cesson Rennes Métropole Handball plays in LNH Division 1. The Brest Bretagne Handball plays in French Women's Handball Championship. The Rennes Volley 35 plays in Ligue B. The Fortuneo–Vital Concept cycling pro team participate every year at the Tour de France, the Bretagne Classic, and the Route Adélie de Vitré. Gaelic games are also increasingly popular in the region, particularly Gaelic football where the region has multiple teams that compete in Gaelic Games Europe.

== See also ==
- Breton language
- Breton people
- Brittany (cultural region)
- Politics of Brittany
