= Results of the 2024 French legislative election in Loire-Atlantique =

Following the first round of the 2024 French legislative election on 30 June 2024, runoff elections in each constituency where no candidate received a vote share greater than 50 percent were scheduled for 7 July. Candidates permitted to stand in the runoff elections needed to either come in first or second place in the first round or achieve more than 12.5 percent of the votes of the entire electorate (as opposed to 12.5 percent of the vote share due to low turnout).

== Loire-Atlantique ==
=== 1st constituency ===
Candidate	Party or alliance		First round		Second round	
Candidate	Party or alliance		Votes	%	Votes	%
Karim Benbrahim	New Popular Front	Socialist Party	23,671	43.20	24,963	46.16
Mounir Belhamiti	Ensemble	Renaissance	20,488	37.39	20,610	38.11
Bryan Pecqueur	National Rally		9,937	18.13	8,501	15.72
Hélène Defrance	Far-left	Lutte Ouvrière	521	0.95		
Betty Collober	Far-left	New Anticapitalist Party	181	0.33		
Total			54,798	100.00	54,074	100.00
Valid votes			54,798	97.55	54,074	98.08
Invalid votes			181	0.32	148	0.27
Blank votes			1,193	2.12	910	1.65
Total votes			56,172	100.00	55,132	100.00
Registered voters/turnout			77,342	72.63	77,345	71.28

=== 2nd constituency ===
Candidate	Party or alliance		Votes	%
Andy Kerbrat	New Popular Front	La France Insoumise	34,341	51.67
Valérie Oppelt	Ensemble	Renaissance	17,744	26.70
Nolwenn Fer	National Rally		9,157	13.78
Louisa Amrouche	The Republicans		3,893	5.86
Adrien Copros	Volt		786	1.18
Nicolas Bazille	Far-left	Lutte Ouvrière	542	0.82
Nicolas Vabre	Far-left	Lutte Ouvrière	0	0.00
Zora Chignole	Independent		0	0.00
Total			66,463	100.00
Valid votes			66,463	98.37
Invalid votes			266	0.39
Blank votes			832	1.23
Total votes			67,561	100.00
Registered voters/turnout			91,532	73.81

=== 3rd constituency ===
Candidate	Party or alliance		First round		Second round	
Candidate	Party or alliance		Votes	%	Votes	%
Ségolène Amiot	New Popular Front	La France Insoumise	29,285	44.56	32,216	50.13
Matthieu Annereau	Ensemble	Renaissance	16,135	24.55	18,099	28.16
Laurie Arc	National Rally		13,425	20.43	13,946	21.70
Sophie Van Goethem	The Republicans		4,143	6.30		
Gildas Perrot	Regionalists	Independent	1,896	2.89		
Hélène Dolidon	Far-left	Lutte Ouvrière	832	1.27		
Total			65,716	100.00	64,261	100.00
Valid votes			65,716	98.31	64,261	97.22
Invalid votes			315	0.47	262	0.40
Blank votes			817	1.22	1,574	2.38
Total votes			66,848	100.00	66,097	100.00
Registered voters/turnout			97,389	68.64	97,410	67.85

=== 4th constituency ===
Candidate	Party or alliance		First round		Second round	
Candidate	Party or alliance		Votes	%	Votes	%
Julie Laernoes	New Popular Front	The Ecologists	30,619	46.83	34,265	53.40
Aude Amadou	Ensemble	Renaissance	14,815	22.66	16,225	25.29
Gaëlle Pineau	National Rally		13,116	20.06	13,678	21.32
Astrid Lusson	Miscellaneous right	The Republicans	5,450	8.34		
Stéphane Pellegrini	Far-left	Lutte Ouvrière	788	1.21		
François Olléon	Ecologists	Independent	593	0.91		
Mattis Gauvin	Far-left	Independent	0	0.00		
Total			65,381	100.00	64,168	100.00
Valid votes			65,381	97.89	64,168	97.51
Invalid votes			423	0.63	421	0.64
Blank votes			984	1.47	1,216	1.85
Total votes			66,788	100.00	65,805	100.00
Registered voters/turnout			93,228	71.64	93,258	70.56

=== 5th constituency ===
Candidate	Party or alliance		First round		Second round	
Candidate	Party or alliance		Votes	%	Votes	%
Fabrice Roussel	New Popular Front	La France Insoumise	34,673	37.73	36,774	39.91
Sarah El Hairy	Ensemble	Democratic Movement	33,241	36.17	34,441	37.38
Bruno Comby	Union of the far right	The Republicans	22,722	24.73	20,918	22.70
Emmanuelle Clopeau	Far-left	Lutte Ouvrière	1,261	1.37		
Total			91,897	100.00	92,133	100.00
Valid votes			91,897	97.38	92,133	97.75
Invalid votes			649	0.69	478	0.51
Blank votes			1,820	1.93	1,642	1.74
Total votes			94,366	100.00	94,253	100.00
Registered voters/turnout			127,978	73.74	128,010	73.63

=== 6th constituency ===
Candidate	Party or alliance		First round		Second round	
Candidate	Party or alliance		Votes	%	Votes	%
Jean-Claude Raux	New Popular Front	The Ecologists	26,919	34.16	32,186	41.61
Julio Pichon	National Rally		25,886	32.85	24,745	31.99
Alain Hunault	Miscellaneous right		22,993	29.18	20,413	26.39
Fannie Lejau	Sovereigntist right	Independent	1,671	2.12		
Marie-Paule Catheline	Far-left	Lutte Ouvrière	1,325	1.68		
Total			78,794	100.00	77,344	100.00
Valid votes			78,794	96.69	77,344	97.26
Invalid votes			778	0.95	555	0.70
Blank votes			1,919	2.35	1,628	2.05
Total votes			81,491	100.00	79,527	100.00
Registered voters/turnout			117,288	69.48	117,326	67.78

=== 7th constituency ===
Candidate	Party or alliance		First round		Second round	
Candidate	Party or alliance		Votes	%	Votes	%
Sandrine Josso	Ensemble	Democratic Movement	23,489	32.86	48,531	59.95
Michel Hunault	Union of the far right	The Republicans	23,210	32.47	32,425	40.05
Véronique Mahé	New Popular Front	Communist Party	19,881	27.81		
Bertrand Plouvier	The Republicans		660	0.92		
Gaël Bourdeau	Sovereigntist right	Debout la France	1,595	2.23		
Sophie Corbin	Reconquête		1,426	1.99		
Marie-France Belin	Far-left	Lutte Ouvrière	1,228	1.72		
Total			71,489	100.00	80,956	100.00
Valid votes			71,489	95.81	80,956	94.40
Invalid votes			646	0.87	1,052	1.23
Blank votes			2,478	3.32	3,751	4.37
Total votes			74,613	100.00	85,759	100.00
Registered voters/turnout			118,946	62.73	118,692	72.25

=== 8th constituency ===
Candidate	Party or alliance		First round		Second round	
Candidate	Party or alliance		Votes	%	Votes	%
Matthias Tavel	New Popular Front	La France Insoumise	18,317	30.99	32,922	61.68
Gauthier Bouchet	National Rally		17,065	28.87	20,454	38.32
Audrey Dufeu	Ensemble	Renaissance	11,991	20.28		
Xavier Perrin	Miscellaneous left	Socialist Party	8,327	14.09		
Florence Beuvelet	The Republicans		2,525	4.27		
Eddy Le Beller	Far-left	Lutte Ouvrière	890	1.51		
Total			59,115	100.00	53,376	100.00
Valid votes			59,115	97.79	53,376	88.94
Invalid votes			392	0.65	1,634	2.72
Blank votes			945	1.56	5,002	8.33
Total votes			60,452	100.00	60,012	100.00
Registered voters/turnout			91,147	66.32	91,169	65.83

=== 9th constituency ===
Candidate	Party or alliance		First round		Second round	
Candidate	Party or alliance		Votes	%	Votes	%
Jean-Michel Brard	Ensemble	Miscellaneous right	29,952	32.63	56,024	62.86
Bastian Maldiney	National Rally		29,841	32.51	33,106	37.14
Hélène Macon	New Popular Front	La France Insoumise	24,197	26.36		
Annie Le Gal la Salle	Ecologists	Independent	2,713	2.96		
Aurore Papot	Sovereigntist right	Debout la France	1,636	1.78		
Laurent Chomard	Reconquête		1,209	1.32		
Eddy Le Beller	Far-left	Lutte Ouvrière	1,134	1.24		
Yannis Bizien	Regionalists	Independent	1,122	1.22		
Total			91,804	100.00	89,130	100.00
Valid votes			91,804	97.02	89,130	94.44
Invalid votes			875	0.92	1,207	1.28
Blank votes			1,943	2.05	4,045	4.29
Total votes			94,622	100.00	94,382	100.00
Registered voters/turnout			132,667	71.32	132,667	71.14

=== 10th constituency ===
Candidate	Party or alliance		First round		Second round	
Candidate	Party or alliance		Votes	%	Votes	%
Sophie Errante	Ensemble	Renaissance	27,555	30.57	38,983	42.94
Maxime Viancin	New Popular Front	La France Insoumise	25,055	27.80	25,973	28.61
Stéphanie Cotrel	National Rally		23,574	26.16	25,826	28.45
Xavier Rineau	The Republicans		8,889	9.86		
Bruno Chevalier	Miscellaneous left	Federation of the Republican Left (Note: Dissident who ran without the support of the New Popular Front)	2,947	3.27		
Jacques Cousin	Sovereigntist right	Independent	1,211	1.34		
Emmanuèle Gardair	Far-left	Lutte Ouvrière	893	0.99		
Total			90,124	100.00	90,782	100.00
Valid votes			90,124	97.25	90,782	97.00
Invalid votes			744	0.80	709	0.76
Blank votes			1,807	1.95	2,097	2.24
Total votes			92,675	100.00	93,588	100.00
Registered voters/turnout			126,331	73.36	126,356	74.07
