= Marie-Françoise Clergeau =

French politician

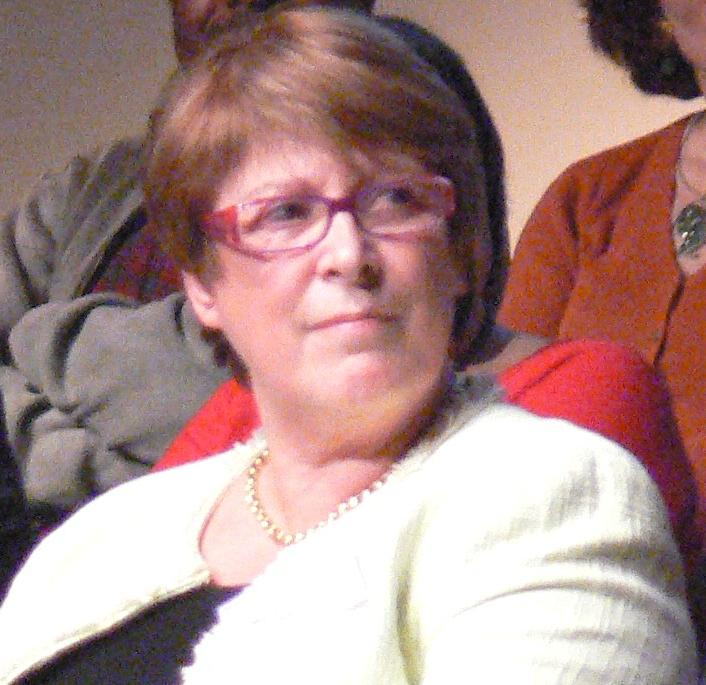
- Clergeau in 2008.

Member of the French Parliament for Loire-Atlantique's 2nd constituency
- In office 12 June 1997 – 20 June 2017
- Preceded by: Élisabeth Hubert
- Succeeded by: Valérie Oppelt

Personal details
- Born: 2 May 1948 (age 77) Nantes, France
- Party: French; Socialist Party; EU; Party of European Socialists
- Children: Christophe Clergeau (son)

Marie-Françoise Clergeau (French pronunciation: [maʁi fʁɑ̃swaz klɛʁʒo]; born 2 May 1948 in Nantes) was a member of the National Assembly of France. She represented Loire-Atlantique's 2nd constituency from 1997 to 2017, as a member of the Socialiste, radical, citoyen et divers gauche. On 29 January 2013 she was a major speaker on to the French National Assembly urging the vote for Marriage Equality.

== Biography ==
Deputy List of mayors of Nantes from 1989 to 2012, then a simple city councilor from 2012 to 2014, she was elected to the National Assembly for the first time for the 11th legislature (1997-2002), defeating Élisabeth Hubert, former Minister of Health under Alain Juppé, in the 2nd constituency of Loire-Atlantique. She was narrowly re-elected as a deputy, with a 324-vote lead, on June 16, 2002, in an election she won against François Pinte (d) (UMP). She was re-elected for a third consecutive term in the second round of the legislative elections on June 17, 2007, again against François Pinte, with 54.76% of the vote. She was then re-elected for a fourth term against Laurence Garnier (UMP) in the second round of the legislative elections on June 17, 2012, with 62.22% of the vote.

A member of the Socialist Party, she became a quaestor of the Assembly on June 27, 2012, then first quaestor on July 22, 2016, following the resignation of Bernard Roman.

She will not be standing for re-election in the June 2017 legislative elections.

She is the mother of three children, two daughters and a son,Christophe Clergeau, who was the Socialist Vice President of the Pays de la Loire Regional Council until 2015 and has been the leader of the opposition in that assembly since then. He will become a Member of the European Parliament in June 2023.
