= Yannick Haury =

French politician

Deputy for Loire-Atlantique's 9th constituency in the National Assembly of France
- In office 20 June 2017 – 9 June 2024
- Preceded by: Monique Rabin
- Succeeded by: Jean-Michel Brard
- Parliamentary group: Democratic Movement

Personal details
- Born: June 12, 1954 (age 71)

Yannick Haury (French pronunciation: [janik oʁi]; born 12 June 1954) is a French politician representing the Democratic Movement. He was elected to the French National Assembly on 18 June 2017, representing the 9th constituency of the department of Loire-Atlantique.

Haury is a certified pharmacist and ran a pharmacy in Saint-Brevin-les-Pins with his wife for 30 years.
