= Loire-Atlantique's 6th constituency =

Constituency of the National Assembly of France

6th constituency of Loire-Atlantique
- inline Constituency of the National Assembly of France

- Constituency in Department

- Location of Loire-Atlantique in France
- Deputy: Jean-Claude Raux; T44
- Department: Loire-Atlantique
- Cantons: Blain, Châteaubriant, Derval, Guéméné-Penfao, Moisdon-la-Rivière, Nort-sur-Erdre, Nozay, Rougé, Saint-Julien-de-Vouvantes

The 6th constituency of Loire-Atlantique is a French legislative constituency in the Loire-Atlantique département. Like the other 576 French constituencies, it elects one MP using the two-round system, with a run-off if no candidate receives over 50% of the vote in the first round.

== Historic representation ==
Election	Member	Party
1988	Xavier Hunault	UDF
1993	Michel Hunault	RPR
1997	Michel Hunault	RPR
2002	Michel Hunault	UMP
2004	Michel Hunault	UDF
2007	Michel Hunault	NC
2012	Yves Daniel	PS
2017	Yves Daniel	LREM
2022	Jean-Claude Raux	T44
2024	Jean-Claude Raux	T44

== Election results ==
=== 2024 ===
Candidate	Party	Alliance	First round			Second round		
Candidate	Party	Alliance	Votes	%	+/–	Votes	%	+/–
Jean-Claude Raux	T44	NFP	26,919	34.16	+1.39	32,186	40.06	-12.83
Julio Pichon	RN		25,886	32.85	+15.64	27,738	34.53	new
Alain Hunault	DVD		22,993	29.18	new	20,413	25.41	new
Fannie Lejau	DIV		1,671	2.12	new			
Marie-Paule Catheline	LO		1,325	1.68	+0.32			
Votes			78,794	100.00		80,337	100.00	
Valid votes			78,794	96.69	-0.50	80,337	97.35	+4.89
Blank votes			1,919	2.35	+0.32	1,628	1.97	-3.13
Null votes			778	0.95	+0.17	555	0.67	-1.77
Turnout			81,491	69.48	+21.15	82,520	70.33	+22.71
Abstentions			35,797	30.52	-21.15	34,806	29.67	-22.71
Registered voters			117,288			117,326		
Result			T44 HOLD					

=== 2022 ===
Legislative Election 2022: Loire-Atlantique's 6th constituency
Party	Candidate	Votes	%	±%
T44 (NUPÉS)	Jean-Claude Raux	17,755	32.77	+12.80
LREM (Ensemble)	Jordan Esnault	13,649	25.19	-14.74
RN	Teddy Bougot	9,324	17.21	+7.21
LR (UDC)	Francois Guyot	5,179	9.56	−12.04
LREM	François-Xavier Le Hecho*	2,108	3.89	N/A
REC	Sandra Bureau	1,912	3.53	N/A
LMR	Catherine Laille	1,624	3.00	N/A
Others	N/A	2,637	4.87	
Turnout		54,188	48.33	−5.20
2nd round result
T44 (NUPÉS)	Jean-Claude Raux	26,874	52.89	N/A
LREM (Ensemble)	Jordan Esnault	23,939	47.11	−14.68
Turnout		50,813	47.62	+3.72
T44 gain from LREM				

* LREM dissident

=== 2017 ===
Candidate	Label	First round		Second round	
Candidate	Label	Votes	%	Votes	%
Yves Daniel	LREM	22,921	39.93	26,420	61.79
Alain Hunault	LR	12,400	21.60	16,338	38.21
Brigitte Maillet	FI	8,156	14.21		
Brigitte Nedelec	FN	5,743	10.00		
Gérard Poisson	PS	3,308	5.76		
Sandra Bureau	DVD	1,445	2.52		
Jacky Flippot	REG	748	1.30		
Bruno Chevalier	DVG	655	1.14		
Antoine Lépine	DVD	609	1.06		
Anne Cadorel-Quétier	REG	562	0.98		
Marie-Louise Dupas	EXG	551	0.96		
Florence Thomas	DIV	309	0.54		
Votes		57,407	100.00	42,758	100.00
Valid votes		57,407	97.28	42,758	88.36
Blank votes		1,111	1.88	3,990	8.24
Null votes		495	0.84	1,645	3.40
Turnout		59,013	53.53	48,393	43.90
Abstentions		51,220	46.47	61,836	56.10
Registered voters		110,233		110,229	
Source: Ministry of the Interior

=== 2012 ===
2012 legislative election in Loire-Atlantique's 6th constituency
Candidate	Party	First round		Second round	
Candidate	Party	Votes	%	Votes	%
Yves Daniel	PS	22,252	34.78%	32,922	52.69%
Michel Hunault	NC	20,777	32.48%	29,559	47.31%
Xavier Renaud	FN	6,578	10.28%		
Yves Aubry	EELV	3,414	5.34%		
Nathalie Poirier	PCD	3,340	5.22%		
Laurent David	FG	3,245	5.07%		
Bruno Chevalier	MRC	1,211	1.89%		
Hervé Madouas	MoDem	981	1.53%		
Jonathan Guillaume	Breizhistance	703	1.10%		
Pascal Le Pautremat	DLR	608	0.95%		
Anne Lavielle	MEI	532	0.83%		
Christophe Helou	LO	333	0.52%		
Valid votes		63,974	97.85%	62,481	96.67%
Spoilt and null votes		1,403	2.15%	2,150	3.33%
Votes cast / turnout		65,377	61.15%	64,631	60.46%
Abstentions		41,544	38.85%	42,276	39.54%
Registered voters		106,921	100.00%	106,907	100.00%

=== 2007 ===
Legislative Election 2007:
Party	Candidate	Votes	%	±%
NM	Michel Hunault	23,569	48.49	
PS	Pascal Bioret	14,505	29.84	
MoDem	Donatienne Menager	1,894	3.90	
LV	Isabelle Verdon	1,834	3.77	
Far left	Nadine Bouchard	1,115	2.29	
FN	Jean-Claude Kerhir	1,027	2.11	
CPNT	Fabrice Sanchez	1,020	2.10	
Others	N/A	3,642		
Turnout		49,732	64.39	
2nd round result
NM	Michel Hunault	25,086	53.86	
PS	Pascal Bioret	21,490	46.14	
Turnout		47,651	61.70	
NM gain from UMP				

=== 2002 ===
Legislative Election 2002: Loire-Atlantique's 6th constituency
Party	Candidate	Votes	%	±%
UMP	Michel Hunault	23,536	50.49	
PS	Geneviève Chignac	12,708	27.26	
FN	Guillaume Vouzellaud	3,285	7.05	
CPNT	Fabrice Sanchez	1,546	3.32	
LV	Marie-Elisabeth Allaire	1,187	2.55	
LCR	Erwan Moinier	1,083	2.32	
Others	N/A	3,267		
Turnout		47,714	67.17	
UMP hold				

=== 1997 ===
Legislative Election 1997: Loire-Atlantique's 6th constituency
Party	Candidate	Votes	%	±%
RPR	Michel Hunault	19,727	43.85	
PS	Geneviève Chignac	12,706	28.24	
FN	Jean-Jacques Chevalier	4,693	10.43	
PCF	Yves Blais	2,767	6.15	
LV	Anne-Marie Moulinier	2,604	5.79	
DVD	Jacqueline Moncelet	1,754	3.90	
Others	N/A	737		
Turnout		48,114	71.50	
2nd round result
RPR	Michel Hunault	24,865	54.53	
PS	Geneviève Chignac	20,737	45.47	
Turnout		48,297	71.77	
RPR hold				

== References and Sources ==
- Official results of French elections from 1998: "Résultats électoraux officiels en France" (in French). Archived from the original on 20 December 2011.
