= Monique Rabin =

French politician

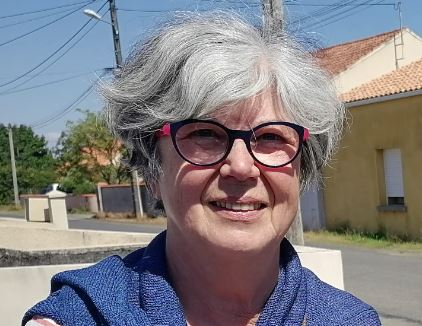
- Monique Rabin

Deputy for Loire-Atlantique's 9th constituency in the National Assembly of France
- In office 20 June 2012 – 20 June 2017
- Preceded by: Philippe Boënnec
- Succeeded by: Yannick Haury
- Parliamentary group: SRC, then SER

Mayor of Saint-Philbert-de-Grand-Lieu
- In office 2008–2014
- Succeeded by: Stéphan Beaugé

Personal details
- Born: July 2, 1954 (age 71) Laval, Mayenne

Monique Rabin (born 2 July 1954) is a French politician. She was the National Assembly deputy for Loire-Atlantique's 9th constituency from 2012 to 2017, as a member of the socialists.

== Political career ==
Before her election, she was a parliamentary assistant to Edmond Hervé, deputy for Ille-et-Vilaine. She was the unsuccessful socialist candidate in 2007 for Loire-Atlantique's 10th constituency in the National assembly.

Rabin was also vice-president of the Pays de la Loire regional council from 2004 to 2012.

From 2008 until 2014, she was mayor of the municipality of Saint-Philbert-de-Grand-Lieu, in Loire-Atlantique. Her election gave rise to a unique politico-media episode in the Pays de Retz: Rabin was elected Mayor of Saint Philbert de Grand Lieu in March 2008 with only two votes ahead of the outgoing mayor Yvonnick Gilet (DVD - UMP) who did not ask for a recount of the votes. However, an action for annulment was immediately filed by Yvonnick Gilet and his running mate with the Nantes administrative court. Of all the grievances filed by Mr. Gilet, nine were rejected by the Government Commissioner. The only point that could lead to the cancellation of the ballot concerned anomalies in taking into account of blank or invalid ballots. Errors noted in particular in polling station number 5, chaired by a running mate of Mr. Gilet. The management of this polling station having been described as "catastrophic" by the court. The paradox of this affair, which the Government Commissioner did not fail to stress: "If this appeal lodged by Mr. Gilet leads to the annulment of the election, it will be because of errors including those of his deputies and / or running mates are, it seems, originally as presidents or assessors of polling stations". The elections of 9 March 2008 were annulled by decision of the administrative court on the grounds of registration errors concerning the spoiled ballots. The new elections which took place on 29 June 2008 saw the victory of the list led by Monique Rabin (59.23%, or 2,311 votes) against that of Yvonnick Gilet (40.77%, or 1,591 votes).

In 2012, Rabin was elected as deputy for Loire-Atlantique's 9th constituency, defeating Philippe Boënnec (UMP) with 53.26% of votes.

In 2014, she was defeated when standing for re-election as mayor of Saint Philbert de Grand Lieu by Stéphan Beaugé, UMP municipal councilor since 2001 and former running mate of Yvonick Gilet in 2008.

She was a member of the Finance, General Economy and Budgetary Monitoring Committee and, with Catherine Vautrin (Republicans), produced the September 2015 report on financing of consular missions.

At the 2017 election, she received 13.3% of votes in the first round, finishing third behind Yannick Haury (MoDem), the winner of the second round, and Claire Hugues (LR).
