= Territories44 =

Territories44 Territoires44
- Abbreviation: T44
- Chairperson: Marie-Alexy Lefeuvre; Olivier Demarty
- Founded: February 2017
- Ideology: Participatory democracy Ecologism; Loire-Atlantique regionalism
- Political position: Left-wing
- National affiliation: New Popular Front
- National Assembly (Loire-Atlantique seats): 1 / 10
- Senate (Loire-Atlantique seats): 1 / 6
- Departmental Council of Loire-Atlantique: 4 / 62

Website
- www.territoires44.fr

Territories44 (French: Territoires44, T44) is a regionalist political movement in the Loire-Atlantique department.

== History ==
Territories44 was founded in February 2017 by a group of elected officials, primarily from rural areas, from the Loire-Atlantique department who wished to present a united voice. They were mostly apolitical elected officials from rural communes who were concerned by the rise of National Rally in the department.

Early members of T44 included Senator Ronan Dantec, departmental councillors, mayors and future deputy Jean-Claude Raux.

By 2020, 15% of mayors in the Loire-Atlantique were members or supported by T44. And, by 2023, T44 was represented in 20% of all municipal councils in the department.

In the 2022 French legislative election, Jean-Claude Raux, the mayor of Saffré, was supported by The Ecologists to be the NUPES candidate for the 6th constituency of Loire-Atlantique. Raux was elected with 52.89% of the vote defeating Jordan Esnault of LREM. Raux was re-elected in 2024 in a three horse race with 40.06%.

== Electoral Results ==
=== National Assembly ===
Election year	Leader	Candidates	1st round votes	%	2nd round votes	%	Seats	+/–
2022 (Note: Within NUPES)	Jean-Claude Raux	1	17,755	0.07%	26,874	0.1%	1 / 577	New
2024 (Note: Within NFP)	Jean-Claude Raux	1	26,919	0.08%	40,06	0.1%	1 / 577	Steady

=== Senate ===
Election year	Leader	Candidates	Votes	%	Seats	+/–
2023 (Note: Supported by Europe Ecology – The Greens and Ensemble sur nos Territoires)	Ronan Dantec	1	947	1.5%	1 / 348	New

=== Departmental Council of Loire-Atlantique ===
Election year	Leader	Candidates	Votes	%	Seats	+/–
2021		4	16,070	5.1%	4 / 62	New
