= Laurence Garnier =

French politician (born 1978)

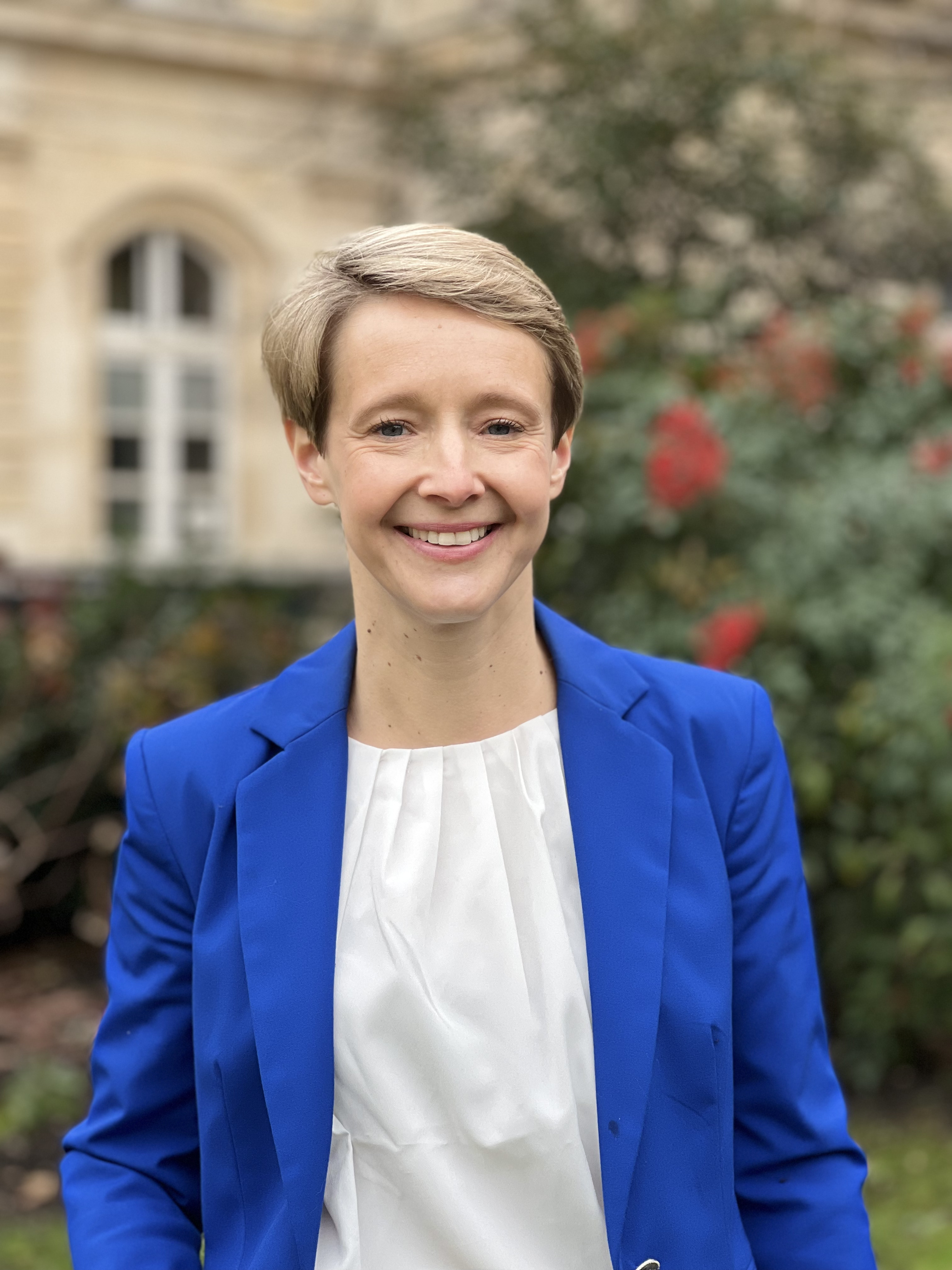
- Garnier in 2022

Secretary of State for Consumption
- In office 21 September 2024 – 23 December 2024
- President: Emmanuel Macron
- Prime Minister: Michel Barnier
- Preceded by: Olivia Grégoire (Delegated Minister)

Member of the Senate
- Incumbent
- Assumed office 1 November 2020
- Preceded by: Christophe Priou
- Constituency: Loire-Atlantique

Personal details
- Born: 3 April 1978 (age 48)
- Party: The Republicans (since 2015); Union for a Popular Movement (2002–2015)

Laurence Garnier (born 3 April 1978) is a French politician of The Republicans (LR) who has been a member of the Senate since 2020. From 2015 to 2020, she was a vice president of the Regional Council of Pays de la Loire.

== Political career ==
In the 2012 legislative election, she was a candidate for Loire-Atlantique's 2nd constituency.

From September to December 2024, Garnier briefly served as Secretary of State for Consumption in the government of Prime Minister Michel Barnier.

== Political positions ==
During her time in the Senate, Garnier has voted against key legislation on LGBTQ+ rights and voiced her opposition to an AIDS prevention campaign in 2016 which featured gay couples.
