= Valérie Oppelt =

French politician

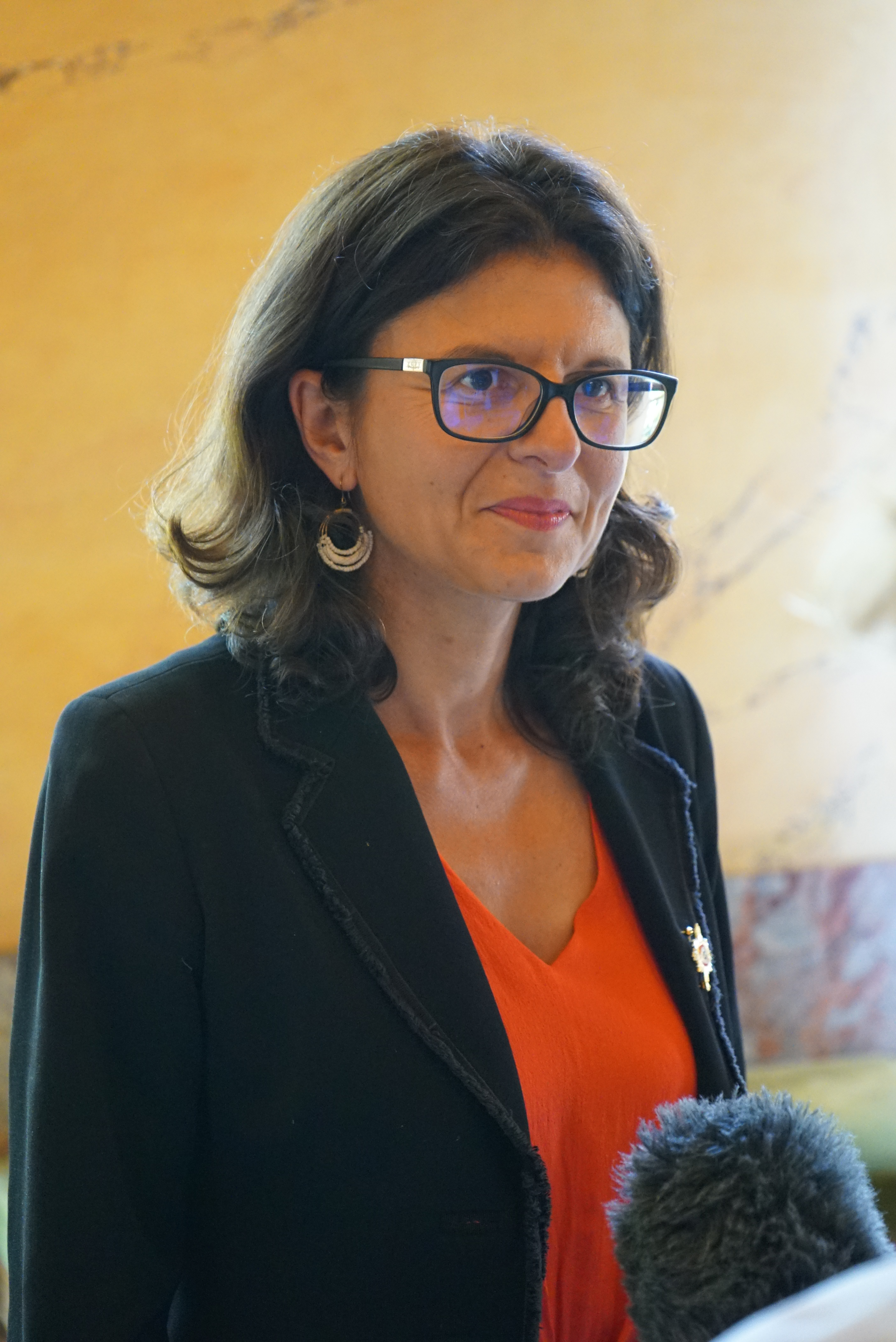

Member of the National Assembly for Loire-Atlantique's 2nd constituency
- In office 21 June 2017 – 21 June 2022
- Preceded by: Marie-Françoise Clergeau
- Succeeded by: Andy Kerbrat

Personal details
- Born: 10 December 1973 (age 52) Nantes, France
- Party: La République En Marche!
- Education: University of Burgundy

Valérie Oppelt (born 10 December 1973) is a French politician of La République En Marche! (LREM) who was elected to the French National Assembly on 18 June 2017, representing the department of Loire-Atlantique.

In parliament, Oppelt served on the Economic Affairs Committee from 2017 until 2019, where she was her parliamentary group's coordinator. From 2019 until 2020, she was a member of the Committee on Legal Affairs. She later joined the Committee on Social Affairs in 2020.

Early in the term, Oppelt and Olivia Grégoire launched an informal group of around 50 LREM members in support of strengthening entrepreneurship. In July 2019, she decided not to align with her parliamentary group's majority and became one of 52 LREM members who abstained from a vote on the French ratification of the European Union's Comprehensive Economic and Trade Agreement (CETA) with Canada.

She lost her seat in the second round of the 2022 French legislative election to Andy Kerbrat from La France Insoumise.
