= Loire-Atlantique's 9th constituency =

Constituency of the National Assembly of France

9th constituency of Loire-Atlantique
- inline Constituency of the National Assembly of France

- Constituency in Department

- Location of Loire-Atlantique in France
- Deputy: Jean-Michel Brard; DVD
- Department: Loire-Atlantique
- Cantons: Bourgneuf-en-Retz, Legé, Machecoul, Paimboeuf, Le Pellerin, Pornic, Saint-Père-en-Retz, Saint-Philbert-de-Grand-Lieu

The 9th constituency of Loire-Atlantique is a French legislative constituency in the Loire-Atlantique département. Like the other 576 French constituencies, it elects one MP using the two-round system, with a run-off if no candidate receives over 50% of the vote in the first round.

== Historic representation ==
Election	Member	Party
1988	Lucien Richard	RPR
1993	Pierre Hériaud	UDF
1997	Pierre Hériaud	UDF
2002	Pierre Hériaud	UMP
2007	Philippe Boënnec	UMP
2012	Monique Rabin	PS
2017	Yannick Haury	LREM
2022	Yannick Haury	RE
2024	Jean-Michel Brard	DVD

== Election results ==
=== 2024 ===
Candidate	Party	Alliance	First round			Second round		
Candidate	Party	Alliance	Votes	%	+/–	Votes	%	+/–
Jean-Michel Brard	DVD	Ensemble	29,952	32.63	+7.04	56,024	62.86	+9.74
Bastian Maldiney	RN		29,841	32.51	+14.84	33,106	37.14	new
Hélène Macon	LFI	NFP	24,197	26.36	-2.24	withdrew		
Annie Le Gal La Salle	ECO		2,713	2.96	new			
Aurore Papot	DLF		1,636	1.78	+0.29			
Laurent Chomard	REC		1,209	1.32	-1.90			
Annie Hervo	LO		1,134	1.24	-0.09			
Yannis Bizien	REG		1,122	1.22	new			
Votes			91,804	100.00		89,130	100.00	
Valid votes			91,804	97.02	-0.66	89,130	94.44	+1.91
Blank votes			1,943	2.05	+0.35	4,045	4.29	-0.86
Null votes			875	0.92	+0.30	1,207	1.28	-1.05
Turnout			94,622	71.32	+20.66	94,382	71.14	+21.62
Abstentions			38,045	28.68	-20.66	38,285	28.86	-21.62
Registered voters			132,667			132,667		
Result			DVD GAIN FROM LREM					

=== 2022 ===
Legislative Election 2022: Loire-Atlantique's 9th constituency
Party	Candidate	Votes	%	±%
LFI (NUPÉS)	Hélène Macon	18,384	28.60	+10.92
LREM (Ensemble)	Yannick Haury	16,449	25.59	-11.31
RN	Bastian Maldiney	11,358	17.67	+7.32
HOR	Paul Brounais*	7,341	11.42	N/A
UDI (UDC)	Alain Le Coz	3,792	5.90	−9.37
REC	Laurent Chomard	2,067	3.22	N/A
LMR	Dominique Pilet	1,660	2.58	N/A
Others	N/A	3,235	5.03	
Turnout		64,286	50.66	−3.58
2nd round result
LREM (Ensemble)	Yannick Haury	31,625	53.12	-11.90
LFI (NUPÉS)	Hélène Macon	27,908	46.88	N/A
Turnout		59,533	49.52	+6.95
LREM gain from MoDem				

=== 2017 ===
Candidate	Label	First round		Second round	
Candidate	Label	Votes	%	Votes	%
Yannick Haury	MoDem	23,096	36.90	28,208	65.02
Claire Hugues	LR	9,560	15.27	15,176	34.98
Monique Rabin	DVG	8,291	13.25		
Jean-Marie Cosson	FI	8,227	13.14		
Jean-Luc Javel	FN	6,478	10.35		
Corine Guignard	ECO	2,379	3.80		
Christophe Grandet	DVG	1,578	2.52		
Christian Boisteau	DLF	932	1.49		
Françoise Godard	PCF	461	0.74		
Annie Hervo	EXG	429	0.69		
Karol Dolu	REG	368	0.59		
Isabelle Marzin	REG	352	0.56		
Lionel Garcia	DIV	279	0.45		
Delphine Boulois	DVG	162	0.26		
Votes		62,592	100.00	43,384	100.00
Valid votes		62,592	97.89	43,384	86.47
Blank votes		886	1.39	5,032	10.03
Null votes		462	0.72	1,759	3.51
Turnout		63,940	54.24	50,175	42.57
Abstentions		53,941	45.76	67,697	57.43
Registered voters		117,881		117,872	
Source: Ministry of the Interior

=== 2012 ===
Legislative Election 2012: Loire-Atlantique's 9th constituency
Party	Candidate	Votes	%	±%
PS	Monique Rabin	25,278	37.99	
UMP	Philippe Boënnec	24,626	37.01	
FN	Marguerite Lussaud	6,239	9.38	
FG	Gauthier Lorthiois	2,683	4.03	
EELV	Mahel Coppey	2,300	3.46	
MoDem	Philippe Fintoni	1,673	2.51	
DVD	Jean-Michel Pollono	1,473	2.21	
Others	N/A	2,266		
Turnout		66,538	61.76	
2nd round result
PS	Monique Rabin	34,799	53.26	
UMP	Philippe Boënnec	30,537	46.74	
Turnout		65,336	60.65	
PS gain from UMP				

=== 2007 ===
Legislative Election 2007: Loire-Atlantique's 9th constituency
Party	Candidate	Votes	%	±%
UMP	Philippe Boënnec	25,748	40.91	
PS	Monique Rabin	17,426	27.68	
MoDem	Alain Guillon	5,806	9.22	
CPNT	Dominique Pilet	2,044	3.25	
Far left	Elise Faucheux	1,883	2.99	
LV	Patricia Cormerais-Dupre	1,778	2.82	
FN	Marguerite Lussaud	1,595	2.53	
DVD	Bernard Revel	1,568	2.49	
DVD	Jean-François Cosse	1,454	2.31	
MPF	Herve Baeulieu	1,349	2.14	
Others	N/A	2,294		
Turnout		64,264	64.61	
2nd round result
UMP	Philippe Boënnec	31,712	53.00	
PS	Monique Rabin	28,121	47.00	
Turnout		61,688	62.02	
UMP hold				

=== 2002 ===
Legislative Election 2002: Loire-Atlantique's 9th constituency
Party	Candidate	Votes	%	±%
UMP	Pierre Hériaud	24,780	44.09	
PS	Monique Rabin	14,360	25.55	
FN	Marguerite Lussaud	4,123	7.34	
CPNT	Jean-Louis Bernie	3,701	6.58	
LV	Patricia Cormerais	2,179	3.88	
MPF	Catherine Beaulieu	1,353	2.41	
LCR	Michel Moinier	1,245	2.21	
Far left	Andree Supiot	1,206	2.15	
Others	N/A	3,262		
Turnout		57,487	66.67	
2nd round result
UMP	Pierre Hériaud	30,001	58.89	
PS	Monique Rabin	20,941	41.11	
Turnout		52,708	61.12	
UMP hold				

=== 1997 ===
Legislative Election 1997: Loire-Atlantique's 9th constituency
Party	Candidate	Votes	%	±%
UDF	Pierre Hériaud	20,949	41.49	
PS	Yannick Lebeaupin	12,966	25.68	
FN	Thierry Monvoisin	5,709	11.31	
DVD	Catherine Dein	3,016	5.97	
PCF	Claudine Morel	2,909	5.76	
DVE	Raymond Leduc	2,318	4.59	
MEI	Jean-Claude Marchand	1,316	2.61	
DIV	Geneviève Bonardel	1,041	2.06	
Others	N/A	263		
Turnout		54,144	71.17	
2nd round result
UDF	Pierre Hériaud	28,550	55.92	
PS	Yannick Lebeaupin	22,508	44.08	
Turnout		54,313	71.40	
UDF hold				

== Sources ==
- Official results of French elections from 1998: "Résultats électoraux officiels en France" (in French). Archived from the original on 20 December 2011.
