= Jean-Michel Brard =

French politician (born 1968)

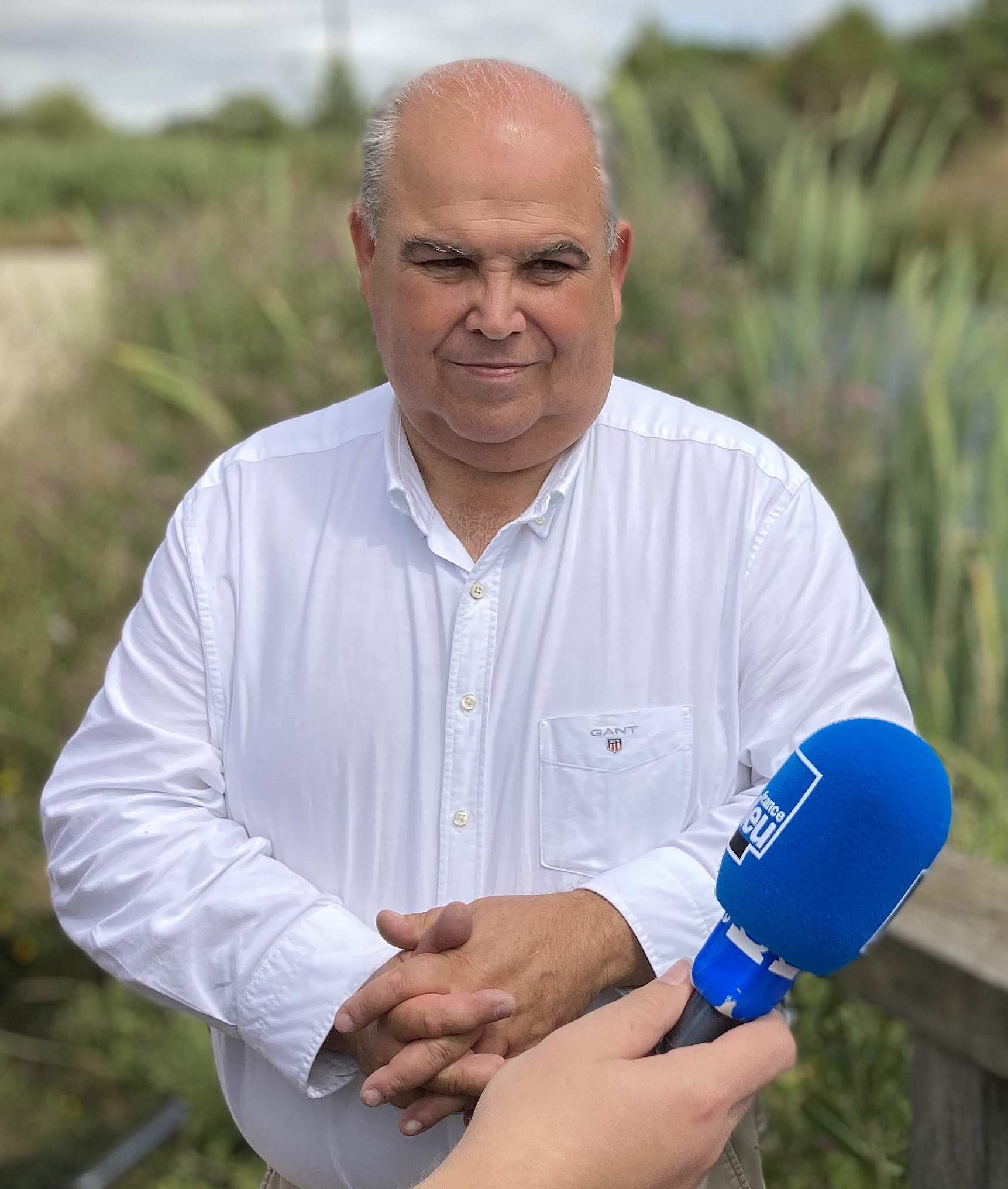
- Jean-Michel Brard in Pornic in 2023

Member of the National Assembly for Loire-Atlantique's 9th constituency
- Incumbent
- Assumed office 8 July 2024
- Preceded by: Yannick Haury

Personal details
- Born: 3 April 1968 (age 58) France
- Party: Miscellaneous right

Jean-Michel Brard (born 3 April 1968) is a French politician. In the 2024 French legislative election, he was elected deputy for Loire-Atlantique's 9th constituency.

== Biography ==
A teacher and then a business leader and trader, he was first elected municipal councilor of Pornic in 1995. In 2014, he succeeded Philippe Boënnec as mayor of Pornic following the 2014 French municipal elections. In the 2020 municipal elections, his list won in the first round and he was re-elected mayor.

Following the dissolution of the National Assembly by Emmanuel Macron and following the withdrawal of the outgoing deputy of Loire-Atlantique's 9th constituency Yannick Haury, for the legislative elections of 2024, he agreed to be a candidate under the miscellaneous right label. He was a candidate backed by the Ensemble coalition.

He came first in the first round ahead of the candidate of the far-right Rassemblement National party. The left-wing candidate, Hélène Macon, withdrew in his favor as part of the Republican Front. He was finally elected deputy in the second round, with nearly 63% of the vote, succeeding Yannick Haury.

== Summary of election results ==
=== Municipal elections ===
The results below only concern the elections in which he is the top candidate.

Year	Shade	Commune	Position	1st round			2nd round			Seats ( CM )
Year	Shade	Commune	Position	Votes	%	Rank	Votes	%	Rank	Seats ( CM )
2014	DVD	Pornic	Head of the list	3,848	44.48	1st	4,058	45.54	1st	25 / 33
2020	DVD	Pornic	Head of the list	4,465	69.60	1st				28 / 33

=== Legislative elections ===
Year	Party	Constituency	1st round			2nd round			Issue
Year	Party	Constituency	Votes	%	Rank	Votes	%	Rank	Issue
2024	DVD	Loire-Atlantique's 9th constituency	29,952	32.63	1st	56,024	62.86	1st	Elected

== See also ==
- List of deputies of the 17th National Assembly of France
