= Sophie Errante =

French politician (born 1971)

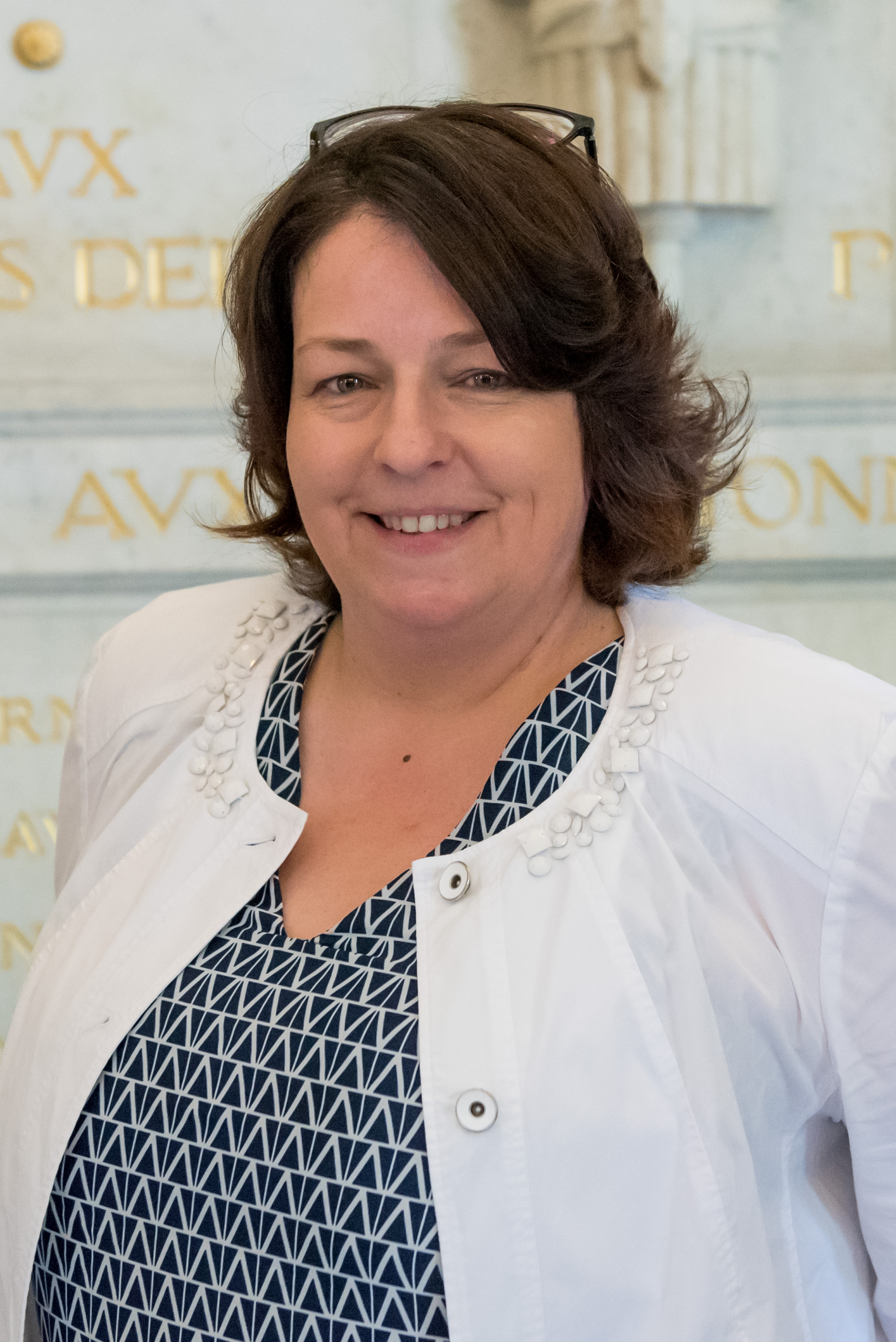
- Sophie Errante in July 2017

Member of the National Assembly for Loire-Atlantique's 10th constituency
- Incumbent
- Assumed office 20 June 2012
- Preceded by: Serge Poignant

Personal details
- Born: 22 July 1971 (age 54) Nantes, France
- Party: Socialist Party; La République En Marche!

Sophie Errante (born 22 July 1971) is a French politician of La République En Marche! (LREM) who has been serving as a member of the French National Assembly since the 2012 elections, representing the department of Loire-Atlantique, first as a socialist, and then from the 2017 elections, as an LREM member.

== Political career ==
In 2012, Errante was the successful socialist candidate for Loire-Atlantique's 10th constituency. For the 2017 election, she moved to LREM.

Following the 2017 legislative election, Errante stood as a candidate for the National Assembly's presidency; in an internal vote within the LREM parliamentary group, she lost against François de Rugy.

In parliament, Errante serves on the Finance Committee. In addition to her committee assignments, she is a member of the French delegation to the Inter-Parliamentary Union (IPU). From 2018 to 2022, she also represented the parliament on the supervisory board of the Deposits and Consignments Fund (CDC).

Since November 2017, Errante has been part of LREM´s executive board under the leadership of the party's successive chairmen Christophe Castaner and Stanislas Guerini.

Following the 2022 legislative election, Errante stood again as a candidate for the National Assembly's presidency; in an internal vote, she lost against Yaël Braun-Pivet.

== Other activities ==
- Caisse des dépôts et consignations, Chair of the Supervisory Board (2018–2022)

== Political positions ==
In July 2019, Errante voted in favor of the French ratification of the European Union’s Comprehensive Economic and Trade Agreement (CETA) with Canada.

== See also ==
- 2017 French legislative election
