= Philippe Boënnec =

French politician

Deputy for Loire-Atlantique's 9th constituency in the National Assembly of France
- In office 2007–2012
- Preceded by: Pierre Hériaud
- Succeeded by: Monique Rabin
- Parliamentary group: UMP

Personal details
- Born: 21 April 1951 (age 74) Nantes

Philippe Boënnec (born 21 April 1951 in Nantes) was a member of the National Assembly of France. He represented Loire-Atlantique's 9th constituency from 2007 to 2012 as a member of the Union for a Popular Movement.

== Biography ==
After obtaining his doctorate from the Faculty of Medicine in Nantes, Philippe Boënnec practiced medicine.

First deputy mayor of Pornic from 1983, he became mayor on January 24, 1993, succeeding Gilbert Pollono, who resigned for health reasons. He became chairman of the supervisory board of the Pays de Retz intermunicipal hospital and of the Hospital Federation of France Pays de la Loire.

He was elected to the National Assembly for the first time on June 17, 2007, in the 9th district of Loire-Atlantique, where he succeeded Pierre Heriaud (outgoing representative) by obtaining 53% of the vote against Monique Rabin (PS). He is a member of the UMP group.

Following his election as a deputy, he had to choose between his positions as city councilor for a town with more than 3,500 inhabitants and general councilor due to the law on multiple mandates. Philippe Boënnec therefore resigned from the Departmental Council of Loire-Atlantique.

Incumbent deputy in the legislative elections of June 17, 2012, during which he called for support from the National Rally and likened same-sex marriage to "a decadent society ". Philippe Boënnec was defeated in the 9th constituency of Loire-Atlantique, where he was succeeded by Monique Rabin (PS), who obtained 53.26% of the votes in the second round.

He did not stand for re-election in the 2014 municipal elections and thus relinquished his last elected offices.
