= Arrondissements of the Loire-Atlantique department =

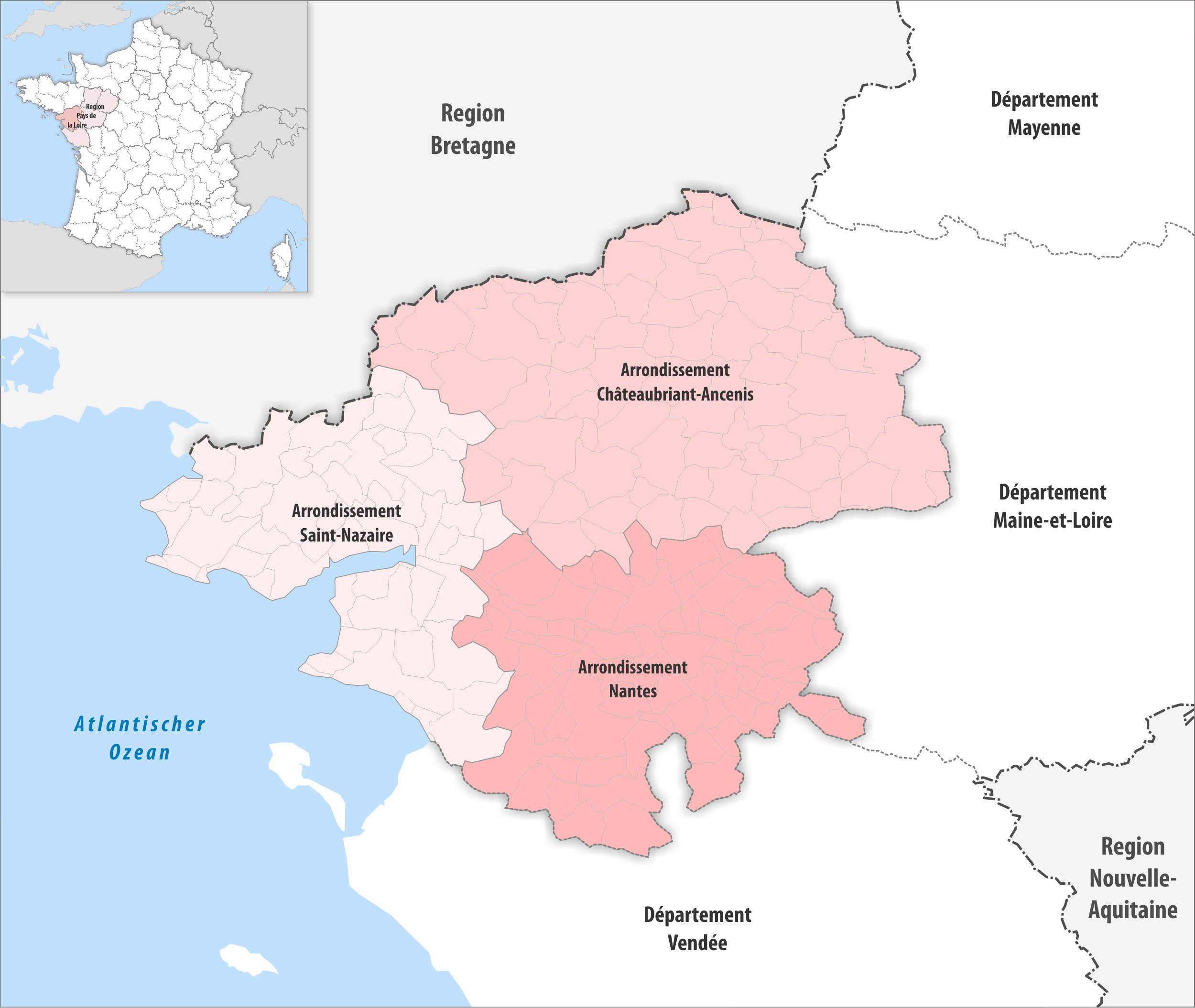
Map of arrondissements of the Loire-Atlantique department.

The 3 arrondissements of the Loire-Atlantique department are:

1. Arrondissement of Châteaubriant-Ancenis, (subprefecture: Châteaubriant) with 76 communes. The population of the arrondissement was 231,576 in 2021.
2. Arrondissement of Nantes, (prefecture of the Loire-Atlantique department: Nantes) with 76 communes. The population of the arrondissement was 881,045 in 2021.
3. Arrondissement of Saint-Nazaire, (subprefecture: Saint-Nazaire) with 55 communes. The population of the arrondissement was 345,185 in 2021.

== History ==
In 1800 the arrondissements of Nantes, Ancenis, Châteaubriant, Paimbœuf and Savenay were established. In 1868 Saint-Nazaire replaced Savenay as subprefecture. The arrondissements of Ancenis and Paimbœuf were disbanded in 1926, and Ancenis was restored in 1943. The arrondissement of Châteaubriant-Ancenis was created in January 2017 from the former arrondissements of Châteaubriant and Ancenis and 4 communes from the arrondissement of Nantes.
