= Yves Daniel =

French politician

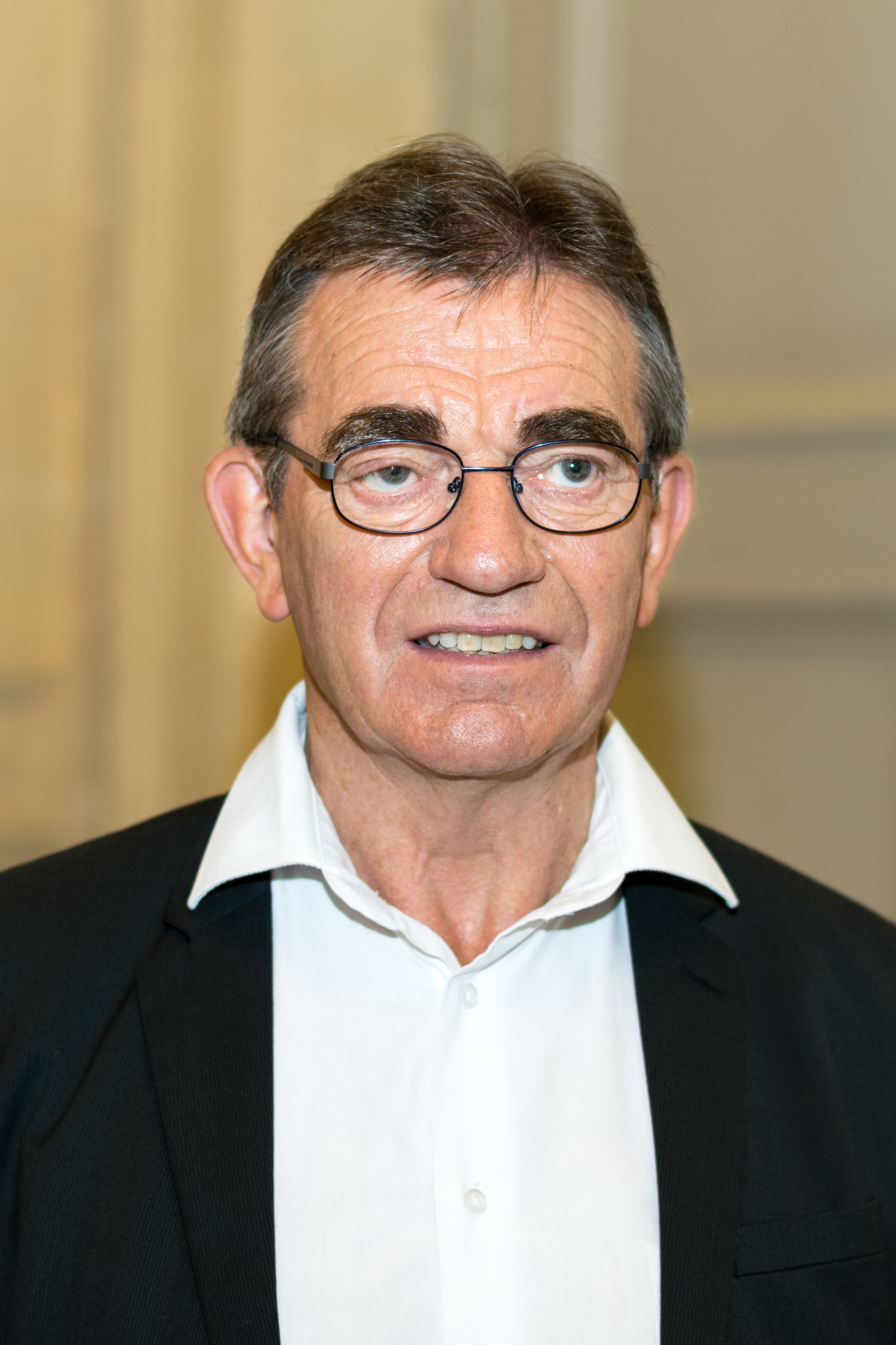
- Yves Daniel in the National Assembly, in June 2017.
- Parliamentary group: Socialist, then LREM

Deputy for Loire-Atlantique's 6th constituency in the National Assembly of France
- In office 2012–2022
- Preceded by: Michel Hunault
- Succeeded by: Jean-Claude Raux

Personal details
- Born: 31 July 1954 (age 71) Mouais

Yves Daniel is a French politician who was a French National Assembly deputy from 2012 to 2022. He was elected in 2012 as a socialist, representing Loire-Atlantique's 6th constituency, defeating Michel Hunault of New Centre. At the 2017 election, he was elected as a candidate for LREM. He was not a candidate in 2022.
