= Xavier Hunault =

French politician (1923–2021)

Deputy from Loire-Atlantique
- In office 18 November 1962 – 1 April 1993
- Preceded by: Bernard Lambert
- Succeeded by: Michel Hunault

Mayor of Châteaubriant
- In office 1959–1989
- Succeeded by: Martine Buron

General Councillor of the Canton of Châteaubriant

Personal details
- Born: 29 January 1923 Châteaubriant, France
- Died: 16 January 2021 (aged 97)
- Party: NI; UDF

Xavier Hunault (29 January 1923 – 16 January 2021) was a French politician. He was the father of politicians Michel Hunault and Alain Hunault.
