= Loire-Atlantique's 2nd constituency =

Constituency of the National Assembly of France

2nd constituency of Loire-Atlantique
- inline Constituency of the National Assembly of France

- Constituency in Department

- Location of Loire-Atlantique in France
- Deputy: Andy Kerbrat; LFI
- Department: Loire-Atlantique
- Cantons: Nantes II, Nantes III, Nantes IV, Nantes IX

The 2nd constituency of Loire-Atlantique is a French legislative constituency in the Loire-Atlantique département, covering the eastern part of the city of Nantes. Like the other 576 French constituencies, it elects one MP using the two-round system, with a run-off if no candidate receives over 50% of the vote in the first round. From 1958 to 1986, the constituency was made up of the cantons of Nantes-5, 6 and 7. In 1986, this was changed to the cantons of Nantes-2, 3, 4 and 9. (In 2015, Nantes-9 was abolished and its territory split between Nantes-2 and 7.)

== Historic representation ==
Election	Member	Party
1997	Marie-Françoise Clergeau	PS
2002	Marie-Françoise Clergeau	PS
2007	Marie-Françoise Clergeau	PS
2012	Marie-Françoise Clergeau	PS
2017	Valérie Oppelt	LREM
2022	Andy Kerbrat	LFI
2024	Andy Kerbrat	LFI

== Election results ==
=== 2024 ===
Candidate	Party	Alliance	First round			Second round		
Candidate	Party	Alliance	Votes	%	+/–	Votes	%	+/–
Andy Kerbrat	LFI	NFP	34,341	51.67	+5.05			
Valérie Oppelt	REN	Ensemble	17,744	26.70	-1.74			
Nolwenn Fer	RN		9,157	13.78	+8.79			
Louisa Amrouche	LR	UDC	3,893	5.86	-3.49			
Adrien Copros	Volt		786	1.18	new			
Nicolas Bazille	LO		542	0.82	+0.06			
Zora Chignole	DIV		0	0.00	new			
Nicolas Vabre	NPA		0	0.00	new			
Votes			66,463	100.00				
Valid votes			66,463	98.37	+0.03			
Blank votes			832	1.23	+0.06			
Null votes			266	0.39	-0.02			
Turnout			67,561	73.81	+17.70			
Abstentions			23,971	26.19	-17.70			
Registered voters			91,532					
Result			LFI HOLD					

=== 2022 ===
Legislative Election 2022: Loire-Atlantique's 2nd constituency
Party	Candidate	Votes	%	±%
LFI (NUPÉS)	Andy Kerbrat	23,524	46.62	+11.45
LREM (Ensemble)	Valérie Oppelt	14,350	28.44	-11.34
LR (UDC)	Foulques Chombart De Lauwe	4,717	9.35	−4.60
RN	Nicolas Gasnier	2,520	4.99	+1.07
REC	Cecile Scheffen	2,077	4.12	N/A
Volt	Christine Lambart	1,173	2.32	N/A
Others	N/A	2,093	4.12	
Turnout		50,454	56.11	−0.66
2nd round result
LFI (NUPÉS)	Andy Kerbrat	26,851	55.80	+15.79
LREM (Ensemble)	Valérie Oppelt	21,271	44.20	−15.79
Turnout		48,122	55.06	+9.66
LFI gain from LREM				

=== 2017 ===
Candidate	Label	First round		Second round	
Candidate	Label	Votes	%	Votes	%
Valérie Oppelt	REM	19,160	39.78	21,542	59.99
Carole Malard	FI	7,627	15.83	14,370	40.01
Sébastien Pilard	LR	6,717	13.95		
Pascale Chiron	ECO	4,905	10.18		
Alain Robert	PS	4,410	9.16		
Agnès Chrissement	FN	1,888	3.92		
Sophie Clocher	DVG	531	1.10		
Elhadi Azzi	PRG	464	0.96		
Jean de Mascureau	DLF	421	0.87		
Isabelle Dudouet-Bercegeay	DIV	377	0.78		
Mary Haway	DVG	310	0.64		
Oriane Lévêque	DIV	274	0.57		
Aurélien Boulé	REG	247	0.51		
Sandra Cormier	EXG	242	0.50		
Nicolas Bazille	EXG	234	0.49		
Donatienne Jossic	REG	178	0.37		
Laurent Cottereau	DVG	96	0.20		
François Chapron	DVG	85	0.18		
Béatrice Dumontet-Tarrius	DVD	0	0.00		
Votes		48,166	100.00	35,912	100.00
Valid votes		48,166	98.85	35,912	92.15
Blank votes		419	0.86	2,392	6.14
Null votes		142	0.29	666	1.71
Turnout		48,727	56.77	38,970	45.40
Abstentions		37,107	43.23	46,868	54.60
Registered voters		85,834		85,838	
Source: Ministry of the Interior

=== 2012 ===
2012 legislative election in Loire-Atlantique's 2nd constituency
Candidate	Party	First round		Second round	
Candidate	Party	Votes	%	Votes	%
Marie-Françoise Clergeau	PS	21,118	44.64%	26,205	62.22%
Laurence Garnier	UMP	13,195	27.89%	15,911	37.78%
Pascale Chiron	EELV	3,625	7.66%		
Eliana Delisante	FG	3,024	6.39%		
Michel Lombardo	FN	2,666	5.64%		
Yvon Chotard	MoDem	1,585	3.35%		
Louis-Georges Barret	PCD	1,052	2.22%		
Jean-Philippe Guillouche	AC	337	0.71%		
Jean-Pierre Souverville	AEI	297	0.63%		
Sandra Cormier	NPA	260	0.55%		
Hélène Defrance	LO	147	0.31%		
Valid votes		47,306	99.30%	42,116	97.83%
Spoilt and null votes		335	0.70%	935	2.17%
Votes cast / turnout		47,641	58.40%	43,051	52.77%
Abstentions		33,940	41.60%	38,531	47.23%
Registered voters		81,581	100.00%	81,582	100.00%

=== 2007 ===
Legislative Election 2007: Loire-Atlantique's 2nd constituency
Party	Candidate	Votes	%	±%
UMP	François Pinte	19,217	38.93	
PS	Marie-Françoise Clergeau	17,968	36.40	
MoDem	Jean-Yves Bocher	4,220	8.55	
LV	Pascale Chiron	2,545	5.16	
Far left	Thierry Fourage	1,177	2.38	
Others	N/A	4,252		
Turnout		49,782	60.27	
2nd round result
PS	Marie-Françoise Clergeau	26,479	54.76	
UMP	François Pinte	21,876	45.24	
Turnout		49,198	59.57	
PS hold				

=== 2002 ===
Legislative Election 2002: Loire-Atlantique's 2nd constituency
Party	Candidate	Votes	%	±%
UMP	François Pinte	18,079	37.49	
PS	Marie-Françoise Clergeau	17,698	36.70	
UDF	Jean-Yves Bocher	3,241	6.72	
FN	Barbara Lussaud	2,441	5.06	
LV	Catherine Choquet	1,749	3.63	
PR	Yvon Chotard	981	2.03	
Others	N/A	3,482		
Turnout		48,757	63.67	
2nd round result
PS	Marie-Françoise Clergeau	22,316	50.37	
UMP	François Pinte	21,992	49.63	
Turnout		45,086	58.88	
PS hold				

=== 1997 ===
Legislative Election 1997: Loire-Atlantique's 2nd constituency
Party	Candidate	Votes	%	±%
PS	Marie-Françoise Clergeau	13,233	30.66	
RPR	Elisabeth Hubert	12,882	29.85	
FN	Samuel Maréchal	4,439	10.28	
DVD	Annick du Roscoät	3,107	7.20	
LV	Gérard Aubron	2,313	5.36	
PCF	Claude Constant	2,204	5.11	
DVG	Yvon Chotard	1,300	3.01	
UDF	Bertrand Tourillon	1,087	2.52	
Others	N/A	2,595		
Turnout		44,708	61.22	
2nd round result
PS	Marie-Françoise Clergeau	23,051	50.82	
RPR	Elisabeth Hubert	22,307	49.18	
Turnout		47,153	64.57	
PS hold				

== References and Sources ==
- Official results of French elections from 1998: "Résultats électoraux officiels en France" (in French). Archived from the original on 20 December 2011.
