= Jean-Claude Raux =

French politician

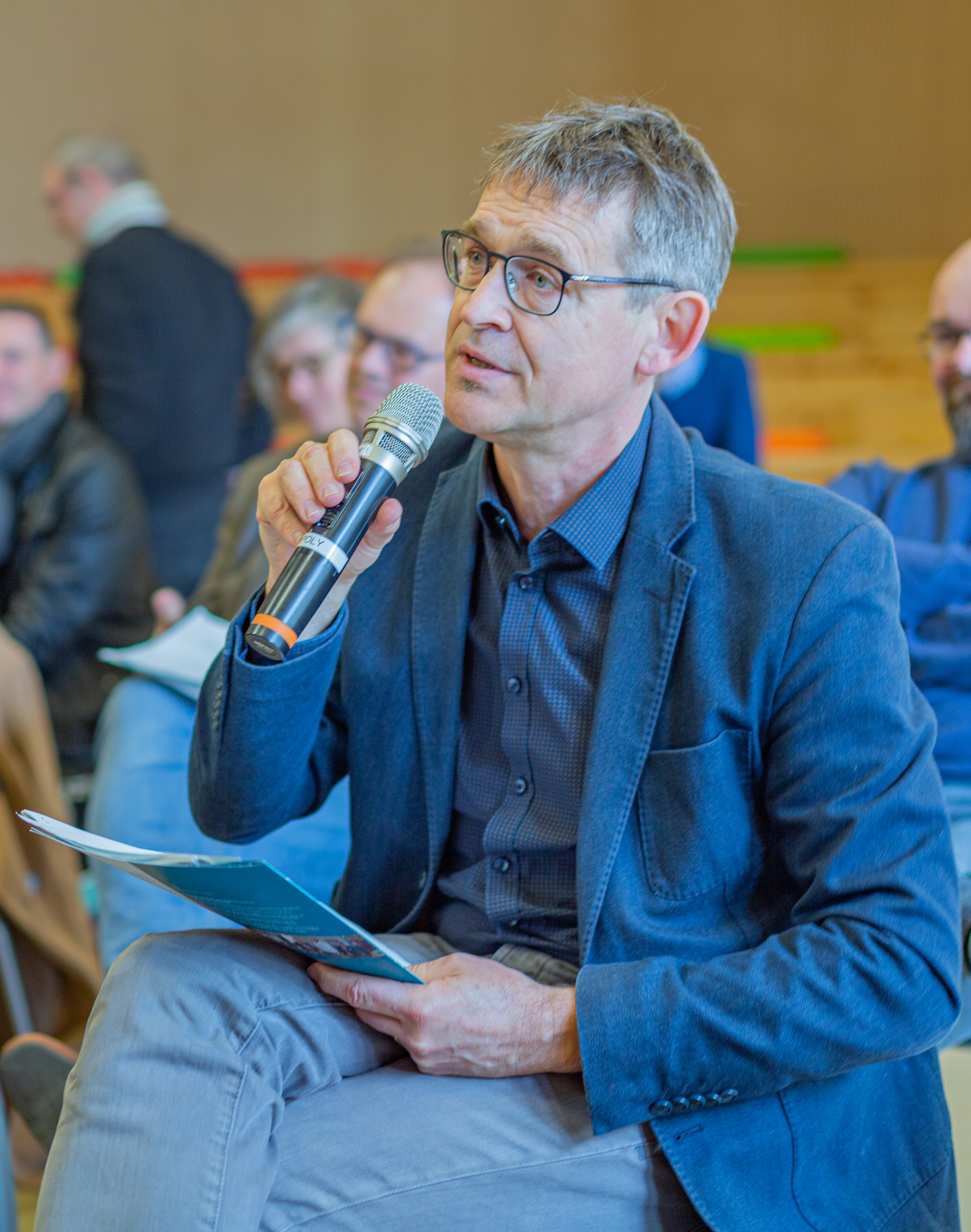
- Raux in 2022.

Member of the National Assembly
- Incumbent
- Assumed office 22 June 2022
- Preceded by: Yves Daniel
- Parliamentary group: ECO-NUPES (2022-2024); EcoS (since 2024)
- Constituency: Loire-Atlantique's 6th

Mayor of Saffré
- In office 25 May 2020 – 8 July 2022
- Preceded by: Jocelyne Poulin
- Succeeded by: Marie-Alexy Lefeuvre

Municipal councillor of Saffré
- Incumbent
- Assumed office 9 March 2008

Personal details
- Born: 18 January 1967 (age 59) Argentan, France
- Party: Territoires44
- Profession: Teacher

Jean-Claude Raux (born January 18, 1967, in Argentan) is a French politician and a member of the National Assembly for Loire-Atlantique's 6th constituency since 2022.

A former literature and English teacher in Redon, he was elected to Saffré's municipal council in 2008. He became its mayor in 2020.

In 2022, as a member of the regionalist movement Territoires44 and supported by the NUPES coalition and EELV, he was elected as a deputy for Loire-Atlantique's 6th constituency. In the Parliament he is affiliated to the Ecologist Group.
