= Prefecture Building of Loire-Atlantique =

Government building in Nantes, France

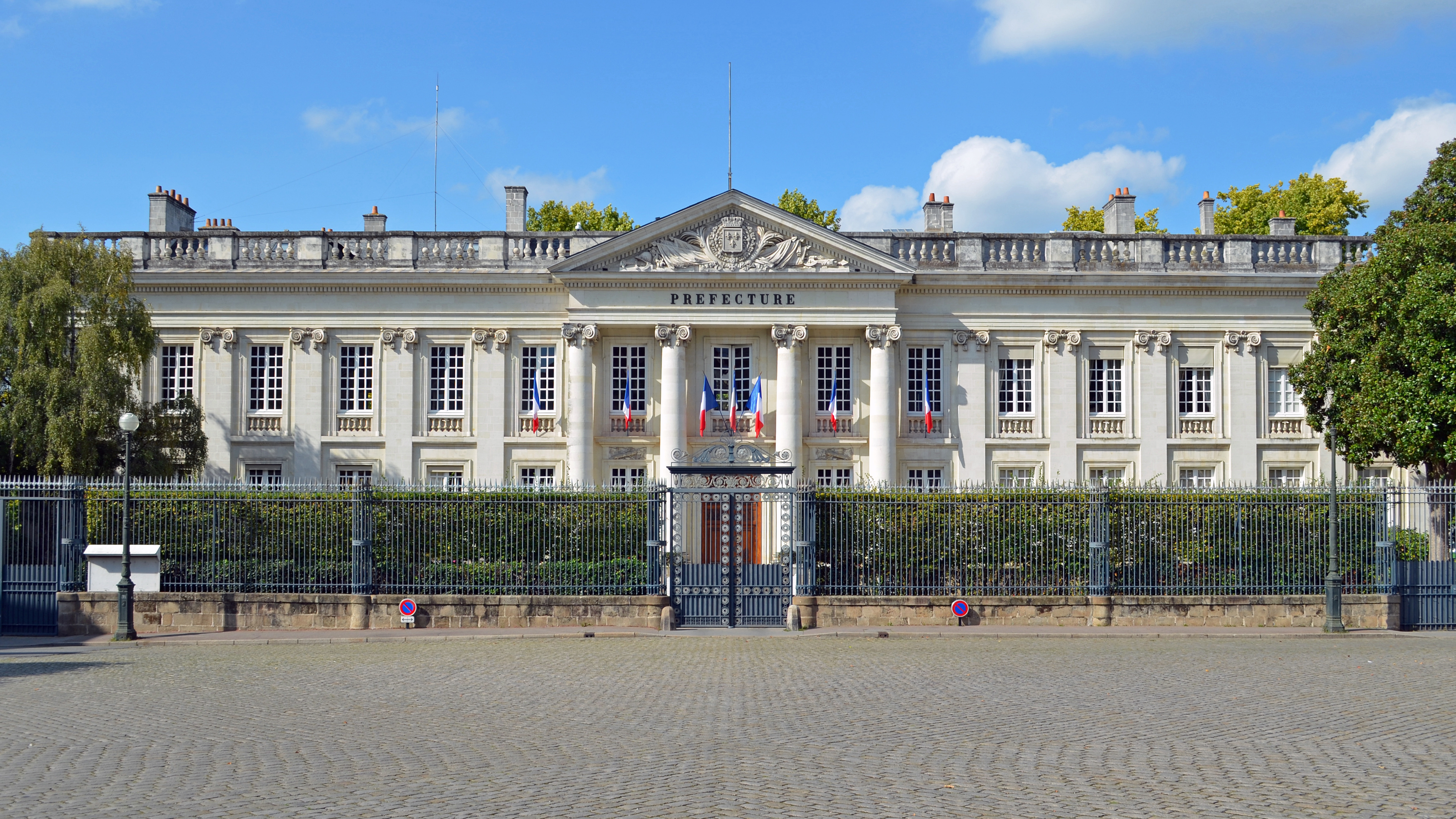
- Prefecture building
- Interactive map of Prefecture Building of Loire-Atlantique
- Location: Nantes; Loire-Atlantique
- Coordinates: 47°13′14″N 1°33′11″W
- Type: Prefecture building
- Completion date: 18th century
- Dedicated date: Prefecture of Loire-Atlantique
- Patrimoniality: Listed as a historic monument (1947)

The Prefecture of Loire-Atlantique is a government building located in Nantes, France. It serves as the administrative headquarters of the Loire-Atlantique department.

== Location ==
The building is located in the city center of Nantes, with its northern façade facing the Quai Ceineray along the Erdre River and its southern façade overlooking Place Roger-Salengro.

== History ==
=== Old building ===
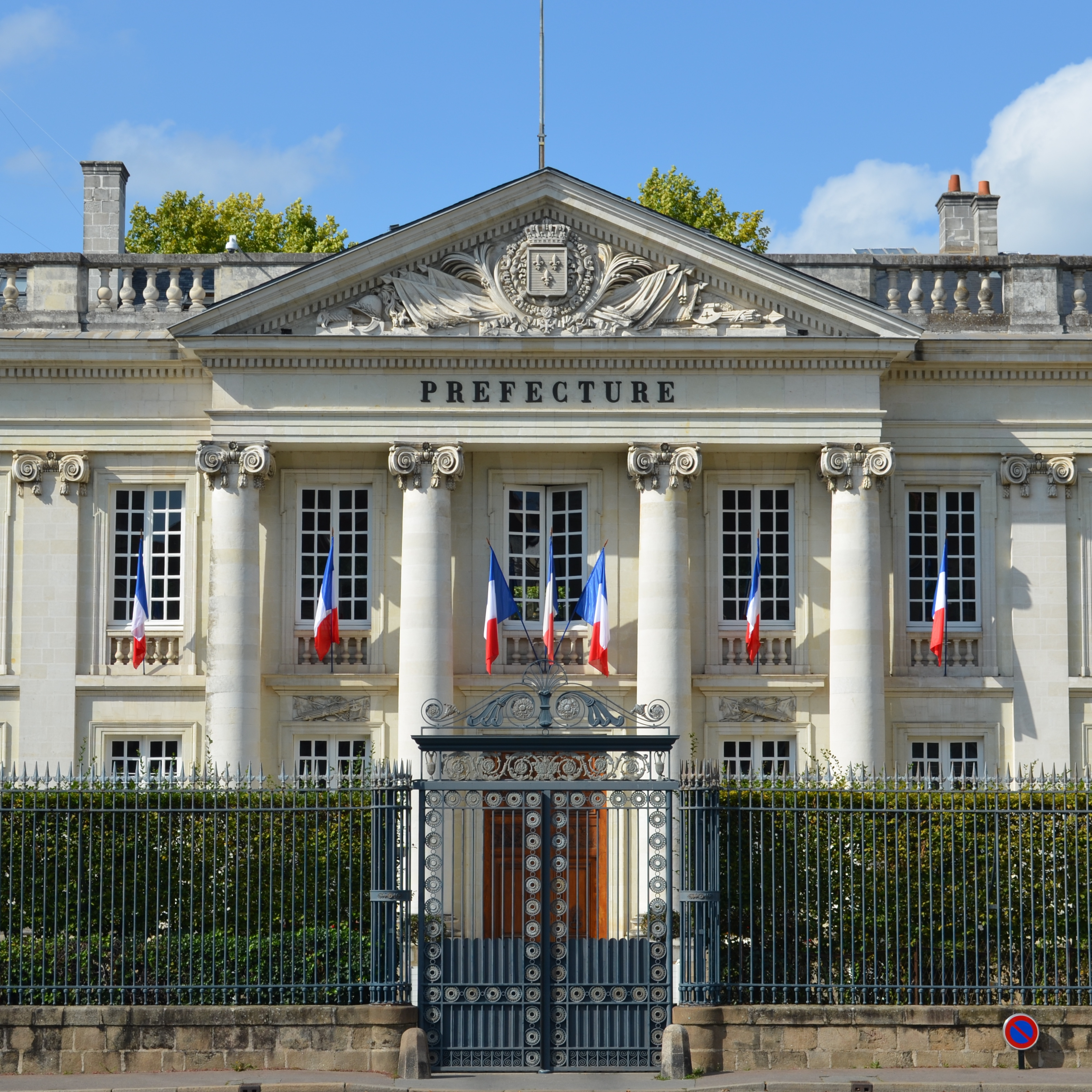
Main entrance

The Chamber of Accounts of Brittany was established in Nantes by decision of Anne of Brittany in 1492. Louis XII later acquired the land of the former Cordeliers convent for the construction of the building. Work began in 1515 under Francis I and was completed in 1553 during the reign of Henry II. The northern façade of the structure bordered the city ramparts along the banks of the Erdre River.

From its inception, the building was also intended to house the archives of the province of Brittany. Over time, the weight of the documents weakened the structure, and by the 18th century, the supports used to reinforce the floors had become inadequate. In 1755, architect Pierre Vigné de Vigny proposed a comprehensive reconstruction plan, which included a new Chamber of Accounts facing a semicircular square. In 1759, a commission of experts declared the existing building to be in a state of disrepair.

=== Work of Jean-Baptiste Ceineray ===
When Jean-Baptiste Ceineray (1722–1811) became the city architect in 1759, the reconstruction of the building was among his assigned projects. It was one of the first plans he developed—after those for the theater and a grain market—and the only public building he fully completed himself. In 1760, he produced an approved plan and cost estimate, later integrating the project into the city’s overall urban plan of 1761, the same year he increased the estimated cost by approximately 20%. As part of this plan, Ceineray designed a large square in front of the southern façade, which served as the main entrance.

In 1761, Jean-Baptiste Ceineray proposed relocating the building from the site designated in Pierre Vigné de Vigny’s 1755 plan. Although no official record of this proposal survives, Georges Durville noted that it would have moved the structure slightly south onto the Cordeliers' land. The final plan of 1762, however, retained the original location, situated behind and slightly east of the previous building, whose façade stood approximately where the current gate is. Due to the river alluvium of the Erdre extending about two meters below the riverbed, the foundations were constructed on piles.

The cornerstone of the building was laid on 6 September 1763, using materials recovered from the demolition of the city ramparts. The main structure was completed by 1769, but construction subsequently slowed. The departure of the Duke of Aiguillon, governor of Brittany and supporter of the project, in 1768 contributed to delays. A dispute arose between the Estates of Brittany and the royal administration regarding the placement of coats of arms: the administration planned to place the arms of France on the southern façade and those of Brittany on the northern one, while the Estates demanded that both appear on each side. Financial difficulties also emerged as costs exceeded initial estimates. In 1774, a fire at the Cordeliers convent endangered the archives temporarily stored there. Following this event, the Council of State ordered the resumption of work in 1775. Ceineray, then ill, transferred supervision to the engineer Grolleau.

Ceineray’s work faced criticism from Hénon, a draftsman claiming architectural expertise, who in 1778 alleged structural flaws in the design of the building’s grand staircase. Ceineray did not respond personally, but several contemporaries—including royal architect Jean-Rodolphe Perronet, former mayor Jean-Baptiste Gellée de Prémion, and architect François Cacault—supported him. After two years of deliberation, a report by Mathurin Crucy, a young architect trained by Ceineray, fully exonerated him.

During this period, construction progressed slowly but continued. In 1778, Charles-Guillaume Robinot-Bertrand completed the sculptural work. In 1780, due to conflicts with the city council, the members of the Chamber of Accounts held their sessions in Redon, while the German sculptor Sébastien Leysner (1728–1781), based in Angers, created the fireplaces. By 1782, the interior decoration was finished, and the Chamber of Accounts of Brittany moved into the building. In May 1783, the chapel was consecrated.

The Chamber of Accounts of Brittany, abolished in September 1790 by the National Constituent Assembly, occupied the building for less than ten years.

=== Prefecture building ===
In 1800, the building was assigned to the departmental administration and became the prefecture of Loire-Atlantique. Between 1825 and 1826, architect François-Jean-Baptiste Ogée (1760–1845) modified the building to include a residence for the prefect, adding two wings. In 1829, a garden enclosed by railings was created in front of the southern façade.

The prefecture was listed as a historic monument on February 26, 1947.

== Architecture ==
=== Exterior ===
Jean-Baptiste Ceineray drew inspiration from the “royal architecture” of the period, as promoted by Ange-Jacques Gabriel (1698–1782) and Jacques-François Blondel (1705–1774).

The building has a rectangular plan, three times longer than it is wide, with a single story above the ground floor. The north façade along Quai Ceineray originally had no formal entrance, featuring only two simple doors at the basement level, which contains a vaulted cellar initially intended for archives. The main entrance is located on Place Roger-Salengro.

The building, like all of Jean-Baptiste Ceineray’s work, was designed according to the principles of neoclassical architecture. It is symmetrical, with a portico of four Ionic columns at the center of each façade, each column three feet six inches in diameter, resting on a shared base. Triangular pediments surmount the porticos, decorated on the south side with the arms of the King of France and on the north side with those of the province of Brittany. A frieze with a plain band and a dentilled cornice runs along the base of the pediments. The two rear sections integrate with the overall composition of the façades. Each façade features two rows of twelve flat-arched windows, each topped with a keystone. On the south side, full-height pilasters separate the openings, and the central door has two leaves, surrounded by sculptures by Charles Robinot-Bertrand (1747–1822) representing Religion and Justice. The corners are finished with rusticated joints.

The side façades follow the same compositional pattern as the main façades, featuring five openings with ornate keystones, rusticated stone quoins, and corner chains. A centrally positioned French window with a semicircular opening provides access.

The basement is elevated on the north side due to the slope of the ground. On the south side, a five-step stoop leads to the entrance door. The attic is hidden behind a stone balustrade that continues the line of the façade, forming a terrace roof.

The appearance of the building was modified in the 19th century with the addition of a garden enclosed by railings, which obscure the basement on the south side and create a flattened visual effect. The view from the Erdre side still reflects the site’s original appearance. Lateral buildings constructed in the 19th century, along with the surrounding structures on Place Roger-Salengro, partially overshadow the hôtel. Its location below the cathedral and the alignment along Rue Royale also contribute to the perception of the building being visually diminished.

=== Interior ===
Originally, the ground floor was organized around a large vestibule with a ceiling decorated with fleurs-de-lis. On the eastern side, four vaulted rooms were designated for archival storage, with a separate entrance providing independent access. The western side contained the refreshment room, the registry, and private apartments.

Access to the upper floor was provided by a grand double staircase with two balustraded ramps, with the landing supported by two fluted Ionic columns.

The upper floor contains two principal rooms. The first, the Procurators’ Hall, accessible directly from the landing, measures 58 by 30 feet and features walls decorated with pilasters and panels against a background of fleurs-de-lis, ermine motifs, and sculpted ornaments. It is served by eight double-leaf doors. The second principal room is the courtroom, with three of its walls paneled. Additional rooms include offices and apartments, connected to the ground floor by four independent staircases, as well as a chapel.

=== Critical reception of the work ===
In Mémoires d’un touriste, Stendhal criticized the monument, describing it as “(...) a large Gallo-Greek building of foolish architecture, like the School of Medicine in Paris.” Despite this, the Palace of the Chambre des Comptes of Brittany is considered one of Jean-Baptiste Ceineray’s notable works. Pierre Lelièvre suggested that the site could have been used more effectively and that, although later additions by other architects altered the building, the original design would have remained ordinary yet harmonious and estimable. In contrast, Hélène Rousteau-Chambon praised the building as a masterpiece, emphasizing Ceineray’s successful adoption of the architectural vocabulary of his Parisian contemporaries.

== See also ==
- Monument historique

== Bibliography ==
- Lelièvre, Pierre (1988). Nantes au XVIIIe siècle : urbanisme et architecture [Nantes in the 18th century: urban planning and architecture]. Architectures (in French). Paris: Éditions Picard. ISBN 2-7084-0351-6.
- Collectif (1978). Iconographie de Nantes [Iconography of Nantes] (in French). Nantes: Musée Dobrée. pp. 53–54.
- Rousteau-Chambon, Hélène (2001). "La Chambre des comptes de Jean-Baptiste Ceineray" [The Chamber of Accounts of Jean-Baptiste Ceineray]. Annales de Bretagne et des pays de l'Ouest (in French). 108–4 (108–4). Rennes: Presses universitaires de Rennes: 81–98. doi:10.4000/abpo.1676. ISSN 0399-0826.
- Flohic, Jean-Luc (1999). Le Patrimoine des communes de la Loire-Atlantique [The Heritage of the Municipalities of Loire-Atlantique]. Le patrimoine des communes de France (in French). Vol. 2. Charenton-le-Pont: Flohic éditions. ISBN 2-84234-040-X.
