= Loire-Atlantique's 10th constituency =

Constituency of the National Assembly of France

10th constituency of Loire-Atlantique
- inline Constituency of the National Assembly of France

- Constituency in Department

- Location of Loire-Atlantique in France
- Deputy: Sophie Errante; RE
- Department: Loire-Atlantique
- Cantons: Aigrefeuille-sur-Maine, Clisson, Le Loroux-Bottereau, Vallet, Vertou, Vertou-Vignoble

The 10th constituency of Loire-Atlantique is a French legislative constituency in the Loire-Atlantique département. Like the other 576 French constituencies, it elects one MP using the two-round system, with a run-off if no candidate receives over 50% of the vote in the first round.

== Historic representation ==
Election	Member	Party
1988	Joseph-Henri Maujoüan du Gasset	UDF
1993	Serge Poignant	RPR
1997	Serge Poignant	RPR
2002	Serge Poignant	UMP
2007	Serge Poignant	UMP
2012	Sophie Errante	PS
2017	Sophie Errante	LREM
2022	Sophie Errante	RE
2024	Sophie Errante	RE

== Election results ==
=== 2024 ===
Candidate	Party	Alliance	First round			Second round		
Candidate	Party	Alliance	Votes	%	+/–	Votes	%	+/–
Sophie Errante	RE	Ensemble	27,555	30.57	-0.93	38,983	42.94	-13.58
Maxime Viancin	LFI	NFP	25,055	27.80	-2.19	25,973	28.61	-14.87
Stéphanie Cotrel	RN		23,574	26.16	+14.92	25,826	28.45	new
Xavier Rineau	LR	UDC	8,889	9.86	-5.18			
Bruno Chevalier	FGR		2,947	3.27	new			
Jacques Cousin	DIV		1,211	1.34	new			
Emmanuèle Gardair	LO		893	0.99	+0.09			
Votes			90,124	100.00		90,782	100.00	
Valid votes			90,124	97.25	-0.42	90,782	97.00	+3.36
Blank votes			1,807	1.95	+0.38	2,097	2.24	-2.05
Null votes			744	0.80	+0.04	709	0.76	-1.31
Turnout			92,675	73.36	+21.78	93,588	74.07	+23.92
Abstentions			33,656	26.64	-21.78	32,768	25.93	-23.92
Registered voters			126,331			126,356		
Result			RE HOLD					

=== 2022 ===
Legislative Election 2022: Loire-Atlantique's 10th constituency
Party	Candidate	Votes	%	±%
LREM (Ensemble)	Sophie Errante	19,638	31.50	-13.42
LFI (NUPÉS)	Bruno Cailleteau	18,699	29.99	+8.31
LR (UDC)	Charlotte Luquiau	9,377	15.04	−4.36
RN	Geneviève Bannwarth	7,011	11.24	+4.38
REC	Sabine Leger	1,979	3.17	N/A
DIV	Guillaume Bonamy	1,404	2.25	N/A
Others	N/A	4,242	6.80	
Turnout		62,350	51.58	−3.80
2nd round result
LREM (Ensemble)	Sophie Errante	32,852	56.52	-7.37
LFI (NUPÉS)	Bruno Cailleteau	25,274	43.48	N/A
Turnout		58,126	50.15	+6.91
LREM hold				

=== 2017 ===
Candidate	Label	First round		Second round	
Candidate	Label	Votes	%	Votes	%
Sophie Errante	REM	27,946	44.92	28,560	63.89
Jérôme Guiho	LR	12,069	19.40	16,140	36.11
Gaëlle Chaillot	FI	8,400	13.50		
Brigitte Héridel	ECO	4,455	7.16		
Jean-Marc Beauvais	FN	4,270	6.86		
Jérôme Debuire	ECO	811	1.30		
Christophe Audren	DLF	788	1.27		
Maxime Chéneau	REG	769	1.24		
Marie-Claude Robin	PCF	633	1.02		
Christine Trimoreau	DVD	585	0.94		
René Brevet	UDI	432	0.69		
Daniel Tarlevé	EXD	378	0.61		
Yann Béliard	EXG	353	0.57		
Émilie Leguen	DIV	308	0.50		
François Fautrad	DVD	12	0.02		
Votes		62,209	100.00	44,700	100.00
Valid votes		62,209	97.90	44,700	90.10
Blank votes		917	1.44	3,615	7.29
Null votes		416	0.65	1,295	2.61
Turnout		63,542	55.38	49,610	43.24
Abstentions		51,187	44.62	65,119	56.76
Registered voters		114,729		114,729	
Source: Ministry of the Interior

=== 2012 ===
Legislative Election 2012: Loire-Atlantique's 10th constituency
Party	Candidate	Votes	%	±%
PS	Sophie Errante	26,048	38.99	
UMP	Laurent Dejoie	25,500	38.17	
FN	Hervé Leca	5,361	8.03	
EELV	Franck Nicolon	3,288	4.92	
FG	Pedro Maia	2,885	4.32	
MoDem	Alan Coraud	2,157	3.23	
Others	N/A	1,561		
Turnout		66,800	62.63	
2nd round result
PS	Sophie Errante	33,582	52.52	
UMP	Laurent Dejoie	30,362	47.48	
Turnout		63,944	59.95	
PS gain from UMP				

=== 2007 ===
|-

Legislative Election 2007: Loire-Atlantique's 10th constituency
Party	Candidate	Votes	%	±%
UMP	Serge Poignant	32,268	49.95	
PS	Martine L'Hostis	17,308	26.79	
MoDem	Marie-Sylvie Hardy	5,327	8.25	
Far left	Dominique Heraud	1,968	3.05	
DVE	Guy Grandjean	1,605	2.48	
FN	Hervé Leca	1,295	2.00	
Others	N/A	4,832		
Turnout		65,702	66.32	
2nd round result
UMP	Serge Poignant	33,354	56.85	
PS	Martine L'Hostis	25,318	43.15	
Turnout		59,954	60.53	
UMP hold				

=== 2002 ===
Legislative Election 2002: Loire-Atlantique's 10th constituency
Party	Candidate	Votes	%	±%
UMP	Serge Poignant	31,442	52.36	
PS	Martine L'Hostis	15,723	26.19	
FN	Hervé Leca	3,202	5.33	
LV	Franck Nicolon	2,175	3.62	
CPNT	Marie-Jeanne Dabin	1,520	2.53	
MPF	Gisele Coyac	1,304	2.17	
LCR	A.Laure Herve	1,231	2.05	
Others	N/A	3,447		
Turnout		61,249	69.05	
UMP hold				

=== 1997 ===
Legislative Election 1997: Loire-Atlantique's 10th constituency
Party	Candidate	Votes	%	±%
RPR	Serge Poignant	23,949	44.73	
PS	Christian Nadal	12,644	23.62	
FN	Hervé Leca	4,838	9.04	
LV	Denis Clavier	3,512	6.56	
PCF	Michel Gouty	2,774	5.18	
DVD	Valérie Caradec	2,728	5.10	
MRC	Marc Magnou	1,142	2.13	
DIV	Maryvonne Grit	1,117	2.09	
Others	N/A	836		
Turnout		57,344	72.80	
2nd round result
RPR	Serge Poignant	30,708	57.81	
PS	Christian Nadal	22,412	42.19	
Turnout		56,359	71.56	
RPR hold				

== Sources ==
- Official results of French elections from 1998: "Résultats électoraux officiels en France" (in French). Archived from the original on 20 December 2011.
