= Michel Hunault =

French politician

- Parliamentary group: RPR, UMP, UDF, NC.

Deputy for Loire-Atlantique's 6th constituency in the National Assembly of France
- In office 1993–2012
- Preceded by: Xavier Hunault
- Succeeded by: Yves Daniel

Personal details
- Born: February 14, 1960 (age 66) Châteaubriant

Michel Hunault (born February 14, 1960, in Châteaubriant) is a French politician. He was a member of the National Assembly of France, representing Loire-Atlantique's 6th constituency from 1993 to 2012. He was a member of (in order) RPR, UMP, UDF and New Centre. He followed his father, Xavier Hunault as deputy. Following the 2010 redistricting of French legislative constituencies, the sixth constituency expanded in area. He was defeated at the 2012 French legislative election by Yves Daniel of the socialists.

In 2017, he was considered for the legislative elections in Gardanne, under the Front National banner. This information is denied by the interested party. In March 2018, he stood in a by-election for the 5th constituency of French citizens living outside France (Spain), where he won 0.92% of the vote.
