= Élisabeth Hubert =

Élisabeth Hubert (born 26 May 1956) is a French doctor, politician and businesswoman. She was first elected to Parliament in 1986 for Loire-Atlantique's 2nd constituency. In 1996 she became Minister for Health under the first government of Alain Juppé. She was CEO of Laboratoires Fournier from 1997 to 2004 then of Alliagis.
