= Saffré =

- Commune
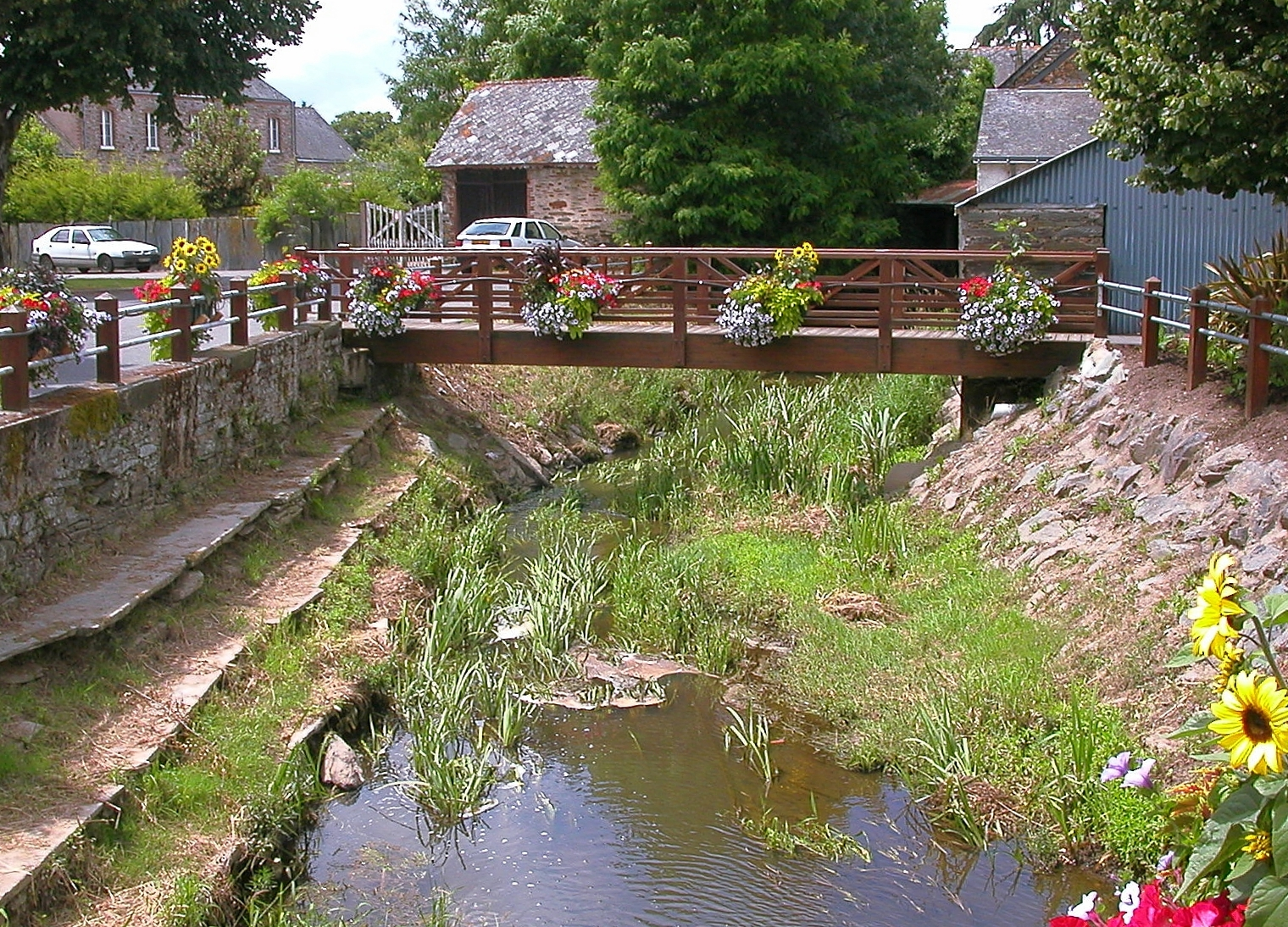
- The Isac

- Coat of arms
- Location of Saffré
- Location within France Location within Pays de la Loire
- Coordinates: 47°30′09″N 1°34′39″W
- Country: France
- Region: Pays de la Loire
- Department: Loire-Atlantique
- Arrondissement: Châteaubriant-Ancenis
- Canton: Guémené-Penfao
- Intercommunality: CC de Nozay

Government
  - Mayor (2022–2026): Marie-Alexy Lefeuvre
- Area^{1}: 57.46 km^{2} (22.19 sq mi)
- Highest elevation: 78 m (256 ft)
- Lowest elevation: 17 m (56 ft)
- Population (2023): 4,115
  - Density: 71.62/km^{2} (185.5/sq mi)
- Time zone: UTC+01:00 (CET)
  - Summer (DST): UTC+02:00 (CEST)
- INSEE/Postal code: 44149 /44390
- ^{1} French Land Register data, which excludes lakes, ponds, glaciers > 1 km^{2} (0.386 sq mi or 247 acres) and river estuaries.

Saffré (French pronunciation: [safʁe]; Breton: Saverieg) is a commune in the Loire-Atlantique department in western France.

== Population ==
Historical population

Year	Pop.	±% p.a.
1793	2,226	—
1821	2,639	+0.61%
1846	3,265	+0.86%
1872	3,455	+0.22%
1901	3,505	+0.05%
1926	2,860	−0.81%
1946	2,438	−0.80%
1962	2,336	−0.27%
1968	2,320	−0.11%

Year	Pop.	±% p.a.
1975	2,206	−0.72%
1982	2,492	+1.76%
1990	2,608	+0.57%
1999	2,679	+0.30%
2007	3,329	+2.75%
2012	3,680	+2.03%
2017	3,907	+1.20%
2023	4,115	+0.87%

Source: EHESS and INSEE (1968-2023)

== See also ==
- Communes of the Loire-Atlantique department
