= Serge Poignant =

French politician

Serge Poignant (born November 1, 1947, in Segré) is a member of the National Assembly of France. He represents the Loire-Atlantique department, and is a member of the Union for a Popular Movement.
