= Andy Kerbrat =

French politician (born 1990)

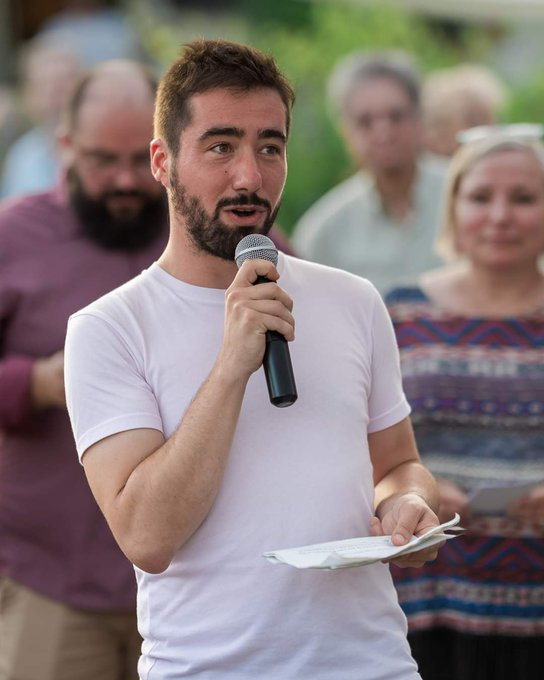
- Kerbrat in 2022.

Member of the National Assembly for Loire-Atlantique's 2nd constituency
- Incumbent
- Assumed office 22 June 2022
- Preceded by: Valérie Oppelt

Personal details
- Born: 1 October 1990 (age 35) Toulouse, Haute-Garonne, France
- Party: La France Insoumise

Andy Kerbrat (born 1 October 1990) is a French politician of La France Insoumise (LFI) who has served as a member of the National Assembly for Loire-Atlantique's 2nd constituency since 2022.

== Political career ==
After completing his A-Levels in Drama, he enrolled for a degree in History that he didn't complete. He did small time jobs before working for a telephone operator where he was active in trade union activism.

He was elected as member of the National Assembly for Loire-Atlantique's 2nd constituency in the 2022 French legislative election. He was reelected in the 2024 French legislative election.

Kerbrat defeated incumbent En Marche MP Valérie Oppelt.

== Drug offense ==
On 17 October 2024, Kerbrat was caught by police purchasing 1.35 grams of the synthetic drug 3-Methylmethcathinone (3-MMC) from a teenage dealer in a Paris metro station. He later admitted to the offense and stated he would seek medical treatment for his addiction.

== See also ==
- List of deputies of the 16th National Assembly of France
- List of deputies of the 17th National Assembly of France
