= Loire-Atlantique =

Department of France

Loire-Atlantique Leire-de-Bertègn (Gallo) Liger-Atlantel (Breton)
- Department of France
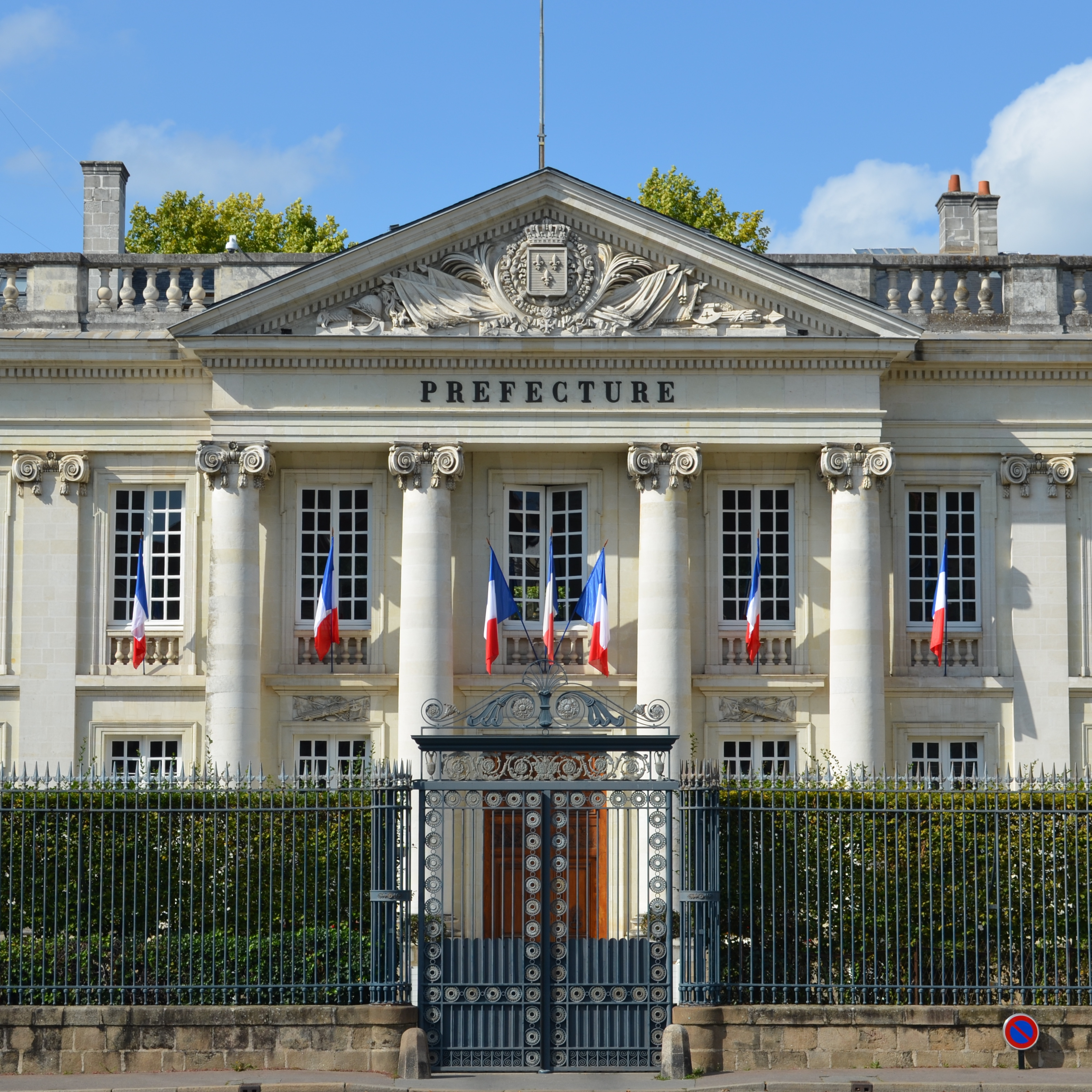
- Prefecture building in Nantes

- Flag Coat of arms

- Location of Loire-Atlantique in France
- Coordinates: 47°20′N 1°40′W
- Country: France
- Region: Pays de la Loire
- Prefecture: Nantes
- Subprefectures: Châteaubriant; Saint-Nazaire

Government
  - President of the Departmental Council: Michel Menard (PS)

Area^{1}
  - Total: 6,881 km^{2} (2,657 sq mi)

Population (2023)
  - Total: 1,487,570
  - Rank: 9th
  - Density: 216.2/km^{2} (559.9/sq mi)
- Time zone: UTC+1 (CET)
  - Summer (DST): UTC+2 (CEST)
- Department number: 44
- Arrondissements: 3
- Cantons: 31
- Communes: 207
- ^1 French Land Register data, which exclude estuaries, and lakes, ponds, and glaciers larger than 1 km^{2}

Loire-Atlantique (French pronunciation: [lwaʁ atlɑ̃tik]; Gallo: Leire-de-Bertègn; Breton: Liger-Atlantel; before 1957: Loire-Inférieure, Breton: Liger-Izelañ) is a department in the economical administrative region of Pays de la Loire and the historical and cultural region of Brittany on the west coast of France, named after the river Loire and the Atlantic Ocean. It had a population of 1,487,570 in 2023.

== History ==
Historical regions of Brittany before 1790

Loire-Atlantique is one of the original 83 departments created during the French Revolution on March 4, 1790. Originally, it was named Loire-Inférieure, but its name was changed in March 9, 1957 to Loire-Atlantique.

The area was formed from the Province of Brittany, and contains what many people still consider to be Brittany's capital, Nantes. However, during World War II, the Vichy Government set up a system of regional prefectures whereby on 19 April 1941 Loire-Atlantique was excluded from the Region of Brittany and united with neighbouring French departments, under the lead of Angers.

After the war these administrative changes were reimplemented in the 1955 boundary changes intended to optimise the management of the regions. There has since been a series of campaigns reflecting a strong local mood to have the department reintegrated with Brittany.

== Geography ==
Loire-Atlantique is part of the current region of Pays de la Loire and is surrounded by the departments of Morbihan, Ille-et-Vilaine, Maine-et-Loire, and Vendée, with the Atlantic on the west.

=== Principal towns ===
The most populous commune is Nantes, the prefecture. As of 2023, there are 7 communes with more than 25,000 inhabitants:

Commune	Population (2023)
Nantes	327,734
Saint-Nazaire	74,568
Saint-Herblain	50,973
Rezé	43,556
Saint-Sébastien-sur-Loire	28,596
Orvault	28,534
Vertou	26,227

== Demographics ==
Population development since 1801:

Historical population

Year	Pop.	±% p.a.
1801	369,305	—
1806	417,124	+2.47%
1821	433,815	+0.26%
1831	457,090	+0.52%
1841	486,806	+0.63%
1851	535,664	+0.96%
1861	580,207	+0.80%
1872	602,206	+0.34%
1881	625,625	+0.42%
1891	645,263	+0.31%
1901	664,971	+0.30%
1911	669,920	+0.07%
1921	649,691	−0.31%
1931	652,079	+0.04%

Year	Pop.	±% p.a.
1936	659,428	+0.22%
1946	665,064	+0.09%
1954	733,575	+1.23%
1962	803,372	+1.14%
1968	862,082	+1.18%
1975	934,882	+1.16%
1982	995,822	+0.91%
1990	1,052,466	+0.69%
1999	1,134,551	+0.84%
2007	1,246,967	+1.19%
2012	1,313,473	+1.04%
2017	1,394,909	+1.21%
2023	1,487,570	+1.08%

== Culture ==
Upper Brittany's indigenous language is Gallo, a Romance language related to French. The number of Gallo language speakers has been in steady decline since the early 20th century. The language is neither official nor taught in primary or secondary schools. In the south of the département (Pays de Retz), the local language was the Poitevin dialect.

The Breton language, a Celtic language, native to Lower Brittany, was historically spoken in the western area of Loire-Atlantique, and until 1920 in Batz-sur-Mer. This area (Guérande, Le Croisic, and La Baule) has a rather Breton toponymy: for instance, Guérande originates from the Breton Gwenn Rann (white or pure place).

The folklore and musical traditions of eastern or Upper Brittany are generally similar to those of western or Lower Brittany.

== Politics ==
The president of the Departmental Council is Michel Menard, elected in July 2021.

=== Current Deputies of the National Assembly ===
Constituency	Deputy	Party
Loire-Atlantique's 1st constituency	Karim Benbrahim	Socialist Party
Loire-Atlantique's 2nd constituency	Andy Kerbrat	La France Insoumise
Loire-Atlantique's 3rd constituency	Ségolène Amiot	La France Insoumise
Loire-Atlantique's 4th constituency	Julie Laernoes	The Ecologists
Loire-Atlantique's 5th constituency	Fabrice Roussel	Socialist Party
Loire-Atlantique's 6th constituency	Jean-Claude Raux	Territories44
Loire-Atlantique's 7th constituency	Sandrine Josso	MoDem
Loire-Atlantique's 8th constituency	Matthias Tavel	La France Insoumise
Loire-Atlantique's 9th constituency	Jean-Michel Brard	Miscellaneous right
Loire-Atlantique's 10th constituency	Sophie Errante	Renaissance

=== Current Senators ===
Senator	Party
Ronan Dantec (fr)	DVG
Joël Guerriau (fr)	UDI
Michelle Meunier (fr)	SOC
Christophe Priou	UMP
Yannick Vaugrenard	SOC

=== Political movements ===
Nantes is considered the capital of historic Brittany, but it is located in Loire-Atlantique, which is not currently part of the administrative region of Brittany. The reunification of historic Brittany is supported by a majority of Loire-Atlantique and is considered a prerequisite to further autonomy of Brittany as a whole.

== Transport ==
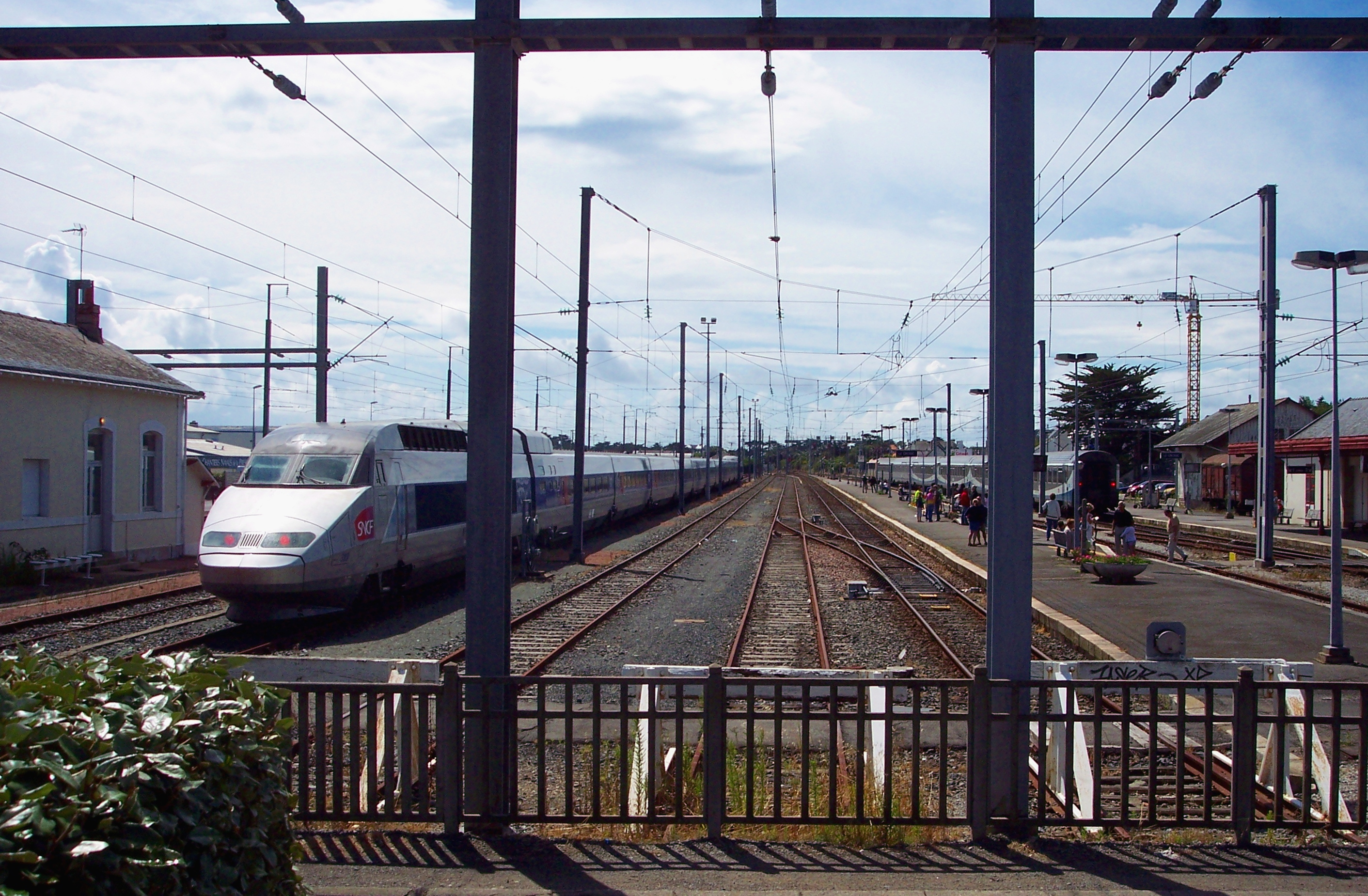
TGV and Interloire trains in Le Croisic

The département operates the Lila network (fr) of interurban buses, which link its villages, towns and cities. The urban areas of Nantes and Saint-Nazaire operate their own urban transport networks, known as TAN and STRAN (fr) respectively.

By rail, the regional trains and buses of the TER Pays de la Loire link major towns and cities of the Pays de la Loire and adjoining regions, including those of the département. Nantes is on the TGV network, with high speed trains running to Paris by the LGV Atlantique in just over 2 hours.

Nantes Atlantique Airport, located 8 km to the southwest of the city of Nantes, serves the département and surrounding areas. It is the biggest airport in northwestern France, linking with several French, North African and European cities, as well as Montreal in Canada.

== Tourism ==
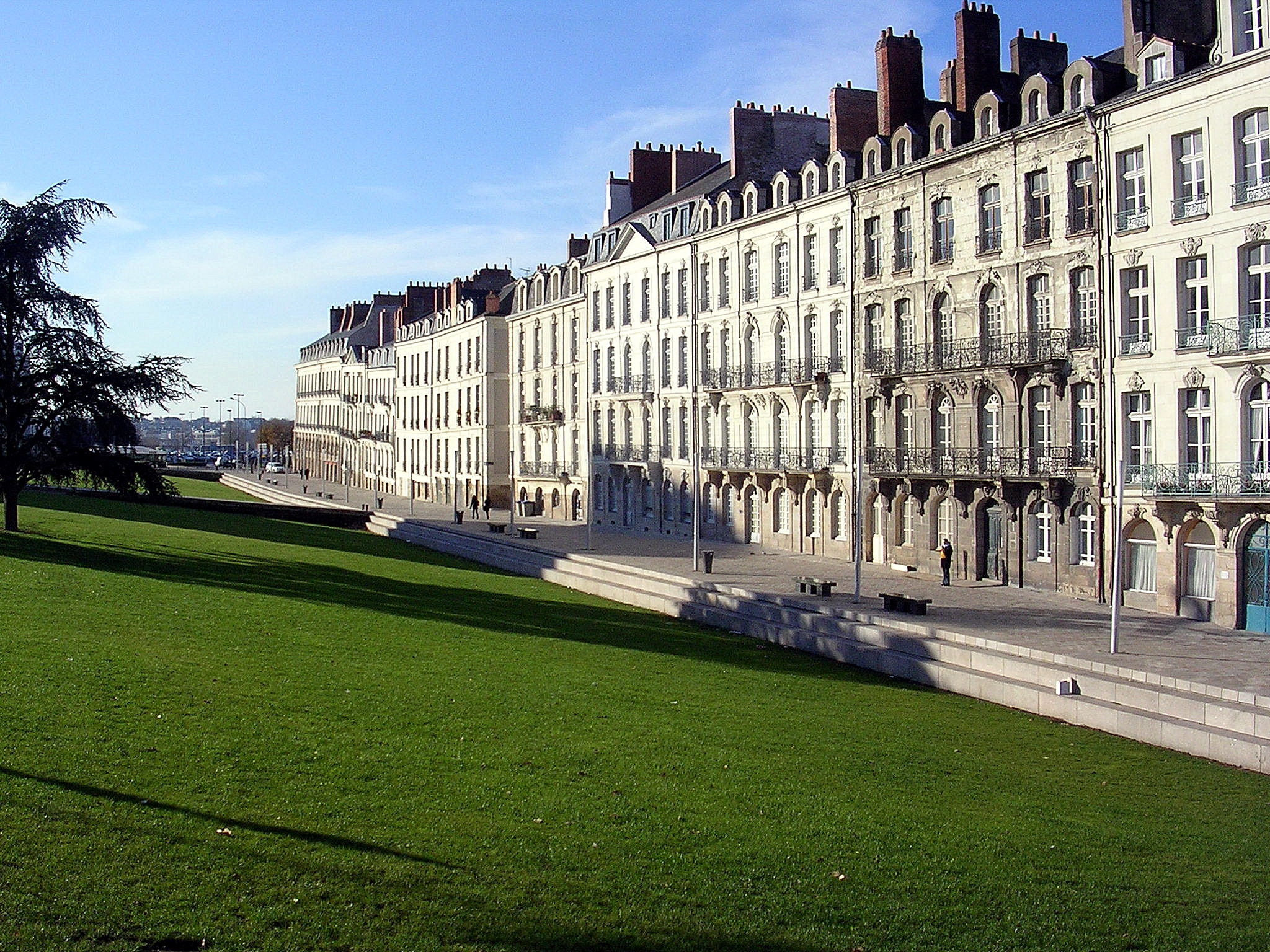
Nantes

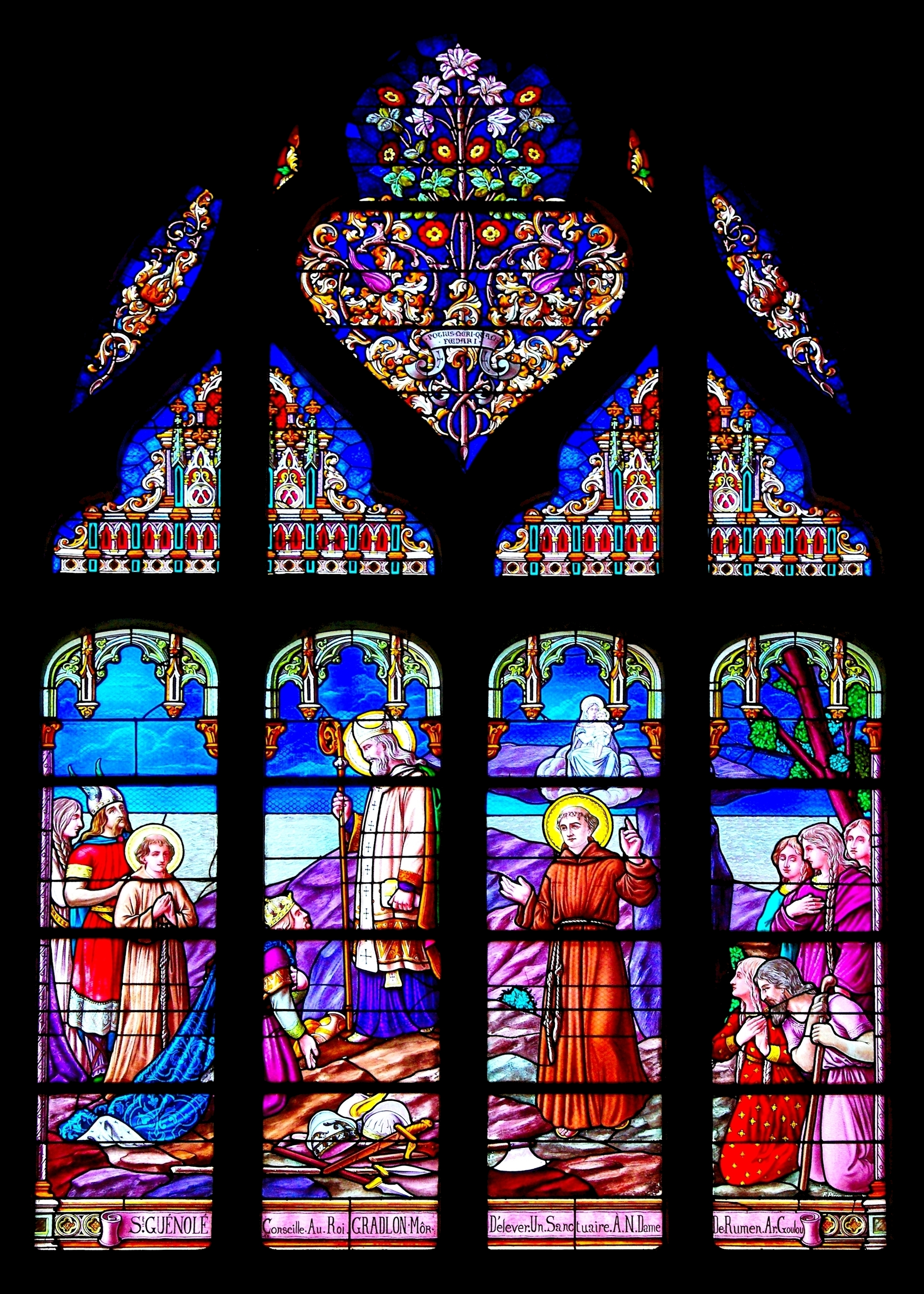
Stained glass-window of the church of Batz-sur-Mer

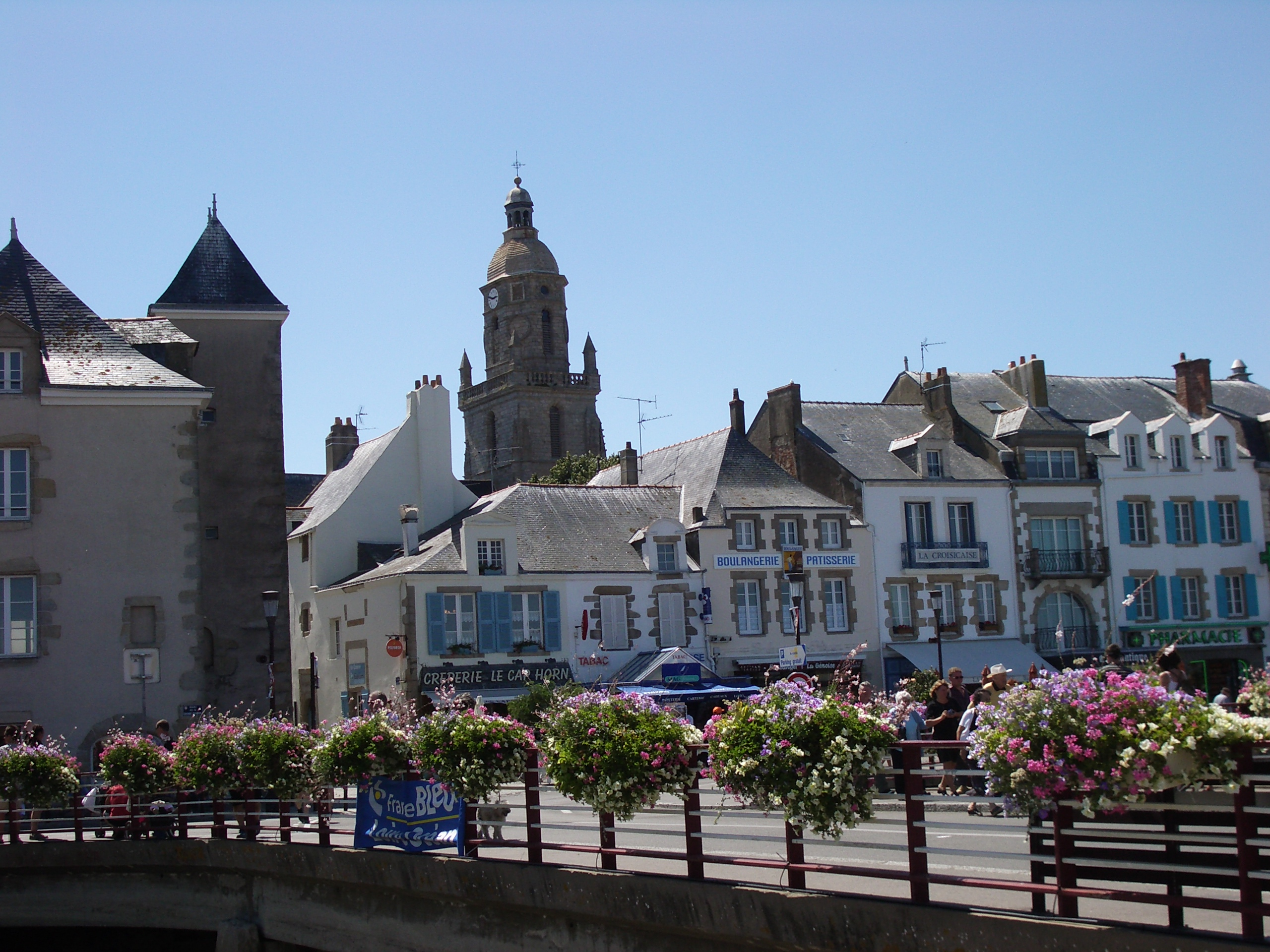
Le Croisic

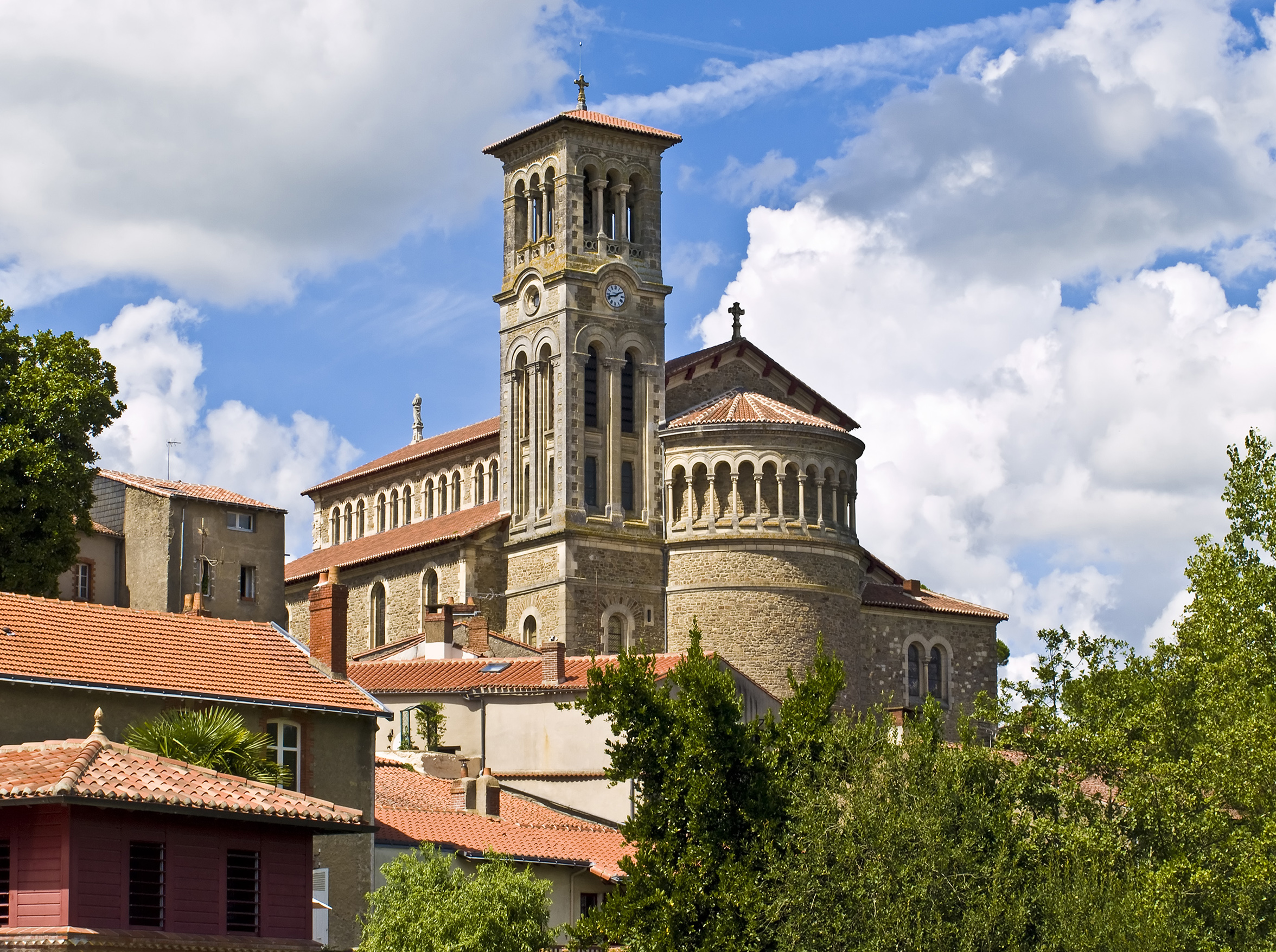
Clisson

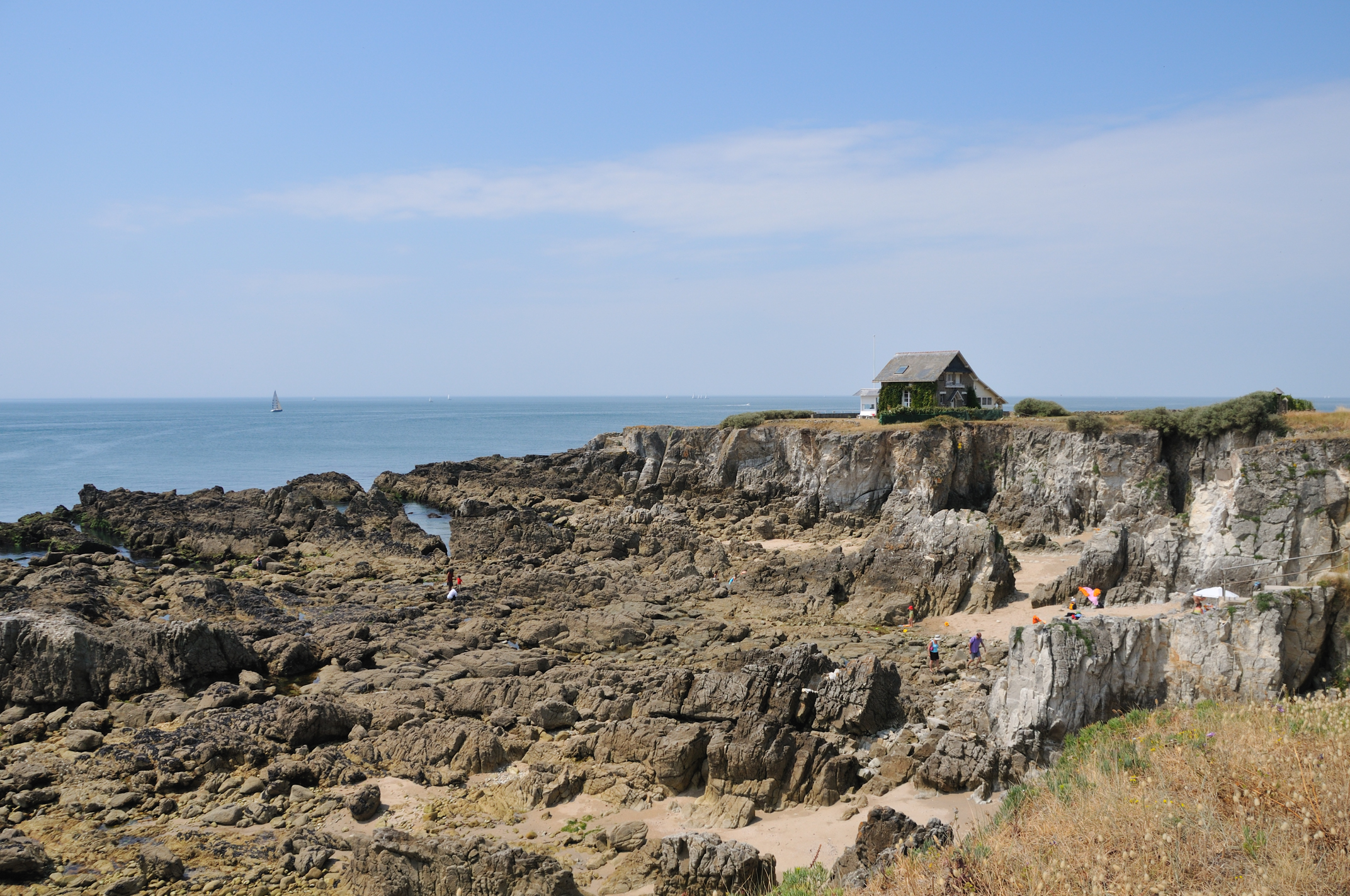
Coast near Le Pouliguen

== See also ==
- Cantons of the Loire-Atlantique department
- Communes of the Loire-Atlantique department
- Arrondissements of the Loire-Atlantique department
- La Baule - Guérande Peninsula
- Chantenay-sur-Loire
- Church of St Clement, Nantes
- Prefecture Building of Loire-Atlantique
- Port Lavigne
