= Le Peuple breton =

French news magazine

- Type: Monthly newspaper
- Format: A4
- Founder: Benoît Montagné
- Editor-in-chief: Gael Briand
- Editor: Popular presses of Brittany
- Language: Breton, French
- City: Saint-Brieuc
- Country: France
- Price: €5.00
- ISSN: 0245-9507
- Website: lepeuplebreton.bzh

Le Peuple breton (French pronunciation: [lə pœpl bʁətɔ̃], lit. 'The Breton people') is a monthly news magazine founded in Rennes in January 1964. It is a general-interest publication that defines itself as an opinion magazine presenting current affairs from a Breton perspective.

It was established by sixteen young activists concurrently with the founding of the Breton Democratic Union (UDB), a political party with autonomist, social, and ecological orientations. The magazine remains financially linked to the party, although most of its editorial staff, composed of both volunteer contributors and professional journalists, are not party members, and its content is open to a variety of perspectives.

Le Peuple breton is a regional periodical that has reported on news in Brittany for over fifty years. In May 2022, it released its 700th issue. Originally a four-page black-and-white tabloid, it adopted the A4 format in the 1970s, introduced color printing in the 1990s, and currently publishes 36 pages. Its circulation peaked at 15,000 copies and averaged 4,000 copies per month in 2023.

The monthly includes the Breton translation of its title, Pobl Vreizh, as a subtitle. This designation was originally used by a separate monthly published entirely in Breton and distributed alongside Le Peuple breton between 1970 and 1982. After its suspension due to financial difficulties, Pobl Vreizh was relaunched in 1984 as a supplement inserted into the French-language magazine.

== Editorial line ==
Le Peuple breton is a general-interest magazine that covers political, economic, social, and environmental issues related to Brittany and beyond. It has been described by journalist Clarisse Lucas of Agence France-Presse as part of a group of publications highlighting Brittany’s influence and cultural heritage. (Note: Lucas 2011, p. 277)

Le Peuple breton is also characterized as an opinion magazine that analyzes current affairs from a Breton perspective. Journalist and politician Georges Cadiou described its aim as serving Brittany “in a democratic and progressive way,” (Note: Cadiou 2013, p. 344) while writer Jean-Jacques Monnier characterized it as a publication addressing issues concerning Brittany that are less covered elsewhere. Its front page carries the slogan, “Today, to be free is to be informed.”

Le Peuple breton is considered a politically engaged magazine. Founded in 1964 alongside the creation of the Breton Democratic Union (UDB), a socialist and autonomist party, it has, according to historian Michel Nicolas, “been at once the brand image, the voice, and the theoretical support of the organization. (Note: Nicolas 2007, p. 274) That explains the constant care it has received.” Nicolas and historian Jean-Claude Le Corre noted in 1973 that the magazine did “not reveal the organization’s possible internal disagreements.” By presenting only “the broadest common denominator of activists’ opinions,” they argued, the magazine “often presented the party’s ideology in a diluted form” without reflecting “the UDB in its entirety.”

The title itself reveals the chosen perspective, explained in the first editorial of January 1964: “THE BRETON PEOPLE / For us, / they are the tram workers of Nantes; / they are the laid-off workers of the Saint-Nazaire foundries; […] / they are the young people who emigrate every year; / they are the underpaid teachers doing their best in overcrowded or run-down classrooms; […]” From its first editorial, the magazine affirmed the existence of the Breton people and emphasized the social dimension of its commitment. It also referenced Nantes and Saint-Nazaire, signaling support for the inclusion of Loire-Atlantique in the Brittany region. Since then, coverage of Loire-Atlantique has been presented on equal terms with that of the other departments of historic Brittany.

== History ==
=== Origins: Kaieroù an emsaver yaouank ===
In autumn 1959, a group of Rennes students belonging to the Mouvement pour l’organisation de la Bretagne (MOB), considered the first political structure of the postwar Emsav, created a study circle around a mimeographed review titled Kaieroù an emsaver yaouank (“Notebooks of the Young Activist”). Its objective was to establish a theoretical foundation to counter the “neither right nor left” activism prevalent in the Breton movement at the time. Economic and social issues were a central focus. The texts published anticipated the orientation that later guided the creation of Le Peuple breton in 1964. Several of the ten organizers of Kaieroù an emsaver yaouank went on to form the founding nucleus of the Breton Democratic Union. (Note: Nicolas 2007, p. 255)

Roger “Ronan” Leprohon, one of the students involved, outlined his vision for the review in issue no. 2 of November 1, 1959. He wrote: “I think the Notebooks should think big. That is what the Breton movement as a whole lacks most, at least in my view. Think big, think young, think modern. Adopt new techniques and tactics suited to our time—that is what is needed to succeed. […] We must not be content with the regulars of existing circles and movements, the ‘big family’ so to speak. We must reach out to young people, even the uncertain ones. For every twenty who refuse, there will be one activist who will rise up and inspire new vocations. […] The youth, the hope of the movement, must not stop: their enthusiasm is the guarantee of a better future. But above all, we must make ourselves known, break out, shatter the lukewarm isolation of groups, and even the pious retreat of the ‘great family of activists.’ Let us go to those who know nothing of us! Let us post, write, speak, shake the inertia of routine.”

=== Launch of Le Peuple breton ===
On January 4, 1964, the founding meeting of the Union démocratique bretonne (UDB) took place in Rennes. The party, composed of sixteen young members, used its initial membership fees to finance the publication of a monthly journal, Le Peuple breton, released a few days later. The title was taken from a quarterly of the same name published between 1947 and 1948 under the direction of Joseph Martray, who transferred the name to the UDB in 1964.

The typographic lead plate used for the masthead of Le Peuple breton was hand-carved by Ronan Leprohon and remained in use until September 1964, when it was slightly redesigned. The newspaper’s composition was carried out by Linarmor, a linotype company in Rennes, which provided the work free of charge. Printing was done on lightly coated paper by Mr. Becdelièvre, described as “a small Rennes artisan more accustomed to communion cards […] and business cards than to revolutionary newspapers.”

The first issue of Le Peuple breton consisted of four pages without illustrations. It included contributions from several founders of the Union démocratique bretonne (UDB), notably Jean-Yves Veillard, who signed as “Yann-Cheun,” Ronan Leprohon, whose name was frequently misspelled, and R. Dinan, the pseudonym of Rennes student Robert “Roparz” Debroise. Veillard served as publishing director until November 1969. The title was registered at his mother’s address in Rennes. During its first two years, the publication did not have its own bank account, instead using that of the party treasurer, Hervé Grall. The first issue was printed in 1,000 copies and sold for 60 centimes, a few days after January 4, at the entrance of the university restaurant on Rue de Fougères in Rennes.

This symbolic issue was later reproduced in a slightly reduced facsimile on matte paper for an anniversary of the newspaper. The facsimile is sometimes mistakenly presented as the original first issue in sales of Breton bibliophile material.

=== From newspaper to today’s magazine ===
For these politically engaged students, often from modest backgrounds and with limited financial resources, the four-page newspaper became their main instrument of activism, around which much of their activity was organized. Ronan Leprohon and Louis “Loeiz” Le Bec gave lectures in the principal Breton cities, which also served to attract new subscribers. The paper was sold in the streets whenever possible, particularly in Rennes and Brest, which ensured that nearly all copies were distributed. The monthly format provided sufficient time to include in-depth investigations and thematic dossiers, leading the editorial team from 1965 onward to publish extended studies such as Right and Left in Brittany, Clergy and Brittany, and West or Brittany. After a difficult start, Le Peuple breton reached financial stability and saw its circulation rise in connection with the events of May 1968, with 4,000 copies printed each month. Its readership was composed primarily of technicians and workers, largely from the middle class, a profile that continues to characterize much of its audience.

From 1971 to 1975, the editorial team published a series of dossiers on nature protection in Brittany. Written by Jakez Lefêvre and Jean-Yves Monnat of the University of Brest, these popular science articles addressed ecological and environmental issues and were presented across double-page spreads. In January 1973, the newspaper expanded to sixteen pages. Advances in printing technology, the partial introduction of color, and increased use of illustrations improved its presentation, while circulation rose to 8,000 copies in 1976. That same year, it adopted an A4 magazine format with 24 pages. Electoral campaigns in 1973, 1977, and 1978 contributed to its increased visibility. By the summer of 1977, the magazine had reached 32 pages, and in November 1979, circulation peaked at 15,000 copies. Although readership remained “in very limited circles,” the magazine exerted a notable influence at the time. In August 1981, the Belgian publisher Casterman released Bran Ruz, a comic book by artist Claude Auclair and writer Alain Deschamps, who acknowledged “the monthly Le Peuple breton (Pobl Vreizh).”

After the left’s victory in 1981 and the Socialist Party’s dominant role in regional politics, the Union démocratique bretonne faced a decline in membership and significant financial difficulties, a situation described as the party’s “desert crossing.” During this period, the magazine’s readership also fell, with sales dropping to 1,500 copies in 1983. In 1984, Marc Andro, secretary of the UDB political bureau, proposed that the magazine become the publication not only of the autonomist party but also of the broader Breton left, but the initiative had no impact. From the 1990s, and more clearly in the 2000s, the magazine gained readers again in connection with the renewed visibility of the UDB. In September 2005, it began printing in four-color process. Circulation reached 4,000 copies per month in 2013 and remained between 3,000 and 4,000 copies in 2023, depending on the source.

On January 2, 2024, for its sixtieth anniversary, Le Peuple breton featured the headline “A Living People,” accompanied by a front-page photograph of a smiling mixed-race child in traditional glazik dress carrying the Breton flag over his shoulder. The photograph, taken in 2015 in Quimper by Bruno Ansker during the Cornouaille Festival, prompted racist and hateful reactions after the issue was promoted on social media. Hundreds of xenophobic and extremist messages were posted and circulated within far-right networks, an episode covered by national and international media. In the following days, the cover went viral online, receiving over 5 million views on Twitter, (Note: Tweet published on January 2, 2024.) and generated a wave of messages supporting the magazine and its editorial decision.

== Editorial team ==
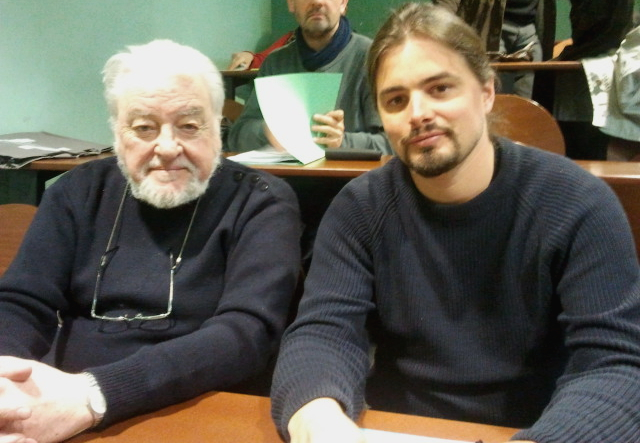
Ronan Leprohon and Gael Briand at a Sciences Po Rennes symposium on the UDB in April 2013.

The editorial team is composed entirely of volunteers, (Note: Apart from the proofreader, who is employed part-time.) with around one hundred regular contributors, including some professional journalists. More than half of the contributors are not members of the UDB. Regarding illustrations, the monthly publication sometimes uses material from agencies or professional photographers, but most of the images are provided by activists, who are present in the field and therefore “closest to the struggles.”

Most of the editorial cartoons are by Joël Auvin, known as Nono. Auvin is a recognized cartoonist who produces daily work for Le Télégramme and has illustrated numerous books. He has been contributing to Le Peuple breton for more than thirty years, with his first drawing published in the magazine in 1975.

List of Editors-in-Chief
Period	Name	Period	Name
January 1964 – November 1969	Jean-Yves “Yann-Cheun” Veillard	September 1984 – December 1992	Jean-Jacques Monnier
December 1969 – June 1973	Jean-Paul Gourmel	January 1993 – January 1999	Joël Guégan
July 1973 – May 1978	Roger “Ronan” Leprohon	February 1999 – November 2010	Roger “Ronan” Leprohon
June 1978 – August 1984	Jean Guegueniat	December 2010 – present	Gael Briand

One recurring contributor to the monthly is “Jean Roudaut.” This name does not correspond to a real individual but is a collective pseudonym used by writers who, due to professional activity or specific circumstances—such as military service—were unable to publish under their own name.

== Layout and sections ==
=== The front page: evolution of the masthead ===
Le Peuple breton’s front pages and mastheads have evolved over fifty years. Changes in the title of the newspaper, and later the magazine, coincided with the introduction of color printing and technological developments. The first hand-drawn logo was used for seventeen years, until September 1981. During this period, the typography was modified, including versions incorporating the UDB acronym, (Note: This three-letter acronym embedded on a black disc was the first logo of the Union démocratique bretonne.) which was removed from the “o” in “breton” in March 1974.

In October 1981, the first major change to the front page took place with the addition of an illustration in spot color. The design, a stylized dove with Celtic interlace, was based on the emblem of the “Breton People’s Festivals,” organized at the time by the UDB. By August 1984, the masthead retained the dove in reduced size, giving greater prominence to the typography. The words “le peuple” were frequently underlined with a bold color stroke.

In September 1991, the masthead was extended across the full width of the page for the first time, while the dove emblem was further reduced in size. Initially printed in black, the font soon appeared in color, often with shading. In June 1997, the shaded title was retained, but the masthead was repositioned in the upper left corner of the front page. This modification reduced the overall legibility of the title, and the dove emblem, though still present, became very small.

From October 2002, the logo retained its angled position, but the stylized bird was removed. The graphic design was significantly modified, featuring black and white lettering on a red background, contrasting with the polychrome front page.

The current model, introduced in September 2017 with a complete redesign of the magazine’s layout, features a masthead spanning the full width of the front page with the title in capital letters. The words “le peuple” appear in white against a red background, while “breton” is set directly on the front-page photograph, usually in black but occasionally in white depending on the image. For the first time, the subtitle Pobl Vreizh was added beneath the title, in a smaller but similar font and color scheme. The slogan “Today, to be free is to be informed” was also reinstated above the title.

=== The column L'invité ===
Although Le Peuple breton is the press organ of the UDB, it also includes contributions from other perspectives. This is particularly the case with the column “The Guest,” located on the inside front cover, which offers space for external voices. The column first appeared in September 1999, when journalist Roger Gicquel, former presenter of TF1’s evening news, began a regular collaboration with the magazine, contributing monthly until January 2003, for a total of 36 articles. (Note: With only one interruption, in May 2000.) From issue no. 469 onward, the column has featured a different guest author in each issue. Contributors have included Jean-Yves Le Drian, Irène Frachon, Pierre Péan, Goulc'han Kervella, Gérard Onesta, André Pochon, and Ronan Le Coadic.

From February 1968 to April 1969, journalist Morvan Lebesque contributed regularly to Le Peuple breton. Fañch Kerfraval (Note: Fañch Kerfraval is the pseudonym of François Ollivier. He met Morvan Lebesque in the late 1960s. At the time, he was a journalist at the daily Le Télégramme, a member of the UDB, and a driving force behind Le Peuple breton. (Note: Chartier 2007, p. 139)) described his work as “columns similar to those of Le Canard enchaîné [for which he also wrote]: same form, same length, and same tone. Only the approach changes. Moving away from issues ‘of’ society, he addresses those ‘of a’ society, the Breton society, and in this way, nonetheless reaches the dimension of the universal.” His collaboration lasted fourteen months, at a time when the newspaper had six pages and a print run of about 4,000 copies. Ronan Leprohon later remarked that “this shows the esteem in which Morvan Lebesque held the UDB.”

=== The column Iffig ===
Like many periodicals, the regional monthly includes a satirical column. It is titled “Iffig” (Note: According to the Breton speaker Fañch Broudig, the name “Iffig” contains “an old-style doubling of the ‘f’, when one would suffice.”) and is accompanied by a drawing described by journalist Fañch Broudig as depicting “a little laughing man, in old-fashioned bragoù-bras and small wooden clogs.” The column is humorous in tone and typically satirizes personalities or events when they do not appear to be “in line.”

=== The column Leurre de vérité ===
Since June 1994, the economist Yann Fiévet (Note: According to economist Christian Jacquiau, Yann Fiévet is an economist, a teacher of economics and social sciences at the Jean-Jacques-Rousseau high school in Sarcelles (Île-de-France). He is also a lecturer, writer, press columnist, and community leader.) has published a monthly column titled Leurre de vérité. According to journalist Naïri Nahapétian, he uses a “funny” and “bittersweet” style to “criticize the market dominance that rules our world.” His writings address themes such as the commodification of education and North–South relations, and occasionally focus on specific personalities. His short stories “summarize the absurdity of our society of spectacle or of corporate functioning.”

According to economist Christian Jacquiau, Yann Fiévet’s writings are pedagogical and often bear “evocative” titles, including Le Grenelle de l’emmerdement, Que sont nos intellectuels devenus?, La violence des pauvres ou encore Pourquoi ont-ils tué Jaurès ? The first column, published in 1994, was entitled Attristante Italie and appeared shortly after Silvio Berlusconi’s first appointment as head of the Italian government.

In 2009, the columnist stated that the tone of his column had “deliberately aimed to be resolutely radical” from the beginning, considering such radicalism necessary for the debate of ideas. According to Ronan Leprohon, this style sometimes prompted the editor-in-chief to respond to dissatisfied readers, (Note: “[…] there always remains a category of readers who find that reading Leurre de vérité saddens them too much, at a time when they need hope in order to act.” (Ronan Leprohon)) while others valued it “for its lucidity and for the salutary indignation it conveys.” That same year, political scientist Paul Ariès wrote the preface to a collection of Yann Fiévet’s columns and short stories published in Le Peuple breton between 2000 and 2009. Titled Le monde en pente douce, the volume was described by Ariès as useful for the “search for democracy” and as “a mine of information to […] help think about today’s struggles.”

=== The section Pobl Vreizh ===
In January 1970, the Union démocratique bretonne launched Pobl Vreizh, a monthly publication entirely in the Breton language, published in parallel with Le Peuple breton. The title of this second publication literally means “the people of Brittany.”

List of Editors-in-Chief of Pobl Vreizh
Period	Name
January 1970 – June 1973	Jean Jaouen
July 1973 – May 1976	Loig Kervoas
June 1976 – May 1982	Fañch Morvannou

The first issues of Pobl Vreizh, directed by Jean Jaouen, contained two pages presenting translations of Le Peuple breton’s editorial and its column “The Breton Problem from Brest to Nantes.” Printing was carried out by Abbé Le Gall in Pédernec, later known as Henry Printing. From issue no. 42 in July 1973, Loig Kervoas and a team of Trégor writers took over the monthly, transforming it into a newspaper independent from the French-language version, with six pages of articles, interviews, and comics in Breton. Only the subject of the editorial was shared between the two publications. The newspaper expanded to eight pages in August 1974. Initially printed in 1,000 copies, Pobl Vreizh reached an average circulation of 1,500 in the mid-1970s, with peaks of 2,000 in some months.

The newspaper continued under the direction of Fañch Morvannou from June 1976. In December 1977, it changed from tabloid format to A4 magazine format, offering twelve pages. After 140 issues, the periodical ceased publication in May 1982 due to the UDB’s financial difficulties.

From December 1984, articles in Breton reappeared in a monthly that combined the French and Breton editions. Pobl Vreizh became a two- to four-page supplement inserted in Le Peuple breton, to which it provided a subtitle, offering between four and eight pages of monolingual articles in Breton. It also included interdialectal articles.

== Financing, publication, and distribution ==
Le Peuple breton does not receive press subsidies distributed by the French state since 1942 to promote media pluralism. (Note: According to the magazine’s website, the publication “receives no subsidies other than that of the UDB.”) Its financing relies on single-issue sales, subscriptions, and subsidies from the Union démocratique bretonne (UDB). During its first two years of publication, the newspaper did not have its own bank account and used that of the UDB’s treasurer, Hervé Grall, reflecting the “extremely close symbiosis” between the party and the monthly at its beginnings. A separate postal checking account first appeared in the imprint in January 1966.

The publication is managed by an association under the 1901 law based in Saint-Brieuc, the Presses populaires de Bretagne. It is printed by Cloître imprimeurs in Saint-Thonan, Finistère. In 2013, the monthly had an average circulation of 4,000 copies. It is classified as a general regional periodical and publishes eleven issues per year: nine of 36 pages and two special 52-page issues in July–August and December.

In 2013, the magazine had 1,500 subscribers. It was distributed in 1,000 kiosks across Brittany, in Relay shops at regional train stations, and at Paris-Montparnasse. Members of the UDB also organized street sales at markets, events, demonstrations in Brittany, and in Paris train stations. (Note: See an advertising poster for Le Peuple breton created in the 1980s: Udbbrestbroleon.over-blog.org [archive].) Le Peuple breton published its 600th issue in January 2014.

The magazine also maintains an online presence. After initial attempts in 2007 and 2008, primarily publishing videos and slideshows on Dailymotion and YouTube, and the creation of a showcase website in July 2011, (Note: This showcase site, still visible online: Lepeuplebreton.wordpress.com.) the editorial team launched the first version of a structured website in March 2013 to present the magazine and provide article excerpts. (Note: The first site, Peuplebreton.net, was active from March 2013 to December 2014.) A second version, developed by Arnaud Mahé using free software, was launched in May 2015 under the domain www.lepeuplebreton.bzh. This version became a news site complementing the in-depth articles of the monthly print edition. In October 2015, following a photomontage published on the front page of the local weekly Le Ploërmelais, the National Union of Journalists (SNJ), then Libération, and later the Italian news site Globalist cited Le Peuple breton, which had reported the matter through this website. (Note: Extract from the SNJ press release: “The National Union of Journalists, the leading organization of the profession, commends the monthly Le Peuple breton which — in denouncing the fraud — cites the Charter of Professional Ethics of Journalists […]”) (Note: Ditaranto, Francesco (October 17, 2015). "Rifugiati: all'estrema destra francese non restano che i fotomontaggi" [Refugees: all that remains for the French far right are photomontages]. World (in Italian). Archived from the original on March 3, 2016. The first person to notice that something was wrong was Arno Mahé, editor of the monthly magazine Le Peuple Breton. The journalist did some calculations, retrieved the original photograph, and exposed the deception. Mahé cites the journalists' code of ethics, which states: “A journalist worthy of the name considers the alteration of documents, the distortion of facts, the theft of images, lies, and manipulation to be the most serious abuses of the profession.)

== The trials of Le Peuple breton ==
The regional monthly has been involved in several legal proceedings throughout its history. At its launch, following political tensions with the regional right, (Note: Cited by journalist Erwan Chartier, Leprohon specified: “[…] we had trouble with the Breton right, such as Fouéré, and with the French right, such as Marcellin.”) Ronan Leprohon contacted the editorial team of Le Canard enchaîné to request legal advice and obtain a lawyer. The satirical and investigative weekly then proposed that he work with “the pool of those who defend it,” a connection Leprohon had already maintained prior to gaining the support of Morvan Lebesque in 1968. (Note: Chartier 2007, p. 137)

=== Against the Société d'aménagement touristique du Morbihan (1970) ===
The first trial involving the publication occurred in 1970, six years after its founding. It was a defamation suit brought by Victor Golvan, then senator-mayor of Quiberon, general councilor of Morbihan, and president of the Société d'aménagement touristique du Morbihan (SATMOR), a semi-public company responsible for developing the Rhuys Peninsula. In several articles, Le Peuple breton criticized the speculative aspects of this operation, asserting that SATMOR expropriated land at low prices, developed it, and resold it to real estate developers. The case lasted six months, from July to December 1970, and involved extensive coverage in newspapers and press releases from the prefecture of Morbihan.

The hearing took place on November 12, 1970, and the Vannes criminal court delivered its judgment on November 25, ruling against the publication. SATMOR was awarded symbolic damages of one franc, and the editor-in-chief, Jean-Paul Gourmel, along with the article’s author, (Note: The incriminated article had been written by the Vannes section of the UDB.) were each fined one thousand francs. In their 1973 political science thesis, Jean-Claude Le Corre and Michel Nicolas noted that a subscription campaign had been launched prior to the verdict, raising 8,907.26 francs. According to them, support came particularly from residents of the Rhuys Peninsula, “among whom the Vannes section of the UDB had conducted intense propaganda.”

=== Against Les Presses bretonnes and the FN (1997) ===
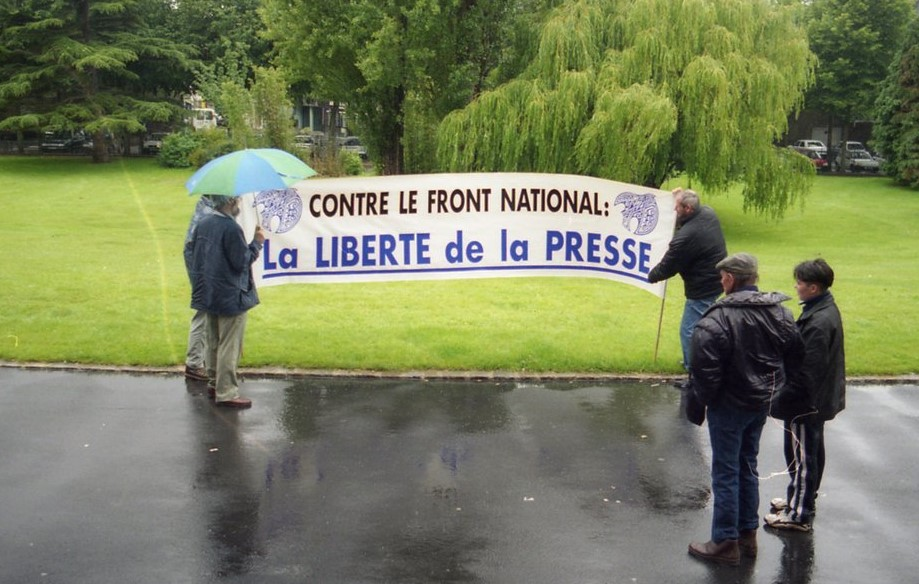
Banner displayed in front of the Saint-Brieuc courthouse during the trial on August 28, 1997.

In 1997, editor-in-chief Joël Guégan was prosecuted for defamation by the company Les Presses bretonnes. Founded in 1620 in Saint-Brieuc, this printing house was one of the oldest in Brittany. It had been acquired in 1993 by industrialist Fernand Le Rachinel, who was both a printer by trade and an executive and financier associated with the National Front (FN). In an article published in January 1997 entitled La triste fin d'une belle histoire : les Presses bretonnes dans les griffes du Front national, Le Peuple breton reported that the printing house had become “one of the satellite companies” of the far-right party. The article described the takeover and subsequent changes, listing several publications printed from 1995 onward connected to the FN or its leaders, including Jean-Marie Le Pen’s presidential program, a reissue of Terre en vue : feuilles de route des jeunes du Front national, Jean-Marie Le Pen raconte sa jeunesse ou encore L'Agenda Jean-Marie 1997. It also highlighted the printing of far-right periodicals such as Itinéraires and Revision. Itinéraires was directed by Jean Madiran, a pseudonym of a figure associated with collaboration during World War II, and Revision was directed by Alain Guionnet, carried the subtitle Le doux parfum de l'interdit, and presented revisionist and antisemitic content.

In this case, Les Presses bretonnes sought two million francs in damages from the magazine, claiming it had created an “amalgam” between the printing house and the far-right political party. During the trial, the association network Ras l’front, activists from the Alternative rouge et verte (AREV), and the editorial team of the weekly Bretagne-Info expressed support for the magazine. In August, the criminal court of Saint-Brieuc acquitted the editor of Le Peuple breton. According to a brief published in Libération, the court cited “the seriousness of the journalistic investigation.”

== Homonymous media ==
In the 19th and 20th centuries, three other publications also used the title Le Peuple breton. In his book Deux siècles de presse écrite en Bretagne, journalist and former AFP Rennes bureau chief Marcel Leguen described the first two as political publications: one was a tri-weekly published in Brest in 1870, and the other a monthly published in Quimper in 1932. (Note: Leguen 2002, p. 107) (Note: Leguen 2002, p. 111) A third publication with the same title was issued from 1947 to 1949 under the direction of journalist Joseph Martray and distributed in Brittany.

=== Le Peuple breton (1870) ===
Alexandre Bouet, the son of the mayor of Lambézellec, was described by Marcel Leguen as a “talented writer.” In 1830, he founded in Brest the bi-weekly, later tri-weekly, Le Finistère, a “political, maritime, commercial and literary newspaper,” as indicated by its subtitle. Its editor-in-chief was Émile Souvestre, who demonstrated a “freedom of tone toward the Navy.” In response, Bouet left the title and in 1832 created Le Brestois, a tri-weekly with the motto “Liberty and Public Order” and the subtitle “Political, Commercial, Maritime and Literary Newspaper.” (Note: Leguen 2002, p. 105)

In 1833, the two titles merged to form the tri-weekly L’Armoricain, published in Brest. In its first issue on August 1, 1833, the paper referred to the Charter of 1830, describing it as “our ark of salvation.” Its subtitle was initially that of Le Brestois before changing to Journal of Brest and Finistère. The format evolved from tabloid (44 × 28 cm) to daily (55 × 36 cm). L’Armoricain published legal announcements and continued circulation for 36 years, ending with issue no. 5630 on December 30, 1869. (Note: Leguen 2002, p. 106)

In 1870, L’Armoricain was renamed Le Peuple breton. The publication continued in Brest as a tri-weekly and retained its initial subtitle, Journal politique, commercial, maritime et littéraire. Fernand de Rodays served as editor-in-chief. Printed in daily format (56 × 40 cm), the newspaper was issued from January 4, 1870 (no. 1) to September 29, 1870 (no. 104).

=== Le Peuple breton (1932) ===
The second periodical of the same name was a monthly that published three issues from June to August 1932. It was published in Quimper and printed in Rennes, with a tabloid format of 38 × 28 cm.

=== Le Peuple breton (1947–1949) ===
On October 1, 1947, a third publication with the same name was launched by journalist and Breton activist Joseph Martray. It was a monthly review (Note: In his dictionary of the Emsav, G. Cadiou incorrectly indicates that it was a quarterly.) published in La Baule-Escoublac. Its subtitle initially read Politique, social, économique, international puis Politique, économique, social, culturel, international. According to journalist Clarisse Lucas, the publication aimed “to advance the idea of European federalism and the regionalization of France.” In his first editorial, the editor-in-chief wrote, “What then is the Breton people waiting for? It wants an organ of union and action. Cultural efforts must not be neglected, but above all, it is necessary to support a broader movement — economic, social and administrative — which takes root in the people, not only in the elite.” Journalist Georges Cadiou interpreted this as an effort “to revive the political movement.” The final issue was published in May 1949, shortly before Martray became involved with the Comité d’étude et de liaison des intérêts bretons (CELIB). In 1964, Martray permitted the Union démocratique bretonne (UDB) to use the title Le Peuple breton for its newspaper while retaining ownership of the name.

== See also ==
- Editorial independence
- Freedom of the press
- Alternative media

== Bibliography ==
- Choplin, Cédric (2014). "Pobl Vreizh, le petit frère bretonnant du Peuple breton" [Pobl Vreizh, the Breton-speaking little brother of Le Peuple Breton]. L'Union démocratique bretonne : un parti autonomiste dans un État unitaire [The Breton Democratic Union: an autonomist party in a unitary state]. Histoire (in French). Rennes: Presses universitaires de Rennes (PUR). ISBN 978-2-7535-3262-5.
- Thomas, Mannaig (2014). "La poésie engagée-enragée des écrivains de l'UDB (1967-1974)" [The angry, politically engaged poetry of the UDB writers (1967–1974)]. L'Union démocratique bretonne : un parti autonomiste dans un État unitaire [The Breton Democratic Union: an autonomist party in a unitary state]. Histoire (in French). Rennes: Presses universitaires de Rennes (PUR). ISBN 978-2-7535-3262-5.
- Cadiou, Georges (2013). Emsav : dictionnaire critique, historique et biographique : le mouvement breton de A à Z [Emsav: critical, historical, and biographical dictionary: the Breton movement from A to Z] (in French). Spézet: Coop Breizh. ISBN 978-2-84346-574-1. Archived from the original on October 30, 2013.
- Lucas, Clarisse (2011). Le lobby breton : Lobi Breizh [The Breton lobby: Lobi Breizh]. Les enquêteurs associés (in French). Paris: Nouveau monde. ISBN 978-2-84736-611-2. Archived from the original on March 3, 2016.
- Fiévet, Yann (2009). Le monde en pente douce : chronique d'un siècle mal commençant [The world on a gentle slope: chronicle of a century that got off to a bad start] (in French). Villeurbanne: Golias. ISBN 978-2-35472-017-9.
- Nicolas, Michel (2007). Histoire de la revendication bretonne [History of the Breton claim] (in French). Spézet: Coop Breizh. ISBN 978-2-84346-312-9.
- Chartier, Erwan (2007). Morvan Lebesque : le masque et la plume d'un intellectuel en quête de Bretagne [Morvan Lebesque: the mask and the pen of an intellectual in search of Brittany] (in French). Spézet: Coop Breizh. ISBN 978-2-84346-305-1.
- Friant, Grégory (2006). L'Union démocratique bretonne sous la République gaullienne au travers son organe de presse : de la création du parti aux premiers combats politiques (1964-1969) [The Breton Democratic Union under the Gaullist Republic through its press organ: from the party's creation to its first political battles (1964-1969)]. Mémoire / Unité de formation et de recherche (UFR) en histoire (in French). Brest: Université de Bretagne occidentale (UBO).
- Leguen, Marcel (2002). Deux siècles de presse écrite en Bretagne [Two centuries of print media in Brittany] (in French). Spézet: Coop Breizh. ISBN 2-84346-115-4.
- Monnier, Jean-Jacques (1998). Histoire de l'Union démocratique bretonne [History of the Breton Democratic Union]. Les cahiers du Peuple breton (in French). Lannion: Presses populaires de Bretagne. ISSN 1281-7783.
- Le Corre, Jean-Claude; Nicolas, Michel (1973). L'Union démocratique bretonne : contribution à l'étude de l'Emsav [The Breton Democratic Union: contribution to the EMSAV study]. Mémoire / Diplôme d'études supérieures (DES) de science politique (in French). Rennes: Université de Rennes 1 / Unité d'enseignement et de recherche (UER) de sciences juridiques.
