= Elections in Brittany =

This page gathers the results of elections in Brittany.

== Regional elections ==
=== Last regional election ===
In the last regional election, which took place on March 21 and March 28, 2004, Jean-Yves Le Drian (PS) was elected President, defeating incumbent Josselin de Rohan (UMP).

Candidate	Party	Votes (Round One)	% (Round One)	Votes (Round Two)	% (Round Two)
Jean-Yves Le Drian	PS-PCF-PRG	521,980	38.48%	841,004	58.79%
Josselin de Rohan (incumbent)	UMP	347,221	25.60%	589,625	41.21%
Bruno Joncour	UDF	150,050	11.06%	-	-
Pascale Loget	Les Verts-UDB-Frankiz Breizh	131,521	9.70%	-	-
Brigitte Neveux	FN	114,883	8.47%	-	-
Françoise Dubu	LCR-LO	64,805	4.78%	-	-
Lionel David	MNR	25,992	1.92%	-	-
Total		1,356,460	100.00%	1,430,611	100.00%
