= Pochon (surname) =

Pochon is a surname. Notable people with the surname include:

- Alfred Pochon (1878–1959), Swiss musician
- André Pochon (born 1931), French farmer
- Élisabeth Pochon (born 1955), French politician
- Hans Pochon (1900–1977), Swiss entomologist
