= Vaugrenard =

Vaugrenard is a French surname. Notable people with the surname include:

- Benoît Vaugrenard (born 1982), French cyclist
- Yannick Vaugrenard (born 1950), French politician
