= Yannick Jadot =

French environmentalist and politician (born 1967)

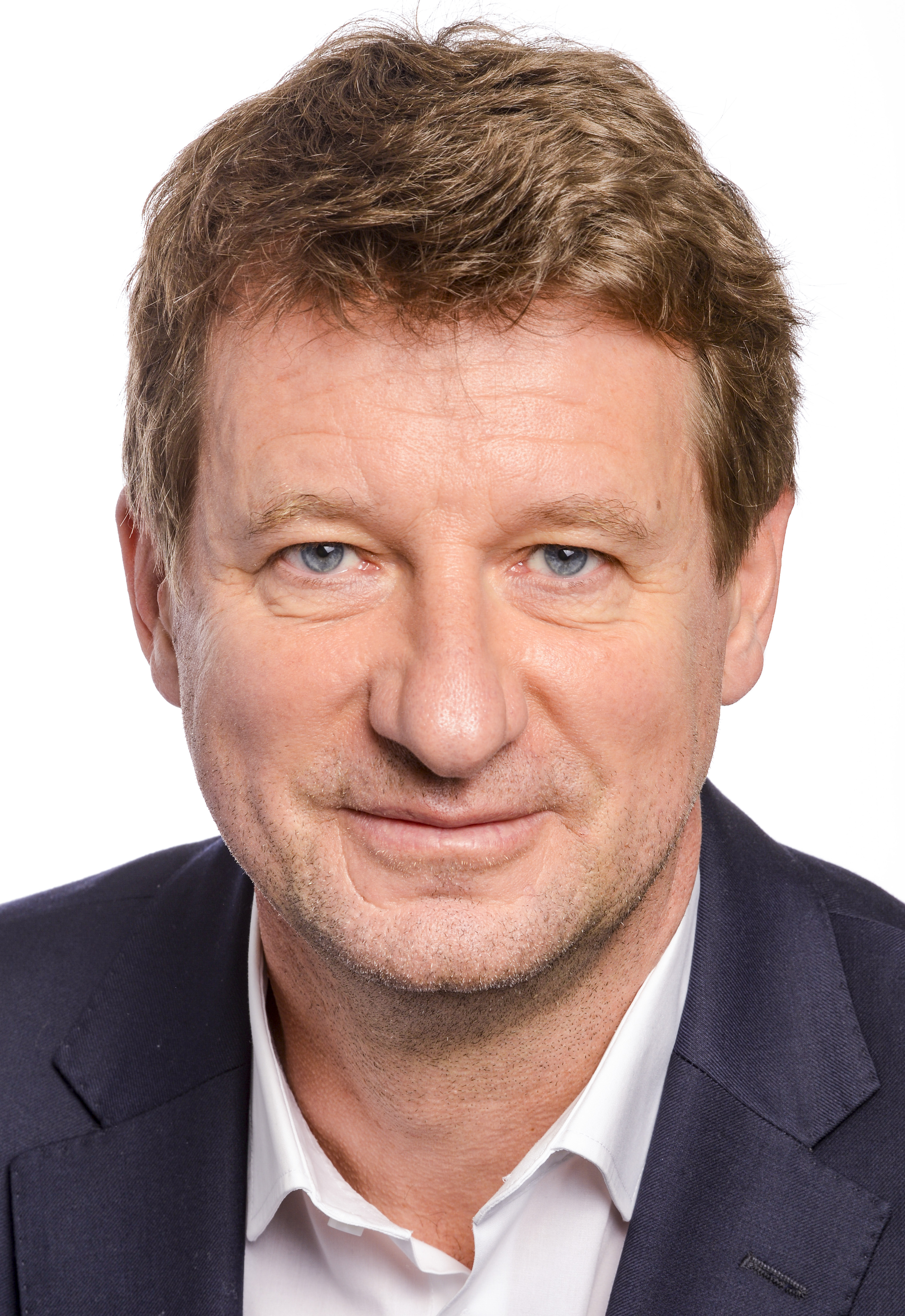

Senator for Paris
- Incumbent
- Assumed office 2 October 2023

Member of the European Parliament
- In office 14 July 2009 – 23 September 2023
- Constituency: West France (2009–2019); France (2019–2023)

Personal details
- Born: 27 July 1967 (age 59) Clacy-et-Thierret, France
- Party: The Ecologists (2010–present)
- Other political affiliations: The Greens (1999–2010)
- Domestic partner: Isabelle Saporta
- Education: Paris Dauphine University

Yannick Jadot (French pronunciation: [janik ʒado]; born 27 July 1967) is a French environmental activist and politician who ran for President of France in 2022, placing sixth with 4.6% of the vote. A member of The Ecologists (LÉ), he was elected to represent Paris in the Senate in 2023.

A member of the Greens from 1999, Jadot was a campaign director for Greenpeace France from 2002 to 2008. He headed his party's list for the West France constituency in the 2009 European Parliament election, in which he was elected to the European Parliament, where he held a seat until 2023. Following his party's primary, he was nominated as the Europe Ecology – The Greens (EELV) candidate in the 2017 French presidential election, before withdrawing and endorsing Socialist Party candidate Benoît Hamon. The EELV national list he headed in the 2019 European election came third with 13.5% of the vote.

In the 2021 Greens primary, Jadot was elected as the candidate of the Ecologist Pole alliance for the 2022 presidential election, in which he received 4.6% of the first-round vote. He was elected a Senator for Paris in the 2023 Senate election; he was sworn in on 2 October 2023, ending his term in the European Parliament, where he was succeeded by Lydie Massard.

== Early career ==
As an environmentalist and humanitarian, Jadot coordinated Greenpeace actions in France between 2002 and 2008, also heading the Alliance pour la planète and serving as a key player in the 2008 Grenelle Environnement talks.

== Political career ==
=== Member of the European Parliament, 2009–present ===
In 2009, Jadot announced that he was leaving Greenpeace to lead the Europe Ecology list in the West France constituency in the 2009 European elections. His list won 16.65% of the vote and he was elected to the European Parliament, along with Nicole Kiil-Nielsen. He was reelected to the same constituency during the 2014 European elections.

In parliament, Jadot first served on the Committee on International Trade from 2009 until 2019. Since 2019, he has been a member of the Committee on the Environment, Public Health and Food Safety. In this capacity, he has been the parliament’s lead rapporteur on CO_{2} standards for new trucks in the European market.

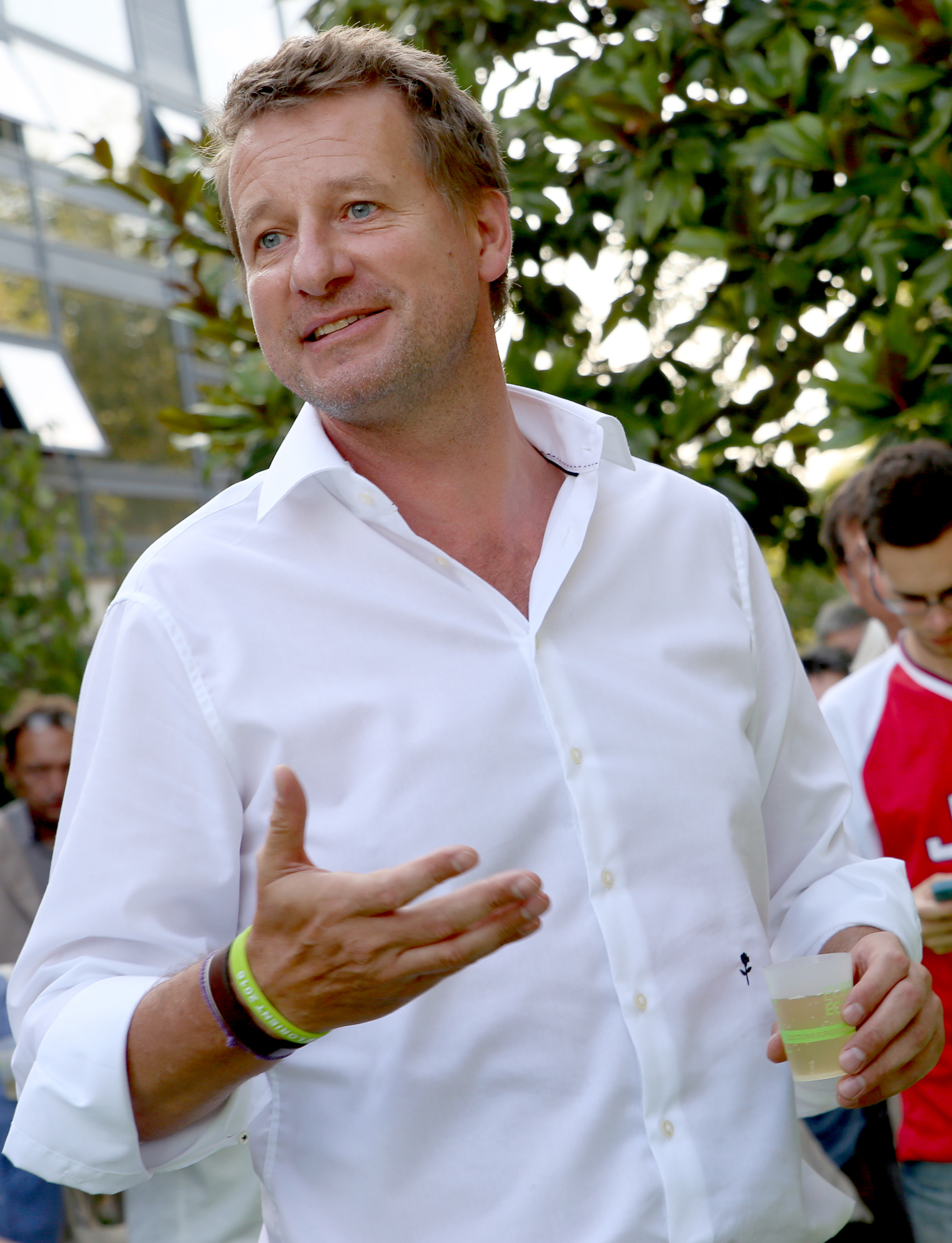
Yannick Jadot in 2016

In addition to his committee assignments, Jadot was part of the Parliament's delegations to the countries of Southeast Asia and the Association of Southeast Asian Nations (2014–2019), and to the ACP–EU Joint Parliamentary Assembly (2009–2011). He is also a member of the European Parliament Intergroup on the Welfare and Conservation of Animals and the European Parliament Intergroup on LGBT Rights.

In 2016, Jadot was selected by Europe Ecology – The Greens (EELV) to stand as their candidate in the 2017 French presidential election, after defeating fellow MEP Michèle Rivasi in the second round of primary voting. Though Jadot secured 496 sponsorships just before the opening of the signature collection period, he announced that he would withdraw his candidacy and endorsed Socialist nominee Benoît Hamon, the pair having agreed on a common platform. Their alliance was consummated when EELV primary voters approved the agreement on 26 February 2017.

Jadot ran for and was elected to the Senate in the 2023 French Senate election to represent the Paris constituency. He was replaced in the European Parliament by Lydie Massard.

=== Role in national politics ===
On 30 January 2021, Jadot announced that he would be running as a candidate in the 2022 French presidential election. In the primaries, he won 51.03% of the party's votes, beating Sandrine Rousseau. In the first round of the election on 10 April 2022, he was eliminated after he received 4.6% of the overall votes, coming in 6th place behind Valérie Pecresse.

== Political positions ==
Jadot said in April 2022 that he wanted to put a "bonus/malus" system on "all taxation", from VAT to wealth tax (ISF) which he intends to "restore" and "to strengthen".

== Publications ==
Jadot's 2014 book, Climat, la guerre de l'ombre, was illustrated by comic artist and author Léo Quievreux.
