= Morbihan's 5th constituency =

Constituency of the National Assembly of France

5th constituency of Morbihan
- inline Constituency of the National Assembly of France

- Constituency in Department

- Location of Morbihan in France
- Deputy: Lysiane Métayer; RE
- Department: Morbihan
- Cantons: (pre-2015) Groix, Lanester, Lorient Centre, Lorient Nord, Lorient Sud, Ploemeur

The 5th constituency of Morbihan is a French legislative constituency in the Morbihan département, consisting mostly of the town of Lorient. Like the other 576 French constituencies, it elects one MP using the two-round system, with a run-off if no candidate receives over 50% of the vote in the first round.

== Historic representation ==
Election	Member	Party
1988	Jean-Yves Le Drian	PS
1991	Pierre Victoria	PS
1993	Michel Godard	UDF
1997	Jean-Yves Le Drian	PS
2002	Jean-Yves Le Drian	PS
2007	Françoise Olivier-Coupeau	PS
2011	Gwendal Rouillard	PS
2012	Gwendal Rouillard	PS
2017	Gwendal Rouillard	LREM
2022	Lysiane Métayer	RE

== Election results ==
=== 2024 ===
Legislative Election 2024: Morbihan's 5th constituency
Party	Candidate	Votes	%	±%
RE (Ensemble)	Lysiane Métayer	19,081	34.60	+11.64
LÉ–EELV (NFP)	Damien Girard (politician)	19,612	35.56	+4.07
LO	Blandine Pierron	1,067	1.93	N/A
RN	Aurélie Le Goff	15,386	27.90	+14.97
Turnout		55,146	97.46	+46.39
Registered electors		80,820		
2nd round result
LÉ–EELV	Damien Girard (politician)	21,760	38.88	+3.32
RE	Lysiane Métayer	19,117	34.15	−0.45
RN	Aurélie Le Goff	15,096	26.97	−0.93
Turnout		55,973	97.69	+0.23
Registered electors		80,823		
LÉ–EELV gain from RE				

=== 2022 ===
Legislative Election 2022: Morbihan's 5th constituency
Party	Candidate	Votes	%	±%
EELV (NUPÉS)	Damien Girard (politician)	12,916	31.47	+9.31
LREM (Ensemble)	Lysiane Métayer	9,423	22.96	-19.74
HOR	Ronan Loas*	8,785	21.41	N/A
RN	David Megel	5,307	12.93	+3.98
REC	Thibault Perrin	1,890	4.61	N/A
UDB	Gael Briand	1,360	3.31	N/A
Others	N/A	1,360	3.31	
Turnout		41,041	51.07	−0.59
2nd round result
LREM (Ensemble)	Lysiane Métayer	19,666	51.35	-11.76
EELV (NUPÉS)	Damien Girard (politician)	18,634	48.65	+11.76
Turnout		38,300	50.08	+6.54
LREM hold				

* Horizons dissident

=== 2017 ===
Candidate	Label	First round		Second round	
Candidate	Label	Votes	%	Votes	%
Gwendal Rouillard	REM	17,367	42.70	19,756	63.11
Alexandre Scheuer	FI	4,956	12.18	11,549	36.89
David Drégoire	LR	4,492	11.04		
Christian Mouton	FN	3,642	8.95		
Teaki Dupont	UDI	3,150	7.74		
Damien Girard (politician)	ECO	2,601	6.39		
Delphine Alexandre	PCF	1,460	3.59		
Gaël Briand	REG	895	2.20		
Aurore Boisvert	DIV	548	1.35		
Allain Le Boudouil	ECO	382	0.94		
Mathieu Piro	EXG	362	0.89		
Laurence Hermann	DVD	318	0.78		
Florence Kempeners	DVG	290	0.71		
Jordy Mazé	DIV	211	0.52		
Votes		40,674	100.00	31,305	100.00
Valid votes		40,674	97.56	31,305	89.08
Blank votes		823	1.97	2,977	8.47
Null votes		195	0.47	860	2.45
Turnout		41,692	51.66	35,142	43.54
Abstentions		39,016	48.34	45,562	56.46
Registered voters		80,708		80,704	
Source: Ministry of the Interior

=== 2012 ===
Legislative Election 2012: Morbihan's 5th constituency
Party	Candidate	Votes	%	±%
PS	Gwendal Rouillard	19,864	43.75	+9.49
UMP	Brigitte Melin	11,726	25.83	+1.00
FN	Joëlle Bergeron	4,775	10.52	+7.91
FG	Joël Gallais	3,234	7.12	+3.42
EELV	Jean-Paul Aucher	2,594	5.71	+1.77
UDB	Yann Syz	912	2.01	+0.56
MoDem	Florence Donato-Lehuede	910	2.00	N/A
Others	N/A	1,386	-	−
Turnout		45,401	56.54	−3.87
2nd round result
PS	Gwendal Rouillard	26,905	62.35	+7.08
UMP	Brigitte Melin	16,246	37.65	−7.08
Turnout		43,151	53.73	−7.20
PS hold				

=== 2007 ===
Legislative Election 2007: Morbihan's 5th constituency
Party	Candidate	Votes	%	±%
PS	Françoise Olivier-Coupeau	16,320	34.26	−1.58
UMP	Maria Colas	11,829	24.83	+8.96
NM	Fabrice Loher	7,346	15.42	N/A
DVD	Jean Le Bot	1,926	4.04	N/A
LV	Jean-Paul Archer	1,879	3.94	−0.50
PCF	Thierry Goyet	1,764	3.70	−1.51
LCR	Stéphanie Chauvin	1,285	2.70	+1.26
FN	Daniel Bergeron	1,245	2.61	−4.76
Others	N/A	4,046	-	−
Turnout		49,160	60.41	−2.25
2nd round result
PS	Françoise Olivier-Coupeau	26,433	55.27	+4.88
UMP	Maria Colas	21,395	44.73	N/A
Turnout		49,585	60.93	−0.92
PS hold				

=== 2002 ===
Legislative Election 2002: Morbihan's 5th constituency
Party	Candidate	Votes	%	±%
PS	Jean-Yves Le Drian	17,644	35.84	+3.08
UDF	Fabrice Loher	10,487	21.30	N/A
UMP	Dominique Yvon	7,812	15.87	−11.24
FN	Daniel Bergeron	3,627	7.37	−4.57
PCF	Daniel Gilles	2,563	5.21	−7.02
LV	Jean-Paul Aucher	2,186	4.44	+1.31
DVD	Jacques Bellanger	1,134	2.30	−0.22
Others	N/A	3,780	-	−
Turnout		50,171	62.66	−0.18
2nd round result
PS	Jean-Yves Le Drian	24,015	50.39	−6.40
UDF	Fabrice Loher	23,643	49.61	N/A
Turnout		49,650	61.85	−4.82
PS hold				

=== 1997 ===
Legislative Election 1997: Morbihan's 5th constituency
Party	Candidate	Votes	%	±%
PS	Jean-Yves Le Drian	15,851	32.76	
RPR	Catherine Giquel	13,117	27.11	
PCF	Daniel Gilles	5,918	12.23	
FN	Carol Mettetal	5,775	11.94	
LV	Dominique Jeannes	1,516	3.13	
LO	Cyril Le Bail	1,325	2.74	
DVD	Jacques Bellanger	1,220	2.52	
REG	Joël Guegan	1,219	2.52	
Others	N/A	2,446	-	
Turnout		50,365	62.84	
2nd round result
PS	Jean-Yves Le Drian	28,625	56.79	
RPR	Catherine Giquel	21,777	43.21	
Turnout		53,431	66.67	
PS gain from UDF				

== Sources ==
- Official results of French elections from 1998: "Résultats électoraux officiels en France" (in French).
