= Editorial independence =

Freedom of editors to make decisions

Editorial independence refers to the freedom of journalists and media organizations to make content decisions—such as what to report, how to report it, and when to report it—without external influence from owners, governments, advertisers, or other outside forces. It is a sacrosanct principle for independent media organizations.

Countries that want to foster an independent media ecosystem and protect editorial independence often pursue laws against concentration of media ownership and provide subsidies for independent media.

== Discussion ==
Editorial independence has been at the center of debates when labeling outlets as state media. Journalists and public broadcasters with editorial independence object to labeling that focuses on whether or not they get funding from a government as misleading audiences to believe that it impacts their coverage. Before Elon Musk, Twitter did not label media like The BBC as 'state-affiliated' because of that independence explaining that the independence is what readers really wanted to know. Elon Musk's move to change that in 2023 drew backlash from critics arguing it represented a false equivalence between outlets tightly controlled by the state and those free to criticize their own government. YouTube also faced similar criticisms in 2018 and 2019 for its label attempts that focused on funding instead of editorial independence. The transition away from editorial independence also led to protests in Hungary in 2024.

Student publications also have a range of editorial independence from their schools, some of which try to prevent any negative publicity that the student journalists might uncover.

The Washington Post and its owner Jeff Bezos received criticism from some staff and journalism pundits for spiking a 2024 endorsement of Kamala Harris as an example of a lack of editorial independence.

== See also ==
- Academic freedom
- Freedom of the press, the freedom from interference by governments
- Media manipulation
- Objectivity (journalism)
- Media policy
- Le Peuple breton

=== Other functions often given independence ===
- Central bank independence
- Civil control of the military
- Civil service independence
- Judicial independence
- Open government
- Separation of church and state
