= Fabrice Loher =

French politician (born 1966)

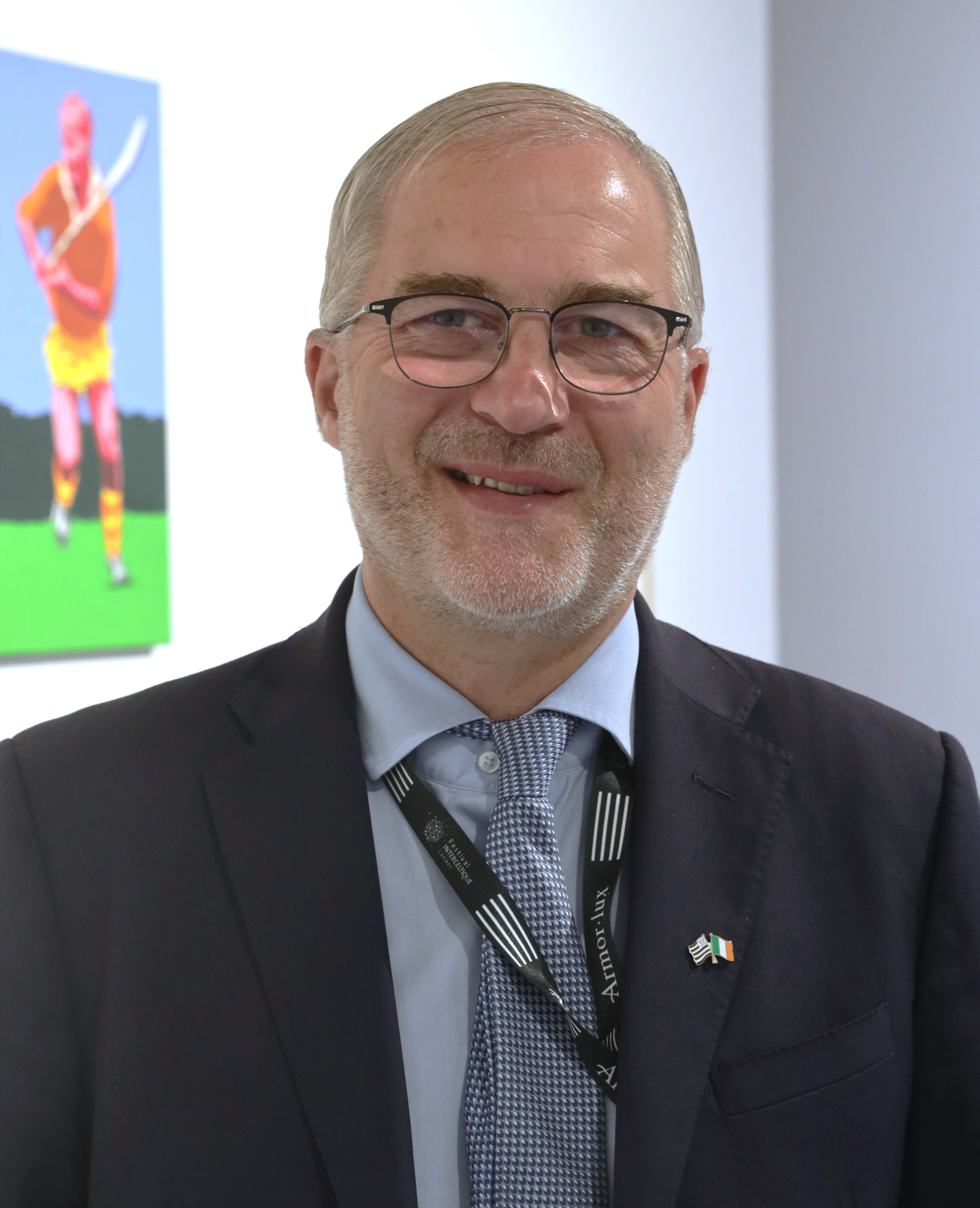
- Loher in 2023

Minister Delegate for the Sea and Fisheries
- In office 21 September 2024 – 23 December 2024
- Prime Minister: Michel Barnier
- Preceded by: Hervé Berville (as Secretary of State for the Sea and Biodiversity)
- Succeeded by: Agnès Pannier-Runacher

Mayor of Lorient
- Incumbent
- Assumed office 5 July 2020
- Preceded by: Norbert Métairie

Personal details
- Born: 29 December 1966 (age 59)
- Party: Union of Democrats and Independents (since 2012)
- Other political affiliations: Democratic Movement (2007–2012); Union for French Democracy (1986–2007)

Fabrice Loher (born 29 December 1966) is a French politician of the Union of Democrats and Independents who has been serving as mayor of Lorient since the In the 2020 municipal elections.

== Political career ==
In the 2002 and 2007 legislative elections, Loher was a candidate for Morbihan's 5th constituency.

From September to December 2024, Loher briefly served as Minister Delegate for the Sea and Fisheries in the government of Prime Minister Michel Barnier.
