= West France (European Parliament constituency) =

Former European Parliament constituency

- European Parliament constituency
- Location among the 2014 constituencies

- Shown within France
- Member state: France
- Created: 2004
- Dissolved: 2019
- MEPs: 10 (2004-2009); 9 (2009-2019)

West France was a European Parliament constituency. Created in 2003, it initially consisted of the French regions of Brittany and Pays de la Loire, with four departments of Nouvelle-Aquitaine (Charente, Charente-Maritime, Deux-Sèvres, and Vienne) being added in 2016. West France was made up of 6,177,138 electors in 2009.

From 2004 until 2009, the constituency elected 10 Members of the European Parliament, while from 2009 until its abolition in 2019 it elected only 9.

== Members of the European Parliament ==
Election	MEP (party)	MEP (party)	MEP (party)	MEP (party)	MEP (party)	MEP (party)	MEP (party)	MEP (party)	MEP (party)	MEP (party)
2004	Roselyne Lefrançois (PS)	Bernard Poignant (PS)	Stéphane Le Foll (PS)	Yannick Vaugrenard (PS)	Bernadette Vergnaud (PS)	Philippe Morillon (UDF/ MoDem)	Philippe de Villiers (MPF/ Libertas)	Marie-Hélène Aubert (Green)	Ambroise Guellec (UMP)	Élisabeth Morin-Chartier (UMP /LR)
2007	Roselyne Lefrançois (PS)	Bernard Poignant (PS)	Stéphane Le Foll (PS)	Yannick Vaugrenard (PS)	Bernadette Vergnaud (PS)	Philippe Morillon (UDF/ MoDem)	Philippe de Villiers (MPF/ Libertas)	Marie-Hélène Aubert (Green)	Ambroise Guellec (UMP)	Élisabeth Morin-Chartier (UMP /LR)
2009	9 seats	Bernard Poignant (PS)	Stéphane Le Foll (PS)	Yannick Jadot (EELV)	Nicole Kiil-Nielsen (EELV)	Sylvie Goulard (MoDem)	Philippe de Villiers (MPF/ Libertas)	Agnès Le Brun (UMP)	Alain Cadec (UMP /LR)	Élisabeth Morin-Chartier (UMP /LR)
2014	9 seats	Isabelle Thomas (PS)	Emmanuel Maurel (PS)	Yannick Jadot (EELV)	Jean Arthuis (UDI)	Joelle Bergeron (FN)	Gilles Lebreton (FN)	Marc Joulaud (UMP /LR)	Alain Cadec (UMP /LR)	Élisabeth Morin-Chartier (UMP /LR)
2017	9 seats	Isabelle Thomas (PS)	Emmanuel Maurel (PS)	Yannick Jadot (EELV)	Jean Arthuis (UDI)	Joelle Bergeron (FN)	Gilles Lebreton (FN)	Marc Joulaud (UMP /LR)	Alain Cadec (UMP /LR)	Élisabeth Morin-Chartier (UMP /LR)

== Results ==
=== 2009 ===
European Election 2009: West
List	Candidates	Votes	Of total (%)	± from prev.
UMP	Christophe Béchu; Élisabeth Morin; Alain Cadec	680,829	27.16	
PS	Bernadette Vergnaud; Stéphane Le Foll	433,309	17.29	
EELV	Yannick Jadot; Nicole Kiil-Nielsen	417,449	16.65	
Libertas	Philippe de Villiers	257,437	10.27	
MoDem	Sylvie Goulard	212,524	8.48	
NPA	None	128,641	5.13	
FG	None	114,755	4.58	
AEI	None	93,391	3.73	
FN	None	76,645	3.06	
PB	None	32,805	1.31	
LO	None	31,284	1.25	
DLR	None	14,748	0.59	
Liberal Alternative	None	4,371	0.18	
Europe Démocratie Espéranto	None	4,215	0.17	
Europe décroissance	None	1,374	0.06	
AR	None	967	0.04	
Rassemblement pour l'Initiative Citoyenne	None	581	0.02	
Union des gens	None	494	0.02	
Newropeans	None	357	0.02	
Communists	None	518	0.02	
Turnout		2,616,994	42.36	

=== 2004 ===
Brackets indicate the number of votes per seat won.

European Election 2004: West
List	Candidates	Votes	Of total (%)	± from prev.
PS	Stéphane Le Foll; Bernard Poignant; Marie-Line Reynaud; Yannick Vaugrenard; Bernadette Vergnaud	789,168 (157,833.6)	30.93	
UMP	Roselyne Bachelot-Narquin; Ambroise Guellec	377,984 (188,992)	14.81	
MPF	Philippe de Villiers	315,481	12.36	
UDF	Philippe Morillon	298,871	11.71	
LV	Marie-Hélène Aubert	195,546	7.66	
FN	None	143,494	5.62	
PCF	None	104,632	4.10	
GE	None	79,529	3.10	
Far left	None	58,800	2.30	
PRG	None	55,890	2.19	
CPNT	None	50,825	1.99	
La France d'en bas	None	33,787	1.32	
Rassemblement des Contribuables Français	None	19,074	0.75	
Workers' Party	None	18,361	0.72	
Eŭropo Demokratio Esperanto	None	4,910	0.19	
Vivre mieux avec l'Europe	None	3,112	0.12	
AR	None	1,874	0.07	
Parti Fédéraliste	None	305	0.01	
Parti des Socioprofessionnels	None	78	0.00	
France Unie	None	76	0.00	
Pôle des Libertés	None	66	0.00	
Turnout		2,551,863	45.12	

== See also ==
- European Parliament election results for France in 2004
