= Gwendal Rouillard =

French politician

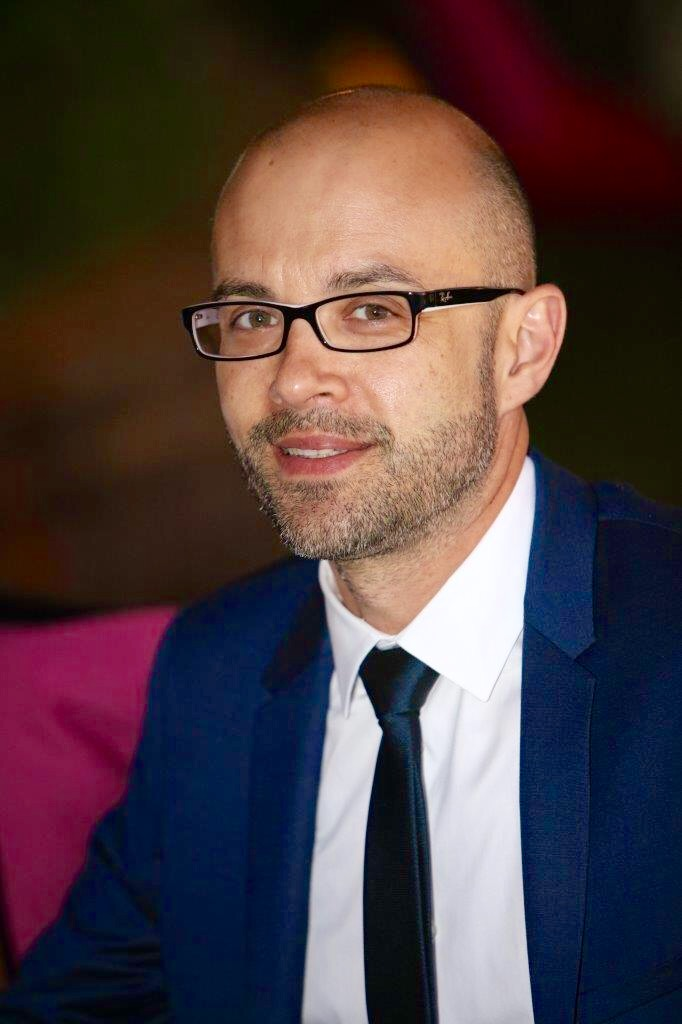

Member of the National Assembly for Morbihan's 5th constituency
- In office 5 May 2011 – 2022
- Preceded by: Françoise Olivier-Coupeau

Personal details
- Born: 20 April 1976 (age 50) Pontivy, France
- Party: PS (1998-2017); LREM (since 2017)
- Education: University of Southern Brittany

Gwendal Rouillard (born 20 April 1976) is a French politician of La République En Marche! (LREM) (from 2017) who served as a member of the French National Assembly from 2011 (originally as socialist) to 2022, representing the department of Morbihan.

== Political career ==
In parliament, Roullard served on the Defence Committee since 2011. In addition to his committee assignments, he chaired the French-Sudanese Parliamentary Friendship Group and was part of the parliamentary working group on Libya.

In July 2019, Rouillard voted in favour of the French ratification of the European Union's Comprehensive Economic and Trade Agreement (CETA) with Canada.

== See also ==
- 2017 French legislative election
