= Alain Cadec =

French politician (born 1953)

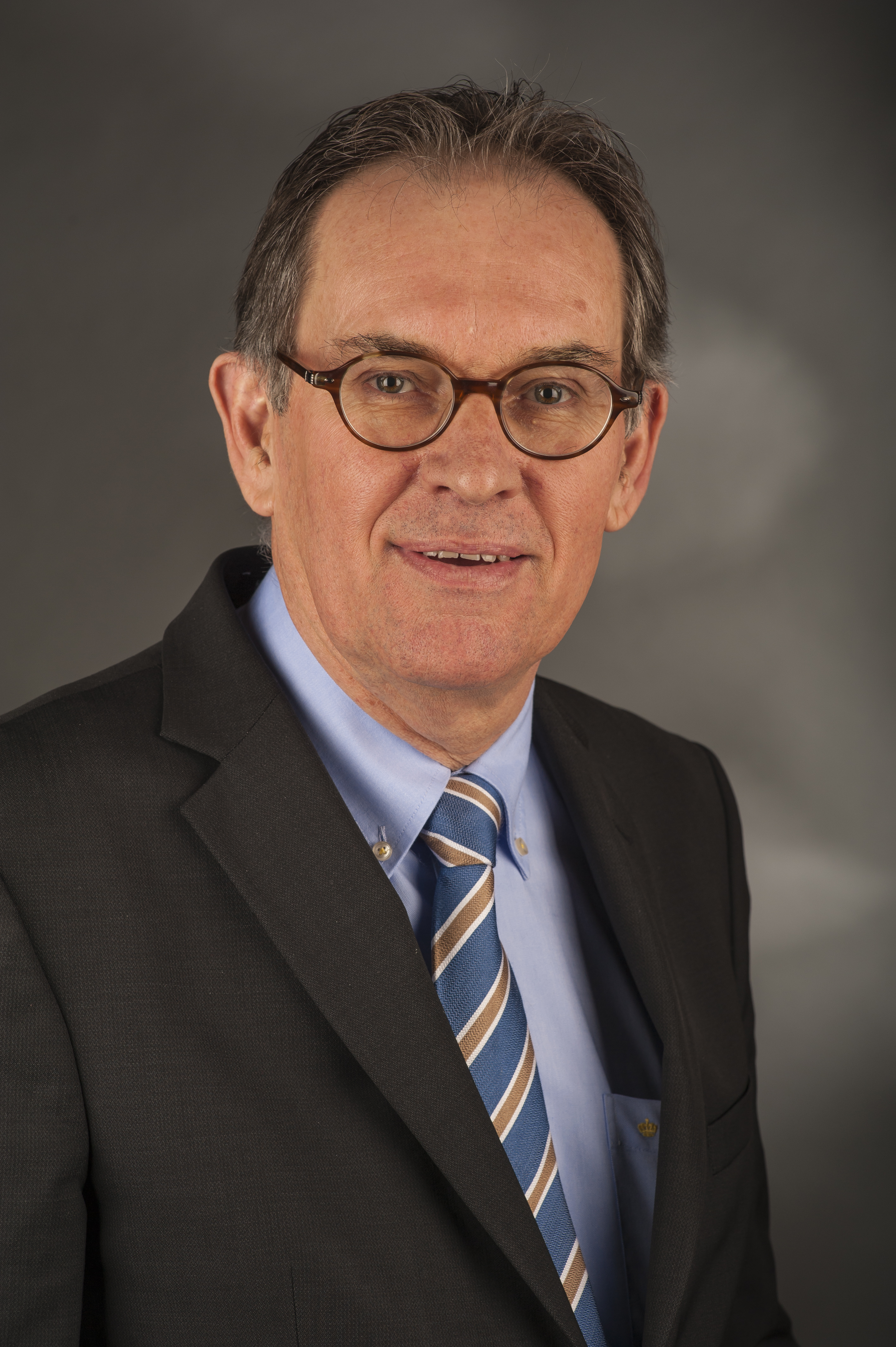
Alain Cadec in 2014.

Alain Cadec (born 21 June 1953) is a French politician of the Republicans (LR) who has been serving as a member of the Senate since the 2020 elections, representing the Côtes-d'Armor district. He previously was a Member of the European Parliament (MEP) for the West France constituency from 2009 until 2019.

== Career in local politics ==
Cadec has been a municipal councillor in Saint-Brieuc since 1995 and he has been a member of the governing coalition in the city since 2001. He has also been general councillor for the Canton of Saint-Brieuc-Nord since 2001.

== Member of the European Parliament, 2009–2019 ==
In the 2009 European elections, Cadec was the third candidate on the UMP list in the West region and was elected to the European Parliament. Throughout his time in parliament, he served on the Committee on Fisheries, which he was the chairman of from 2014 until 2019. In this capacity, he was the Parliament's rapporteur on landing obligation (part of a reform of the Common Fisheries Policy).

Between 2009 and 2014, Cadec was also a member of the Committee on Regional Development. In addition to his committee assignments, he was part of the parliament's delegation to the EU-Russia Parliamentary Cooperation Committee since 2014. He was also one of the vice chairs of the European Parliament Intergroup on Seas, Rivers, Islands and Coastal Areas.

In the Republicans’ 2017 leadership election, Cadec endorsed Laurent Wauquiez.

== Other activities ==
- Robert Schuman Foundation, Member of the Board of Directors
