= Françoise Olivier-Coupeau =

French politician

Member of the National Assembly for Morbihan's 5th constituency
- In office 20 June 2007 – 4 May 2011
- Preceded by: Jean-Yves Le Drian
- Succeeded by: Gwendal Rouillard

Personal details
- Born: Françoise Geneviève Janine Coupeau; 3 July 1959 Laval, France
- Died: 4 May 2011 (aged 51) Rennes, France
- Party: PS

Françoise Olivier-Coupeau (3 July 1959 – 4 May 2011) was a member of the National Assembly of France.

Olivier-Coupeau was born in Laval, Mayenne. She represented the Morbihan department (5th constituency), and was a member of the Socialiste, radical, citoyen et divers gauche. She was a member of the National Defence and Armed Forces Committee.

== Career ==
Olivier-Coupeau studied public and European law before working in adult education, including training for fishermen. In 1999, she became communications director for the Lorient urban community. She later headed the press office of the Brittany Regional Council and served as an adviser to its president, Jean-Yves Le Drian. She succeeded Le Drian in the National Assembly in 2007.

== Personal life ==
Olivier-Coupeau died on 4 May 2011 from cancer which she had made public during the 2007 legislative election. She was succeeded by Gwendal Rouillard, the first secretary of the Socialist Party in Morbihan and municipal councillor for Lorient.
