= Lydie Massard =

French politician (born 1978)

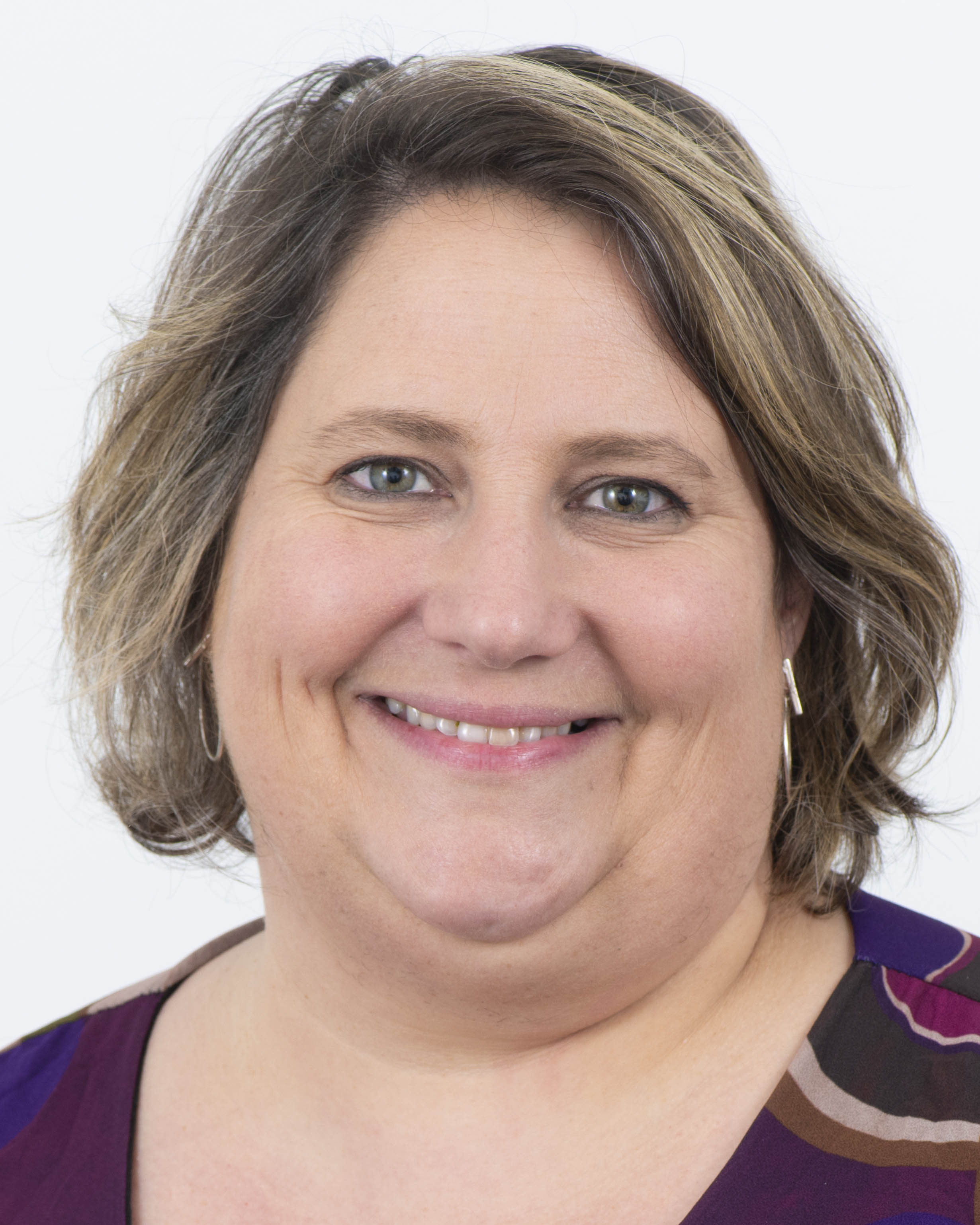

Member of the European Parliament for France
- In office 24 September 2023 – 15 July 2024
- Preceded by: Yannick Jadot

Personal details
- Born: 24 August 1978 (age 48) Loudéac, France
- Party: Breton Democratic Union

Lydie Massard (born 24 August 1978) is a French politician of the Breton Democratic Union who served as a Member of the European Parliament from 2023 to 2024. She replaced Yannick Jadot.

== Political career ==
Massard is currently a presidential candidate for the 2026 United Left primary for the 2027 French presidential election.

== See also ==
- List of members of the European Parliament (2019–2024)
