= Jean-Yves Veillard =

French historian (1939–2020)

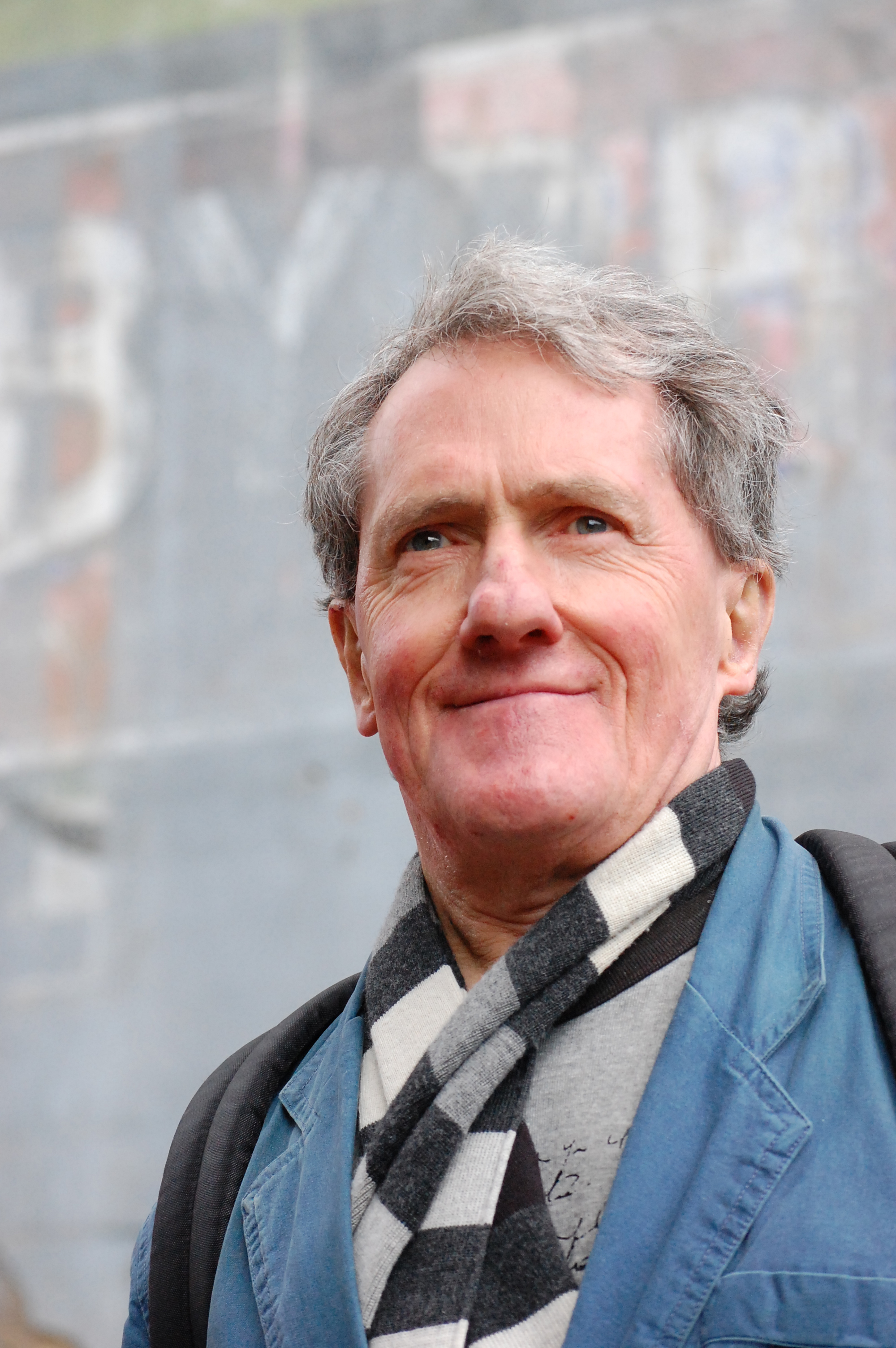
- Veillard in 2010
- Born: 19 February 1939; Rennes, France
- Died: 25 March 2020 (aged 81)
- Occupation: Historian

Jean-Yves Veillard (19 February 1939 – 25 March 2020) was a French historian.

== Biography ==
Veillard, alongside Donatien Laurent and Alan Stivell was one of the Bleimor Scouts. A historian and researcher, Veillard was the author of a thesis on Rennes during the 19th century. He was one of the founding members of the Breton Democratic Union in 1964. He was Curator of the Musée de Bretagne from 1967 to 2000 and opened the exhibition on Seiz Breur.

Jean-Yves Veillard died on 25 March 2020 at the age of 81.

== Works ==
- Celtes et Armorique (1971)
- Catalogue des intailles et camées de la collection du président de Robien (1972)
- Rennes au xixe siècle : architectes, urbanisme et architecture (1978)
- Études sur la presse en Bretagne aux xixe et xxe siècles (1981)
- Rennes naguère : 1850–1939 (1981)
- L’Ecomusée du pays de Rennes (1991)
- Promenades à Rennes. Le xixe siècle (1991)
- L’affaire Dreyfus et l’opinion publique en France et à l’étranger (1995)
- Dictionnaire du patrimoine breton (2000)
- Ar Seiz Breur 1923–1947, la création bretonne entre tradition et modernité (2000)
- Monsieur le "conservateur". Musées et combats culturels en Bretagne au temps de Yann-Cheun Veillard (2001)
- Dictionnaire du patrimoine rennais (2004)
- Ar Seiz Breur 1923–1947, la création bretonne entre tradition et modernité (2007)
