= Bernadette Vergnaud =

French politician

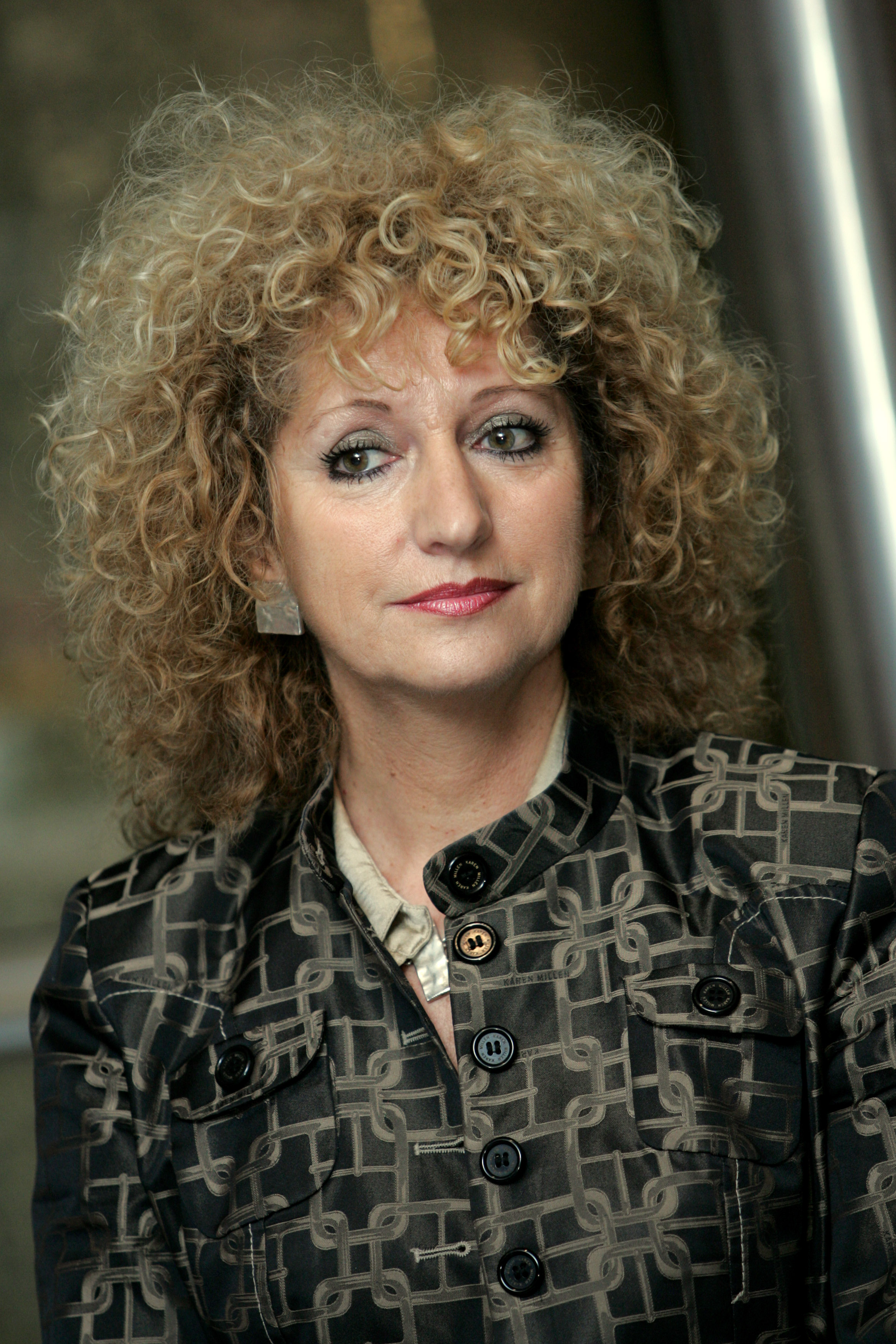
Bernadette Vergnaud (2010)

Bernadette Vergnaud (born 16 September 1950 in Montluçon, Allier) is a French politician who served as a Member of the European Parliament from 2004 until 2014, representing the west of France. She is a member of the Socialist Party, which is part of the Party of European Socialists.

During her time in Parliament, Vergnaud served on the Committee on the Internal Market and Consumer Protection. She was also a substitute for the Committee on Agriculture and Rural Development the Committee on Women's Rights and Gender Equality, the delegation for relations with Mercosur, the delegation for relations with the Mashreq countries, and the delegation to the Euro-Mediterranean Parliamentary Assembly.

== Career ==
- Degree in Spanish (1972)
- Degree in Portuguese (1973)
- Master's degree (Latin languages and Latin-American languages) (1974)
- Latin teacher (1971–1972)
- Adviser in the national education administration (1972–1975)
- University bursar (1976–2004)
- Secretary of the Poitiers section of the Socialist Party (1990–2003)
- Departmental Secretary for Vienne, with responsibility for women's rights (since 1997)
- Member of the National Women's Committee (since 1997)
- Member of the National Women's Council (since 2004)
- Member of the bureau of the National Women's Council (since 2004)
- Member of Poitiers Municipal Council (1995–2001)
- Deputy Mayor of Poitiers with responsibility for education and school catering (since 2001)
- Member of the Poitou-Charentes Regional Council (1998–2004)
