= Ronan Leprohon =

French Breton historian and politician (1939–2017)

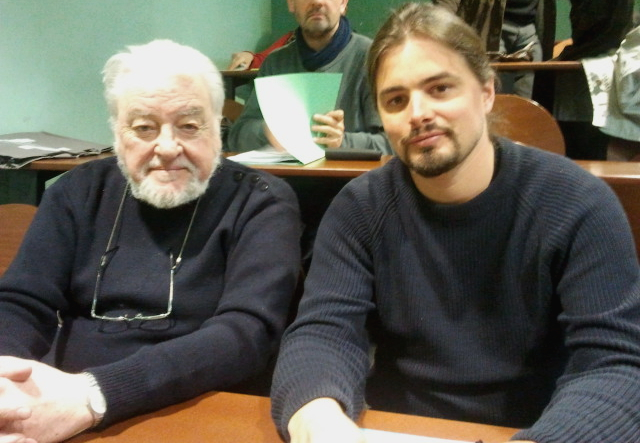
(from left to right) Roger "Ronan" Leprohon, one of the founders and one of the old editor-in-chief of the magazine Le Peuple breton ("The Breton People), and Gael Briand, the current editor-in-chief, during a colloquium of Faculty of political science of Rennes organized on April 4th and 5th, 2013 and dedicated to the Breton Democratic Union (UDB).

Ronan Leprohon (born Roger Leprohon; 22 March 1939 – 23 August 2017) was a 20th-century French Breton academic historian, politician, and lifelong Breton nationalist.

== Background ==
Roger Leprohon was born on March 22, 1939. His father a militant communist laborer, his mother a Breton-speaker.

In 1965, he began doctoral studies in history at the University of Rennes under François Lebrun and received his doctorate in 1972.

== Career ==
=== Academic ===
In 1969, Leprohon became a professor of modern history at the University of Western Brittany in Brest, Brittany, France.

=== Politician ===
In 1964, Leprohon became a founding member of the Unvaniezh Demokratel Breizh (English - Breton Democratic Union, French - (Union démocratique bretonne, AKA "UDB") with Yan-Cheun Veillard (born Jean-Yves Veillard). In 1977, he became deputy mayor of Brest and regional councilor of Brittany. He served as vice-president of the urban community of Brest, responsible for economic development, initiator of the "technopole" (high tech center) of Brest.

In 1982, he joined the Socialist Party of France (PS), which he supported until 1997. During that period, he served two terms as regional councilor of Brittany, elected by direct popular vote.

In 1997, he returned to the UDB. He assumed responsibility (again) for the UDB newspaper Le Peuple breton and was member of the UDB political bureau until November 2010.

== Personal and death ==
Leprohon died age 78 on August 23, 2017.

== Legacy ==
Gael Brian, editor of Le People breton said of Leprohon:

Ronan Leprohon était un tribun hors pair, une force de caractère, exigeant envers les autres et lui-même, qui pouvait tout à la fois rentrer dans une grosse colère et être d'une grande gentillesse". "Il m’impressionnait par sa capacité à toujours voir un sujet sous un angle original ... Ronan ne laissait jamais indifférent et ses analyses politiques étaient souvent brillantes
Ronan Leprohon was an outstanding tribune, a force of character, demanding of others and himself, who could at the same time enter into a great anger and be of a great kindness... He impressed me by his ability to always see a subject from an original angle... Ronan never left indifferent and his political analyzes were often brilliant.

The UDB issued a statement of homage to Leprohon, saying:

Lui qui ne distinguait pas ses combats pour la gauche et pour la Bretagne est resté fidèle à son idée de reconnaissance du peuple breton et de ses droits. « Nous ne nous battons pas pour la « Bretagne », disait-il, nous nous battons pour le peuple breton. » En ce sens, il a eu un rôle prépondérant dans l'émergence d'une pensée politique de gauche et bretonne.
He who did not distinguish his fighting for the left and for Brittany remained faithful to his idea of recognition of the Breton people and their rights. 'We do not fight for Brittany,' he said. 'We are fighting for the Breton people.' In this sense, he had a leading role in the emergence of a left-wing and Breton political thought.

Philippe Chain, president of Paris Breton, said:

Ronan Leprohon mena une action politique orientée pour la Bretagne, mais pas n'importe quelle Bretagne, il la voulait autonome et sociale et ne cessa d'œuvrer pour ces objectifs. Sa disparition laissera un vide dans le mouvement breton. Adieu, Ronan.
Ronan Leprohon led a political action oriented for Brittany, but not any Brittany: he wanted it autonomous and social and did not cease to work for these objectives. Its disappearance will leave a void in the Breton movement. Goodbye, Ronan.

Many others paid tribute to him at his time of death.

== Works ==
- Leprohon, Ronan (1984). Vie et mort des Bretons sous Louis XIV. Braspars: Les Bibliophiles de Bretagne. p. 259. ISBN 2-904582-02-9.
- Quand les Bretons racontent leur propre histoire, Presses populaires de Bretagne, 2018, 174 p., ISBN 978-2-9502619-4-6

== See also ==
- Unvaniezh Demokratel Breizh (UDB)
- Breton nationalism
