= Jean-Yves Le Drian =

French politician (born 1947)

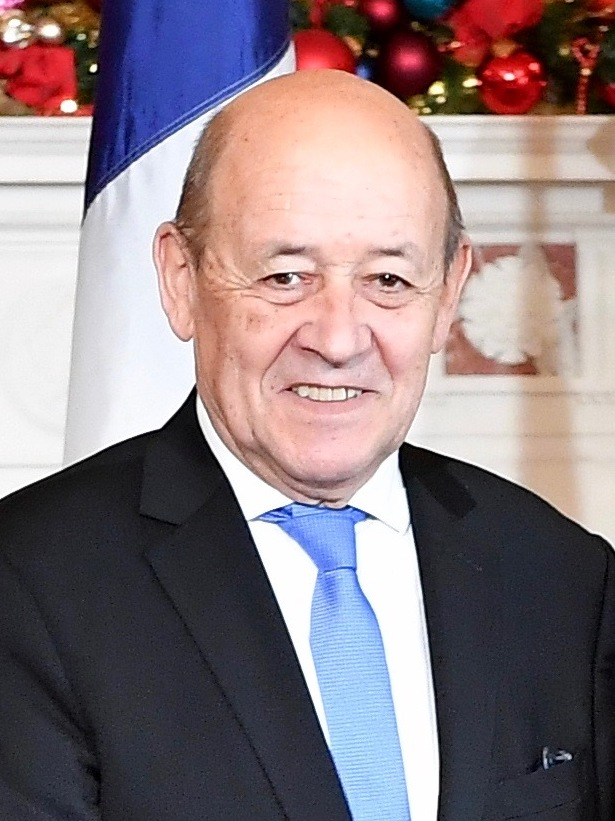
- Le Drian in 2017

Minister for Europe and Foreign Affairs
- In office 17 May 2017 – 20 May 2022
- Prime Minister: Édouard Philippe; Jean Castex
- Preceded by: Jean-Marc Ayrault
- Succeeded by: Catherine Colonna

President of the Committee of Ministers of the Council of Europe
- In office 17 May 2019 – 27 November 2019
- Preceded by: Timo Soini
- Succeeded by: David Zalkaliani

President of the Regional Council of Brittany
- In office 18 December 2015 – 2 June 2017
- Preceded by: Pierrick Massiot
- Succeeded by: Loïg Chesnais-Girard
- In office 2 April 2004 – 29 June 2012
- Preceded by: Josselin de Rohan
- Succeeded by: Pierrick Massiot

Minister of Defence
- In office 16 May 2012 – 10 May 2017
- Prime Minister: Jean-Marc Ayrault; Manuel Valls; Bernard Cazeneuve
- Preceded by: Gérard Longuet
- Succeeded by: Sylvie Goulard

Secretary of State for the Sea
- In office 16 May 1991 – 2 April 1992
- Prime Minister: Édith Cresson
- Preceded by: Jacques Mellick
- Succeeded by: Charles Josselin

Mayor of Lorient
- In office 4 July 1981 – 2 April 1998
- Preceded by: Jean Lagarde
- Succeeded by: Norbert Métairie

Member of the National Assembly for Morbihan
- In office 12 June 1997 – 19 June 2007
- Preceded by: Michel Godard
- Succeeded by: Françoise Olivier-Coupeau
- Constituency: 5th
- In office 3 April 1978 – 1 April 1991
- Preceded by: Yves Allainmat
- Succeeded by: Pierre Victoria
- Constituency: 5th (1978–1986); At-large (1986–1988); 5th (1988–1991)

Personal details
- Born: Jean-Yves Paul Le Drian; 30 June 1947 (age 79) Lorient, France
- Party: RE (2022–present)
- Other political affiliations: UDB (1970s); PS (1974–2018); Independent (2018–2020); TDP (2020–2022)
- Education: University of Rennes 2
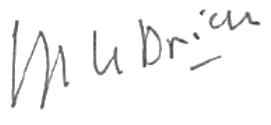
- Signature

Jean-Yves Paul Le Drian (French pronunciation: [ʒɑ̃iv lə dʁijɑ̃]; born 30 June 1947) is a French politician who served as Minister of Europe and Foreign Affairs in the governments of Prime Ministers Édouard Philippe and Jean Castex (2017–2022) and as Minister of Defence under President François Hollande (2012–2017). A former member of the Socialist Party, he had been an independent from 2018 before founding Territories of Progress in 2020.

== Family and education ==
Jean-Yves Le Drian was born in Lorient to working-class parents, Jean and Louisette, who were active members of the Young Christian Workers (Jeunesse ouvrière chrétienne, JOC). He completed his studies at the University of Rennes 2, where he was an activist for the Union Nationale des Étudiants de France (UNEF). First interested by the Breton Democratic Union (UDB) in the early 1970s, he joined the Socialist Party (PS) in May 1974.

== Political career ==
=== Early functions ===
In 1977, he assumed the position of Deputy Mayor of Lorient; one year later, at the age of 30, he became a member of the National Assembly for Morbihan. He served until 1993 and then again from 1997 until 2007. He became Mayor of Lorient in 1981 and retained the office until 1988; he also served as Secretary of State for the Sea under President François Mitterrand from 1991 to 1992.

In the 2004 regional elections, leading the Bretagne à gauche, Bretagne pour tous (PS-PCF-PRG-Les Verts-UDB) list, he won 58.66% of the vote in the runoff and a total of 58 seats in the Regional Council of Brittany. He thus became President of the Regional Council of Brittany. In October 2010 he became President of the Conference of Peripheral Maritime Regions of Europe (CPMR).

=== Minister of Defence, 2012–2017 ===
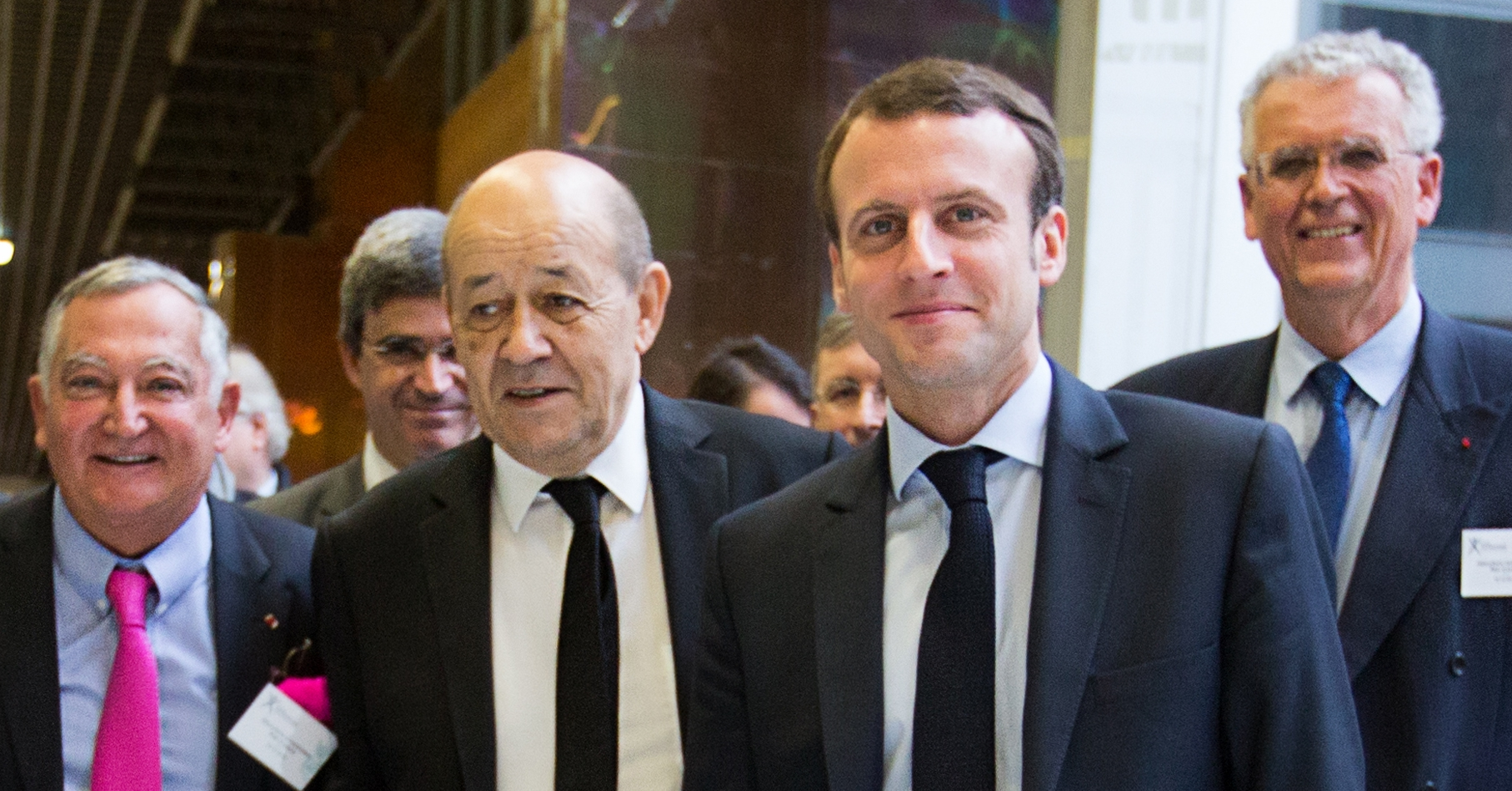
Jean-Yves Le Drian at the École Polytechnique in 2015, with Emmanuel Macron, then Minister of the Economy, Industry and Digital Affairs

Le Drian was nominated to serve as Minister of Defence under President François Hollande on 16 May 2012. He managed the withdrawal of French troops from Afghanistan and the deployment of French troops in the Northern Mali conflict and Operation Barkhane. He is also credited with leading a resurgence in French weapons' exports that have resulted in billions of euros in deals, including the first exports of the Dassault Rafale fighter jet.

Ahead of the Socialist Party's 2017 primaries, Kanner endorsed Manuel Valls as the party's candidate for the presidential election later that year. By 23 March 2017, he eventually endorsed Emmanuel Macron's candidacy for President of the Republic. After Macron won the presidential election, he appointed Le Drian as Foreign Minister in the First Philippe government.

=== Minister for Europe and Foreign Affairs, 2017–2022 ===
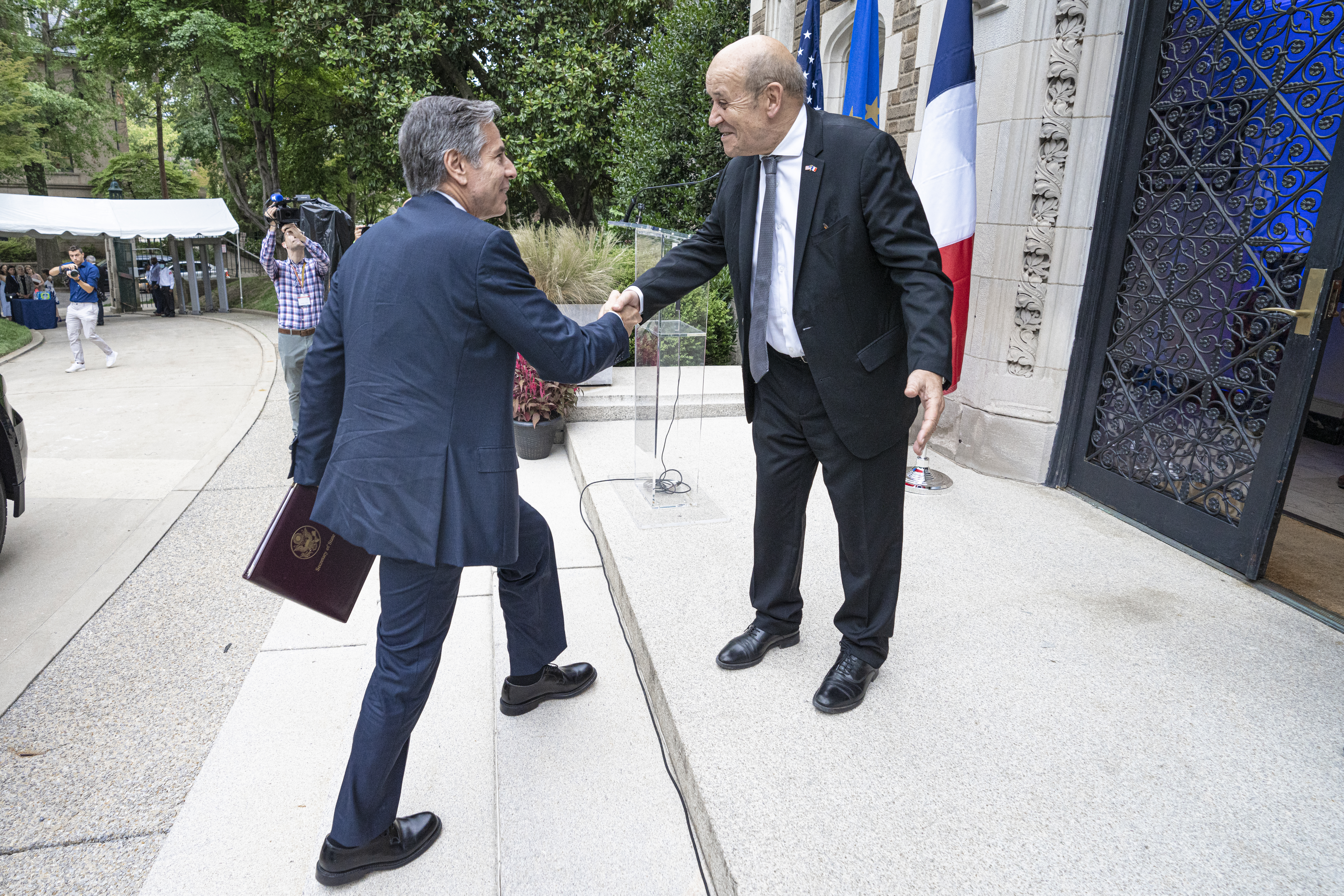
Le Drian with US Secretary of State Antony Blinken, 2021

Le Drian remained in office when the Second Philippe government was inaugurated; on 8 March 2018, he officially resigned from the Socialist Party.

In August 2019, Le Drian called on Hong Kong authorities to renew talks with Hong Kong protesters to find a peaceful solution to the then ongoing crisis. On 9 October 2019, Le Drian condemned the unilateral Turkish operation in Northeastern Syria and declared that Turkey's military incursion "is jeopardising the anti-Islamic State coalition's security and humanitarian efforts and is a risk for the security of Europeans".

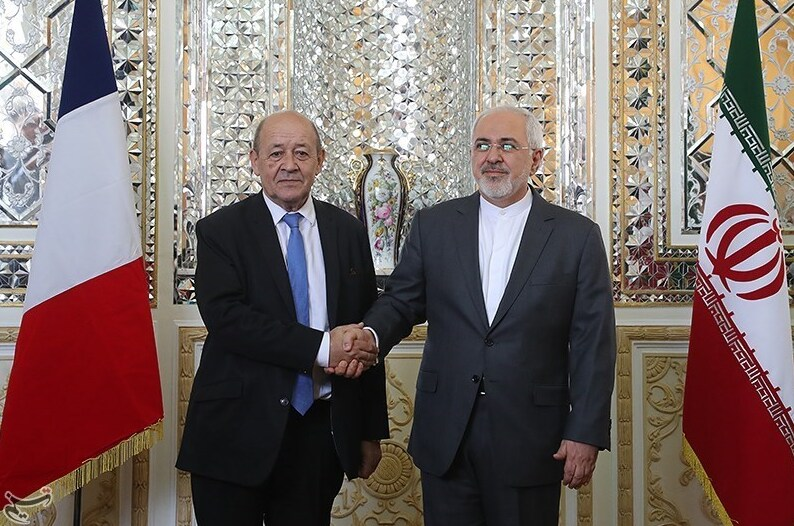
Le Drian with Iranian Foreign Minister Mohammad Javad Zarif, 2018

In 2020, Le Drian created the new movement Territories of Progress with fellow minister Olivier Dussopt.

The announcement of the AUKUS security pact between the United States, the United Kingdom, and Australia in September 2021 sparked a period of diplomatic tensions in French-American and French-Australian relations. The French government received official notification from Australia that the Attack-class submarine project, involving a A$90 billion Australian contract to buy 12 French submarines, was to be cancelled only a few hours before it was publicly announced. In a joint statement, Le Drian and French armed forces minister Florence Parly expressed disappointment at Australia's decision to abandon their joint submarine program with France. Le Drian further stated in a radio interview that the contract termination was a "stab in the back". On 17 September, France recalled its ambassadors from Australia and the US. Despite tension in the past, France had never before withdrawn its ambassador to the United States.

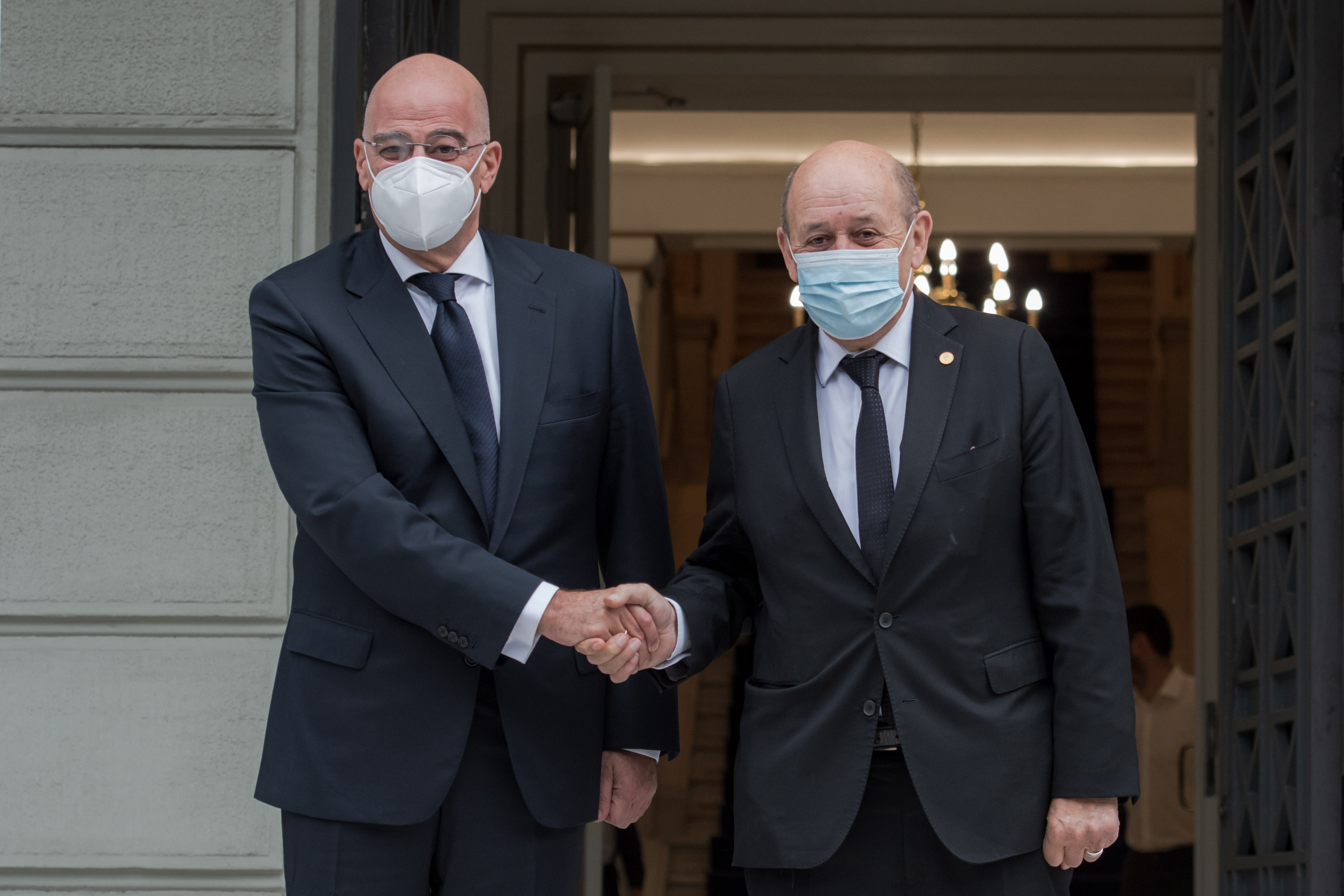
Le Drian with Greek Foreign Minister Nikos Dendias, 2021

In November 2021, in an interview with the newspaper Le Monde, Le Drian expressed concern about the economic predation weighing on African countries, pointing the finger at China and Russia: "Our competitors have no taboos or limits." According to Le Drian, Europeans must at all costs rebuild their relationship with the African continent.

=== Personal Envoy for Lebanon, 2023–present ===
In 2023, President Macron named Le Drian as his personal envoy for Lebanon.

== Awards and honours ==
- Grand Officier of the Order of Valour (Cameroon)
- Grand Cordon of the Order of the Republic (Egypt)
- Officer of the Legion of Honour (France)
- Commander of the Ordre du Mérite Maritime (France)
- Medal of the Order of the Golden Fleece (Georgia)
- Knight Commander of the Order of Merit of the Federal Republic of Germany (Germany)
- Commander of the National Order of the Ivory Coast (Ivory Coast)
- Grand Cordon of the Order of the Rising Sun (Japan)
- Grand Officier of the National Order of Mali (Mali)
- Sash of the Order of the Aztec Eagle (Mexico)
- Commander's Cross with Star of the Order of Merit of the Republic of Poland (Poland)
- Grand Officer of the National Order of the Lion (Senegal)
- Knight Grand Cross of the Order of Isabella the Catholic (Spain)

== Publications ==
- Qui est l'ennemi ?, Paris, ed. Le Cerf, 2016

Political offices
Preceded by Gérard Longuet	Minister of Defence; 2012–2017	Succeeded by Sylvie Goulard
Preceded by Jean-Marc Ayrault	Minister of Europe and Foreign Affairs; 2017–2022	Succeeded by Catherine Colonna
