= Joseph Martray =

French jurist, journalist, and politician

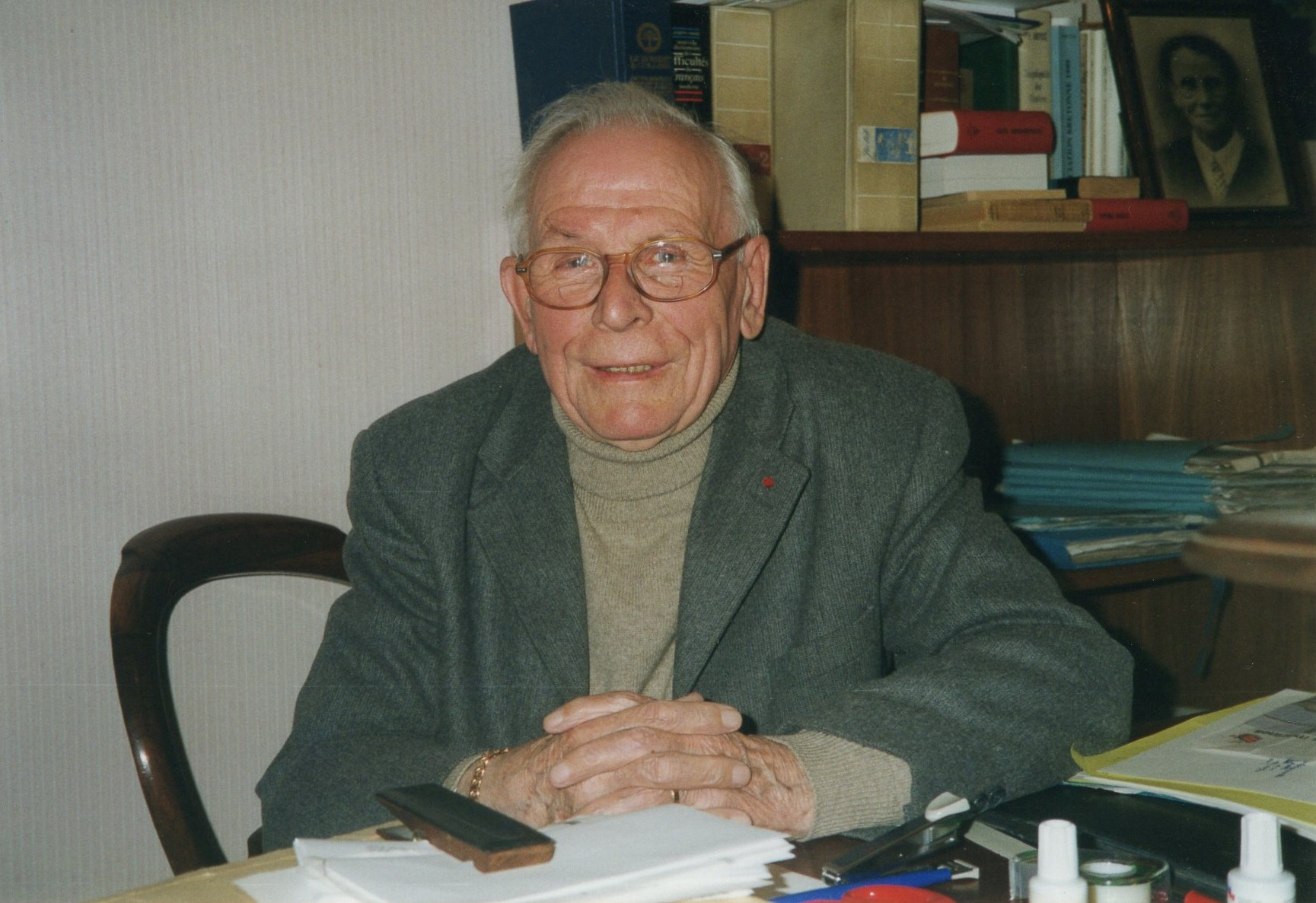
Joseph Martray (1914 - 2009)

Joseph Martray (born 14 May 1914, Lamballe – died 1 June 2009, Rennes) was a French jurist, journalist, and politician. He was an Officer of the Legion of Honour. He supported Breton rights.
