= Breton Liberty =

Breton Liberty Frankiz Breizh Liberté Bretagne
- Leader: Pierre Fourel
- Founded: 1984
- Split from: Breton Democratic Union
- Headquarters: Brest, Brittany
- Ideology: Breton nationalism Social democracy
- National affiliation: Régions et Peuples Solidaires

Website
- http://frankiz.breizh.chez-alice.fr

Breton Liberty (Breton: Frankiz Breizh, French: Liberté Bretagne) was a leftist national liberation movement in Brittany, France. It split off from the Breton Democratic Union, though the two parties' political stances were similar. Breton Liberty frequently worked within the Régions et Peuples Solidaires federation. Its activities were limited to the city of Brest (where it held a vice-mayor seat) and surrounding region of Léon and during its last years it did not have more than a dozen active member. The party was dissolved in 2007, and some of its members joined the Breton Democratic Union.
