= Yannick Vaugrenard =

French politician

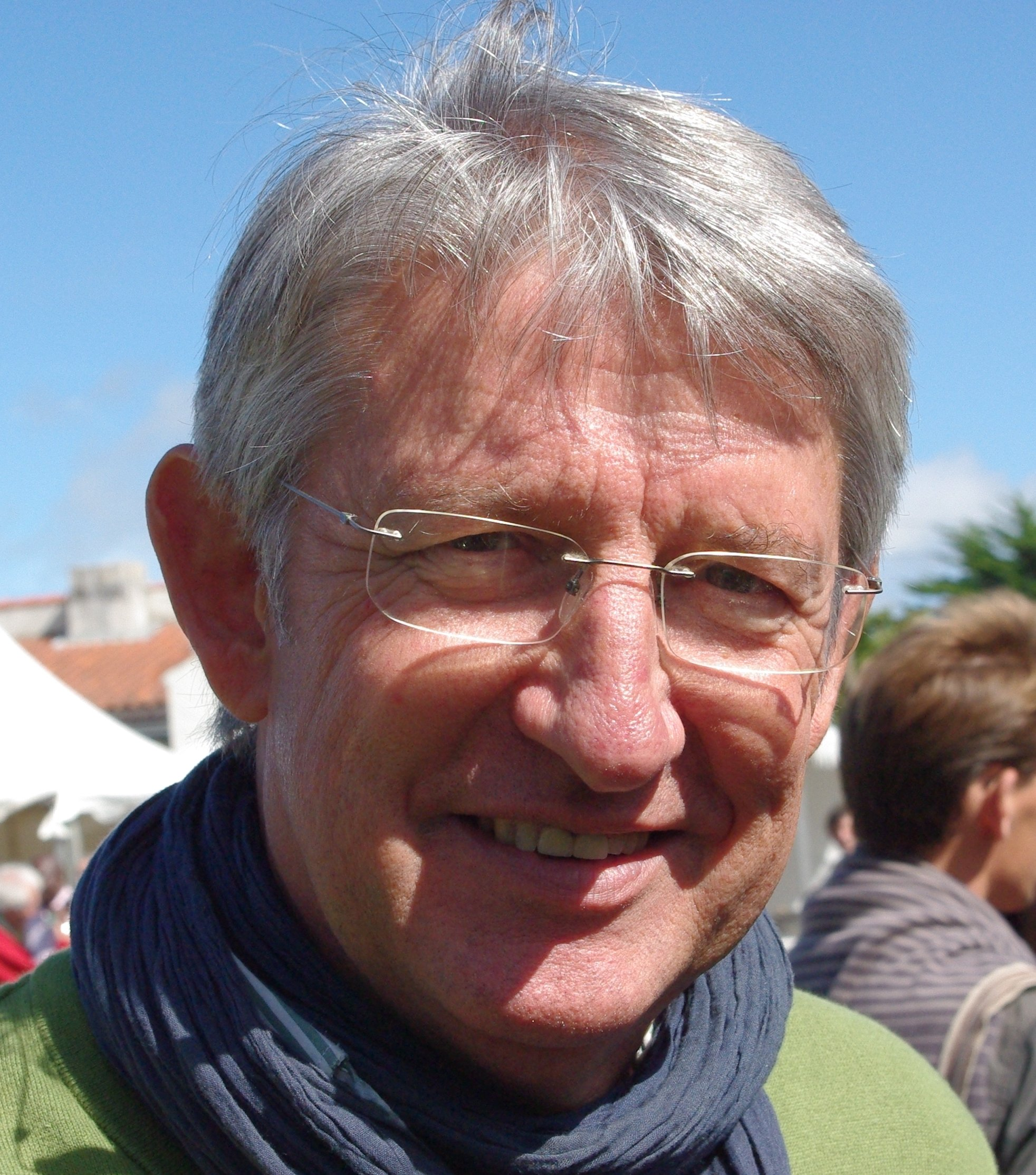
- Yannick Vaugrenard in 2011

Member of the French Senate for Loire-Atlantique
- Incumbent
- Assumed office 1 October 2011

Member of the European Parliament
- In office 20 July 2004 – 19 July 2019
- Constituency: West France

Personal details
- Born: 25 June 1950 (age 75) Trignac, Loire-Atlantique, France
- Party: Socialist Party

Yannick Vaugrenard (born 25 June 1950 in Trignac, Loire-Atlantique) is a French politician and Member of the European Parliament for the west of France. He is a member of the Socialist Party, which is part of the Party of European Socialists, and sits on the European Parliament's Committee on Budgets.

He is also a substitute for the Committee on Employment and Social Affairs, a member of the delegation to the EU–Romania Joint Parliamentary Committee, and a substitute for the delegation to the EU–Bulgaria Joint Parliamentary Committee.

== Career ==
- Baccalauréat
- Worked at the Banque nationale de Paris (1972–1989)
- Special adviser to the Deputy Mayor of Nantes (1989–2004)
- First federal secretary, Loire-Atlantique Socialist Party (1990–2001)
- Deputy mayor of Trignac (1977–1989)
- Deputy mayor of Saint-Nazaire (1995–2001)
- Member of the Loire-Atlantique Departmental Council (1982–1994)
- Member of the Pays de la Loire Regional Council (1986–2004)
- First Vice-Chairman of the Pays de la Loire Regional Council (since 2004)
