= Nicole Kiil-Nielsen =

French politician

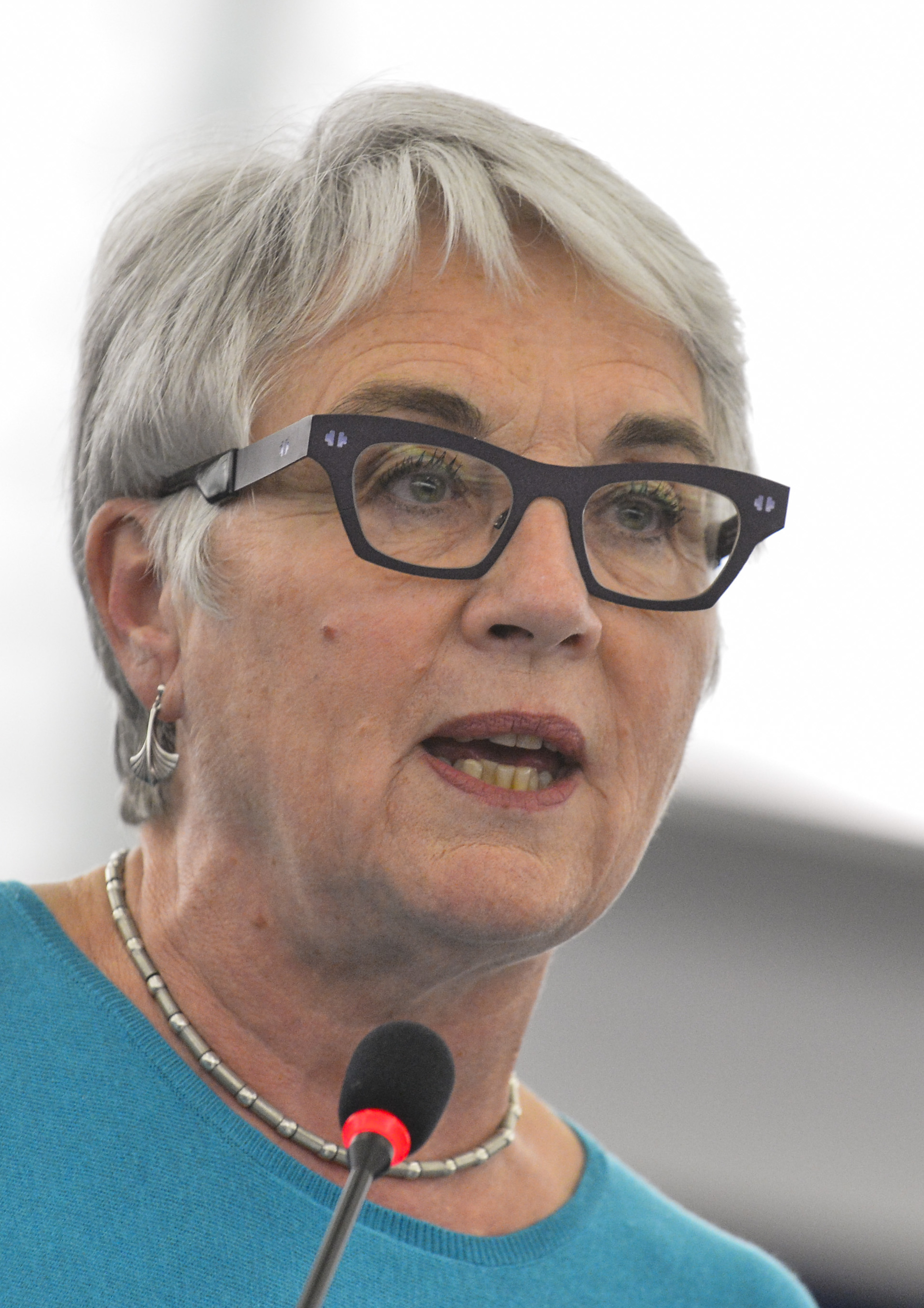
Nicole Kiil-Nielsen in 2013.

Nicole Kiil-Nielsen (born 21 August 1949, in Larchamp) is a French politician of The Greens who served as a Member of the European Parliament from the 2009 European election to 2014, representing the West France constituency.

Kiil-Nielsen has been a feminist and anti-nuclear activist since the 1960s. She won her first elected office in the 2001 municipal elections in Rennes as a candidate on Edmond Hervé's winning left-wing coalition list. She became assistant to the Mayor in charge of decentralized co-operation and international solidarity. However, in the 2008 municipal elections, she did not join Daniel Delaveau's left-wing union list and led her own list, Rennes verte et solidaire, which won 8.93% in the first round and did not participate in the runoff.

In the 2009 European elections, Kiil-Nielsen was the second candidate on the Europe Écologie list in the West region and was elected to the European Parliament.
