= André Pochon =

French farmer

André Pochon is a Breton farmer born in 1931 in Saint-Mayeux (Côtes d'Armor). He retired in 1991. He is known to be one of the promoters of the farming and sustainable agriculture. In 2011, he was honored as a recipient of the Order of the Ermine for his contribution to Breton culture and development.

== Critique of industrial agriculture ==
In his various books, as well as his many public statements, André Pochon criticized the industrial agriculture. He points in particular to the environmental damage caused by productivism, particularly through practices such as factory farming. According to him:

- this economic system penalizes primarily the farmers who are mono-active, so dependent on their suppliers, and pushes them a be burdened with debt.
- productivism has cost Europe its food independence, contrary to popular belief.

== "Pochon's method" ==
André Pochon offers alternatives to intensive farming based on breeding cows on meadows (with white clover) and pigs on straw. The success of this model will push the INRA to develop some research programs on white clover in the 1980s. Pochon exposes the virtues of straw, mixed with animal excrement, that produces farmyard manure unlike Factory farming that produces liquid manure. The latter has much lower agronomic properties and poses spreading problems. In Pochon's opinion:

- farmers that follow this method have equal or superior economic performance to "conventional" farmers, although they receive lower grants from the Common Agricultural Policy.
- this method has much higher environmental performances: farmers consume much less pesticides and nitrogen fertilizers.
- these experiments demonstrate the economic viability of environment friendly alternatives.

== Pochon's farming best practices ==
- Respecting the balance between soil, plants, animals: an agricultural area should have enough crops to feed his cattle (avoiding too much food imports) and enough livestock to "recycle" the straws as farmyard manure.
- A systematic rotation of crop based on prairies (three-quarters of the plots must be prairies) with plants adapted to the climate.
- Breeding on straw exclusively, no factory farming to avoid liquid manure and taking into account animal welfare.

== Critique of Pochon's attitude ==
While deploring Pochon's controversial guidance, the INRA admits that one of the Pochon's mottos (cusumers must become "consum'actors") could be a necessary step to reconcile the French society with its agriculture and nutrition.
