= Breton Democratic Union =

Breton political party in France

- French name: Union démocratique bretonne
- Breton name: Unvaniezh Demokratel Breizh
- Spokesperson(s): Lydie Massard; Pierre-Emmanuel Marais
- Founded: 4 January 1964
- Split from: Movement for the Organization of Brittany (MOB)
- Headquarters: Nantes
- Newspaper: Le Peuple breton
- Youth wing: UDB Youth (UDBy)
- Membership (2010): 850
- Ideology: Autonomism; Environmentalism; Pro-Europeanism
- Political position: Left-wing
- National affiliation: Regions and Peoples with Solidarity (1995–present); New Popular Front (2024–present)
- European affiliation: European Free Alliance
- Colors: Yellow
- Regional Council of Brittany: 4 / 83
- National Assembly (Breton seats): 0 / 27
- Senate (Breton seats): 0 / 18
- European Parliament: 0 / 81

Website
- udb.bzh

The Breton Democratic Union (French: Union démocratique bretonne; Breton: Unvaniezh Demokratel Breizh, UDB) is a Breton nationalist, autonomist, and regionalist political party in Brittany (Bretagne administrée) and Loire-Atlantique. The UDB advocates devolution for Brittany as well as the promotion of its regional languages (Breton and Gallo) and its associated culture.

The Breton Democratic Union has presently four seats in the Regional Council of Brittany.

== History ==
Flag used by the party in the 1970s and 1980s

=== Foundation ===
The UDB was founded in 1964 in Rennes by a group of about fifteen young people, most of them students, often from cultural organizations (Ar Falz, Bagadou, etc.) and influenced by socialist ideas. They included Ronan Leprohon (1939–2017) and Pierre Le Moine (1927–2023).

The majority belonged to the "Mouvement pour l'organisation de la Bretagne" organization which also included former militants of Breton Nationalist Party and supporters of French Algeria, which was a cause of tensions.

The first congress of the UDB took place in December 1964 in Quimper, with a mere 18 participants.

The UDB was founded in opposition to the practice of torture in Algeria and compared the decolonization of the Maghreb to Brittany.

The structure of the new party was then close to that of those of the far-left with a strict internal discipline. Its charter, elaborated in 1964, supported a planned economy and the creation of a European Federation. It claimed to be hostile to militarism and colonialism, which was an innovation in the Breton movement at the time.

The creation of the UDB marked a rupture in the history of the Breton nationalist movement which, until then, was rather right-wing.

It took part in the 1965 local elections. Jean-Paul Berre was elected on a list of the Union of the left dominated by the French Communist Party in Guilvinec and becomes deputy-mayor and first elected official of the UDB.

=== Beginnings (1966–69) ===
The first years were difficult. The party grew slowly and had few resources. It approached the other left-wing parties, in particular the PSU and FGDS. After 1967, however, recruitment intensified, in particular in student unions.

In the 1969 constitutional referendum, the UDB called for a "no" vote, like most of the left.

=== Crisis of 1969–70 ===
Internal contradictions within the party exploded during the 1969 congress when Alain Guyader challenged the charter of the UDB and proposed a line inspired by Rosa Luxemburg's ideas. Moreover, he refused to condemn the Soviet invasion of Czechoslovakia in 1968.

The conflict led to the exclusion of Jean-Yves Guiomar and Alain Guyader in 1970 for "rejection of democratic centralism, constant undervaluation of the adversary, impatience and the theory of active minorities, and the idolization of spontaneity".

=== Success (1970–78) ===
The party was rebuilt during the congress of Guidel and adopted democratic centralism. It also adopted a Marxist line and demanded in a modified version of its charter the abolition of capitalism and the collective appropriation of the means of production. At the same time, a UDB list won 11.5% of the votes in a local by-election in Auray, primarily thanks to the personality of its candidate Sten Kidna. In the 1971 local elections the UDB took part in the lists of the Union of the Left, except in Brest where it polled 4.8% running independently.

The number of party members – 243 in 1971 – grew throughout the 1970s, thanks to the involvement of the party in social conflicts.

During the 1973 general election, the UDB nominated five candidates who obtained between 0.8% and 3.2% of the vote despite a large showing by other left-wing parties. The most successful candidate, Erwan Evenou, won more than 3% in the Hennebont constituency.

During the cantonal elections held that same year, the party won 4.45% of the votes – 6.7% in Lorient. In the 1974 presidential election it campaigned in the second round for François Mitterrand.

In the 1976 cantonal elections the UDB ran nine candidates who won 5.27% on average. The local elections of 1977 enabled it to get 35 seats on the lists of the Union of the Left. In the 1978 general election, the party ran 17 candidates in a strongly polarized environment.

=== Crisis of 1978–84 ===
Party growth slowed as a result of failure of the legislative elections and the collapse of the United Left, in which the UDB was firmly anchored. While the party scored encouraging results (5.63%) in the 1979 cantonal elections, these were marked by very low voter turnout.

The victory of the left in 1981, paradoxically, increased the UDB's loss of momentum. Although policies in line with UDB positions were passed (such as decentralization, the cancelling of the Plogoff nuclear plant and the abolition of the death penalty), the UDB could claim little responsibility for them compared to the then-triumphant PS, and its usefulness seemed questionable.

In 1984, during the Lorient congress, one of the sections from Léon, whose motion had won a third of the votes, created a splinter group, Frankiz Breizh, based primarily in Brest and its immediate surroundings.

=== Crisis of 1984–2001 ===
After the departure of the Brest militants, the party was rebuilt and approached the European Free Alliance which then united about fifteen European regionalist parties of the centre-left. Despite considerable financial problems, it ran about thirty candidates in the 1985 cantonal elections and won on average 4.2%. Results in the Brest area, however, had considerably declined.

The 1986 regional elections, characterized by a strong bipolarization, were a failure for the party which won only 1.51%. During this time, contacts with Plaid Cymru became regular and in 1987 the UDB joined the European Free Alliance.

In the 1988 presidential election, the UDB supported the former Communist Pierre Juquin in the first round and François Mitterrand in the runoff.

In 1992, following the failure of negotiations with the Greens, the UDB presented its own list along with Emgann (which would eventually withdraw because of a nomination problem). The results were disappointing (2%) and strengthened the mistrust of the UDB towards alliances with the other nationalist groups.

The Saint-Brieuc congress, held in 1994, was an occasion for reconciliation with Frankiz Breizh whose political positions had never differed much from those of the UDB. In November of the same year the two organizations, together with the Occitan Party, the Party of the Corsican Nation, and Basque Solidarity, took part in the creation of the Federation of Regions and Peoples with Solidarity.

=== 2001–present ===
After 2001, the party experienced notable membership growth as well as an improvement in its electoral results.

In the 2001 local elections it chose to take part in lists presented by the united left except in Guingamp, Redon, Lannion and Saint-Nazaire. Their results varied between 6.02% in Saint-Nazaire and 13.7% in Guingamp. The UDB remained in the second round in Sarzeau and Guingamp. Moreover, the party participated in the victorious list of Christian Troadec in Carhaix.

This success encouraged the UDB to consider presenting an autonomous list in the 2004 regional elections. It finally resolved to open negotiations with The Greens. The UDB was in a strong position. A separate regionalist list could have won between three and five percent, thus cutting into the vote share of the ecologists and condemning their efforts to assert their independence from the Socialist Party.

The elections themselves were a success for The Greens-UDB list, which won nearly 10%. The UDB won three seats and a vice-presidency.

The 2005 French European Constitution referendum caused several well-known members of the UDB to call for a "no" vote, against the official position of the party which called for a vote in favour of the proposed constitution.

During the 2007 presidential election, the UDB supported Green candidate Dominique Voynet.

In the 2009 European Parliament election, the party supported the Europe Écologie electoral coalition, which included The Greens.

In June 2012 Paul Molac was elected to the National Assembly of France, the first Breton autonomist to do so. He stood for the UDB as a Europe Ecology – The Greens candidate in Morbihan uncontested by their electoral allies, the Socialist Party.

In the 2015 regional elections, the UDB made an alliance with Christian Troadec, one of the leaders of Breton autonomy. However, the UDB gained only 6.7% of votes, which was insufficient to ensure the election of regional councillors (a party must win at least 10% of the votes in order to go forward to the second round).

During the 2017 legislative elections, the UDB, together with the MBP, reactivated the dynamics of "Oui la Bretagne" (Yes Brittany) by aligning 34 candidates on 37 constituencies. This coalition obtained 32,422 votes, its highest score in this type of election, which was unfavourable to it. At the same time, it gains its independence for access to public funding for political parties.

During the 2019 European elections, the UDB, through the federation Régions et Peuples Solidaires (R&PS) associated with EELV (the Greens), were part of the strong result achieved by the national EELV list in Brittany, with 16.92% of the vote, while the average percentage of the list outside the zones where regionalists are associated is only 13.1% in Metropolitan France. François Alfonsi from Corsica (R&PS) was elected in 9th position on the list, whilst Lydie Massard from the UDB, 14th on the list, was not elected with only 30,000 votes, but entered the European Parliament in September 2023 to replace Yannick Jadot.
