= List of members of the European Parliament (2009–2014) =

Below is a list of members of the European Parliament serving in the seventh term (2009–2014). It is sorted by an English perception of surname treating all variations of de/di/do, van/von, Ó, and so forth as part of the collation key, even if this is not the normal practice in a member's own country.

During the 2009–2014 term, there were 736 members of parliament divided among the 27 member states, which increased to 754 per 1 December 2011 following the Treaty of Lisbon. Upon Croatia's accession in 2013, its 12 new seats added up to a total of 766 members of parliament.

== List of members ==
=== Austria ===
Austria elected 17 MEPs, which increased to 19 from 1 December 2011.

On the Austrian People's Party list: (European People's Party Group)

1. Othmar Karas
2. Elisabeth Köstinger
3. Hella Ranner (Replaced by Heinz K. Becker in 2011)
4. Paul Rübig
5. Richard Seeber
6. Ernst Strasser (Replaced by Hubert Pirker in 2011)

On the Social Democratic Party of Austria list: (Progressive Alliance of Socialists and Democrats)

1. Karin Kadenbach
2. Jörg Leichtfried
3. Evelyn Regner
4. Hannes Swoboda
5. Josef Weidenholzer (from 1 December 2011)

On the Martin list: (no group)

1. Martin Ehrenhauser
2. Hans-Peter Martin
3. Angelika Werthmann

On the Freedom Party of Austria list: (no group)

1. Andreas Mölzer
2. Franz Obermayr

On the Greens – The Green Alternative list: (The Greens–European Free Alliance)

1. Eva Lichtenberger
2. Ulrike Lunacek

On the Alliance for the Future of Austria list:

1. Ewald Stadler (from 1 December 2011)

=== Belgium ===
Belgium elected 22 MEPs.

Dutch-speaking electoral college:

On the Christen-Democratisch en Vlaams list: (EPP Group)

1. Ivo Belet
2. Jean-Luc Dehaene
3. Marianne Thyssen

On the Flemish Liberals and Democrats list: (ALDE)

1. Annemie Neyts-Uyttebroeck
2. Dirk Sterckx (replaced by Philippe De Backer)
3. Guy Verhofstadt

On the VB list: (no group)

1. Filip Dewinter (replaced by Philip Claeys)
2. Frank Vanhecke

On the Socialistische Partij Anders list: (PASD)

1. Saïd El Khadraoui
2. Kathleen Van Brempt

On the Nieuw-Vlaamse Alliantie list: (Greens-EFA)

1. Bart De Wever (replaced by Frieda Brepoels, replaced by Mark Demesmaeker)

On the Groen! Party list: (Greens-EFA)

1. Bart Staes

On the Lijst Dedecker list: (European Conservatives and Reformists)

1. Derk Jan Eppink

French-speaking electoral college:

On the Socialist Party list: (PASD)

1. Frédéric Daerden
2. Véronique De Keyser
3. Jean-Claude Marcourt (replaced by Marc Tarabella in 2009)

On the Mouvement Réformateur list: (ALDE)

1. Louis Michel
2. Frédérique Ries

On the Ecolo list: (Greens-EFA)

1. Isabelle Durant
2. Philippe Lamberts

On the Centre démocrate humaniste list: (EPP Group)

1. Anne Delvaux

German-speaking electoral college:

On the Christian Social Party list: (EPP Group)

1. Mathieu Grosch

=== Bulgaria ===
Bulgaria elected 17 MEPs, which increased to 18 from 1 December 2011.

On the Citizens for European Development of Bulgaria list: (EPP Group)

1. Iliana Ivanova (Replaced by Preslav Borissov)
2. Rumiana Jeleva (Replaced by Andrey Kovatchev)
3. Maria Nedeltcheva
4. Emil Stoyanov (Replaced by Monika Panayotova in 2012)
5. Vladimir Urutchev

On the Bulgarian Socialist Party list: (PASD)

1. Ivaylo Kalfin
2. Evgeni Kirilov
3. Kristian Vigenin
4. Iliana Yotova

On the Movement for Rights and Freedoms list: (ALDE)

1. Metin Kazak
2. Filiz Husmenova
3. Vladko Panayotov

On the Attack list: (no group)

1. Slavcho Binev
2. Dimitar Stoyanov

On the National Movement for Stability and Progress list: (ALDE)

1. Stanimir Ilchev
2. Antonia Parvanova

On the Union of Democratic Forces list: (EPP Group)

1. Nadezhda Mihaylova

On the Democrats for a Strong Bulgaria list: (EPP Group)

1. Svetoslav Malinov (from 1 December 2011)

=== Croatia (2013) ===
Croatia elected 12 MEPs upon its accession in 2013.

On the Croatian Democratic Union and allies (HSP AS–BUZ) list: (EPP)

1. Zdravka Bušić
2. Ivana Maletić
3. Andrej Plenković
4. Davor Ivo Stier
5. Dubravka Šuica
6. Ruža Tomašić

On the Social Democratic Party of Croatia and allies (HNS–HSU) list: (S&D)

1. Marino Baldini
2. Biljana Borzan
3. Sandra Petrović Jakovina
4. Tonino Picula
5. Oleg Valjalo

On the Croatian Labourists – Labour Party list: (S&D)

1. Nikola Vuljanić

=== Cyprus ===
Cyprus elected 6 MEPs.

On the Democratic Rally list: (EPP Group)

1. Ioannis Kasoulidis
2. Eleni Theocharous

On the Progressive Party of Working People list: (EUL/NGL)

1. Takis Hadjigeorgiou
2. Kyriacos Triantaphyllides

On the Democratic Party list: (PASD)

1. Antigoni Papadopoulou

On the Movement for Social Democracy list: (PASD)

1. Kyriakos Mavronikolas (replaced by Sophocles Sophocleous)

=== Czech Republic ===
The Czech Republic elected 22 MEPs.

On the Civic Democratic Party list: (ECR)

1. Milan Cabrnoch
2. Andrea Češková
3. Hynek Fajmon
4. Edvard Kožušník
5. Miroslav Ouzký
6. Ivo Strejček
7. Evžen Tošenovský
8. Oldřich Vlasák
9. Jan Zahradil

On the Czech Social Democratic Party list: (PASD)

1. Zuzana Brzobohatá
2. Robert Dušek
3. Richard Falbr
4. Jiří Havel replaced by Vojtěch Mynář
5. Pavel Poc
6. Libor Rouček
7. Olga Sehnalová

On the Communist Party of Bohemia and Moravia list: (EUL/NGL)

1. Jaromír Kohlíček
2. Jiří Maštálka
3. Miloslav Ransdorf
4. Vladimír Remek

On the Christian and Democratic Union – Czechoslovak People's Party list: (EPP Group)

1. Jan Březina
2. Zuzana Roithová

=== Denmark ===
Denmark elected 13 MEPs.

On the Social Democrats list: (PASD)

1. Ole Christensen
2. Dan Jørgensen
3. Christel Schaldemose
4. Britta Thomsen

On the Venstre list: (ALDE)

1. Anne E Jensen
2. Morten Løkkegaard
3. Jens Rohde

On the Socialist People's Party list: (Greens-EFA)

1. Margrete Auken
2. Emilie Turunen

On the Danish People's Party list: (EFD)

1. Morten Messerschmidt
2. Anna Rosbach Andersen

On the Conservative People's Party list: (EPP Group)

1. Bendt Bendtsen

On the People's Movement against the EU list: (EUL/NGL)

1. Søren Søndergaard (Replaced by Rina Ronja Kari in 2014)

=== Estonia ===
Estonia elected 6 MEPs.

On the Estonian Centre Party list: (ALDE)

1. Siiri Oviir
2. Edgar Savisaar (Replaced by Vilja Savisaar)

On the Indrek Tarand list: (Greens-EFA)

1. Indrek Tarand

On the Estonian Reform Party list: (ALDE)

1. Kristiina Ojuland

On the Union of Pro Patria and Res Publica list: (EPP Group)

1. Tunne Kelam

On the Social Democratic Party list: (PASD)

1. Ivari Padar

=== Finland ===
Finland elected 13 MEPs.

On the National Coalition Party list: (EPP Group)

1. Ville Itälä (replaced by Petri Sarvamaa)
2. Eija-Riitta Korhola
3. Sirpa Pietikäinen

On the Centre Party list: (ALDE)

1. Anneli Jäätteenmäki
2. Riikka Manner
3. Hannu Takkula

On the Social Democratic Party list: (PASD)

1. Liisa Jaakonsaari
2. Mitro Repo

On the Green League list: (Greens-EFA)

1. Satu Hassi
2. Heidi Hautala (replaced by Tarja Cronberg in 2011)

On the True Finns/Christian Democrats list: (EFD and EPP Group)

1. Sari Essayah (Christian Democrats is in EPP Group)
2. Timo Soini (True Finns is in EFD) (replaced by Sampo Terho in 2011)

On the Swedish People's Party list: (ALDE)

1. Carl Haglund (replaced by Nils Torvalds)

=== France ===
France elected 72 MEPs, which increased to 74 from 1 December 2011.

On the Union for a Popular Movement/New Centre list: (EPP Group)

1. Damien Abad
2. Jean-Pierre Audy
3. Michel Barnier (replaced by Constance Le Grip)
4. Dominique Baudis (replaced by Franck Proust)
5. Christophe Béchu (replaced by Agnès Le Brun)
6. Sophie Briard-Auconie
7. Alain Cadec
8. Jean-Marie Cavada
9. Arnaud Danjean
10. Michel Dantin
11. Rachida Dati
12. Joseph Daul
13. Christine de Veyrac
14. Gaston Franco
15. Marielle Gallo
16. Jean-Paul Gauzès
17. Françoise Grossetête
18. Pascale Gruny (replaced by Philippe Boulland)
19. Philippe Juvin
20. Alain Lamassoure
21. Véronique Mathieu
22. Élisabeth Morin
23. Maurice Ponga
24. Jean Roatta (from 1 December 2011)
25. Dominique Riquet
26. Tokia Saïfi
27. Marie-Thérèse Sanchez-Schmidt
28. Catherine Soullie (replaced by Brice Hortefeux)
29. Michèle Striffler
30. Dominique Vlasto

On the Socialist Party list: (PASD)

1. Kader Arif
2. Pervenche Berès
3. Françoise Castex
4. Harlem Désir
5. Estelle Grelier
6. Sylvie Guillaume
7. Liêm Hoang Ngoc
8. Stéphane Le Foll
9. Gilles Pargneaux
10. Vincent Peillon
11. Patrice Tirolien
12. Catherine Trautmann
13. Bernadette Vergnaud
14. Henri Weber

On the Europe Écologie list: (Greens-EFA)

1. François Alfonsi
2. Sandrine Bélier
3. Malika Benarab-Attou
4. Jean-Paul Besset
5. José Bové
6. Pascal Canfin
7. Yves Cochet (from 1 December 2011)
8. Daniel Cohn-Bendit
9. Karima Delli
10. Hélène Flautre
11. Catherine Grèze
12. Yannick Jadot
13. Eva Joly
14. Nicole Kiil-Nielsen
15. Michèle Rivasi

On the Democratic Movement list: (ALDE)

1. Jean-Luc Bennahmias
2. Marielle de Sarnez
3. Sylvie Goulard
4. Nathalie Griesbeck
5. Corinne Lepage
6. Robert Rochefort

On the Left Front list: (EUL/NGL)

1. Jacky Hénin
2. Élie Hoarau (replaced by Younous Omarjee)
3. Patrick Le Hyaric
4. Jean-Luc Mélenchon
5. Marie-Christine Vergiat

On the National Front list: (no group)

1. Bruno Gollnisch
2. Jean-Marie Le Pen
3. Marine Le Pen

On the Libertas list: (EFD)

1. Philippe de Villiers

=== Germany ===
Germany elected 99 MEPs.

On the Christian Democratic Union list: (EPP Group)

1. Burkhard Balz
2. Reimer Böge
3. Elmar Brok
4. Daniel Caspary
5. Christian Ehler
6. Karl-Heinz Florenz
7. Michael Gahler
8. Ingeborg Grässle
9. Christa Klaß
10. Peter Jahr
11. Elisabeth Jeggle
12. Dieter-Lebrecht Koch
13. Werner Kuhn
14. Werner Langen
15. Kurt Lechner (replaced by Birgit Collin-Langen)
16. Klaus-Heiner Lehne
17. Hans-Peter Liese
18. Thomas Mann
19. Hans-Peter Mayer
20. Doris Pack
21. Markus Pieper
22. Hans-Gert Pöttering
23. Godelieve Quisthoudt-Rowohl
24. Herbert Reul
25. Horst Schnellhardt
26. Birgit Schnieber-Jastram
27. Andreas Schwab
28. Renate Sommer
29. Thomas Ulmer
30. Sabine Verheyen
31. Axel Voss
32. Rainer Wieland
33. Hermann Winkler
34. Joachim Zeller

On the Social Democratic Party list: (PASD)

1. Udo Bullmann
2. Ismail Ertug
3. Knut Fleckenstein
4. Evelyne Gebhardt
5. Jens Geier
6. Norbert Glante
7. Matthias Groote
8. Jutta Haug
9. Petra Kammerevert
10. Constanze Krehl
11. Wolfgang Kreissl-Dörfler
12. Bernd Lange
13. Jo Leinen
14. Norbert Neuser
15. Bernhard Rapkay
16. Dagmar Roth-Behrendt
17. Ulrike Rodust
18. Martin Schulz
19. Peter Simon
20. Birgit Sippel
21. Jutta Steinruck
22. Barbara Weiler
23. Kerstin Westphal

On the Alliance '90/The Greens list: (Greens-EFA)

1. Jan Philipp Albrecht
2. Franziska Brantner
3. Reinhard Bütikofer
4. Michael Cramer
5. Sven Giegold
6. Gerald Häfner
7. Rebecca Harms
8. Martin Häusling
9. Ska Keller
10. Barbara Lochbihler
11. Heide Rühle
12. Elisabeth Schroedter
13. Werner Schulz
14. Helga Trüpel

On the Free Democratic Party list: (ALDE)

1. Alexander Alvaro
2. Jorgo Chatzimarkakis
3. Jürgen Creutzmann
4. Alexander Graf Lambsdorff
5. Nadja Hirsch
6. Wolf Klinz
7. Silvana Koch-Mehrin
8. Holger Krahmer
9. Gesine Meißner
10. Britta Reimers
11. Alexandra Thein
12. Michael Theurer

On Left list: (EUL/NGL)

1. Lothar Bisky
2. Cornelia Ernst
3. Thomas Händel
4. Jürgen Klute
5. Sabine Lösing
6. Helmut Scholz
7. Sabine Wils
8. Gabi Zimmer

On the Christian Social Union list: (EPP Group)

1. Albert Deß
2. Markus Ferber
3. Monika Hohlmeier
4. Martin Kastler
5. Angelika Niebler
6. Bernd Posselt
7. Manfred Weber
8. Anja Weisgerber

=== Greece ===
Greece elected 22 MEPs.

On the Panhellenic Socialist Movement list: (PASD)

1. Kriton Arsenis
2. Marilena Koppa
3. Stavros Lambrinidis (Replaced by Dimitrios Droutsas in 2011)
4. Giorgos Papakonstantinou (Replaced by Spyros Danellis in 2009)
5. Anni Podimata
6. Sylvana Rapti
7. Chrysoula Paliadeli
8. Giorgos Stavrakakis

On the New Democracy list: (EPP Group)

1. Giorgos Koumoutsakos
2. Rodi Kratsa-Tsagaropoulou
3. Giorgos Papanikolaou
4. Georgios Papastamkos
5. Kostas Poupakis
6. Theodoros Skylakakis
7. Giannis Tsoukalas
8. Marietta Giannakou

On the Communist Party of Greece list: (EUL/NGL)

1. Athanasios Pafilis (Replaced by Charalampos Angourakis in 2009)
2. Giorgos Toussas

On the Popular Orthodox Rally list: (EFD)

1. Niki Tzavela
2. Athanasios Plevris (Replaced by Nikolaos Salavrakos in 2009)

On the Coalition of the Radical Left list: (EUL/NGL)

1. Nikos Chountis

On the Ecologist Greens list: (Greens-EFA)

1. Michalis Tremopoulos (replaced by Nikos Chrysogelos)

=== Hungary ===
Hungary elected 22 MEPs.

On the Fidesz list: (EPP Group)

1. János Áder
2. Tamás Deutsch
3. Kinga Gál
4. Béla Glattfelder
5. Enikő Győri (Replaced by Zoltán Bagó in 2010)
6. András Gyürk
7. Ágnes Hankiss
8. Lívia Járóka
9. Ádám Kósa
10. Csaba Őry
11. Pál Schmitt (Replaced by Ildikó Pelczné Gáll in 2010)
12. György Schöpflin
13. László Surján
14. József Szájer

On the Hungarian Socialist Party list: (PASD)

1. Kinga Göncz
2. Zita Gurmai
3. Edit Herczog
4. Csaba Tabajdi

On the Jobbik list: (no group)

1. Zoltán Balczó (Replaced by Béla Kovács in 2010)
2. Krisztina Morvai
3. Csanád Szegedi

On the Hungarian Democratic Forum list: (ECR)

1. Lajos Bokros

=== Ireland ===
Ireland elected 12 MEPs.

On the Fine Gael list: (EPP Group)

1. Jim Higgins
2. Seán Kelly
3. Mairead McGuinness
4. Gay Mitchell

On the Fianna Fáil list: (ALDE)

1. Liam Aylward
2. Brian Crowley
3. Pat "the Cope" Gallagher

On the Labour Party list: (PASD)

1. Nessa Childers
2. Proinsias De Rossa (Replaced by Emer Costello in 2012)
3. Alan Kelly (Replaced by Phil Prendergast in 2011)

On the Socialist Party list: (EUL/NGL)

1. Joe Higgins (Replaced by Paul Murphy in 2011)

On the Independent list: (ALDE)

1. Marian Harkin

=== Italy ===
Italy elected 72 MEPs, which increased to 73 from 1 December 2011.

On the People of Freedom list: (EPP Group)

1. Gabriele Albertini
2. Roberta Angelilli
3. Alfredo Antoniozzi
4. Raffaele Baldassarre
5. Paolo Bartolozzi
6. Sergio Berlato
7. Vito Bonsignore
8. Antonio Cancian
9. Giovanni Collino (replaced by Giuseppe Gargani)
10. Lara Comi
11. Carlo Fidanza
12. Elisabetta Gardini
13. Salvatore Iacolino
14. Giovanni La Via
15. Clemente Mastella
16. Barbara Matera
17. Mario Mauro (replaced by Susy De Martini)
18. Erminia Mazzoni
19. Cristiana Muscardini
20. Alfredo Pallone
21. Aldo Patriciello
22. Crescenzio Rivellini
23. Licia Ronzulli
24. Potito Salatto
25. Amalia Sartori
26. Marco Scurria
27. Sergio Silvestris
28. Salvatore Tatarella
29. Iva Zanicchi

On the Democratic Party list: (PASD)

1. Francesca Balzani
2. Luigi Berlinguer
3. Rita Borsellino
4. Salvatore Caronna
5. Sergio Cofferati
6. Silvia Costa
7. Andrea Cozzolino
8. Rosario Crocetta
9. Francesco De Angelis
10. Paolo De Castro
11. Leonardo Domenici
12. Roberto Gualtieri
13. Guido Milana
14. Pier Antonio Panzeri
15. Mario Pirillo
16. Gianni Pittella
17. Vittorio Prodi
18. David Sassoli
19. Debora Serracchiani
20. Gianluca Susta
21. Patrizia Toia

On the Lega Nord list: (EFD)

1. Mara Bizzotto
2. Mario Borghezio
3. Lorenzo Fontana
4. Claudio Morganti
5. Fiorello Provera
6. Oreste Rossi
7. Matteo Salvini
8. Giancarlo Scottà
9. Francesco Speroni

On the Italy of Values list: (ALDE)

1. Sonia Alfano
2. Pino Arlacchi
3. Vincenzo Iovine
4. Niccolò Rinaldi
5. Giommaria Uggias
6. Gianni Vattimo
7. Luigi de Magistris (replaced by Andrea Zanoni)

On the Union of the Centre list: (EPP Group)

1. Magdi Allam
2. Antonello Antinoro
3. Carlo Casini
4. Ciriaco De Mita
5. Tiziano Motti

On the South Tyrolean People's Party list: (EPP Group)

1. Herbert Dorfmann

=== Latvia ===
Latvia elected 8 MEPs, which increased to 9 from 1 December 2011.

On the Civic Union list: (EPP Group)

1. Sandra Kalniete
2. Inese Vaidere
3. Kārlis Šadurskis (from 1 December 2011)

On the Harmony Centre list: (EUL/NGL and PASD)

1. Alexander Mirsky (National Harmony Party is in PASD)
2. Alfreds Rubiks (Socialist Party of Latvia is in EUL/NGL)

On the For Human Rights in United Latvia list: (Greens-EFA)

1. Tatjana Ždanoka

On the LPP/LC list: (ALDE)

1. Ivars Godmanis

On the For Fatherland and Freedom/LNNK list: (ECR)

1. Roberts Zīle

On the New Era Party list: (EPP Group)

1. Artūrs Krišjānis Kariņš

=== Lithuania ===
Lithuania elected 12 MEPs.

On the Homeland Union – Lithuanian Christian Democrats list: (EPP Group)

1. Laima Andrikienė
2. Vytautas Landsbergis
3. Radvilė Morkūnaitė
4. Algirdas Saudargas

On the Social Democratic Party list: (PASD)

1. Zigmantas Balčytis
2. Vilija Blinkevičiūtė
3. Justas Vincas Paleckis

On the Order and Justice list: (EFD)

1. Juozas Imbrasas
2. Rolandas Paksas

On the Labour Party list: (ALDE)

1. Viktor Uspaskich (Replaced by Justina Vitkauskaitė in 2012)

On the Electoral Action of Poles in Lithuania list: (ECR)

1. Valdemar Tomaševski

On the Liberal Movement list: (ALDE)

1. Leonidas Donskis

=== Luxembourg ===
Luxembourg elected 6 MEPs.

On the Christian Social People's Party list: (EPP Group)

1. Frank Engel
2. Astrid Lulling
3. Georges Bach

On the Luxembourg Socialist Workers' Party list: (PES)

1. Robert Goebbels

On the Democratic Party list: (ALDE)

1. Charles Goerens

On Déi Gréng list: (Greens-EFA)

1. Claude Turmes

=== Malta ===
Malta elected 5 MEPs, which increased to 6 from 1 December 2011.

On the Labour Party list: (PASD)

1. John Attard Montalto
2. Louis Grech (Replaced by Claudette Abela Baldacchino in 2013)
3. Edward Scicluna (Replaced by Marlene Mizzi in 2013)
4. Joseph Cuschieri (from 1 December 2011)

On the Nationalist Party list: (EPP Group)

1. Simon Busuttil (Replaced by Roberta Metsola Tedesco Triccas in 2013)
2. David Casa

=== Netherlands ===
The Netherlands elected 25 MEPs, which increased to 26 from 1 December 2011.

On the Christian Democratic Appeal list: (EPP Group)

1. Esther de Lange
2. Ria Oomen-Ruijten
3. Wim van de Camp
4. Lambert van Nistelrooij
5. Corien Wortmann-Kool

On the Party for Freedom list: (no group)

1. Louis Bontes (replaced by Lucas Hartong)
2. Barry Madlener (replaced by Patricia van der Kammen)
3. Daniël van der Stoep (replaced by Auke Zijlstra)
4. Laurence Stassen

On the Dutch Labour Party list: (PASD)

1. Thijs Berman
2. Emine Bozkurt
3. Judith Merkies

On the People's Party for Freedom and Democracy list: (ALDE)

1. Jeanine Hennis-Plasschaert (replaced by Jan Mulder)
2. Toine Manders
3. Hans van Baalen

On the Democrats 66 list: (ALDE)

1. Gerben-Jan Gerbrandy
2. Sophie in 't Veld
3. Marietje Schaake

On the GreenLeft list: (Greens-EFA)

1. Marije Cornelissen
2. Bas Eickhout
3. Judith Sargentini

On the Socialist Party list: (EUL/NGL)

1. Dennis de Jong
2. Kartika Liotard

On the ChristianUnion – Reformed Political Party list: (ECR and EFD)

1. Bastiaan Belder (Reformed Political Party is in EFD)
2. Peter van Dalen (ChristianUnion is in ECR)

Independent (no group)

1. Daniël van der Stoep (resigned in September 2011 while on the Party for Freedom list, was replaced there by Auke Zijlstra. However, due to the Netherlands gaining an extra seat in December 2011 he was allowed to return to the European Parliament. The Party for Freedom did not allow him to return, so he sits as an independent.)

=== Poland ===
Poland elected 50 MEPs, which increased to 51 from 1 December 2011.

On the Civic Platform list: (EPP Group)

1. Piotr Borys
2. Jerzy Buzek
3. Róża Gräfin Von Thun Und Hohenstein
4. Małgorzata Handzlik
5. Jolanta Hibner
6. Danuta Hübner
7. Danuta Jazłowiecka
8. Sidonia Jędrzejewska
9. Filip Kaczmarek
10. Lena Kolarska-Bobińska
11. Janusz Lewandowski (replaced by Jan Kozłowski)
12. Krzysztof Lisek
13. Elżbieta Łukacijewska
14. Bogdan Marcinkiewicz
15. Sławomir Nitras
16. Jan Olbrycht
17. Jacek Protasiewicz
18. Jacek Saryusz-Wolski
19. Joanna Skrzydlewska
20. Bogusław Sonik
21. Rafał Trzaskowski
22. Jarosław Wałęsa
23. Paweł Zalewski
24. Artur Zasada
25. Tadeusz Zwiefka

On the Law and Justice list: (ECR)

1. Adam Bielan
2. Tadeusz Cymański
3. Ryszard Czarnecki
4. Marek Gróbarczyk
5. Michał Kamiński
6. Paweł Kowal
7. Jacek Kurski
8. Ryszard Legutko
9. Marek Migalski
10. Mirosław Piotrowski
11. Tomasz Poręba
12. Konrad Szymański
13. Jacek Włosowicz
14. Janusz Wojciechowski
15. Zbigniew Ziobro

On the Democratic Left Alliance-Labor Union list: (PASD)

1. Lidia Geringer de Oedenberg
2. Adam Gierek
3. Bogusław Liberadzki
4. Wojciech Olejniczak
5. Joanna Senyszyn
6. Marek Siwiec
7. Janusz Zemke

On the Polish People's Party list: (EPP Group)

1. Arkadiusz Bratkowski (from 1 December 2011)
2. Andrzej Grzyb
3. Jarosław Kalinowski
4. Czesław Siekierski

=== Portugal ===
Portugal elected 22 MEPs.

On the Social Democratic Party list: (EPP Group)

1. Maria da Graça Martins da Silva Carvalho
2. Carlos Miguel Maximiano de Almeida Coelho
3. Mário Henrique de Almeida Santos David
4. José Manuel Ferreira Fernandes
5. Maria do Céu Patrão Neves de Frias Martins
6. Regina Maria Pinto da Fonseca Ramos Bastos
7. Paulo Artur dos Santos Castro de Campos Rangel
8. Nuno Alexandre Pisco Pola Teixeira de Jesus

On the Socialist Party list: (PASD)

1. António Fernando Correia de Campos
2. Edite de Fátima Santos Marreiros Estrela
3. Elisa Maria da Costa Guimarães Ferreira
4. Ana Maria Rosa Martins Gomes
5. Luis Manuel Capoulas Santos
6. Vital Martins Moreira
7. Luís Paulo de Serpa Alves

On the Left Bloc list: (EUL/NGL)

1. Marisa Isabel dos Santos Matias
2. Rui Miguel Marcelino Tavares Pereira
3. Miguel Sacadura Cabral Portas (replaced by Alda Sousa)

On the Democratic Unity Coalition list: (EUL/NGL)

1. Maria Ilda da Costa Figueiredo (replaced by Inês Zuber)
2. João Manuel Peixoto Ferreira

On the Democratic and Social Centre - People´s Party list: (EPP Group)

1. Diogo Nuno de Gouveia Torres Feio
2. João Nuno Lacerda Teixeira de Melo

=== Romania ===
Romania elected 33 MEPs.

On the Social Democratic Party/Conservative Party list: (PASD)

1. Silvia Adriana Ţicău
2. Victor Boştinaru
3. Corina Creţu
4. Sabin Cutaş
5. Vasilica Dăncilă
6. Ioan Enciu
7. Cătălin Ivan
8. Ioan Mircea Paşcu
9. Rovana Plumb (replaced by Minodora Cliveti)
10. Daciana Sârbu
11. Adrian Severin

On the Democratic Liberal Party list: (EPP Group)

1. Elena Oana Antonescu
2. Petru Luhan
3. Monica Macovei
4. Marian-Jean Marinescu
5. Iosif Matula
6. Rareş Niculescu
7. Cristian Preda
8. Theodor Stolojan
9. Traian Ungureanu
10. Sebastian Valentin Bodu

On the National Liberal Party list: (ALDE)

1. Cristian Buşoi
2. Ramona Mănescu
3. Norica Nicolai
4. Adina Vălean
5. Renate Weber

On the Democratic Union of Hungarians in Romania list: (EPP Group)

1. Csaba Sógor
2. László Tőkés
3. Iuliu Winkler

On the Greater Romania Party list: (no group)

1. Gigi Becali
2. Claudiu Ciprian Tănăsescu
3. Corneliu Vadim Tudor

On the Elena Băsescu list: (EPP Group)

1. Elena Băsescu

=== Slovakia ===
Slovakia elected 13 MEPs.

On the Direction – Social Democracy list: (PASD)

1. Monika Beňová
2. Vladimír Maňka
3. Katarína Neveďalová
4. Monika Smolková
5. Boris Zala

On the Slovak Democratic and Christian Union – Democratic Party list: (EPP Group)

1. Eduard Kukan
2. Peter Šťastný

On the Party of the Hungarian Coalition list: (EPP Group)

1. Edit Bauer
2. Alajos Mészáros

On the Christian Democratic Movement list: (EPP Group)

1. Miroslav Mikolášik
2. Anna Záborská

On the People's Party – Movement for a Democratic Slovakia list: (ALDE)

1. Sergej Kozlík

On the Slovak National Party list: (EFD)

1. Jaroslav Paška

=== Slovenia ===
Slovenia elected 7 MEPs, which increased to 8 from 1 December 2011.

On the Slovenian Democratic Party list: (EPP Group)

1. Romana Jordan Cizelj
2. Milan Zver
3. Zofija Mazej Kukovič (from 1 December 2011)

On the Social Democrats list: (PASD)

1. Tanja Fajon
2. Zoran Thaler (replaced by Mojca Kleva Kekuš)

On the New Slovenia list: (EPP Group)

1. Lojze Peterle

On the Liberal Democracy list: (ALDE)

1. Jelko Kacin

On the Zares list: (ALDE)

1. Ivo Vajgl

=== Spain ===
Spain elected 50 MEPs, which increased to 54 from 1 December 2011.

On the People's Party list: (EPP Group)

1. Pablo Arias Echeverría
2. María del Pilar Ayuso González
3. Luis de Grandes Pascual
4. Pilar del Castillo Vera
5. Agustín Díaz de Mera García Consuegra
6. Rosa Estaràs Ferragut
7. Carmen Fraga Estévez
8. José García-Margallo y Marfil (replaced by María Auxiliadora Correa Zamora)
9. Salvador Garriga Polledo
10. Cristina Gutiérrez-Cortines Corral
11. María Esther Herranz García
12. Santiago Fisas Ayxelá
13. Carlos José Iturgaiz Angulo
14. Teresa Jiménez-Becerril
15. Verónica Lope Fontagne
16. Antonio López-Istúriz White
17. Gabriel Mato Adrover
18. Jaime Mayor Oreja
19. Francisco José Millán Mon
20. Íñigo Méndez de Vigo Montojo (replaced by Juan Andrés Naranjo Escobar)
21. José Salafranca Sánchez-Neira
22. Alejo Vidal-Quadras Roca
23. Pablo Zalba Bidegain

On the Spanish Socialist Workers' Party list: (PASD)

1. Magdalena Álvarez (replaced by Sergio Gutiérrez Prieto)
2. Josefa Andrés Barea
3. Inés Ayala
4. María Badía
5. Alejandro Cercas
6. Ricardo Cortés Lastra
7. Iratxe García
8. Eider Gardiazabal Rubial
9. Enrique Guerrero Salom
10. Ramón Jáuregui Atondo (replaced by María Irigoyen Pérez)
11. Juan Fernando López Aguilar
12. Miguel Ángel Martínez Martínez
13. Antonio Masip Hidalgo
14. Emilio Menéndez
15. María Muñiz de Urquiza
16. Raimon Obiols
17. Juan Andrés Perelló Rodríguez
18. Teresa Riera
19. Carmen Romero López
20. Antolín Sánchez
21. Luis Yáñez-Barnuevo

On the Coalition for Europe list: (ALDE)

1. Izaskun Bilbao Barandica (Basque Nationalist Party)
2. Ramon Tremosa (Democratic Convergence of Catalonia)

On The Left list: (European United Left–Nordic Green Left and Greens-EFA)

1. Willy Meyer Pleite (United Left within EUL/NGL)
2. Raül Romeva (Initiative for Catalonia Greens within Greens-EFA)

On the Union, Progress and Democracy list: (no group)

1. Francisco Sosa Wagner

On the Europe of the Peoples–Greens list: (Greens-EFA)

1. Oriol Junqueras (Republican Left of Catalonia) (until 31/12/2011)
2. Ana Miranda Paz (Galician Nationalist Bloc) (from 01/2012, replaced by Iñaki Irazabalbeitia in 2013)

=== Sweden ===
Sweden elected 18 MEPs, which increased to 20 from 1 December 2011.

On the Social Democrats list: (PASD)

1. Göran Färm
2. Anna Hedh
3. Olle Ludvigsson
4. Jens Nilsson (from 1 December 2011)
5. Marita Ulvskog
6. Åsa Westlund

On the Moderate Party list: (EPP Group)

1. Anna Maria Corazza Bildt
2. Christofer Fjellner
3. Gunnar Hökmark
4. Anna Ibrisagic

On the Liberal People's Party list: (ALDE)

1. Marit Paulsen
2. Olle Schmidt
3. Cecilia Wikström

On the Green Party list: (Greens-EFA)

1. Isabella Lövin
2. Carl Schlyter

On the Pirate Party list: (Greens-EFA)

1. Amelia Andersdotter (from 1 December 2011)
2. Christian Engström

On the Left Party list: (EUL/NGL)

1. Eva-Britt Svensson (replaced by Mikael Gustafsson)

On the Centre Party list: (ALDE)

1. Lena Ek (replaced by Kent Johansson)

On the Christian Democrats list: (EPP Group)

1. Alf Svensson

=== United Kingdom ===
The United Kingdom elected 72 MEPs, which increased to 73 from 1 December 2011.

==== Great Britain ====
On the Conservative Party list: (ECR)

1. Richard Ashworth
2. Robert Atkins
3. Philip Bradbourn
4. Martin Callanan
5. Giles Chichester
6. Nirj Deva
7. James Elles
8. Vicky Ford
9. Jacqueline Foster
10. Ashley Fox
11. Julie Girling
12. Daniel Hannan
13. Malcolm Harbour
14. Roger Helmer
15. Syed Kamall
16. Sajjad Karim
17. Timothy Kirkhope
18. Emma McClarkin
19. Edward McMillan-Scott
20. Struan Stevenson
21. Robert Sturdy
22. Kay Swinburne
23. Charles Tannock
24. Geoffrey Van Orden
25. Marina Yannakoudakis

On the UK Independence Party list: (EFD)

1. Stuart Agnew
2. Marta Andreasen
3. Gerard Batten
4. Godfrey Bloom
5. John Bufton
6. David Campbell Bannerman
7. Derek Clark
8. Trevor Colman
9. William, Earl of Dartmouth
10. Nigel Farage
11. Mike Nattrass
12. Paul Nuttall
13. Nikki Sinclaire

On the Labour Party list: (PASD)

1. Michael Cashman
2. Mary Honeyball
3. Richard Howitt
4. Stephen Hughes
5. David Martin
6. Linda McAvan
7. Arlene McCarthy
8. Claude Moraes
9. Brian Simpson
10. Peter Skinner
11. Catherine Stihler
12. Derek Vaughan
13. Glenis Willmott

On the Liberal Democrats list: (ALDE)

1. Catherine Bearder
2. Sharon Bowles
3. Chris Davies
4. Andrew Duff
5. Fiona Hall
6. Sarah Ludford
7. Liz Lynne (replaced by Phil Bennion)
8. George Lyon
9. Bill Newton Dunn
10. Diana Wallis (replaced by Rebecca Taylor)
11. Graham Watson

On the Greens (E&W) list: (Greens-EFA)

1. Jean Lambert
2. Caroline Lucas (replaced by Keith Taylor)

On the British National Party list: (no group)

1. Andrew Brons
2. Nick Griffin

On the Scottish National Party list: (Greens-EFA)

1. Ian Hudghton
2. Alyn Smith

On the Plaid Cymru list: (Greens-EFA)

1. Jillian Evans

==== Northern Ireland ====
On the Sinn Féin list: (EUL/NGL)

1. Bairbre de Brún (replaced by Martina Anderson)

On the Democratic Unionist Party list: (no group)

1. Diane Dodds

On the Ulster Conservatives and Unionists – New Force list: (ECR)

1. Jim Nicholson

== See also ==
- 2009 European Parliament election
- Members of the European Parliament 2009–2014
