= Siimes =

Surname list

Siimes is a surname. Notable people with the surname include:

- Pentti Siimes (1929–2016), Finnish actor
- Suvi-Anne Siimes (born 1963), Finnish politician
