= Saatsoglou =

Saatsoglou is a surname. Notable people with the surname include:

- Chrysoula Saatsoglou-Paliadeli (born 1947), Greek archaeologist and politician
- Gregory Orologas (1864–1922), Greek bishop, secular name Anastasios Saatsoglou
