= Eva Maydell =

Bulgarian politician (born 1986)

- Ева Майдел
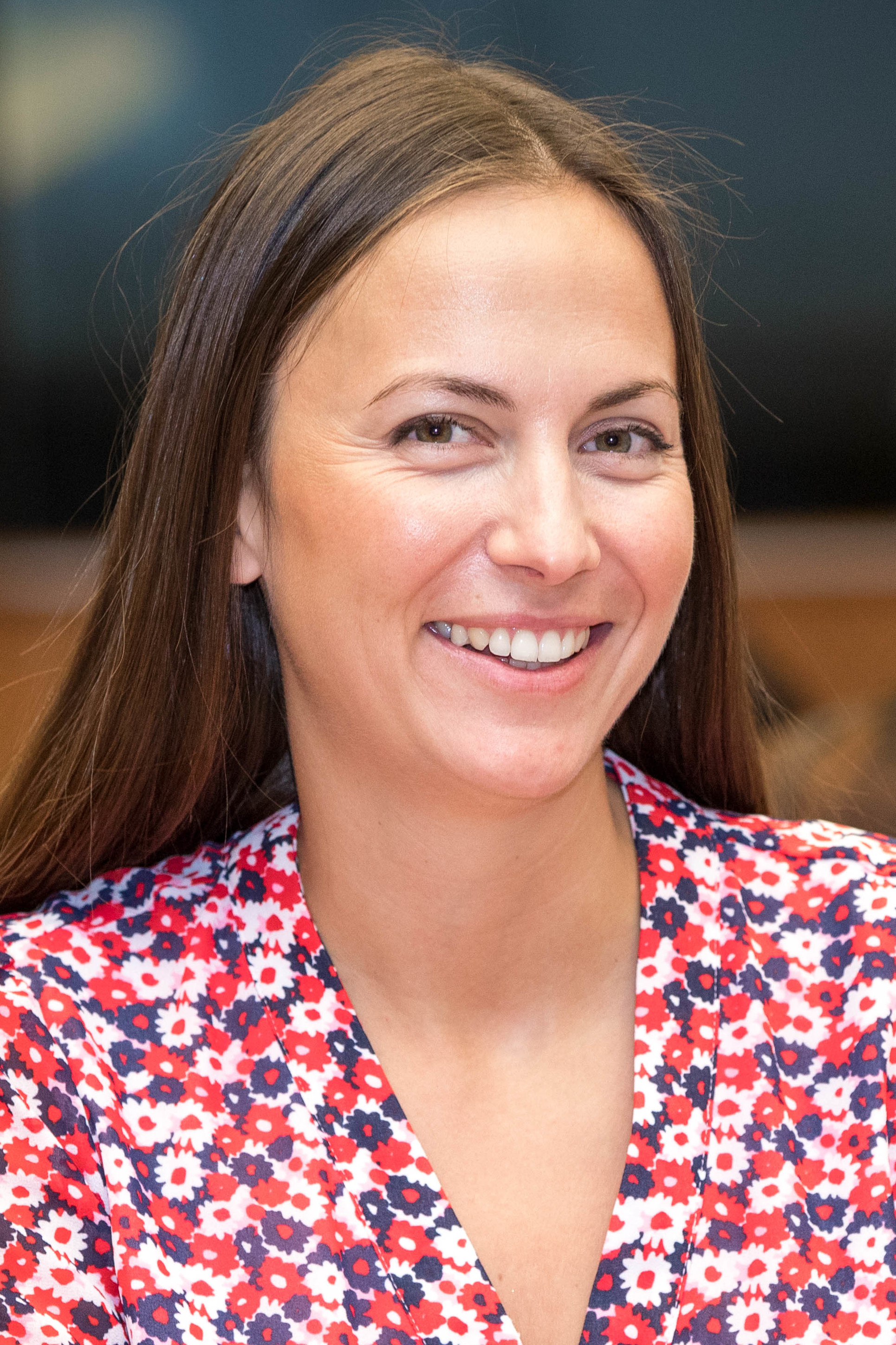
- Maydell in 2019

Member of the European Parliament for Bulgaria
- Incumbent
- Assumed office 1 July 2014
- Preceded by: Preslav Borissov

Personal details
- Born: Eva Konstantinova Paunova; 26 January 1986 (age 40) Sofia, PR Bulgaria
- Party: GERB
- Other political affiliations: European People's Party
- Spouse: Niklas Maydell (m. 2017)
- Education: John Cabot University (BA)
- Occupation: Politician

Eva Konstantinova Maydell (Bulgarian: Ева Константинова Майдел; née Paunova, Bulgarian: Паунова; born 26 January 1986) is a Bulgarian politician who is a Member of the European Parliament (MEP). A member of the GERB party, she also served as the president of the European Movement International from 2017 to 2023.

Maydell was first elected to the European Parliament in 2014 at age 28, the youngest member of the EPP Group at the time. She was re-elected in 2019 and is serving her second term as an MEP. Maydell was awarded the "Best Newcomer MEP" award and the "New Technologies" award. She was featured in Forbes' "30 under 30" Europe selection and in Politico's 40 most influential MEPs.

== Early life and education ==
Eva Maydell was born in Sofia on 26 January 1986. She is an alumna of John Cabot University in Rome.

== Political career ==
Maydell stood for the European Parliament and became one of Bulgaria's seventeen MEPs on 1 July 2014. At the time, she was the youngest member of the EPP Group. In her first term from 2014 until 2019, she served on the Committee on the Internal Market and Consumer Protection (IMCO) and the Committee on Economic and Monetary Affairs (ECON).

In 2019, Maydell was reelected to the European Parliament where she continues to serve on the ECON committee and on the Committee on Industry, Research and Energy (ITRE). She is a member of the Delegation for relations with Japan as well as the Delegation for relations with the United States. In 2020, Maydell will be the EPP Group rapporteur on the New European Data Strategy. Maydell is also the EPP Group Coordinator/Speaker in the Special Committee on Artificial Intelligence in the Digital Age.

Maydell is a member of the Young Members Network of the EPP Group comprising over 30 MEPs and 350 members of EU national parliaments. She is also co-chair of the European Parliament Digital and AI Intergroup. As of April 2024, although she had yet to announce that she was running for re-election as MEP, she was listed among the MEPs to watch ahead of the 2024 European Parliament election, being tipped as Bulgaria's next commissioner.

== Other activities ==
In 2015, Maydell co-founded "Education Bulgaria 2030" - a non-profit association of more than 40 organizations and individuals, which aims to motivate young people to develop their knowledge and skills and encourages businesses to hire young people. One of the organization's main goals is to reduce functional illiteracy by 2030 and to modernize the Bulgarian educational curriculum. In 2017, Maydell was the first woman and first Eastern European elected as President of European Movement International (EMI). In this role, Maydell hosts pan-European conferences, meetings, and initiatives that promote European unity and attempt to tackle some of Europe's biggest problems.

Maydell is the initiator of the yearly "Regulation4Innovation" conference in Brussels which brings together experts and businesspeople in the field of technology to discuss the latest developments in the sector. Maydell is a board member of the World Economic Forum's Digital Leaders of Europe, which seeks to develop and foster a Pan-European ecosystem by building bridges between founders, investors, and incubators as well as public figures and corporate representatives. She is also a Member of the Global Future Council of Europe. Maydell is a member of the council of the European Council on Foreign Relations (ECFR), a member of the board of trustees of Friends of Europe and a member of the federalist Spinelli Group.

== Recognition ==
In 2015, Parliament Magazine named Maydell the European Parliament's "Best Newcomer, and she made it into Politico's list of "people who shape Europe". In 2016, she was selected by Forbes for its best "30 under 30" Europe selection, and was also listed in Politico's 40 most influential MEPs. In 2017, Maydell won the Parliament Magazine "New Technologies" award. That same year, she was also named European Young Leader by the Brussels-based Friends of Europe think tank in 2017. In 2018, the Financial Times' named her among the "Top 100 Most Influential Persons in Central and Eastern Europe", and Politico's among the "Women who shape Brussels".

== Personal life ==
Maydell married Niklas Maydell, a mergers and acquisitions lawyer based in Brussels, in 2017.
