= 2009 European Parliament election in Finland =

- 7 June 2009

13 seats to the European Parliament

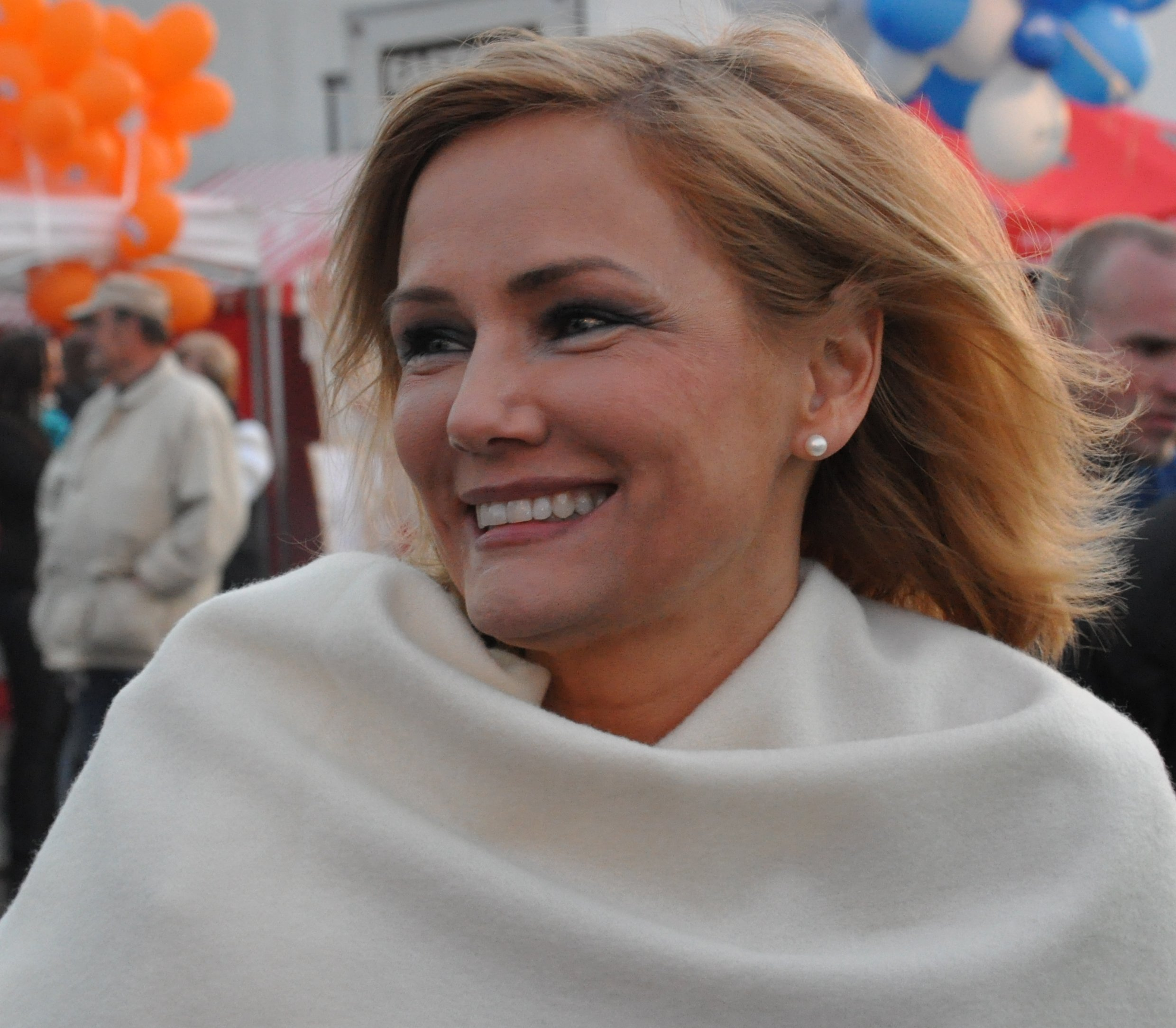
Finnish Member of the European Parliament Eija-Riitta Korhola at an EU election event in Turku, Finland 2009

An election of the delegation from Finland to the European Parliament was held in 2009.

Finland uses the open list D'Hondt method, where voters vote for an individual, but the individual's vote is counted primarily for the party and secondarily for the candidate. Parties receive seats in proportion to their share of the vote, and candidates from those parties are selected based on the votes they received individually. In European Parliament elections, the whole country forms a single constituency.

== Result ==
Compared to the 2004 European Parliament election in Finland, the three major parties National Coalition Party, Centre Party, and Social Democrats (SDP) each lost a seat. Moreover, the most popular candidate on the SDP list was the independent Mitro Repo. The Left Alliance lost their only seat. The Greens gained a seat, the Christian Democrats regained the seat they had lost in the previous period, and the True Finns achieved their first entry to the European Parliament with one seat. The Swedish People's Party kept their single seat. No extraparliamentary party gained any seats.

Party	Votes	%	Seats	+/–
National Coalition Party	386,416	23.21	3	–1
Centre Party	316,798	19.03	3	–1
Social Democratic Party	292,051	17.54	2	–1
Green League	206,439	12.40	2	+1
Finns Party	162,930	9.79	1	+1
Swedish People's Party	101,453	6.09	1	0
Left Alliance	98,690	5.93	0	–1
Christian Democrats	69,458	4.17	1	+1
Communist Party of Finland	8,089	0.49	0	0
For the Poor	4,338	0.26	0	0
Independence Party	3,563	0.21	0	New
Workers' Party of Finland	3,169	0.19	0	New
Finnish Senior Party	2,974	0.18	0	0
Independents	8,463	0.51	0	New
Total	1,664,831	100.00	13	–1
Valid votes	1,664,831	99.55		
Invalid/blank votes	7,603	0.45		
Total votes	1,672,434	100.00		
Registered voters/turnout	4,131,827	40.48		
Source: Tilastokeskus

=== Elected MEPs ===
- Ville Itälä (National Coalition Party)
- Sirpa Pietikäinen (National Coalition Party)
- Eija-Riitta Korhola (National Coalition Party)
- Anneli Jäätteenmäki (Centre Party)
- Hannu Takkula (Centre Party)
- Riikka Manner (Centre Party)
- Mitro Repo (Social Democratic Party, independent)
- Liisa Jaakonsaari (Social Democratic Party)
- Heidi Hautala (Green League)
- Satu Hassi (Green League)
- Timo Soini (Finns Party)
- Sari Essayah (Christian Democrats)
- Carl Haglund (Swedish People's Party)

=== Most voted-for candidates ===
Candidate Yleisradio	Party	Votes	Change	Quotient	Municipality
Timo Soini	True Finns	130,715		232 388,000	Espoo
Anneli Jäätteenmäki	Center Party	80,156	−69,490	316 798,000	Helsinki
Mitro Repo	Social Democratic Party	71,829		292 051,000	Helsinki
Ville Itälä	National Coalition Party	66,033	+594	386 416,000	Turku
Heidi Hautala	Green League	58,926		206 439,000	Helsinki
Satu Hassi	Green League	57,032	−17,682	103 219,500	Tampere
Sari Essayah	Christian Democrats	53,803		116 194,000	Paimio
Eija-Riitta Korhola	National Coalition Party	51,508	+16,223	193 208,000	Helsinki
Sirpa Pietikäinen	National Coalition Party	51,493	+21,451	128 805,333	Hämeenlinna
Risto E. J. Penttilä	National Coalition Party	50,881		96 604,000	Helsinki
Liisa Jaakonsaari	Social Democratic Party	45,325		146 025,500	Oulu
Hannu Takkula	Center Party	39,444	+6,705	158 399,000	Rovaniemi
Riikka Manner	Center Party	37,330		105 599,333	Varkaus
Lasse Hautala	Center Party	31,773		79 199,500	Kauhajoki
Kyösti Karjula	Center Party	29,387		63 359,600	Lumijoki
Annika Lapintie	Left Alliance	29,112		98 690,000	Turku
Petri Sarvamaa	National Coalition Party	27,391		77 283,200	Helsinki
Kimmo Kiljunen	Social Democratic Party	26,936	+14,285	97 350,333	Vantaa
Satu Taiveaho	Social Democratic Party	25,916		73 012,750	Hämeenlinna
Tarja Cronberg	Green League	22,205		68 813,000	Polvijärvi
