= Annika Lapintie =

Finnish politician (born 1955)

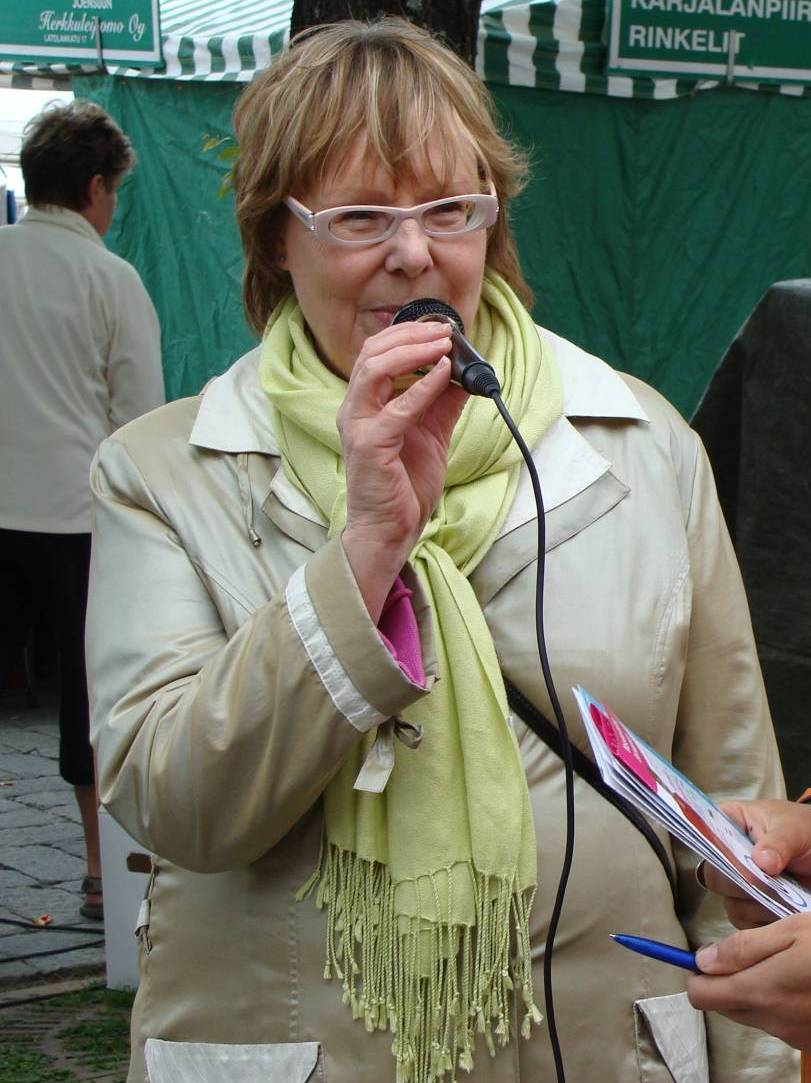

Finnish Member of Parliament
- In office 1995–2019

Personal details
- Born: 18 March 1955 (age 71) Turku, Finland
- Party: Left Alliance

Annika Anita Lapintie (née Hiltunen, born 18 March 1955) is a Finnish Left Alliance Member of Parliament (1995–2019) and Member of Turku City Council (1989–2012). Lapintie was the chairman of the Left Alliance parliamentary group in Finland from 2006 to 2015. He chaired the Constitutional Affairs Committee from 2015 to 2019.

== Biography ==
Lapintie was born in Turku. She graduated from the Kupittaa Community School in 1974. She began her university studies at Åbo Akademi, where she studied Swedish, Russian and education. From there she went on to study law at the University of Turku, where she graduated with a Bachelor of Laws in 1984. Lapintie qualified as a deputy judge and served as a notary and district judge in the Pargas Magistrate's Court from 1989 to 1990. In 1984, she completed a preparatory course in international affairs at the Ministry for Foreign Affairs.

Lapintie served in the Turku City Council from 1989 to 1995. She was elected to Parliament in the 1995 elections. Before being elected as a Member of Parliament, she worked as a branch manager at the Finnish National Workers' Savings Bank (1984–1988), as a lawyer at the Turku Labour District (1988–1995) and as a lawyer at the Labour and Economic Development Centre of Southwest Finland. Lapintie was also a member of the Representative Council of Tradeka from 1992 to 2016.

In 2011–2014 she was Vice-Chairman of the Grand Committee. She was also Vice-Chairman of the Committee on Transport and Communications from 1999 to 2003. Lapintie has been a full member of the Committee on Foreign Affairs (2007–2015), the Committee on Legal Affairs (1995–2003) and the Committee on Education (1995–1996), among others.

Lapintie was a candidate in the European Parliament elections held in June 2009. She received 29,112 votes, the highest within his party, but was not elected, and the Left Alliance remained without a seat in the European Parliament. Lapintie would have been elected if not for the electoral alliance between the Christian Democrats and the Finns Party, which enabled Sari Essayah to enter the parliament. Lapintie was also a candidate for the party in the EU elections in 2014.

Lapintie retired from the parliament in the 2019 parliamentary elections and did not run for office again.

In 2019, the Legal Policy Association Demla awarded Lapintie the 'Defender of Justice' recognition for actively promoting and ensuring the implementation of fundamental and human rights, as well as the rule of law principle.

Since 1983, Lapintie has been married to Pyry Lapintie, who works at the Turku office of Helsingin Sanomat.
