= Risto E. J. Penttilä =

Finnish politician

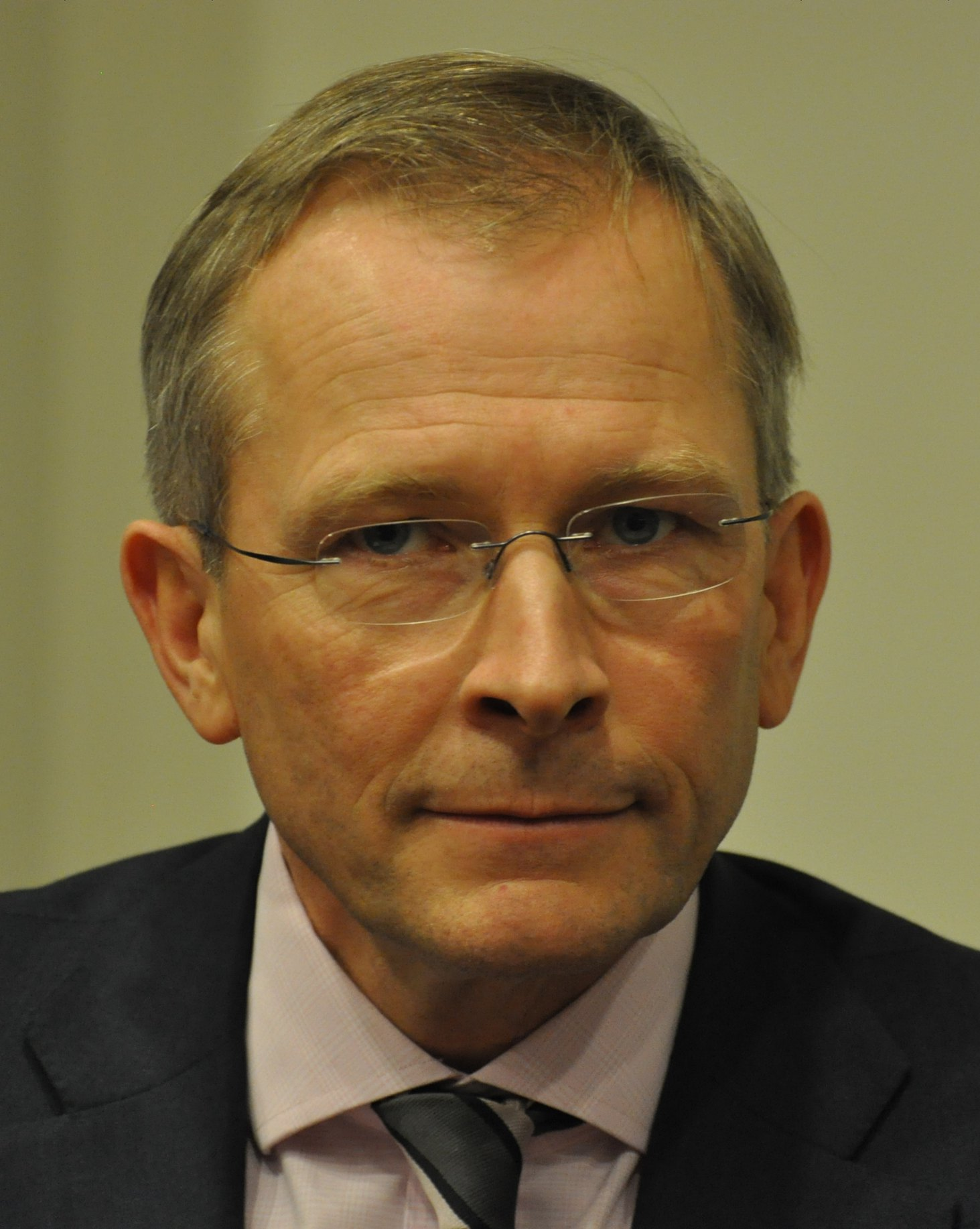

Personal details
- Born: 17 March 1959 (age 66)

Risto Erkki Juhani Penttilä (born 17 March 1959, Pori, Finland) is a policy expert, former member of the Finnish parliament, Secretary General of European Business Leaders’ Convention, former Director of the Finnish Business and Policy Forum (EVA) and current CEO of the pan-Nordic think tank Nordic West Office, an affiliate of the consulting house Miltton Group.

In the 2009 European Parliament election, Penttilä, representing the National Coalition Party, got 50,858 votes, becoming a substitute member in reserve.

== Education ==
- Doctor of Philosophy (International Relations), University College, Oxford 1989
- Master of Philosophy, University College, Oxford 1986
- Bachelor of Arts, Saybrook College, Yale University 1984

Penttilä was the first Finn to receive a Bachelor's degree from Yale. At University College, Oxford, he lived in the same room as Bill Clinton before him and Chelsea Clinton after him.

== Career ==
Penttilä was the CEO of Finland Chamber of Commerce from 2010-2017. He has also worked for McKinsey, the World Economic Forum and Oxford Analytica. He has been a columnist in the International Herald Tribune, the Financial Times, and Taloussanomat. He won the Finnish Cup football championship in the Lahden Reipas team in 1978. In Yale, Penttilä was selected to the Ivy league football team.

In 1994, he and several other people founded the Nuorsuomalaiset, a reform-oriented liberal political party. He was elected to the parliament in the 1995 elections. The party failed in the 1999 elections and was discontinued.

In the 2009 European Parliament election, he was a National Coalition Party candidate. Penttilä was endorsed by people such as former socialist leader Suvi-Anne Siimes, business leader Björn Wahlroos, ice-hockey coach Juhani Tamminen, and Finnish design leader Lenita Airisto. He was one of the most popular candidates, receiving 50,858 votes and the first deputy seat.

Penttilä has proposed English as an official "auxiliary language" in Finland. He has said: "A separate statute would specify for those foreigners who are living here - and those foreigners and companies who are moving to Finland - such areas, for instance of public administration, services, and taxation, in which documentation would also be printed and made available in English". Penttilä has encouraged open discussion about pension reform in Finland. Penttilä has argued that Finland should join NATO.

== Books ==
- Risto E. J. Penttilä: Historian roolipeli (Otava 2006)
- Risto E. J. Penttilä: The Role of the G8 in International Peace and Security (Oxford University Press 2003).
- Risto E. J. Penttilä & al.: Ultimatum isänmaalle. Nuorsuomalainen näkemys Suomen mahdollisuuksista (Otava 1994)
- Risto E. J. Penttilä: Finland’s Search for Security through Defence 1944-89 (Macmillan 1991)
- Risto E. J. Penttilä: Puolustuslinjat : puolustuspolitiikka Suomen kansainvälisen aseman vakauttamisessa 1944-67 (Otava 1988)

== Interviews ==
- "Finland, Russia, and the NATO Question: An Interview with Risto Penttilä" by Henri Mattila, 01/16/2022.
