= European Parliament Special Committee on the Financial, Economic and Social Crisis =

The Special Committee on the Financial, Economic and Social Crisis (CRIS) was a special committee of the European Parliament. It was created in October 2009 to assess the fallout from the 2008 financial crisis and the Great Recession and make recommendations to prevent a similar upheaval. A significant resolution was adopted in October 2010. It is codified in what is known as a mid-term report, however, because the mandate was extended to July 2011. Then, a final resolution was adopted. The work of the committee is important in relation to drafting policy in the areas of EU financial supervision and governance, in the context of the Euro area crisis.

== Members ==
Name	Position
Wolf Klinz	Chair
Pervenche Berès	Rapporteur
Stephan Paul	Consultant

== See also ==
- Wall Street and the Financial Crisis: Anatomy of a Financial Collapse
- European System of Financial Supervisors
- Committees of the European Parliament
