= Suvi-Anne Siimes =

Finnish politician (born 1963)

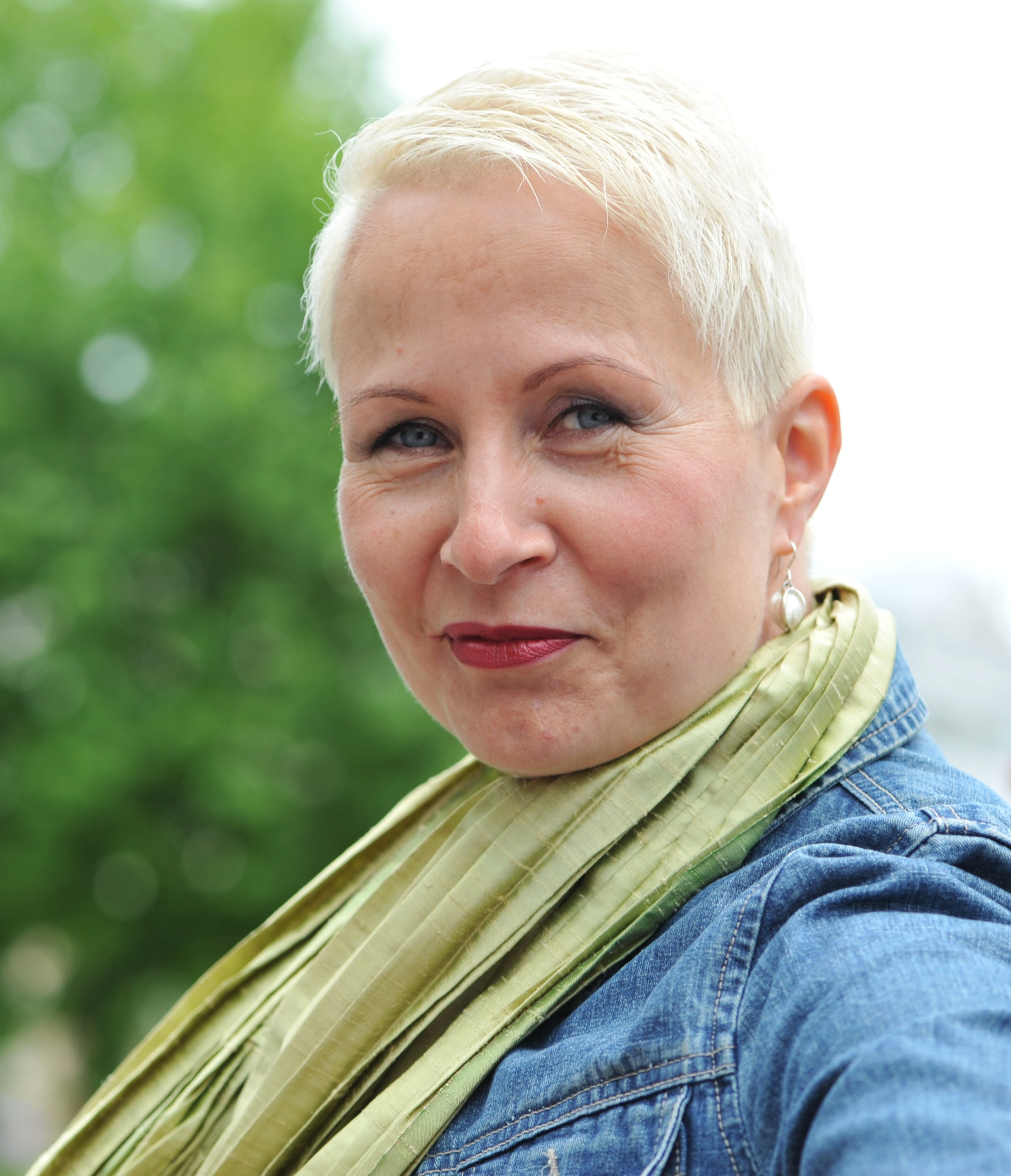
Suvi-Anne Siimes in July 2009

Sini Maaria Suvi-Anne Siimes (born 1 June 1963, in Helsinki) is a former chair of the Finnish Left Alliance. She quit the party in 2006 over disagreements about running former taistoists (orthodox pro-Soviet communists).

Before her political career, she had several short teaching posts at University of Helsinki and Kauppakorkeakoulu and she was planning a scientist / researcher career in economic sciences.

Her political career started in local politics in Pohja (a small town in South-Western Finland).

She was chairperson of the Finnish Left Alliance 1998–2006 and was a member of the Finnish Parliament (Eduskunta) from 1999 to 2007. She served as a member of the Foreign Affairs Committee and as a Finnish delegate at the Nordic Council. In the two cabinets of Paavo Lipponen (1995–2003) Siimes served as the Coordinate Minister for Culture (1998–1999) and as the Minister of Finance (1999–2003). From 1995 to 2000, she was a deputy member of the European Union Committee on Regional Development.

In March 2006 she resigned from the Left Alliance, stating she didn't want to support the election of former taistoists like Jaakko Laakso to the Parliament of Finland in the next elections in 2007 and that she could not continue in politics having been unsuccessful in making the Left Alliance into what she termed a "modern" leftist political party with "modern European attitudes" and practices.

In her book, Politiikan julkisivu, published in March 2007 after her departure from politics, she goes into further detail about what made her leave her career in politics.

In the 2009 European elections, Siimes endorsed Risto Penttilä, a National Coalition Party candidate.

Siimes is now working as Director General of Pharma Industry Finland.

She was appointed Chairman of the Board of Veikkaus (the Finnish National Lottery) on 16 March 2011.

Siimes has a licentiate (advanced degree) in economics.

== Publications ==
- Amerikan päiväkirja ja muita kirjoituksia (2000)
- Politiikan piilokuvat (2002)
- Politiikan julkisivu (2007)
