= Niki Tzavela =

Greek politician

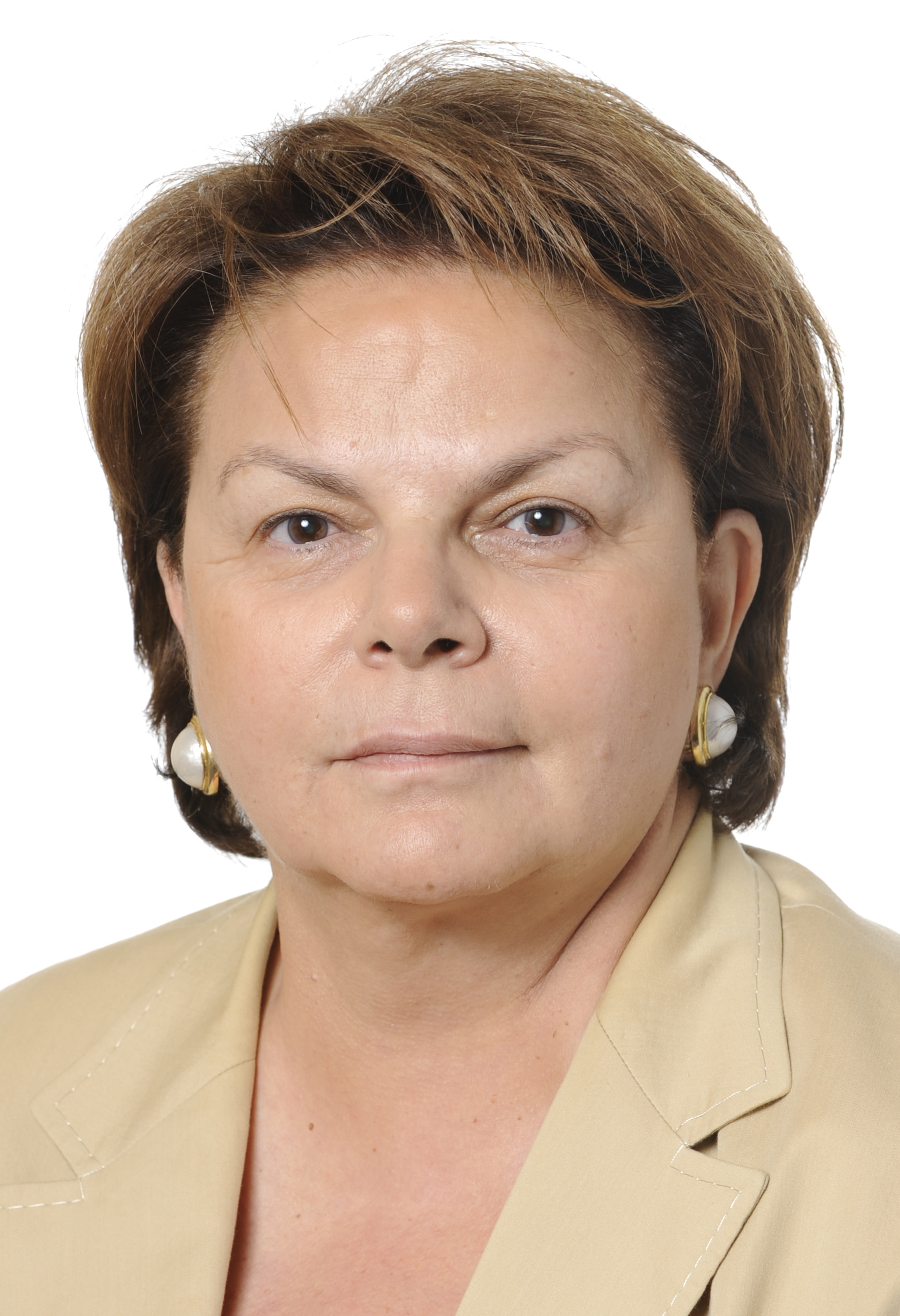

Member of the European Parliament for Greece
- In office 2009–2014

Niki Tzavela (Greek: Νίκη Τζαβέλλα; born 30 June 1947 in Lamia) is 1 of the 22 Greek MEPs in the European Parliament. She was a Greek MEP in the European Parliament (2009 – 2014) She is Vice-Chair of the Delegation for Relations with the United States of America and Vice-Chair of the Europe of Freedom and Democracy Group in the European Parliament. She is a Member of the Committee on Industry, Research, and Energy and a Member of the Delegation to the EU-Turkey Joint Parliamentary Committee. She has also been an MP in the Greek parliament between 1994 and 1996 with the New Democracy Party.

Former non political positions include Head of the Greek Manpower Employment Organisation (1989-1993), Vice-Chair of the Athens 2004 Olympic Games Organising Committee (OEOA), and Vice-Chair of the Kokkalis Foundation.

Niki Tzavela attained her bachelor's degree in Industrial Psychology from Howard University in Washington, DC and her Master's in Labour Economics from Leeds University.

She served on the Dean's Council of the Kennedy School of Government at Harvard University.
