= Silvia Adriana Țicău =

Romanian politician (born 1970)

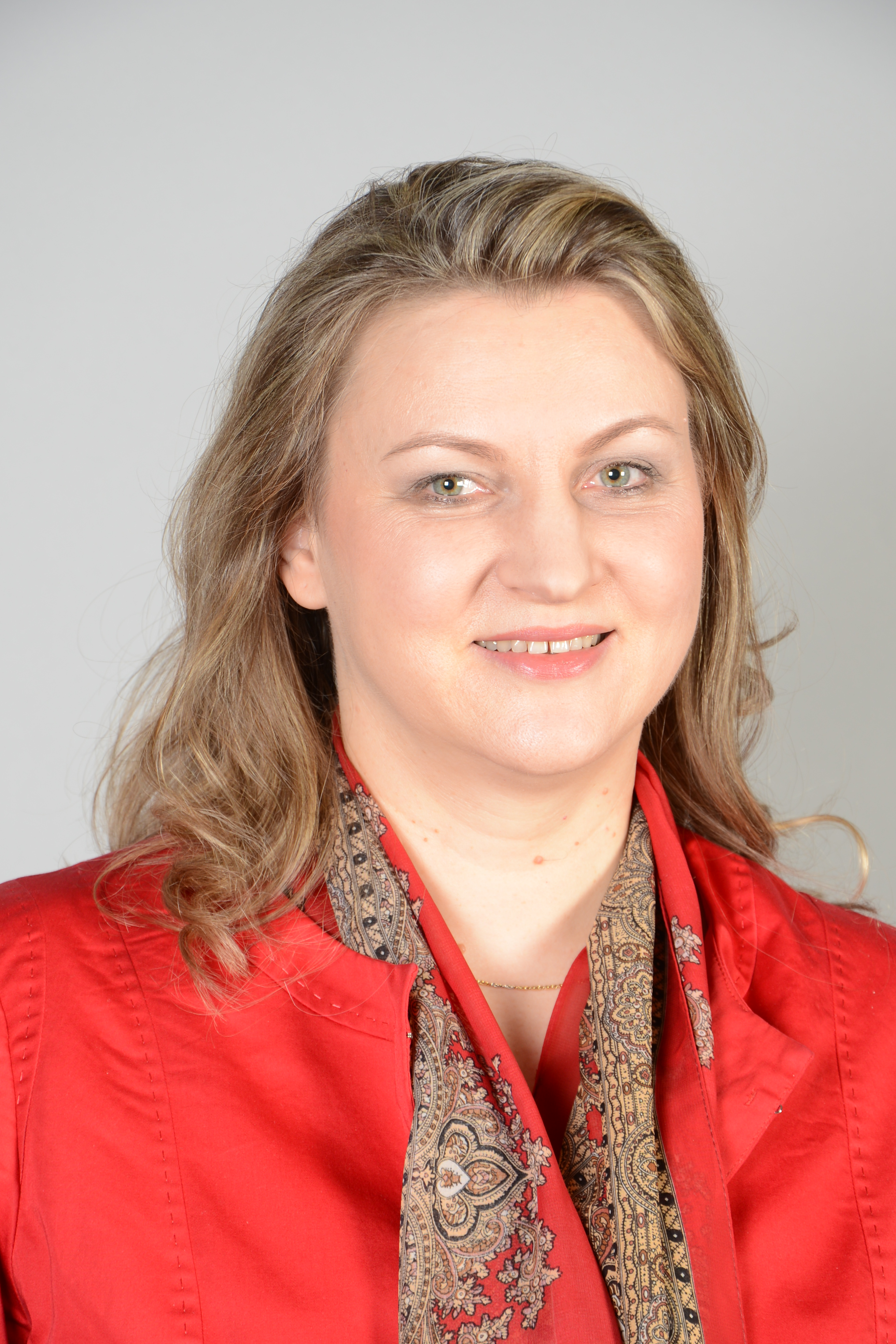
Silvia Adriana Țicău

Silvia Adriana Țicău (born 14 November 1970 in Galaţi) is a Romanian politician and Member of the European Parliament. She is a member of the Social Democratic Party, part of the Party of European Socialists, and became an MEP on 1 January 2007 with the accession of Romania to the European Union.
