= Britta Thomsen =

Danish politician

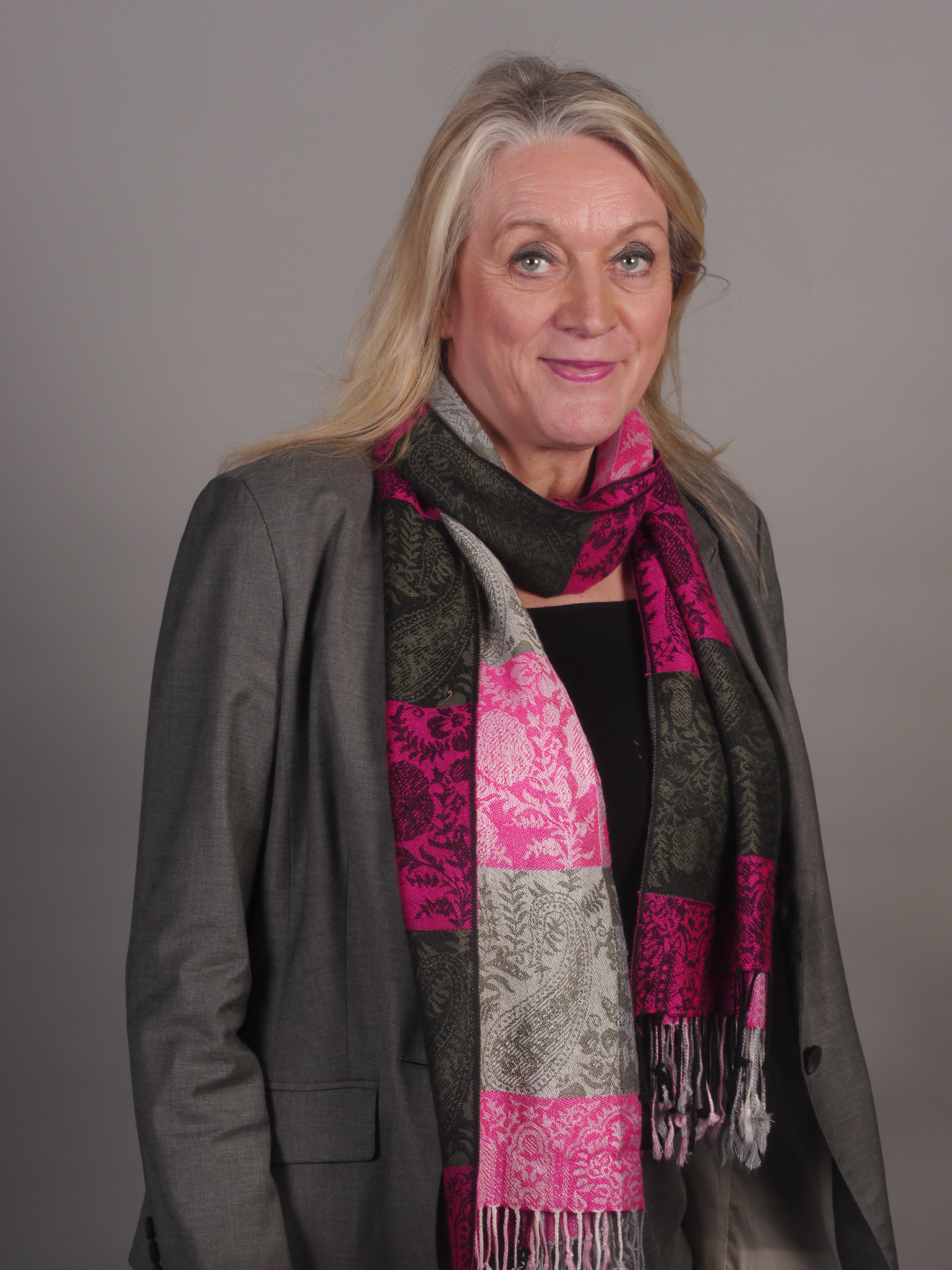
Britta Thomsen

Britta Thomsen (born 23 January 1954 in Aalborg) is a Danish politician who served as a Member of the European Parliament from 2004 until 2014. She is a member of the Social Democrats, which is part of the Party of European Socialists.

In parliament, Thomsen served as vice-chair of the Committee on Industry, Research and Energy. She was also a member of the Committee on Women's Rights and Gender Equality, a substitute for the Committee on Development, and vice-chair of the Delegation for relations with South Africa. She supported the Manifesto of the Spinelli Group.

== Career ==
- Scholarship, Nordic Africa Institute, Uppsala (1979)
- Studies in Portuguese language and culture, University of Lisbon (1979–1980)
- Studies in Portuguese and Spanish, Aarhus University (1980–1983)
- MA (History), Aarhus University
- Teacher and organiser of adult education (1983–1989)
- Consultant (various contracts)
- Consultant, HK (Union of Commercial and Clerical Employees in Denmark), responsible for international projects and surveys in the tourism and service industries (1994–2000)
- Director and owner of Facilitate (consultancy), working with labour market issues at European level (2001–2004)
- With the Danish Social Democrats
- Member of the party programme committee (2000)
- Publications: articles about Portugal in various Danish magazines
