= Sirpa Pietikäinen =

Finnish politician (born 1959)

Sirpa Pietikäinen MEP
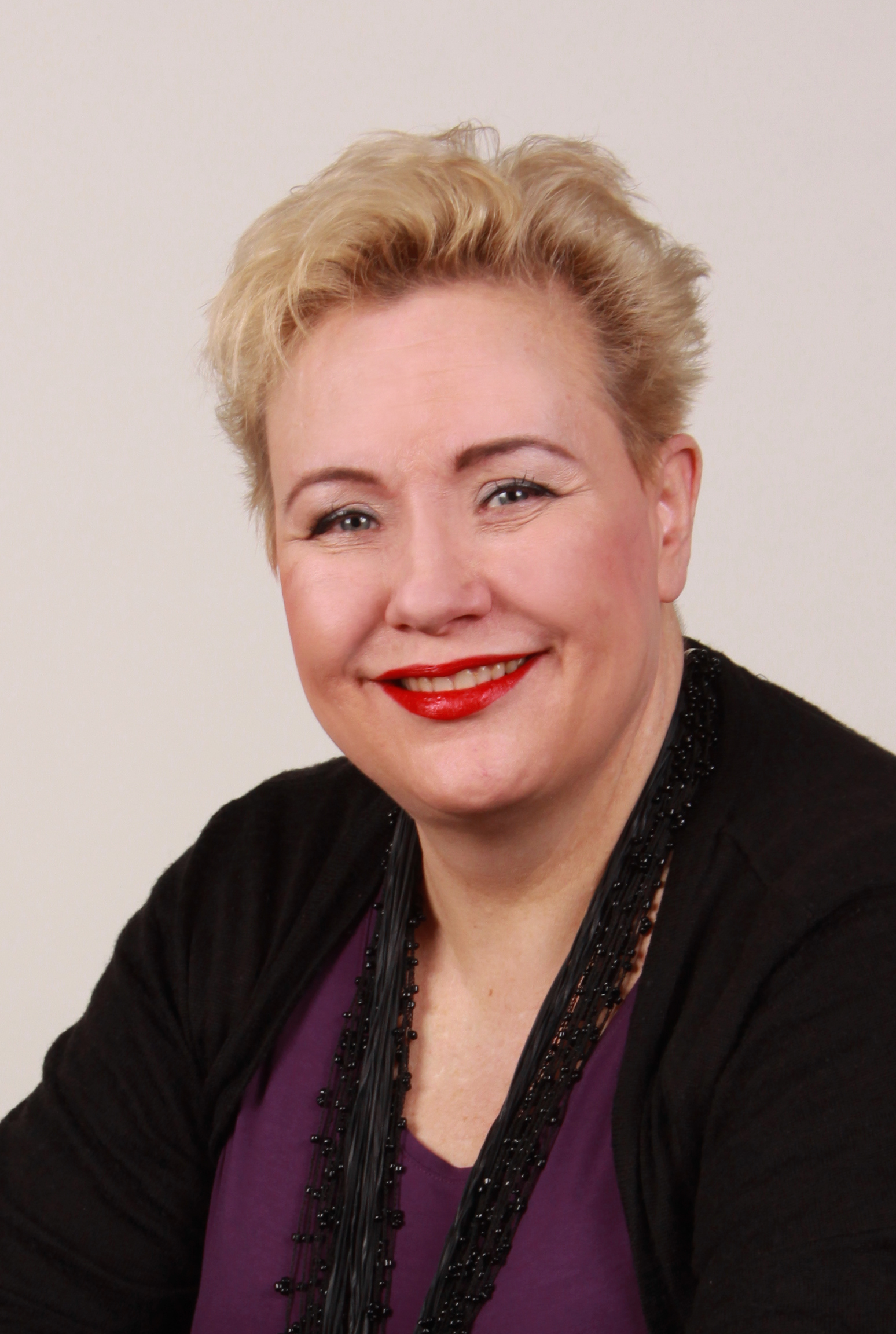

Member of the European Parliament
- Incumbent
- Assumed office 1 December 2024
- Constituency: Finland
- In office 4 April 2008 – 15 July 2024
- Constituency: Finland

Minister for the Environment
- In office 26 April 1991 – 13 April 1995
- Prime Minister: Esko Aho
- Preceded by: Kaj Bärlund
- Succeeded by: Pekka Haavisto

Member of the Finnish Parliament
- In office 26 March 1983 – 18 March 2003
- Constituency: Häme

Personal details
- Born: 19 April 1959 (age 67) Parikkala, Finland
- Party: Finland; National Coalition Party; EU; European People's Party
- Spouse: Tapio Määttä
- Education: Aalto University
- Website: sirpapietkäinen.net

Sirpa Pietikäinen (born 19 April 1959) is a Finnish politician and Member of the European Parliament (MEP) from Finland. She is a former member of the National Coalition Party, part of the European People's Party.

She has been a Member of the European Parliament (MEP) since 2008, and was re-elected in 2009, 2014 and 2019. In the 2024 elections, Pietikäinen was not elected and was placed on the reserve list. When Henna Virkkunen stepped down as an MEP to become a European Commissioner on 30 Nov 2024, Pietikäinen became an MEP again.

== Political career ==
=== Role in national politics ===
Pietikäinen was in the Hämeenlinna town council (1981-1992). She was elected to the Finnish Parliament at the age of 23 in 1983. She was then a Member of Finnish Parliament until 2003 and served as Minister for the Environment in the cabinet of Prime Minister Esko Aho between 1991 and 1995.

Pietikäinen was the Chair of Finnish United Nations Association between 1996 and 2007. She was the World Federation of United Nations Associations chairwoman between 2000 and 2004. She has also worked for the International Institute for Democracy and Electoral Assistance and One World International.

=== European platform and elections ===
Pietikäinen sees the European Union should proceed towards a Europe of people, which guarantees the respect of human rights, equal opportunities for all, social inclusion and the access to high quality services. In her opinion, the Union needs to further involve organisations and citizens in the community decision-making process, from the preparatory phase of the work onwards. Also the Union should be more transparent.

Pietikäinen states that the objectives and strategies, such as the Lisbon Strategy, are not enough. The Union would need an enhanced surveillance of the financial sector, obligations in terms of solvability as well as transparency in Europe and worldwide. She also supports reinforcing cooperation and negotiation procedures between employees and trade unions, in order to contribute to the stabilisation of growth. The future growth, in her opinion, spurs from investments in the education and research sectors, in particular in green business.

When it comes to the environment, Pietikäinen states that political will is at the core of the environmental challenges: Europe should build an ecologically sustainable model in terms of way of life, transport, production and consumption, as well as the economic and legislative tools which will allow the shift towards this model.

During her campaign for the 2014 European elections, Pietikäinen spent a total of €183,700, making her the biggest spender of the country's 13 elected MEPs. According to a Finnish media report, a third of Pietikäinen's budget was a bank loan, she contributed €49,000 from her own pocket and received €10,000 from the Trade Union Pro, Finland's largest private sector union.

=== Member of the European Parliament ===
Pietikäinen has been a Member of the European Parliament since 2008. She first came to the European parliament to replace Alexander Stubb in 2008, and was re-elected in the 2009 European elections and 2014. In parliament, she is a member of the European People's Party Group (EPP).

Upon entering parliament, Pietikäinen first was a member of the Committee on the Environment, Public Health and Food Safety from 2009 to 2012 and then vice-chairwoman of the Committee on the Internal Market and Consumer Protection between 2012 and 2014. Since 2014, she has been serving on the Committee on Economic and Monetary Affairs. In addition to her committee assignments, she has been a member of the parliament's delegation for relations with the People's Republic of China since 2009.

In her capacity as alternate member of the Committee on the Environment, Public Health and Food Safety, she authored a report on organic farming in 2015 and served as rapporteur on the circular economy.

Pietikäinen also serves as vice-president of the European Parliament Intergroup on LGBT Rights; as board member of the European Parliament Intergroup on the Welfare and Conservation of Animals; as member of the European Parliament Intergroup on Children's Rights; as member of the European Parliament Intergroup on Youth Issues; as member of the European Parliament Working Group on Reproductive Health, HIV/AIDS and Development; as a vice-chairwoman of the cross-party Working Group on Fair Trade (sponsored by Fair Trade Advocacy); and as member of the MEP Heart Group (sponsored by the European Heart Network (EHN) and the European Society of Cardiology (ESC)). She is part of the Elie Wiesel Network of Parliamentarians for the Prevention of Genocide and Mass Atrocities and against Genocide Denial as well as of the MEP Alliance for Mental Health.

Pietikäinen served as rapporteur also for the proposal on funds for venture capital and social entrepreneurship, which became regulation 2017/1991. She was also co-raporteur (with Dutch MEP Bas Eickhout) for the regulation on the EU Taxonomy for sustainable activities, approved in first reading in March 2019.

== Biography ==
=== Early life and education ===
Pietikäinen has an MBA degree from Helsinki School of Economics (1986). She has received The Knight Commander's Order of the White Rose of Finland (1993). She speaks Finnish, English, French, Swedish and German.

=== Publications ===
Her articles have been published in:

- Vanhuus kaupungissa, WSOY 1996
- Naisen seitsemän elämää, WSOY 1998
- Maapallohaaste, Otava 1999
- Kaikesta jää jälki, Avain 2008
- Making the Green Energy Switch at a Time of Crisis (2009)
- Mitä Jussi Halla-Aho tarkoittaa?, Savukeidas 2010

=== Other ===
Sirpa Pietikäinen is member of:

- World Future Council
- Energy Watch Group (EWG)

In 2003, Pietikäinen was convicted of aggravated drunk driving after moving her car in a parking lot at midnight. She was fined, given a suspended prison sentence and banned from driving for five months.

Political offices
Preceded by Kaj Bärlund	Minister for the Environment; 1991–1995	Succeeded by Pekka Haavisto
