= Salvatore Iacolino =

Italian politician

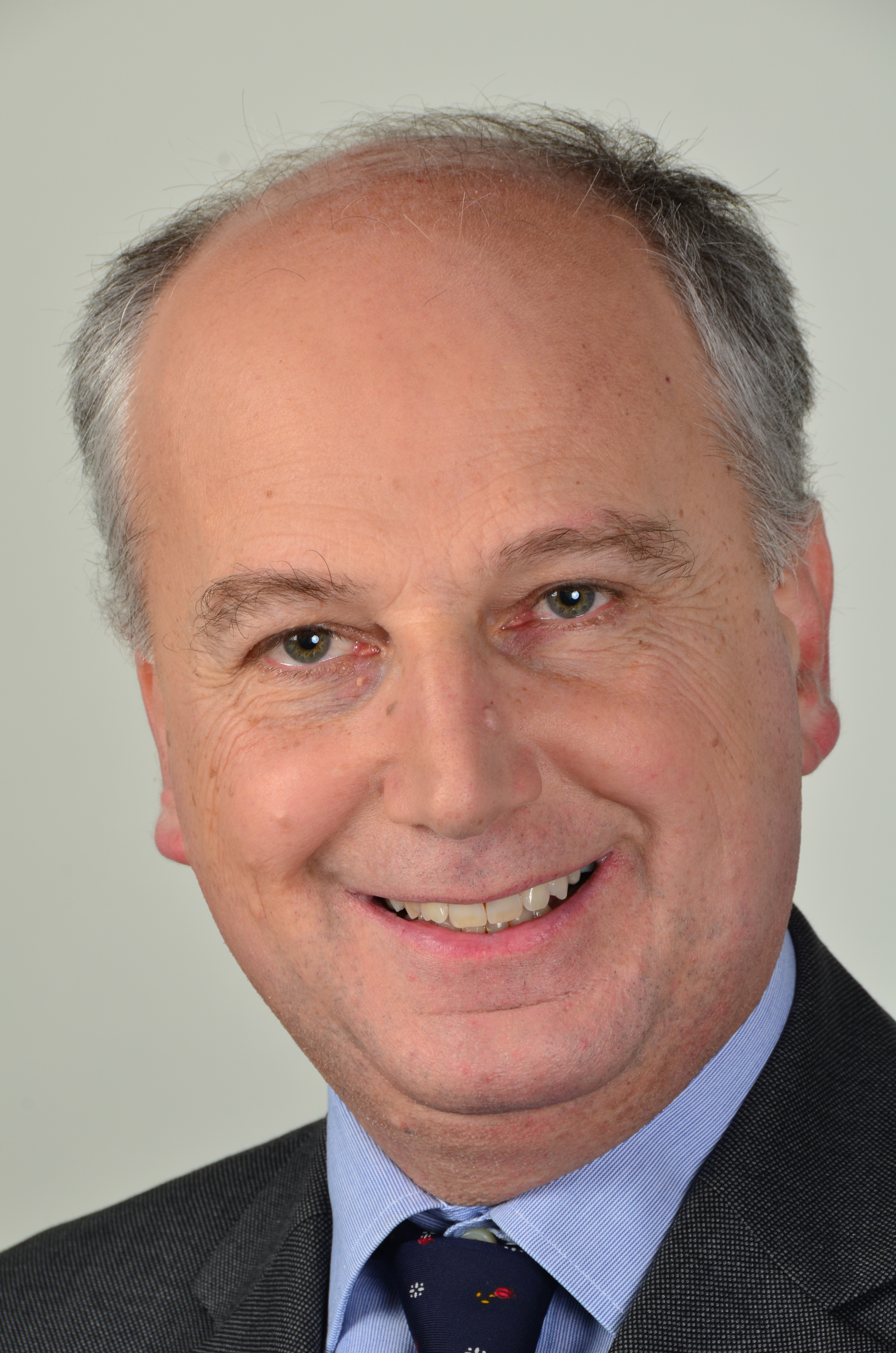

Member of the European Parliament for Insular Italy
- In office 2009–2014

Personal details
- Born: 18 November 1963 (age 62) Favara, Sicily, Italy
- Party: FI (until 2009); PdL (2009–2013); GS (2013); FI (2013–2017); UDC (2017–2019); FI (2019–present)
- Children: Giorgia and Luca
- Education: University of Palermo

Salvatore Iacolino (born 18 November 1963, Favara) is an Italian politician.

== Early life and career ==
In 1981 he graduated from the classical high school in Agrigento. He graduated in Law from the University of Palermo and from 1992 became an official and manager of the Public Administration in the health sector in the province of Agrigento. He became the administrative director of the ASL n. 1 of Agrigento (2001-2005). In 2005 he was appointed by the regional council chaired by Salvatore Cuffaro, general manager of the ASL n 6 of Palermo (until 2009).

== Politics ==
He was appointed municipal assessor of Agrigento from 1997 to 2001 by the mayor Calogero Sodano, in Forza Italia. On 6 and 7 June 2009 he ran for the European Parliament, being elected from the ranks of the People of Freedom. He officially took office on July 14 of the same year. He became Vice-President of the Commission for Civil Liberties, Justice and Home Affairs of the European Parliament until 2014.

In the Sicilian regional elections of 2012 he was a candidate for the Sicilian Regional Assembly on the list of the PDL in the Agrigento constituency, but he was not elected despite the 4,972 preferences. In the general election of 2013 he was candidate to the Senate with the Great South list in Sicily (in second place, behind Gianfranco Miccichè), he was not elected. It therefore joined Forza Italia.

In 2014 he was again a candidate to the European Parliament on the Forza Italia list, but he was not re-elected, so he returned as administrative manager to the provincial health authority of Agrigento.

In the Sicilian regional elections of November 5, 2017 he ran for the ARS again with the Union of the Centre in the province of Agrigento, but was not elected.
