= Mark Demesmaeker =

Mark Demesmaeker MEP
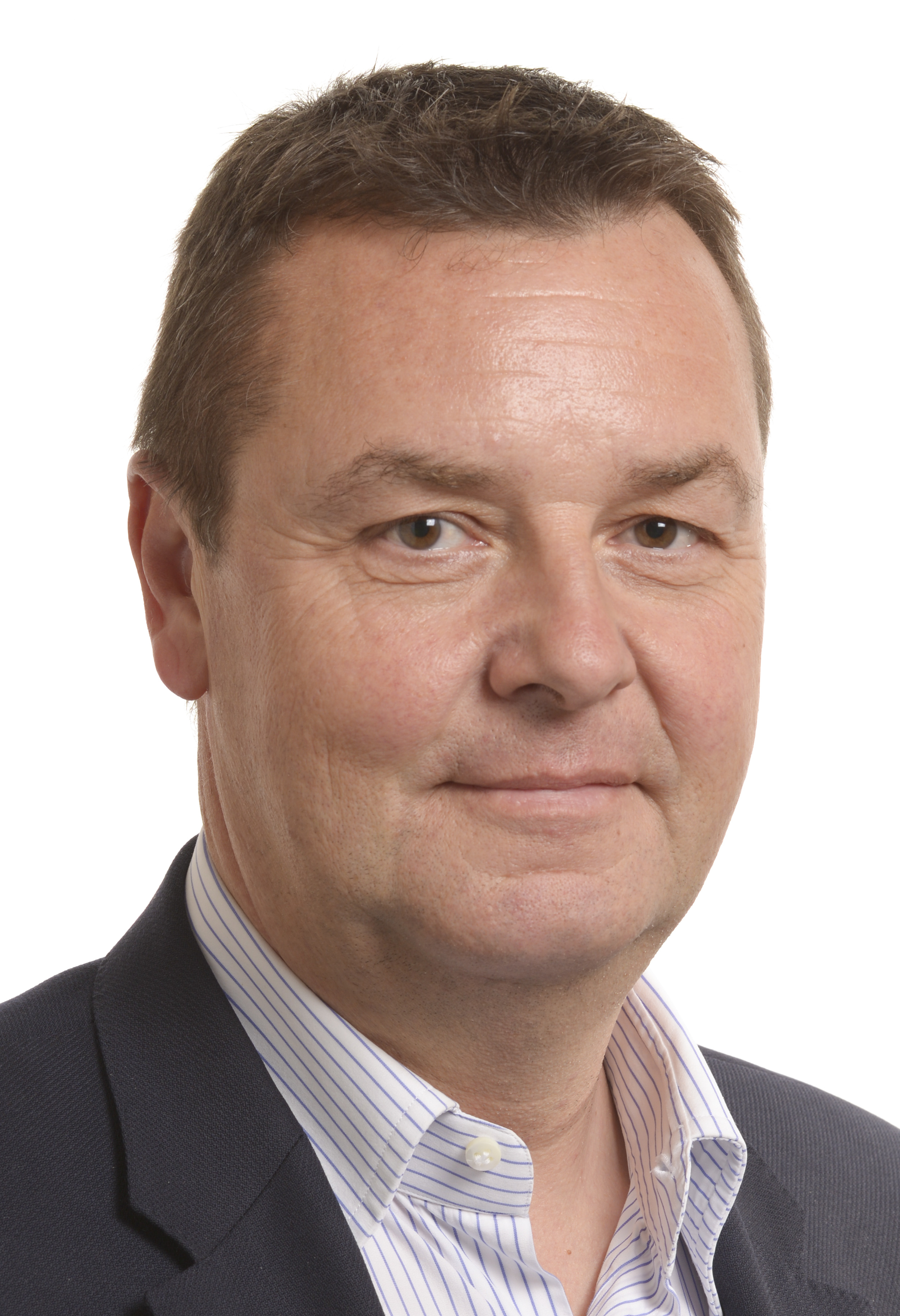

Member of the European Parliament for the Dutch-speaking electoral college
- In office 1 February 2013 – 1 July 2019
- Preceded by: Frieda Brepoels

Member of the Flemish Parliament
- In office June 2004 – 31 January 2013
- Succeeded by: Piet De Bruyn

Personal details
- Born: 12 September 1958 (age 68) Halle, Flemish Brabant
- Party: N-VA
- Website: http://www.markdemesmaeker.be/

Marc Victor Marie "Mark" Demesmaeker (Dutch: [mɑr(ə)ɡ dəˈmɛsmaːkər]; born 12 September 1958) is a Belgian TV journalist, newsreader and politician, affiliated to the New Flemish Alliance (N-VA).

== Career ==
Demesmaeker was born in Halle, Flemish Brabant, and originally trained as a teacher, teaching the subjects Dutch, English and History. He later changed careers to journalism, becoming a reporter for a travel programme on the public broadcaster VRT in 1991. Shortly after, he moved to the commercial channel VTM, where he worked as a news presenter until 2004. Demesmaeker also created and presented the gardening programme Groene Vingers (Green Fingers).

He was elected as a member of the Flemish Parliament in 2004 and reelected in 2009. In 2013, Demesmaeker left the Flemish Parliament to replace Frieda Brepoels (who became mayor of Bilzen) as member of the European Parliament. He was directly elected in 2014 to keep this position.

In 2006, he was elected to the City Council of Halle and became alderman. In 2012, he was reelected with the most preference votes, but a coalition was formed without his party.

Following the resignation of Frieda Brepoels, who was elected to the post of mayor in Bilzen, Mark Demesmaeker joined the European Parliament as N-VA MEP in February 2013. He was replaced in the Flemish Parliament by Piet De Bruyn. From February 2013 until May 2014, he sat with the Group of the Greens and the European Free Alliance (a group made up of ecologists and moderate regionalist and independentist parties with a centrist or liberal outlook).

In the European elections of 2014, Demesmaeker was re-elected with a resounding majority with 125,000 preferential votes. The N-VA received the greatest share of votes across the Flanders region and had 4 MEPs elected to the European Parliament, the single largest amount of MEPs ever sent by one party in Flanders to the European Parliament. In June the party moved to the European Conservatives and Reformists group, where Demesmaeker is head of the N-VA delegation.

In May 2015, Demesmaeker was placed on Vladimir Putin's black list of “undesirables” on Russian territory, rendering travel to Russia impossible under the present regime, due to his support of Ukraine in the war in Donbas. In August 2015, Demesmaeker was decorated with the Order of Merit, III Class by the President of Ukraine, Petro Poroshenko, for his 'important contribution to strengthening the international authority of the Ukrainian state'.

In March 2018, the Belgian prosecutor's office opened an investigation into Demesmaeker, after being notified by the tax collection office of an unpaid debt of 540.000 EUR. which was not denied by Demesmaeker.

Video Introduction (English) / (Dutch)
