= Britta Reimers =

German politician (born 1971)

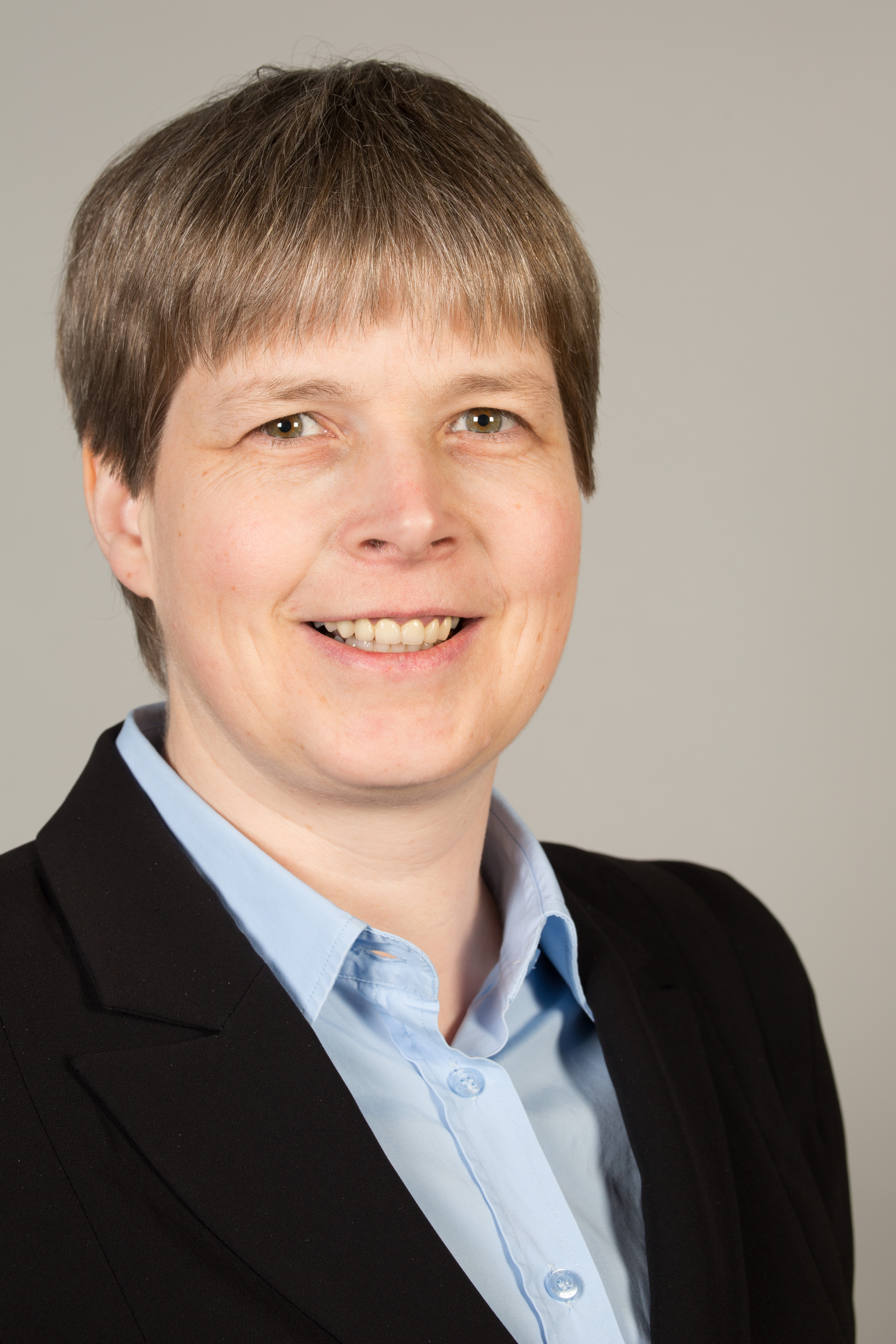

Member of the European Parliament
- In office 14 July 2009 – 30 June 2014
- Constituency: Germany

Personal details
- Born: 27 July 1971 (age 54) Itzehoe, Schleswig-Holstein Germany
- Party: German: Free Democratic Party; European Union: Alliance of Liberals and Democrats for Europe

Britta Reimers (born 27 July 1971) is a German politician. For one term from 2009 until 2014 she served as a Member of the European Parliament (MEP) representing Germany. She served as a member of the Free Democratic Party, part of the Alliance of Liberals and Democrats for Europe.

During her time in Parliament she served as a Member of the Committee on Agriculture and Rural Development and the Committee on Fisheries.

Reimers trained as a farmer and lives on her dairy farm in Steinburg.
