= Riikka Pakarinen =

Finnish politician (born 1981)

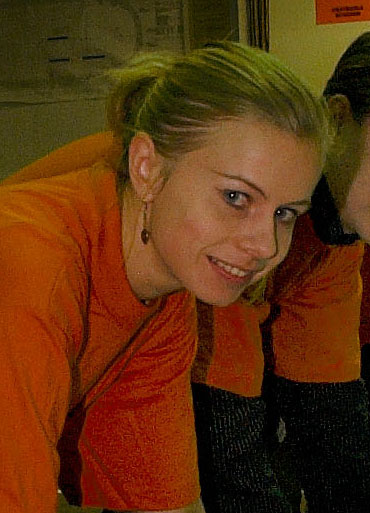
Riikka Manner in 2006

Riikka Pakarinen (née Pakarinen, formerly Manner; born August 24, 1981, in Varkaus, Finland) is a Finnish politician who served as a Member of the European Parliament from 2009 until 2014. She represents the Centre Party.

She was elected to the Varkaus city council in 2008. She has worked as a press assistant to Eero Reijonen, Risto Autio, and Paavo Väyrynen. In 2009, she was elected to the European Parliament.
