= Frieda Brepoels =

Flemish politician

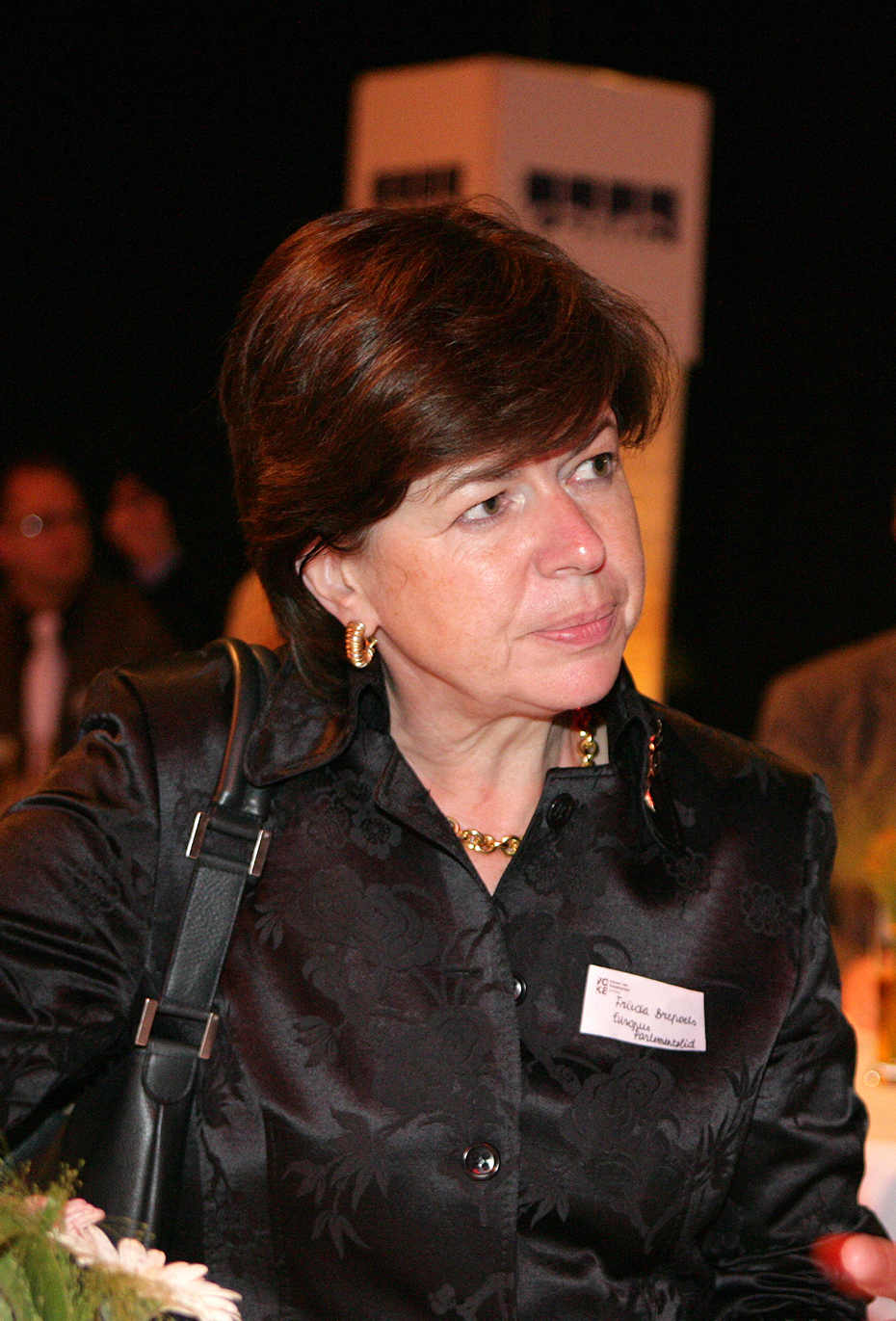
Frieda Brepoels

Frederika Marie Joseph "Frieda" Brepoels (Dutch: [ˈfriːdaː ˈbreːpuls]; born 7 May 1955 in Mopertingen) is a Belgian politician of N-VA, former mayor of Bilzen and former Member of the European Parliament for Flanders.

== Career ==
Brepoels is architect by profession, having studied architecture in Hasselt. She worked from 1978 to 1993 as an independent architect.

Brepoels started her political career in the People's Union (Volksunie, VU). Aged 27, she became municipal councillor in Bilzen in 1982. From 1985 until 1987, she was provincial councillor of Limburg.

From 1987 until 2003, she was member of the Chamber of Representatives, except for the period 1991–1999 when she was deputy in the provincial executive of Limburg.

She became Member of the European Parliament in 2004 as a substitute for Geert Bourgeois, who did not take up his seat. In the European Parliament, she sat on the Committee on the Environment, Public Health and Food Safety and she was a substitute for the Committee on Civil Liberties, Justice and Home Affairs, a member of the Delegation to the EU-Armenia, EU-Azerbaijan and EU-Georgia Parliamentary Cooperation Committees and a substitute for the Delegation for relations with the countries of the Andean Community.

Since 1 January 2013, following the October 2012 local elections, she is mayor of Bilzen. Mark Demesmaeker succeeded her in the European Parliament.

She was candidate for the Chamber of Representatives in the 2014 elections, but was not elected.

== Career ==
- 1978–1993: Self-employed architect
- 1988–2001: Member of the VU party council and executive
- since 2001: Vice-Chairwoman of the N-VA
- since 2001: Member of the administrative committee
- since 2001: Member of the party executive
- since 2001: Member of the party council
- since 2001: Member of the Limburg provincial executive and council
- 1982–1991: Member of the Bilzen Municipal Council
- 1982–1988: Deputy Mayor of Bilzen
- 1987–1991: Flemish Council (double mandate with the federal parliament)
- 1985–1987: Member of the Limburg Provincial Council
- 1991–1999: Member for Limburg
- 1987–1991 and 1999–2003: Member of the federal parliament
- 2000–2003: group chairwoman, House of Representatives

== See also ==
- 2004 European Parliament election in Belgium
