= Pervenche Berès =

French politician (born 1957)

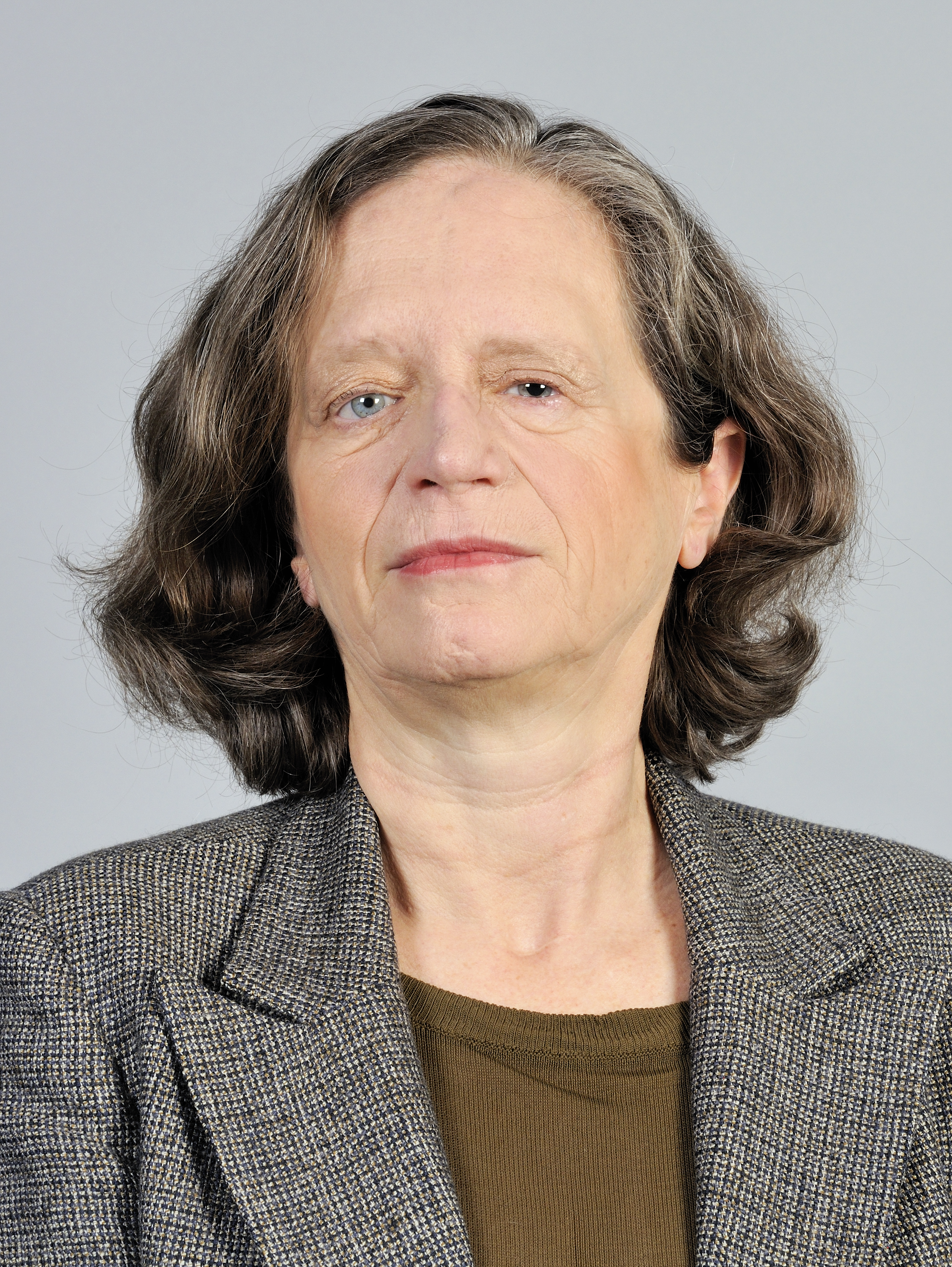

Personal details
- Born: 10 March 1957 (age 69) Paris, France
- Party: Socialist Party
- Education: Institute of Political Studies, Paris

Pervenche Berès (born 10 March 1957 in Paris) is a French politician who served as a Member of the European Parliament for the Île-de-France until 2019. She is a member of the Socialist Party, part of the Party of European Socialists.

== Political career ==
On 28 July 2004, Berès was elected Chair of the Committee on Economic and Monetary Affairs. She was the rapporteur of the Special Committee on the Financial, Economic and Social Crisis (CRIS).

Ahead of the Socialist Party's 2008 convention in Reims, Berès publicly endorsed Martine Aubry as candidate to succeed François Hollande at the party's leadership.

== Personal life ==
In 1995, Berès survived a near fatal traffic accident but lost half of her face, which was reconstructed by plastic surgery.

== Later career ==
In 2022, Berès was appointed by the Governing Council of the European Central Bank as a member of both the organizations’s Ethics Committee and the Audit Committee for a three-year term.
