= Peter Simon (politician) =

German politician and Member of the European Parliament (born 1967)

Peter Simon MEP
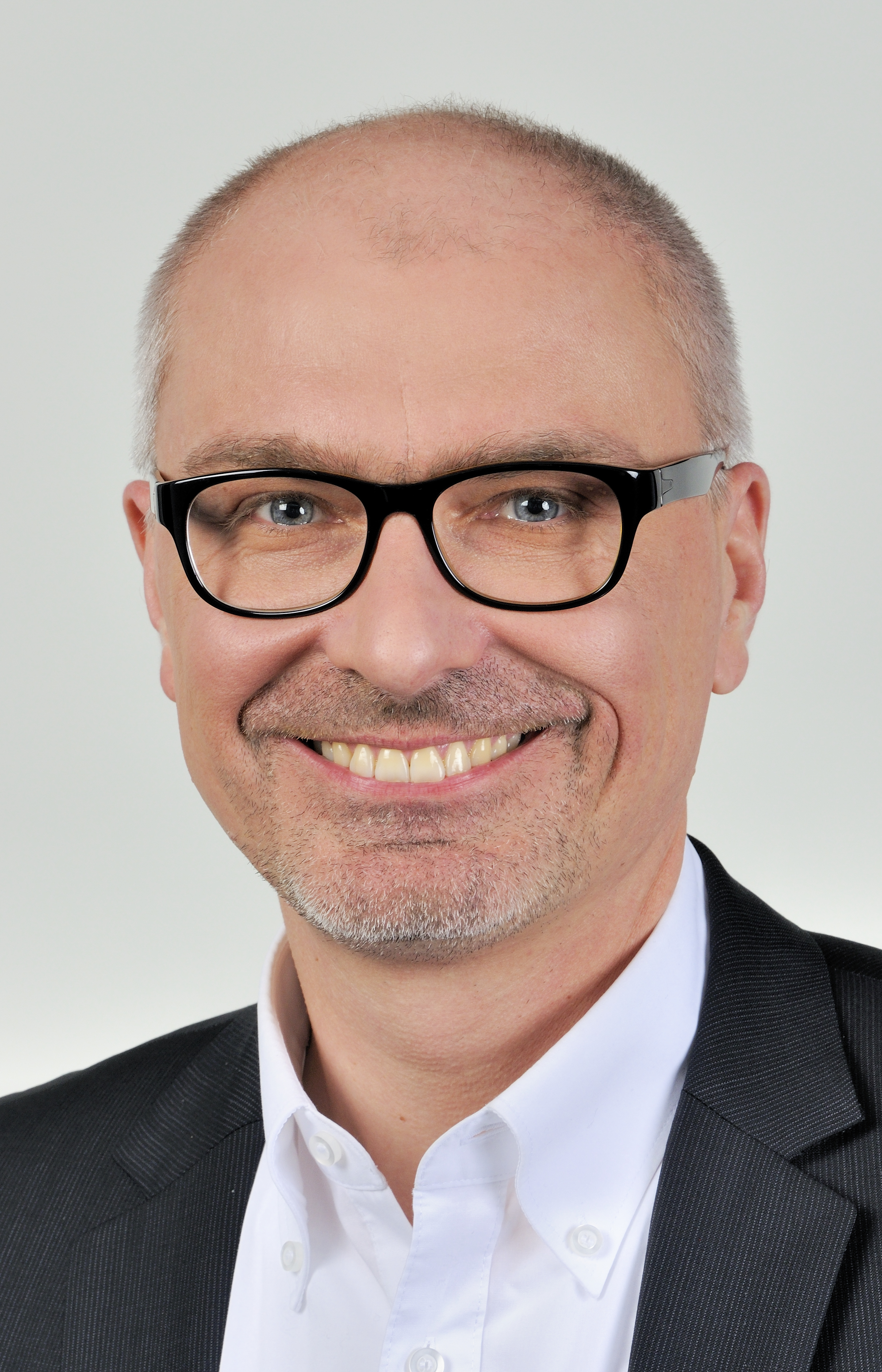

Member of the European Parliament
- Incumbent
- Assumed office 14 July 2009
- Constituency: Germany

Personal details
- Born: 4 April 1967 (age 59) Mannheim, Baden-Württemberg, West Germany
- Party: German; Social Democratic Party; European Union; Party of European Socialists

Peter Simon (born 4 April 1967) was Member of the European Parliament (MEP) representing Germany from 2009 until 2019.

== Personal background ==
After studying law at the Ruprecht-Karls-University in Heidelberg Peter Simon started as a lawyer at the Legal Affairs Office of the City of Mannheim, where he managed legal proceedings on behalf of the city administration. In 1996 he became a personal and legal advisor to First Mayor Norbert Egger, where he developed structured EU funding applications, set up and headed the working group on the introduction of the euro and carried out coordination work within the city administration. From 1999 to 2007 he established and managed the European Affairs Office of the City of Mannheim and was responsible for submission of applications for and organisation of EU-funded projects, the implementation of EU rules in the area of administration and municipal holdings, the external representation of the city administration, e.g. in the Council of European Municipalities and Regions (CEMR), German Association of Cities, Baden-Württemberg Association of Cities and drafted municipal positions on relevant EU legislative proposal. In addition, from 2000 to 2009 Peter Simon was a lecturer in European Law at the Baden-Wuerttemberg Cooperative State University. From 2001 to 2009, he was also responsible for the establishment and chairmanship of the Working Group of Coordinators for European affairs of the Baden-Wuerttemberg Association of Cities, which represents more than 50 cities. As a representative of the German municipal umbrella organizations, Peter Simon was involved 2002 and 2003 in the preparation of the draft EU Constitution in the Federal Foreign Ministry of the Federal Republic of Germany. From 2007 until his election to the European Parliament he was developing and directing promotion of business by MRN GmbH.

== Parliamentary service ==
In the 2009 European elections, Peter Simon was elected as a Member of Parliament of the SPD for Baden-Württemberg and re-elected in 2014.

From 2014 to 2019 he was Deputy Chairman of the Economic and Monetary Affairs Committee (ECON). As spokesman for the Socialist Group, he coordinated the fight against tax avoidance, tax evasion and money laundering since 2015, started in the European Parliament special committees against tax avoidance TAXE 1 and 2 (Tax Rulings and "Lux Leaks Committees") thereafter in the Committee of Inquiry into the Panama Papers (PANA) and thereafter in Special Committee against Financial Crimes, Tax Evasion and Tax Avoidance (TAX3).

Since 2014, he has also been Vice-Chair of the Intergroups "Public Services" and "URBAN" (Sustainable Urban Development).

From 2013 to 2018 Peter Simon was the shadow rapporteur and co-negotiator of the Socialist Group for the 4th and 5th AMLD (Anti-Money Laundering Directive) and from 2010 to 2014 the European Parliament's rapporteur and chief negotiator for the Deposit Guarantee Schemes Directive now in force. From 2016 to 2019, Peter Simon was the rapporteur and chief negotiator for CRD V / CRR II (Capital Requirement Directive and Capital Requirement Regulation).

Peter Simon was also a member of the European Parliament's Delegation for relations with the Palestinian Legislative Council, a deputy member of the Delegation for relations with Israel and a deputy member of the Committee on Regional Development. Until 2014, he also worked in the European Parliament delegation for relations with the Korean Peninsula.

== Overview of parliamentary posts & activities ==
- Vice-Chair of the Economic and Monetary Affairs Committee (ECON)
- Coordinator of the Socialist Group in the Special Committees of Inquiry TAXE 1 and TAXE 2 on Tax Rulings and other Measures Similar in Nature or Effect (Lux Leaks Special Committees)
- Coordinator of the Socialist Group in the PANA Committee of Inquiry on Tax Evasion, Money Laundering and Tax Avoidance (Panama Papers Committee of Inquiry)
- Coordinator of the Socialist Group in the TAX3 Special Committee of Inquiry on Financial Crimes, Tax Evasion and Tax Avoidance (Paradise Papers Special Committee)
- Vice-Chair of the Intergroups 'Public Services' and 'URBAN' (Sustainable Urban Development)
- Co-opted member of the Executive Committee of the German Association of Towns and Municipalities (DStGB)
- European Parliament rapporteur and chief negotiator on CRD V/CRR II (Capital Requirements Directive and Capital Requirements Regulation)
- European Parliament rapporteur and chief negotiator for the Deposit Guarantee Schemes Directive now in force
- Shadow rapporteur and co-chief negotiator of the Socialist Group on the 4th and 5th AMLD (Anti-Money Laundering Directives)
- European Parliament rapporteur for the report on reform of the EU state aid rules on Services of General Economic Interest
- Deputy member of the Committee on Regional Development (REGI)
- Member of the European Parliament delegation for relations with the Korean Peninsula (2009–2014)
- Member of the European Parliament delegation for relations with the Palestinian Legislative Council and deputy member of the European Parliament Delegation for relations with Israel (2014–2019)

== Publications MEP Peter Simon ==
- Social democratic magazine for municipal politics, edition 03, 2014, p. 27
- "A safety net for depositors - the view of the European Parliament" in: Zeitschrift für das gesamte Kreditwesen, edition 08/ 2011
- "EU state aid policy under examination", in: DEMO, Social democratic magazine for municipal politics, edition 11-12, 2010, p. 42-43
