= Wolf Klinz =

German politician (born 1941)

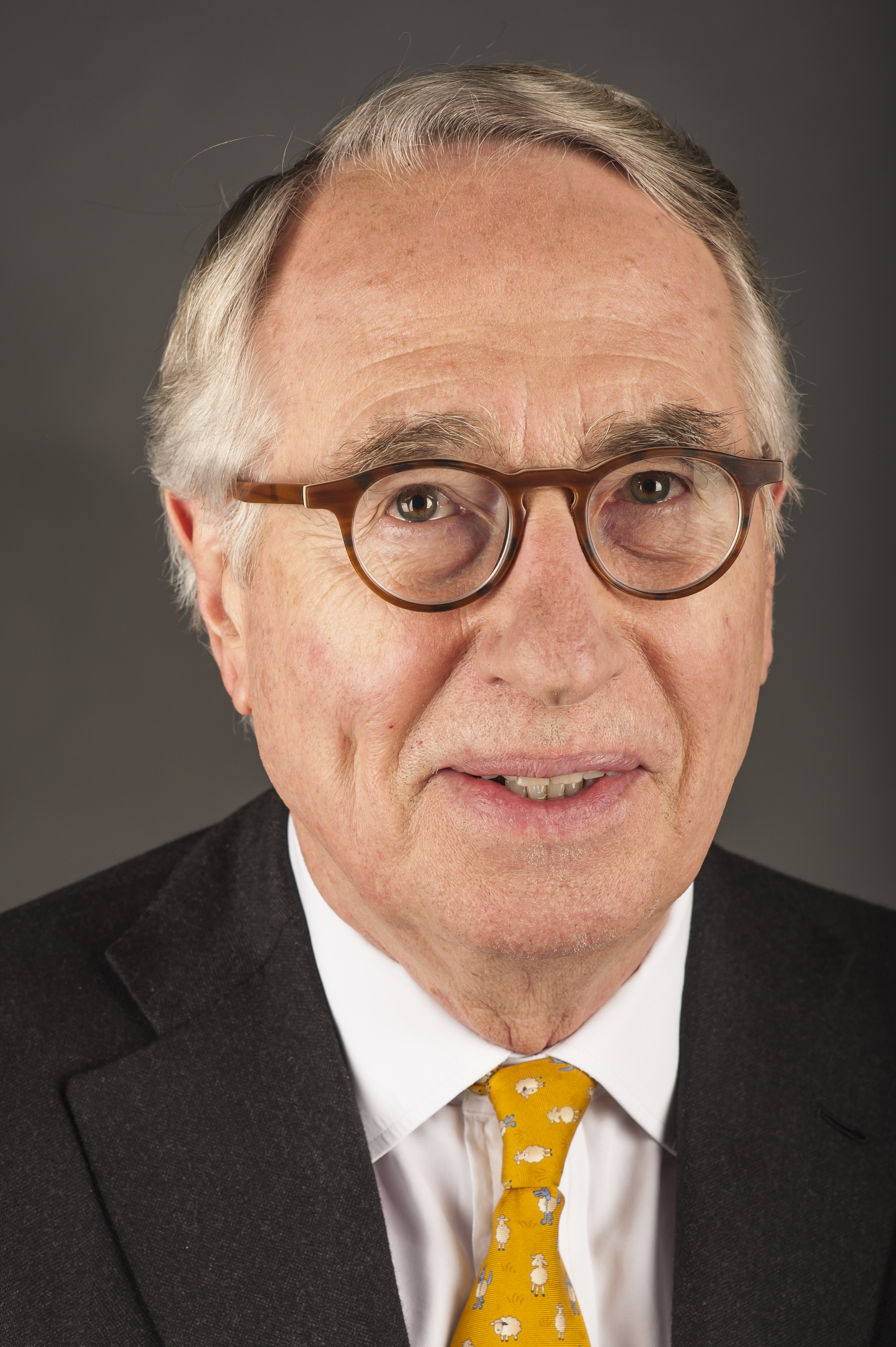

Member of the European Parliament
- In office 2004–2014
- In office 2017–2019

Personal details
- Born: 13 September 1941 (age 85) Vienna, Austria
- Party: German: Free Democratic Party; EU: Alliance of Liberals and Democrats for Europe
- Education: Vienna University of Economics and Business; INSEAD
- Profession: Consultant

Wolf Rüdiger Klinz (born 13 September 1941 in Vienna) is a German politician. He served as a Member of the European Parliament (MEP) with the Free Democratic Party of Germany (FDP), part of the Alliance of Liberals and Democrats for Europe (ALDE), from 2004 until 2014 and from 2017 until 2019.

== Early life and education ==
Born in Vienna to an Austrian mother and a German father, Klinz holds dual citizenship.

Klinz studied economics and business administration in Paris, Madrid, Berlin and Vienna. He graduated with an M.Com in 1963 from the Hochschule für Welthandel (now Vienna University of Economics and Business), a PhD in 1965, and an MBA from INSEAD, Fontainebleau, in 1966.

== Career in business ==
Klinz was a Partner with McKinsey & Company in the United Kingdom, Germany and France. Subsequently, he served as a Member of the Executive Board of a Swiss Corporation. After German reunification he joined for the Executive Board of Treuhandanstalt, the German Government's agency for privatisation of the former East German industry. He finished his business career as CEO of a large German corporation in 2003 when he decided to go into European politics.

From 2000 to 2004, Klinz held the (honorary) position of President of the Chamber of Commerce and Industry (IHK) Frankfurt am Main. From 2003 to 2004 he was the Vice-President of Eurochambres in Brussels.

== Political career ==
Klinz was Chairman of the Special Committee on the Financial, Economic and Social Crisis (CRIS), he sat on the European Parliament's Committee on Economic and Monetary Affairs (ECON) and he was a substitute for the Committee on Development (DEVE). He was the Vice-Chairman for the Delegation for relations with Canada and a member of the Delegation for relations with the countries of Southeast Asia and the Association of Southeast Asian Nations (ASEAN).

In 2009 Klinz replaced Peter Skinner as Chair of the steering committee of the European Parliamentary Financial Services Forum, a platform "promoting effective dialogue between the financial industry and MEPs and contributing to a greater understanding of financial services issues".

In 2015, the European Commission asked Klinz to chair the board of the European Financial Reporting Advisory Group (EFRAG), which was set up in 2001 as a private association to advise the Commission on accounting standards and other aspects of financial reporting. Klinz did not take up this position in May 2015 due to ill health; Jean-Paul Gauzes was appointed instead.

In November 2017, Klinz again became a Member of the European Parliament, after his party colleague Michael Theurer had been elected to the Bundestag in the German elections. He served on the Committee on Economic and Monetary Affairs. In this capacity, he was his parliamentary group's rapporteur on location of the seat of the European Banking Authority (EBA) in 2018.

== Other activities ==
=== Corporate boards ===
- AVECO AG, Member of the Supervisory Board
- IVG Immobilien, Member of the Advisory Board
- Deutsche Real Estate AG, Member of the Supervisory Board (2001-2002)
- Zumtobel Group, Member of the Supervisory Board (2002–2010)

=== Non-profit organizations ===
- Hessian Broadcasting Corporation (HR), Member of the Broadcasting Council (2002–2004)
- Transparency Germany, Member of the Advisory Board (until 2001)

== Recognition ==
Klinz received the Johann Wolfgang von Goethe Medal of the University Frankfurt am Main and the Medal of Honour of the IHK Frankfurt am Main. He received the Grand Decoration of Honour in Silver for Services to the Republic of Austria in 2005. In 2009 he received the Cross of the Order of Merit of the Federal Republic of Germany. On 1 September 2020 Dr. Wolf Klinz was appointed as an Honorary Professor of European Policy and International Management of the Ukrainian-American Concordia University (UACU).

== Personal life ==
Klinz lives in Berlin.
