= Preslav Borissov =

Bulgarian politician

Preslav Borissov MEP
- In office 1 January 2013 – 30 June 2014

Personal details
- Born: 7 March 1977 (age 49) Sofia
- Party: GERB

Preslav Borissov (Bulgarian: Преслав Борисов) (born 7 March 1977 in Sofia) is a Bulgarian politician who served as a Member of the European Parliament (MEP) for the GERB between 2013 and 2014. He took the seat of Iliana Ivanova on 1 January 2013 after she resigned to join the European Court of Auditors.
