= Chrysoula Saatsoglou-Paliadeli =

Greek archaeologist (born 1947)

Chrysoula Saatsoglou-Paliadeli (Greek: Χρυσούλα Σαατσόγλου- Παλιαδέλη; born 8 July 1947) is a Greek archaeologist, professor emerita of Aristotle University of Thessaloniki and former member of the European Parliament.

Saatsoglou-Paliadeli was born in Thessaloniki on 8 July 1947. She studied in Thessaloniki and then worked as assistant to archaeologists George Despinis and Manolis Andronikos.

She has been involved with excavations at Dion and in particular at Vergina where she was director of the University of Thessaloniki's excavations.

She was a member of the 7th European Parliament representing Greece, from 2009 to 2014, as a member of the Panhellenic Socialist Movement (PASOK). In 2014 she was selected as a candidate for the election of the deputy governor of Thessaloniki.

== Selected publications ==
- Drougou, Stella; Saatsoglou-Paliadelē, Chrysoula (2004). Vergina:wandering through the archaeological site. Athens: Archaeological Receipts Fund. ISBN 9789602142417.
- Drougou, Stella; Saatsoglou-Paliadelē, Chrysoula (2006). Vergina : the land and its history. Athens: Militos. ISBN 9789608912113.
- Naskou-Perrakī, Paroula; Chiou-Maniatopoulou, Theodōra; Saatsoglou-Paliadelī, Chrysoula (2010). The protection of women's rights in the European Union. Athens Bruxelles: Sakkoulas. ISBN 9789601523279.
- Livierátos, Evángelos (2012). European Cartography and Politics: The Case of Macedonia: From the 25 Centuries of European Cultural Tradition to the Century of Transformation, with a contribution by Chrysoula Paliadeli. Thessaloniki: Ziti Publications. ISBN 978-960-456-372-2.
