= Mitro Repo =

Finnish Orthodox Christian priest

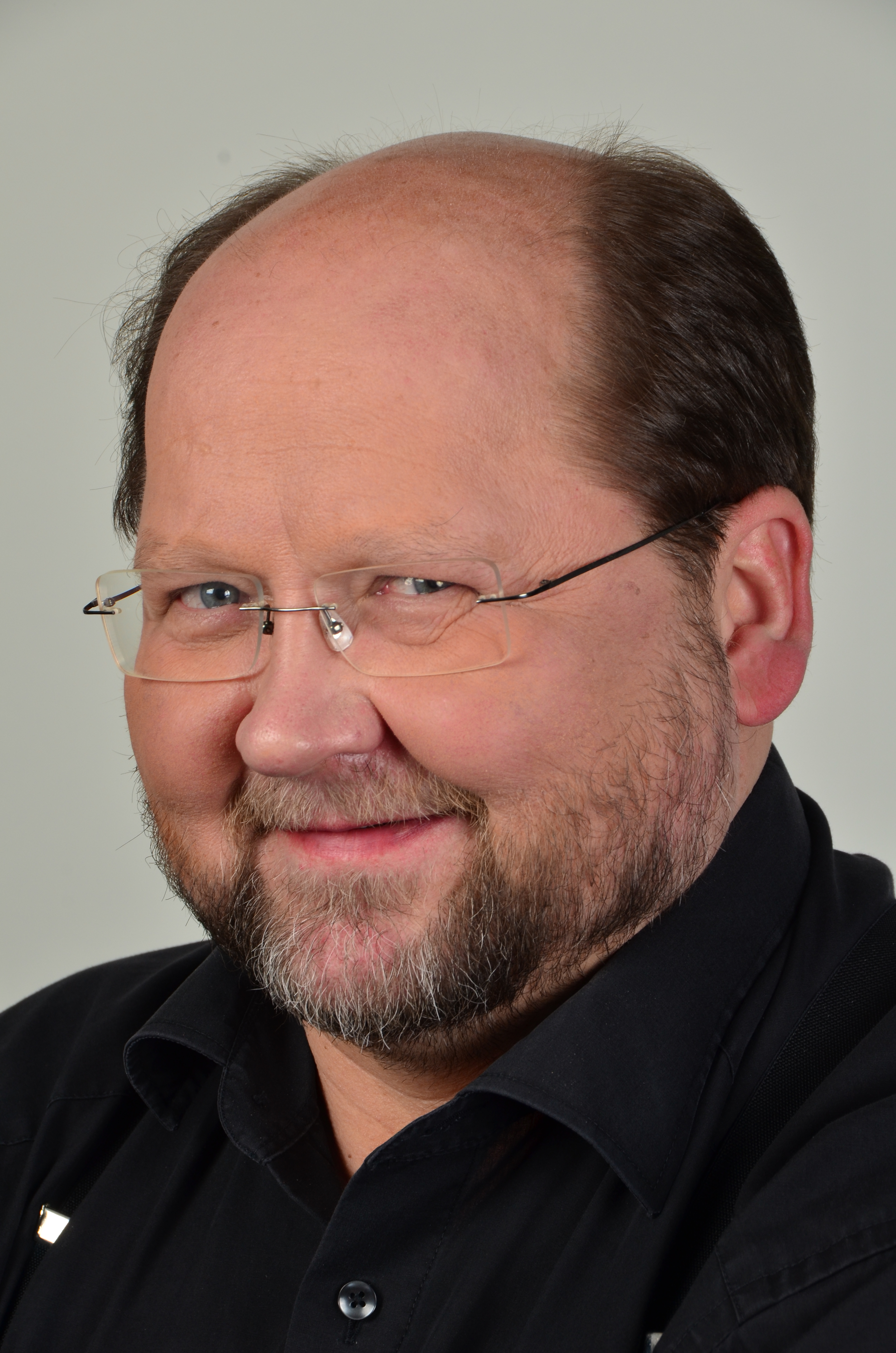
Mitro Repo in February 2014

Mitro Repo (born September 3, 1958) is a Finnish Orthodox Christian priest. He was member of the European Parliament from 2009 until 2014, elected as an independent candidate on the Social Democratic Party's ticket. He ran also in the 2014 election but received less than 9,000 votes compared to over 70,000 in the 2009 election, and was not re-elected.

Repo is a third generation priest. He studied theology at the University of Helsinki.

Repo's position on the Finnish Church's involvement in splitting the Estonian Orthodox Church led him into a conflict with metropolitan Johannes in the 1990s.

Repo has been a popular speaker and commentator in radio and television talk shows. In addition to his church services, he has visited workers in their factories and financial and business leaders.

Repo was asked by several parties to run as a candidate in European Parliament elections, and he finally chose the Social Democrats. His decision to stand in the election led to a conflict between Repo and the church leadership. In the end, the Finnish Orthodox Church banned him from serving in religious services and wearing his trademark priestly outfit.

His candidacy and election to the EU Parliament in 2009 aroused some interest in the international press, e.g., in Le Monde and in The New York Times.

During his term in the European Parliament, Mitro Repo served in the committee for culture and education and the committee for the internal market and consumer protection.
