= 2018 EPP President of the European Commission primaries =

Selection of the EPP lead candidate for the 2019 European elections

2018 European People's Party presidential primary
- 8 November 2018

619 valid votes cast by eligible congress delegates
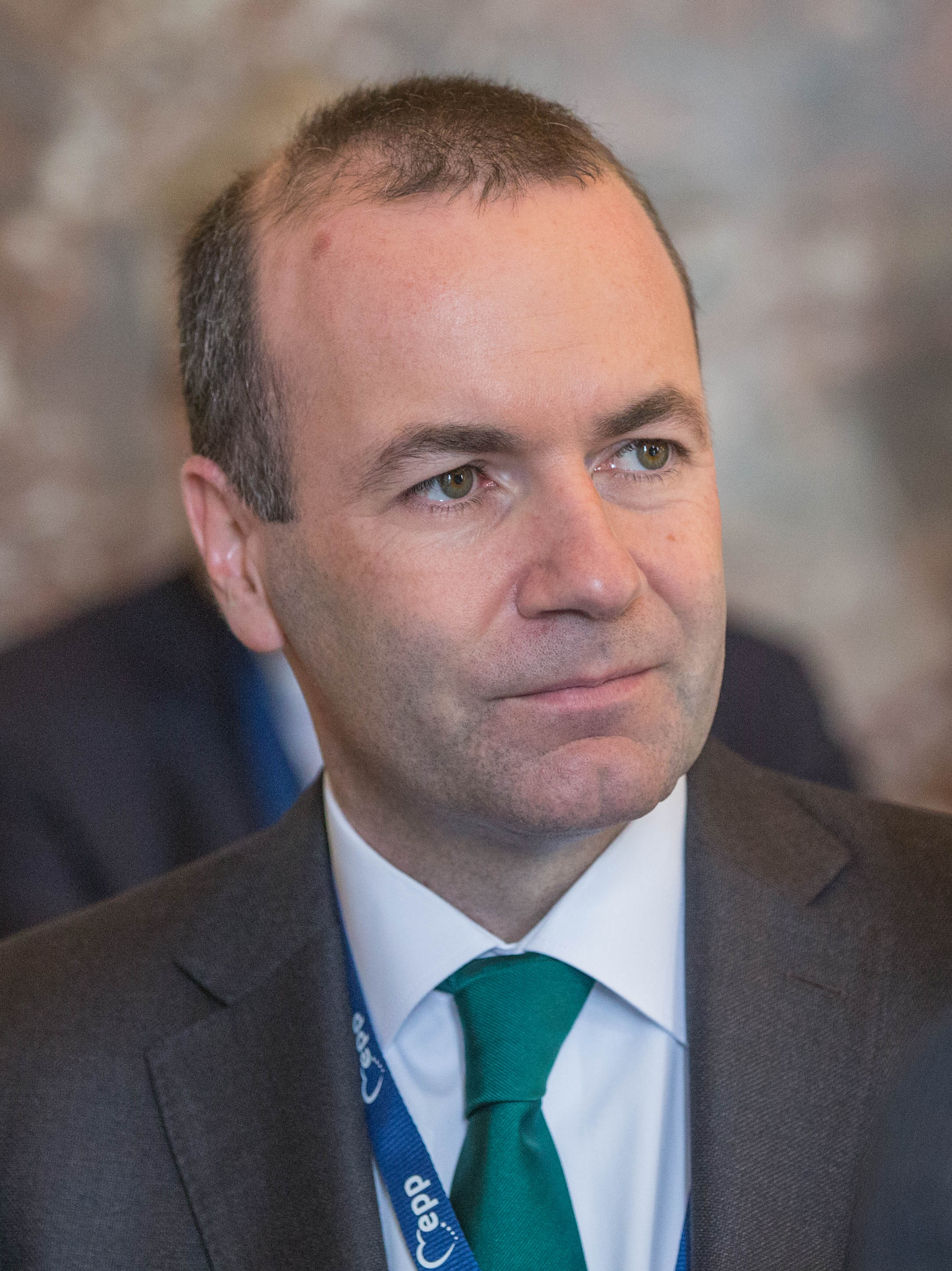

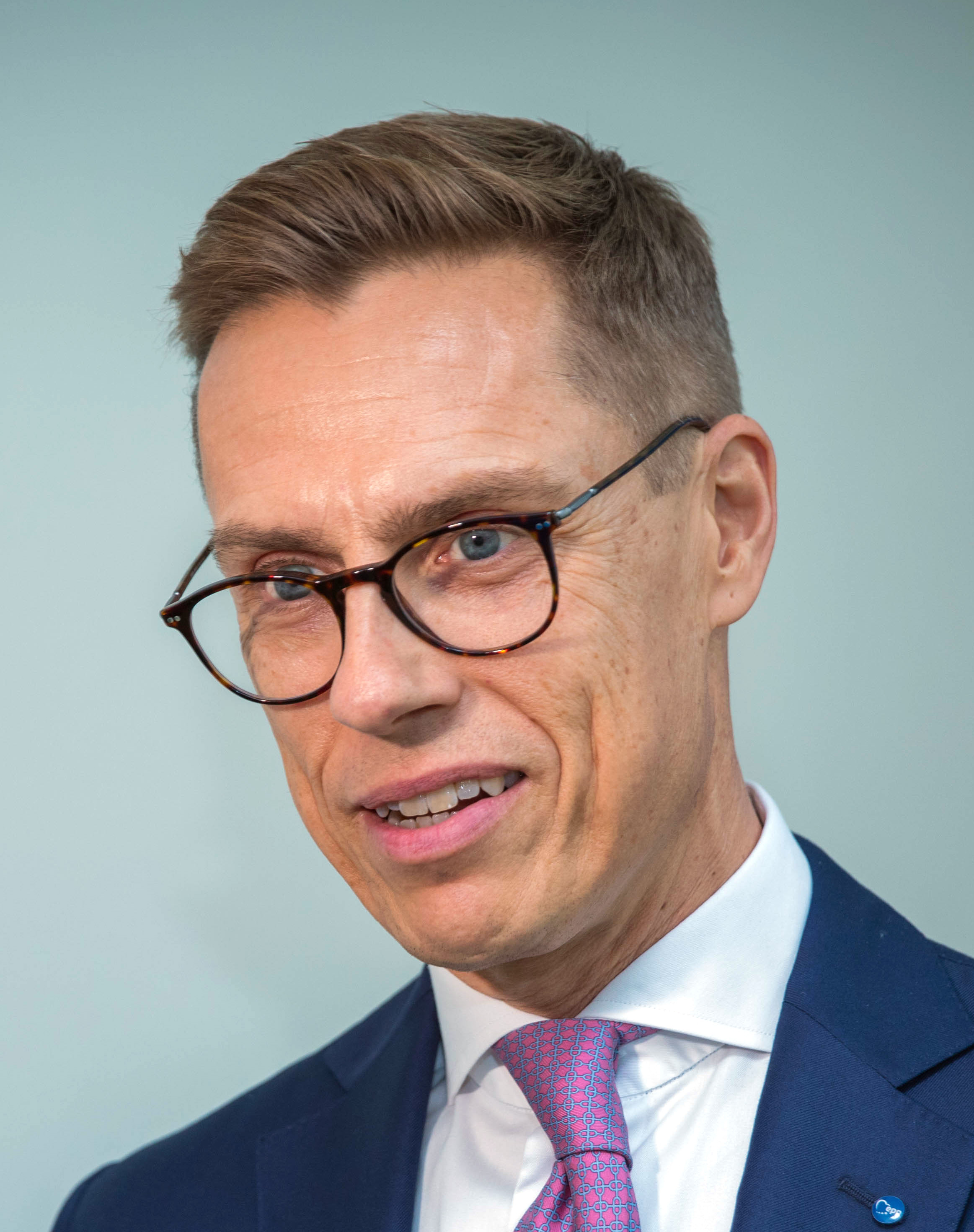
Candidate	Manfred Weber	Alexander Stubb
Party	Christian Social Union	National Coalition Party
Popular vote	492	127
Percentage	79.5%	20.5%
Previous EPP lead candidate
Jean-Claude Juncker
CSV
EPP lead candidate
Manfred Weber
CSU

The 2018 European People's Party presidential primary was held on 8 November 2018 to select the European People's Party's (EPP) lead candidate, or Spitzenkandidat, for President of the European Commission ahead of the 2019 European Parliament election. The ballot took place at the party's congress in Helsinki, Finland. Manfred Weber, the German leader of the EPP Group in the European Parliament, defeated former Finnish prime minister Alexander Stubb by 492 votes to 127.

The contest was the second time that the EPP chose a lead candidate through a competitive congress ballot, following the selection of Jean-Claude Juncker for the 2014 European Parliament election. Although the EPP remained the largest group after the 2019 election, Weber was not nominated for the Commission presidency. The European Council instead nominated Ursula von der Leyen, who was elected by the European Parliament in July 2019.

== Background ==
Under Article 17(7) of the Treaty on European Union, the European Council proposes a candidate for President of the European Commission, taking account of the elections to the European Parliament, and the Parliament then elects the nominee. In the Spitzenkandidat process, European political parties designate lead candidates before the parliamentary election and argue that the candidate of the party able to command a parliamentary majority should head the Commission. The process had first produced a Commission president in 2014, when the EPP's Jean-Claude Juncker was nominated by the European Council and elected by Parliament.

The EPP opened its selection process in advance of its congress in Helsinki on 7 and 8 November 2018. A prospective candidate required the support of their own EPP member party and of member parties from at least two other countries. Nominations closed on 17 October, leaving Weber and Stubb as the only candidates. The EPP described the congress as part of its preparations for the 2019 elections and said that around 2,000 participants from more than 40 countries had been invited.

== Candidates ==
=== Manfred Weber ===
Weber announced his candidacy on 5 September 2018. At the time, he had led the EPP Group in the European Parliament since 2014 and had served as a member of the Parliament since 2004. He presented the election as a choice about defending the European model against challenges from outside the Union and from Eurosceptic forces within it, while calling for greater public involvement in European decision-making. Weber was supported by his party, the German Christian Social Union, as well as the Dutch Christian Democratic Appeal and the Greek New Democracy. He entered the congress as the favourite and had the backing of German chancellor Angela Merkel.

=== Alexander Stubb ===
Stubb announced his candidacy on 2 October 2018. A former prime minister, finance minister, foreign minister and member of the European Parliament, he was then a vice-president of the European Investment Bank. He took five weeks' unpaid leave from the bank to campaign. Stubb's candidacy was endorsed by Finland's National Coalition Party, Sweden's Moderate Party and Estonia's Isamaa.

Stubb campaigned as a strongly pro-European, liberal member of the centre-right. He emphasised the defence of the rule of law and European values, including in disputes involving EPP member party Fidesz. He also highlighted his national executive experience and ability to campaign in several languages.

== Endorsements ==
The EPP's nomination rules required each candidate to be supported by their own member party and by member parties from at least two other countries. The parties that formally supported the nominations were:

Candidate	Home party	Supporting member parties
Manfred Weber	(Germany) Christian Social Union	(Netherlands) Christian Democratic Appeal; (Greece) New Democracy
Alexander Stubb	(Finland) National Coalition Party	(Sweden) Moderate Party; (Estonia) Isamaa

In addition to the nominating parties, the following public endorsements were reported during the contest:

=== Manfred Weber ===
Individuals

- Angela Merkel, Chancellor of Germany and leader of the Christian Democratic Union
- Sebastian Kurz, Chancellor of Austria and chairman of the Austrian People's Party
- (Italy) Antonio Tajani, President of the European Parliament and vice-president of Forza Italia
- (France) Laurent Wauquiez, president of The Republicans
- Viktor Orbán, Prime Minister of Hungary and president of Fidesz

Organisations

- Christian Democrats, an EPP member party which backed Weber despite the congress being hosted in Finland and Stubb being the candidate of another Finnish EPP party

== Campaign ==
The campaign lasted approximately five weeks. Weber's larger national delegation and support among senior EPP figures made him the front-runner, while Stubb described himself as the underdog. Both candidates advocated continued European integration, but Stubb placed greater emphasis on liberal values and a firm response to democratic backsliding. He described himself as a moderate liberal within the centre-right and Weber as a conservative.

Weber and Stubb took part in their first and only debate at the Helsinki congress on 7 November. Stubb later characterised the event as a "nice fireside chat" and said that he would have preferred a longer primary campaign with debates across the European Union. The vote among eligible congress delegates was held by secret ballot the following day.

== Results ==
Weber won 492 of the 619 valid votes, or 79.5 per cent, while Stubb received 127 votes, or 20.5 per cent.

2019 EPP presidential primary result
Candidate	National party	Votes	Percentage
Manfred Weber	Christian Social Union	492	79.5%
Alexander Stubb	National Coalition Party	127	20.5%
Valid votes		619	100.0%

EPP president Joseph Daul congratulated Weber and praised both candidates, describing the Spitzenkandidat process as a means of making European Union politics more visible and democratic. Weber subsequently led the EPP campaign for the May 2019 European Parliament election.

== Aftermath ==
The EPP remained the largest political group in the European Parliament after the 2019 election, but lost seats and did not obtain a majority. Weber's claim to the Commission presidency was opposed by several members of the European Council, while the Council had previously maintained that it was not automatically bound to nominate a party's lead candidate.

After negotiations over the European Union's senior offices, the European Council proposed German defence minister Ursula von der Leyen, an EPP politician who had not been a lead candidate in the European election. The Council announced the nomination on 2 July 2019. On 16 July, the European Parliament elected von der Leyen by 383 votes to 327, with 22 abstentions and one invalid vote. Because neither Weber nor any other party's lead candidate became Commission president, the outcome was regarded as a failure of the Spitzenkandidat process in that election. The Commission presidency nevertheless remained with the EPP.

== See also ==
- 2019 European Parliament election
- Spitzenkandidat
- 2019 European People's Party leadership election
