= Arnaud Danjean =

French politician (born 1971)

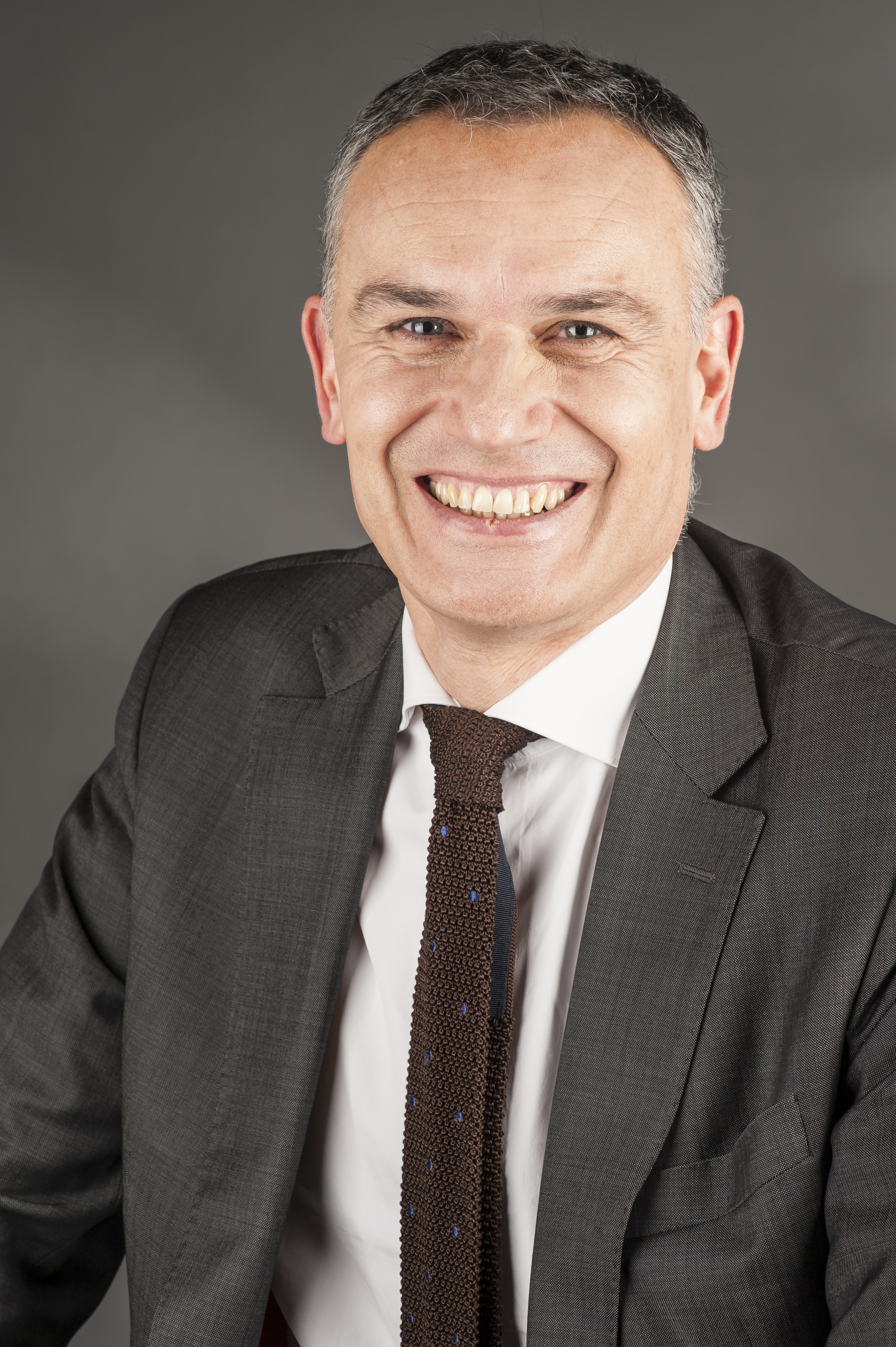
- Danjean in 2014

Member of the European Parliament
- In office 14 July 2009 – 15 July 2024
- Constituency: East France (2009–2019); France (2019–2024)

Personal details
- Born: 11 February 1971 (age 55) Louhans, France
- Party: Rally for the Republic (1991–2002); Union for a Popular Movement (2002–2015); The Republicans (2015–present)
- Education: Sciences Po

Arnaud Danjean (French pronunciation: [aʁno dɑ̃ʒɑ̃]; born 11 February 1971) is a French politician and former civil servant who served as a Member of the European Parliament (MEP) from 2009 to 2024. A member of The Republicans (LR), he was also elected a member of the Regional Council of Burgundy in 2010. He was elected to the newly-created Regional Council of Bourgogne-Franche-Comté in 2015, holding a seat until his resignation in 2017.

In the European Parliament, Danjean represented France's East constituency until 2019, when he was reelected for a third term in the newly-reestablished nationwide constituency. He chaired the European Parliament Subcommittee on Security and Defence (SEDE) from 2009 to 2014, a subcommittee of the European Parliament Committee on Foreign Affairs (AFET). As member of LR, Danjean was a member of the European People's Party Group (EPP Group).

In 2024, Danjean was appointed a special adviser to Prime Minister Michel Barnier.

== Early life and education ==
Danjean graduated in 1992 from Sciences Po with a degree in communication, research and human resource, and completed his curriculum in 1993 with a postgraduate diploma in political science and international relations at Sciences Po.

== Professional career ==
=== At the Ministry of Defence ===
After completing his military service as a reserve officer at the submarine base of Toulon, Danjean passed an examination to join the French DGSE as a civil servant. He carried out numerous missions in Sarajevo in 1995 and 1996, especially during the Siege of Sarajevo and the signature of the Dayton Agreement. He became a permanent member of the French Embassy in Sarajevo from June 1996 to September 1998.

Danjean later worked as a Balkans specialist for the Ministry of Defence and took part to the negotiations of the Rambouillet Agreement in February and March 1999.

After June 1999, Danjean carried out short-term missions in the Balkans and Central European countries.

=== At the Ministry of Foreign Affairs ===
Danjean joined the Mission of France to the United Nations in Geneva in 2002, and performed in 2004 a new mission in Kosovo for Javier Solana, High Representative for Common Foreign and Security Policy (CFSP).

In 2005, Danjean joined the staff of Minister of Foreign Affairs Michel Barnier where he was in charge of the Balkans and Afghanistan. He remained in office from July 2005 to March 2007 under the tenure of Barnier's successor Philippe Douste-Blazy.

== Political career ==
=== Early beginnings ===
Danjean stood for election at the 2007 legislative election in the Bresse region against the incumbent Socialist Arnaud Montebourg in the 6th constituency of the Saône-et-Loire department. He was defeated by less than 400 second-round votes after leading the first round with 44% of the vote against 41.3% for Montebourg.

He spent an extended stay in the United States at the end of 2007 in the framework of a German Marshall Fund course.

=== Member of the European Parliament, 2009–2024 ===
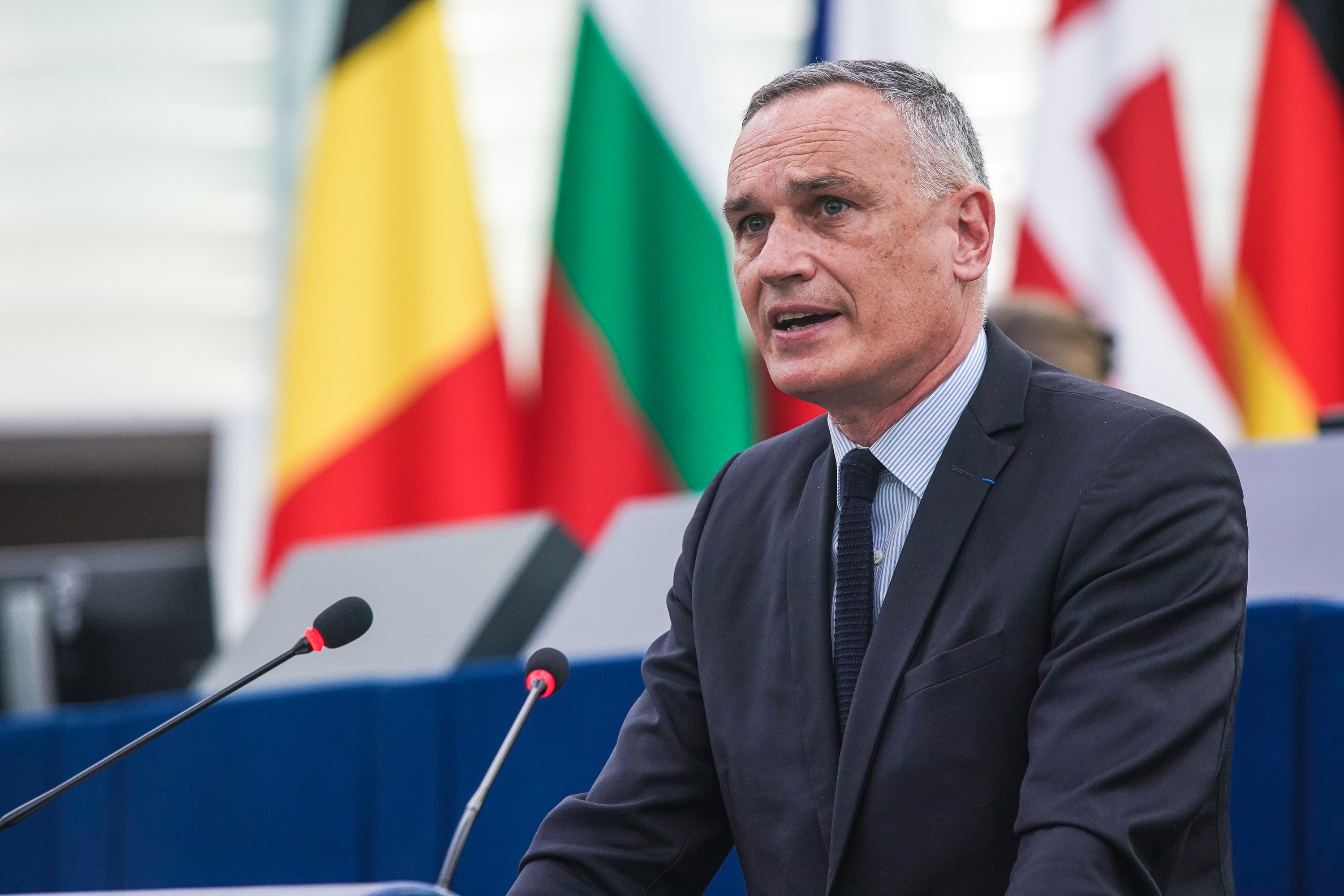
Danjean speaking in the European Parliament in 2022

Danjain first became a Member of the European Parliament in 2009 for the East France constituency on the list headed by Joseph Daul. He was elected as chairman of the European Parliament Subcommittee on Security and Defence (SEDE), a subcommittee of the European Parliament Committee on Foreign Affairs (AFET). Following the 2019 European Parliament election, he also joined the Committee on International Trade (INTA).

In addition, Danjean served as a member of the European Parliament's Sky and Space Intergroup (SSI). In 2010, he joined the "Friends of the EEAS", an unofficial and independent pressure group formed because of concerns that the High Representative of the Union for Foreign Affairs and Security Policy Catherine Ashton was not paying sufficient attention to the Parliament and was sharing too little information on the formation of the European External Action Service. From 2014 until 2019, he was part of the delegation for relations with the NATO Parliamentary Assembly.

As part of his parliamentary work, Danjean carried out several missions, in particular in Georgia and Uganda. He was the rapporteur for the European Parliament's 2010 resolution on the Implementation of the European Security Strategy and the Common Security and Defence Policy.

Following the 2019 elections, Danjean was part of a cross-party working group in charge of drafting the European Parliament's four-year work programme on foreign policy.

Within the centre-right European People's Party Group (EPP), Danjean was from then on a member of the leadership team around chairman Manfred Weber.

=== Role in French national politics ===
Danjean was elected a member of the Regional Council of Burgundy in 2010 and its successor, the Regional Council of Bourgogne-Franche-Comté, in 2015. He resigned his seat on 1 June 2017. A candidate at the 2012 legislative election in the newly-redrawn 4th constituency of Saône-et-Loire against Socialist Cécile Untermaier, who was supported by Arnaud Montebourg, he was defeated again by less than 400 second-round votes, gathering 49.6% of the total vote.

In September 2024, he was appointed a special adviser to newly-appointed Prime Minister Michel Barnier.

== Political positions ==
Danjean is widely considered an Atlanticist and proponent of NATO.

He welcomed François Hollande's decision to engage the French Armed Forces in response to the armed groups' offensive in Northern Mali on 11 January 2013, an action he called "inevitable, justified and legitimate" according to the circumstances and international law. He however regretted the inertia of the European Union despite a vote on a strategy for Sahel as soon as 2011, and criticised the inability of the French Government to involve other European countries which he sees as a consequence of the precipitate withdrawal of French troops from Afghanistan.

In 2015, Danjean warned fellow French conservatives against being soft on Russia, arguing that "through the fascination for Putin, there is a real philosophical and ideological pull-back, namely a rejection of political liberalism."

In The Republicans' 2016 presidential primaries, Danjean endorsed Alain Juppé as the party's candidate for the office of President of France. Ahead of the 2022 presidential election, he publicly declared his support for Michel Barnier as The Republicans' candidate.

== Recognition ==
- 2000 – Ordre national du Mérite

== Other activities ==
- European Council on Foreign Relations (ECFR), Member of the Council

== Publications ==
He commented in 2007 the Declaration of European Muslims of Mustafa Cerić, Rais of Bosnia and Herzegovina.

He published in January 2013 an article in the Revue défense nationale: "Entre tentation du repli et fatalisme du déclin : l'Europe face à ses responsabilités" (Between the temptation of retreat and the fatalism of decline: Europe facing its responsibilities).

== Decorations ==
- Decorated Chevalier de l'Ordre national du Mérite in May 2000 (decoration awarded by the President of the Republic, Jacques Chirac, and pinned in December 2000 by the Minister of Defence Alain Richard).
