= Saône-et-Loire's 4th constituency =

French legislative constituency

4th constituency of Saône-et-Loire
- inline Constituency of the National Assembly of France

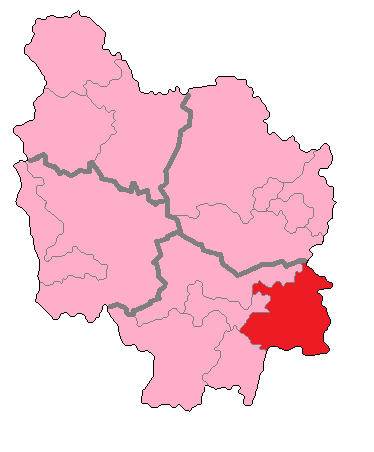
- Saône-et-Loire's 4th Constituency shown within Burgundy
- Deputy: Éric Michoux; LR (UXD)
- Department: Saône-et-Loire
- Cantons: Beaurepaire-en-Bresse, Chalon-sur-Saône-Nord, Cuiseaux, Cuisery, Louhans, Montpont-en-Bresse, Montret, Pierre-de-Bresse, Saint-Germain-du-Bois, Saint-Germain-du-Plain, Saint-Martin-en-Bresse, Sennecey-le-Grand, Tournus
- Registered voters: 81,128

The 4th constituency of the Saône-et-Loire is a French legislative constituency in the Saône-et-Loire département.

== Description ==
The 4th constituency of the Saône-et-Loire covers the north of Chalon-sur-Saône and the eastern part of the department. Following substantial boundary changes prior to the 2012 election the seat is now entirely different in character from its predecessor.

The seat has historically been a bastion of the Socialist Party, though the new boundaries made it far more marginal and the PS candidate won by only 379 at the 2012 election. In the 2017 election it was one of the few constituencies held by the PS, in this case by over 2,000 votes. PS strengthened their hold on the seat in 2022, winning by over 4,000 votes.

== Historic Representation ==
Election	Member	Party
1986	Proportional representation – no election by constituency	
1988	Pierre Joxe	PS
1988	Didier Mathus	PS
1993	Didier Mathus	PS
1997	Didier Mathus	PS
2002	Didier Mathus	PS
2007	Didier Mathus	PS
2012	Cécile Untermaier	PS
2017	Cécile Untermaier	PS
2022	Cécile Untermaier	PS
2024	Éric Michoux	LR (UXD)

== Election results ==
=== 2024 ===
Legislative Election 2024: Saône-et-Loire's 4th constituency
Party	Candidate	Votes	%	±%
DLF	Véronique Bellest	728	1.33	−0.39
LR	Anthony Vadot	12,222	22.33	N/A
LR (UXD)	Eric Michoux	24,275	44.34	+19.19
LO	Claude Couratier	1,115	2.04	−0.05
PS (NFP)	Cécile Untermaïer	16,403	29.96	−4.01
Turnout		54,743	96.67	+48.83
Registered electors		82,625		
2nd round result
LR	Eric Michoux	29,272	54.66	+10.96
PS	Cécile Untermaier	24,283	45.34	−10.96
Turnout		53,555	93.30	+48.17
Registered electors		82,638		
LR gain from PS				

=== 2022 ===
Legislative Election 2022: Saône-et-Loire's 4th constituency
Party	Candidate	Votes	%	±%
PS (NUPÉS)	Cécile Untermaier	13,144	33.97	+4.32
RN	Valérie Deloge	9,733	25.15	+8.59
HOR (Ensemble)	Elisabeth Roblot	7,893	20.40	−2.74
LC (UDC)	Eric Michoux	4,952	12.80	−3.05
REC	Jean Raffa	1,500	3.88	N/A
LO	Claude Couratier	809	2.09	+1.49
DLF (RPR)	Nathalie Szych	666	1.72	+0.21
Turnout		38,697	47.84	−0.17
2nd round result
PS (NUPÉS)	Cécile Untermaier	19,421	56.30	+1.63
RN	Valérie Deloge	15,072	43.70	N/A
Turnout		34,493	45.73	+9.02
PS hold				

=== 2017 ===
Legislative Election 2017: Saône-et-Loire's 4th constituency
Party	Candidate	Votes	%	±%
LREM	Catherine Gabrelle	9,544	24.14	
PS	Cécile Untermaier	7,171	18.14	
FN	Maxime Thiébaut	6,544	16.56	
LR	Stéphane Gros	6,265	15.85	
DVD	Eric Michoux	4,084	10.33	
LFI	Michèle Chambon	3,297	8.34	
Others	N/A	2,623		
Turnout		39,528	48.01	
2nd round result
PS	Cécile Untermaier	16,527	54.67	
LREM	Catherine Gabrelle	13,701	45.33	
Turnout		30,228	36.71	
PS hold				

=== 2012 ===
Legislative Election 2012: Saône-et-Loire's 4th constituency
Party	Candidate	Votes	%	±%
PS	Cécile Untermaier	18,179	37.78	
UMP	Arnaud Danjean	15,179	31.55	
FN	Alain Quequin	7,011	14.57	
DVD	Eric Michoux	3,704	7.70	
FG	Isabelle Pirat	2,048	4.26	
EELV	Marie-Claude Colin-Cordier	1,058	2.20	
Others	N/A	935		
Turnout		48,114	59.29	
2nd round result
PS	Cécile Untermaier	23,810	50.40	
UMP	Arnaud Danjean	23,431	49.60	
Turnout		47,241	58.23	
PS hold				

=== 2007 ===
Legislative Election 2007: Saône-et-Loire's 4th constituency
Party	Candidate	Votes	%	±%
UMP	Marie-Claude Jarrot	16,066	42.95	
PS	Didier Mathus	15,042	40.21	
FN	Christian Launay	1,447	3.87	
MoDem	Fabrice Prudhon	1,332	3.56	
PCF	Christian Tramoy	1,248	3.34	
LCR	Marine Lautrou	813	2.17	
LV	Jane-Paul Bonin	808	2.16	
EXG	Pascal Dussauge	341	0.91	
MPF	Daniel Bouffange	311	0.83	
DIV	Isabelle Girodet	0	0.00	
Turnout		38,028	61.49	
2nd round result
PS	Didier Mathus	20,629	51.23	
UMP	Marie-Claude Jarrot	19,635	48.77	
Turnout		41,229	66.67	
PS hold				

=== 2002 ===
Legislative Election 2002: Saône-et-Loire's 4th constituency
Party	Candidate	Votes	%	±%
PS	Didier Mathus	15,492	41.48	
DVD	Antoine André	10,392	27.82	
FN	Christian Launay	4,107	11.00	
UMP	Diane Cheze	2,778	7.44	
PCF	Maurice Gagnard	1,831	4.90	
DLC	Eliane Regnault	849	2.27	
LO	Pascal Dussauge	748	2.00	
CPNT	Michel Raymond	706	1.89	
MNR	Michel Rudowski	341	0.91	
DIV	Jacques Canaan	106	0.28	
Turnout		38,385	62.61	
2nd round result
PS	Didier Mathus	18,199	51.61	
DVD	Antoine André	17,061	48.39	
Turnout		36,570	59.66	
PS hold				

=== 1997 ===
Legislative Election 1997: Saône-et-Loire's 4th constituency
Party	Candidate	Votes	%	±%
PS	Didier Mathus	16,843	42.53	
RPR	Pierre Corneloup	7,368	18.61	
PRV (UDF)	Jean Girardon	4,421	11.16	
RN	Patrick Szczepanski	4,168	10.53	
PCF	André Mathivet	3,514	8.87	
LV	Jean-Paul Bonin	1,058	2.67	
LO	Marie-Thérèse Deroche	1,015	2.56	
LDI	René Labarge	801	2.02	
DVE	Salvatore Jurado	412	1.04	
Turnout		42,031	67.98	
2nd round result
PS	Didier Mathus	24,837	61.52	
RPR	Pierre Corneloup	15,538	38.48	
Turnout		42,853	69.32	
PS hold				

== Sources ==
Official results of French elections from 2002: "Résultats électoraux officiels en France" (in French).
