= 2022 European People's Party leadership election =

Election for the presidency of the European People's Party

2022 European People's Party presidential election
- 31 May 2022

502 votes cast
Candidate	Manfred Weber
Party	CSU
Popular vote	447
Percentage	89.0%
President before election
Donald Tusk
PO
Elected President
Manfred Weber
CSU

The 2022 European People's Party presidential election was held on 31 May 2022 at the European People's Party's (EPP) congress in Rotterdam, the Netherlands. Manfred Weber of the German Christian Social Union in Bavaria (CSU) was elected president with 447 of the 502 votes cast, or 89.0 per cent. He succeeded former President of the European Council Donald Tusk.

== Background ==
The EPP president heads the party's presidency, its executive body, and presides over the EPP Political Assembly. The party presidency is elected every three years by the EPP Congress.

Tusk, who had led the EPP since 2019, left the office after returning to Polish domestic politics to lead Civic Platform, the country's largest opposition party at the time. Weber had chaired the EPP Group in the European Parliament since 2014. His election as party president created a dual leadership role, as he remained chair of the parliamentary group after the congress.

The election took place during the EPP's 27th Congress, held at Rotterdam Ahoy on 31 May and 1 June 2022 and co-hosted by the Dutch Christian Democratic Appeal (CDA). The party entered the congress after electoral setbacks among some of its leading member parties. Germany's CDU/CSU alliance had recorded its worst federal-election result since the Second World War in 2021, while the EPP-affiliated French centre-right had performed poorly in the 2022 presidential election.

== Election ==
In his remarks surrounding the congress, Weber presented the EPP as a unifying force between the political left and the far right. He said that the party needed to rebuild voters' trust, respond to the economic effects of the Russian invasion of Ukraine, and oppose populist movements seeking to weaken European cooperation. In a statement after the vote, he said the EPP would seek to unite European societies and rejected both populist polarisation and a top-down approach to European politics.

=== Results ===
The EPP reported that Weber received 447 votes out of 502 cast. Published results did not provide a separate breakdown of the remaining 55 votes.

2022 EPP presidential election result
Candidate	National party	Votes	%
Manfred Weber	CSU (Germany)	447	89.0
Total votes cast		502	100.0
Source: European People's Party

== Aftermath ==
Weber succeeded Tusk as EPP president while continuing as chair of the EPP Group in the European Parliament. The congress also elected ten vice-presidents and treasurer Paulo Rangel. At Weber's proposal, the delegates elected Thanasis Bakolas as secretary-general.

Weber was re-elected to a second three-year term at the party's congress in Valencia on 29 April 2025, receiving 502 of 563 valid votes.

== See also ==
- European People's Party
- Manfred Weber
