= East France (European Parliament constituency) =

Former European Parliament constituency

- European Parliament constituency
- Location among the 2014 constituencies

- Shown within France
- Member state: France
- Created: 2004
- MEPs: 10

For elections in the European Union until 2014, and for European Parliament until 2019, East France was a European Parliament constituency. It consisted of the regions of Grand Est and Bourgogne-Franche-Comté.

== Members of the European Parliament ==
| Election | MEP (party) | MEP (party) | MEP (party) | MEP (party) | MEP (party) | MEP (party) | MEP (party) | MEP (party) | MEP (party) | MEP (party) |
|---|---|---|---|---|---|---|---|---|---|---|
| 2004 | Catherine Trautmann (PS) | Catherine Boursier (PS) | Benoît Hamon (PS) | Pierre Pribetich (PS) | Marie-Anne Isler-Béguin (Greens) | Jean Marie Beaupuy (UDF) | Natalie Griesbeck (UDF) | Joseph Daul (UMP) | Véronique Mathieu (UMP) | Bruno Gollnisch (FN) |
| 2009 | Catherine Trautmann (PS) | Liêm Hoang-Ngoc (PS) | Michèle Striffler (LGM) | 9 seats | Sandrine Bélier (EELV) | Nathalie Griesbeck (MoDem) | Arnaud Danjean (UMP /LR) | Joseph Daul (UMP) | Véronique Mathieu (UMP) | Bruno Gollnisch (FN) |
| 2014 | Édouard Martin (PS) | Florian Philippot (FN/ The Patriots) | Sophie Montel (FN/ The Patriots) | 9 seats | Jean-François Jalkh (FN) | Nathalie Griesbeck (MoDem) | Arnaud Danjean (UMP /LR) | Nadine Morano (UMP /LR) | Anne Sander (UMP /LR) | Dominique Bilde-Pierron (FN) |
| 2015 | Édouard Martin (PS) | Florian Philippot (FN/ The Patriots) | Sophie Montel (FN/ The Patriots) | 9 seats | Jean-François Jalkh (FN) | Nathalie Griesbeck (MoDem) | Arnaud Danjean (UMP /LR) | Nadine Morano (UMP /LR) | Anne Sander (UMP /LR) | Dominique Bilde-Pierron (FN) |
| 2017 | Édouard Martin (PS) | Florian Philippot (FN/ The Patriots) | Sophie Montel (FN/ The Patriots) | 9 seats | Jean-François Jalkh (FN) | Nathalie Griesbeck (MoDem) | Arnaud Danjean (UMP /LR) | Nadine Morano (UMP /LR) | Anne Sander (UMP /LR) | Dominique Bilde-Pierron (FN) |

== Results ==
=== 2009 ===
European Election 2009: East
| List | Candidates | Votes | Of total (%) | ± from prev. |
|---|---|---|---|---|
| UMP | Joseph Daul Véronique Mathieu Arnaud Danjean Michèle Striffler | 635,016 | 29.18 | |
| PS | Catherine Trautmann Liêm Hoang Ngoc | 374,971 | 17.24 | |
| EELV | Sandrine Bélier | 310,620 | 14.27 | |
| MoDem | Jean-François Kahn | 205,256 | 9.43 | |
| FN | Bruno Gollnisch | 164,672 | 7.57 | |
| NPA | None | 122,767 | 5.65 | |
| AEI | None | 92,613 | 4.26 | |
| Libertas | None | 89,127 | 4.10 | |
| FG | None | 84,632 | 3.89 | |
| DLR | None | 50,698 | 2.34 | |
| LO | None | 31,848 | 1.46 | |
| Liberal Alternative | None | 5,721 | 0.26 | |
| Eŭropo Demokratio Esperanto | None | 4,325 | 0.20 | |
| Europe décroissance | None | 941 | 0.05 | |
| AR | None | 749 | 0.04 | |
| Newropeans | None | 307 | 0.02 | |
| Communists | None | 198 | 0.01 | |
| Humanist Party | None | 82 | 0.00 | |
| Turnout | | 2,289,221 | 39.10 | |

=== 2004 ===
Brackets indicate the number of votes per seat won.

European Election 2004: East
| List | Candidates | Votes | Of total (%) | ± from prev. |
|---|---|---|---|---|
| PS | Pierre Moscovici Catherine Trautmann Adeline Hazan Benoît Hamon | 631,989 (157,997.25) | 28.41 | |
| UMP | Joseph Daul Véronique Mathieu | 391,929 (195,964.5) | 17.62 | |
| UDF | Natalie Griesbeck Jean-Marie Beaupuy | 275,932 (137,966) | 12.40 | |
| FN | Bruno Gollnisch | 270,852 | 12.17 | |
| LV | Marie-Anne Isler-Beguin | 142,196 | 6.39 | |
| MPF | None | 130,921 | 5.88 | |
| PCF | None | 64,804 | 2.91 | |
| MEI | None | 61,457 | 2.76 | |
| Far left | None | 54,424 | 2.45 | |
| Automobiliste vache à lait | None | 52,376 | 2.35 | |
| RPF | None | 44,260 | 1.99 | |
| La France d'en bas | None | 40,031 | 1.80 | |
| Rassemblement des Contribuables Français | None | 21,546 | 0.97 | |
| Workers' Party | None | 18,436 | 0.83 | |
| MNR | None | 13,890 | 0.62 | |
| Eŭropo Demokratio Esperanto | None | 5,341 | 0.24 | |
| Vivre mieux avec l'Europe | None | 3,480 | 0.16 | |
| AR | None | 499 | 0.02 | |
| Parti Fédéraliste | None | 417 | 0.02 | |
| Parti des Socioprofessionnels | None | 96 | 0.00 | |
| Turnout | | 2,224,876 | 40.87 | |
