= 2025 European People's Party leadership election =

Election for the presidency of the European People's Party

2025 European People's Party presidential election
- 29 April 2025

563 valid votes
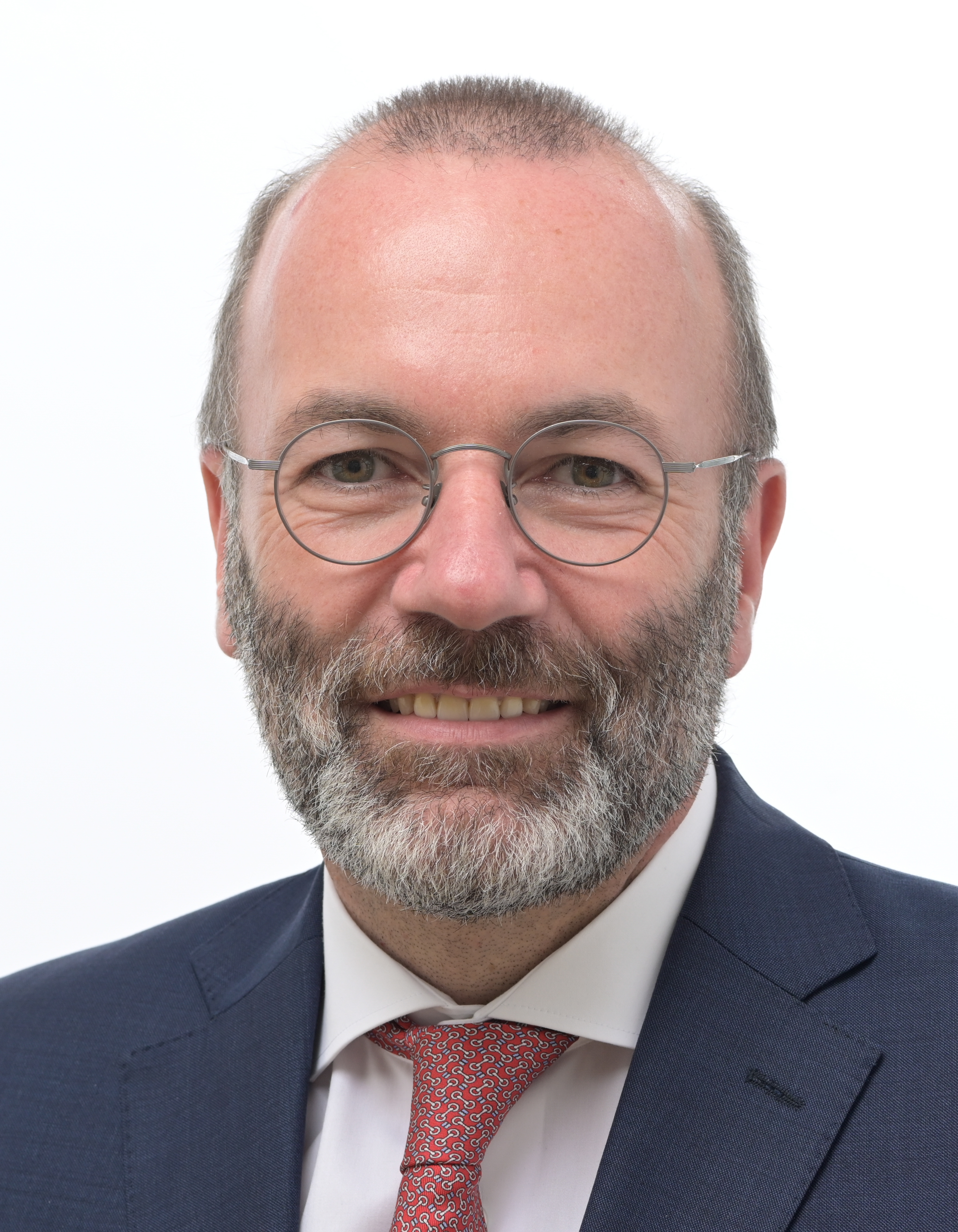
Candidate	Manfred Weber
Party	CSU
Popular vote	502
Percentage	89.2%
President before election
Manfred Weber
CSU
Elected President
Manfred Weber
CSU

The 2025 European People's Party presidential election was held on 29 April 2025 during the European People's Party's (EPP) congress in Valencia, Spain. Incumbent president Manfred Weber of the German Christian Social Union in Bavaria (CSU), the sole candidate, was re-elected for a second three-year term. He received 502 of the 563 valid votes, or 89.2 per cent.

== Background ==
Weber had first been elected EPP president at the party's congress in Rotterdam on 31 May 2022, succeeding Donald Tusk. He continued simultaneously as chair of the EPP Group in the European Parliament.

The party entered the 2025 congress after remaining the largest political group in the 2024 European Parliament election. In the weeks before the congress, Weber described the EPP as an anchor of stability and linked his bid for another term to the party's electoral record since 2022. He said the party had won 18 elections at European or national level during his first term and was represented by 14 members of the European Commission.

Weber's political strategy had also generated internal unease. According to El País, EPP members from countries where mainstream parties maintained a strict cordon sanitaire against the far right had expressed concern about occasions on which the EPP Group voted with the European Conservatives and Reformists Group and Patriots for Europe. Weber said that the party's central challenge was to oppose populists and autocrats across Europe.

== Congress ==
The election formed part of the EPP's 29th Congress, held in Valencia on 29 and 30 April 2025 and co-hosted by Spain's People's Party (PP). The meeting was expected to bring together at least eight European Union prime ministers as well as the presidents of the European Commission and the European Parliament.

Preparations were affected by the Iberian Peninsula power outage on 28 April. The congress was also held amid continuing controversy over the Valencian regional government's response to the 2024 Spanish floods, which had led the Spanish PP to consider moving the event away from Valencia. The EPP leadership declined to relocate it, citing the costs involved.

Weber campaigned on a programme of strengthening European defence and developing a new centre-right political platform. In his congress speech, he called for a common European defence architecture and argued that the EPP needed to combine policy delivery with hope and political enthusiasm in order to compete with populist and extremist parties.

== Results ==
Weber was the sole candidate for the party presidency. The EPP announced that he had received 502 votes from 563 valid ballots. The party's published result did not provide a separate breakdown of the other 61 valid votes.

2025 EPP presidential election result
Candidate	National party	Votes	%
Manfred Weber	CSU (Germany)	502	89.2
Total valid votes		563	100.0
Source: European People's Party

== Other leadership elections ==
On 30 April, the congress elected the remaining members of the EPP presidency. At Weber's proposal, Spanish MEP and former health minister Dolors Montserrat was elected as first secretary-general of the party with 518 votes out of 558 valid votes, succeeding Thanasis Bakolas. François-Xavier Bellamy of The Republicans was elected treasurer.

The ten elected vice-presidents, listed by the number of votes received, were Petteri Orpo, Antonio Tajani, David McAllister, Siegfried Mureșan, Andrzej Halicki, Dubravka Šuica, Magnus Brunner, Kostis Hatzidakis, Mairead McGuinness and Paulo Rangel.

== See also ==
- European People's Party
- Manfred Weber
- 2024 European Parliament election
