= Pierre Pribetich =

French politician

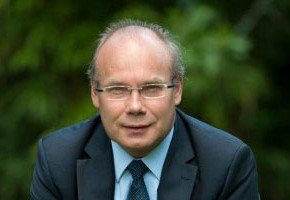
- Pierre Pribetich in 2013

Member of the European Parliament
- In office 4 July 2007 – 13 July 2009
- Preceded by: Pierre Moscovici
- Constituency: East France

Personal details
- Born: 28 December 1956 (age 69) Roubaix, Nord, France
- Party: Socialist Party
- Occupation: Politician

Pierre Pribetich is a French politician, who, from 2007 until 2009, was a Member of the European Parliament representing East France for the Socialist Party. He was appointed following the resignation of Pierre Moscovici.

== Parliamentary service ==
- Member, Committee on Regional Development (2007-2009)
- Member, Delegation for relations with the countries of Southeast Asia and the Association of Southeast Asian Nations (ASEAN) (2007-2009)
- Member, Subcommittee on Security and Defence (2009)
- Member, Committee on Foreign Affairs
