= 2019 European People's Party leadership election =

Election for the presidency of the European People's Party

- 20 November 2019

528 votes cast
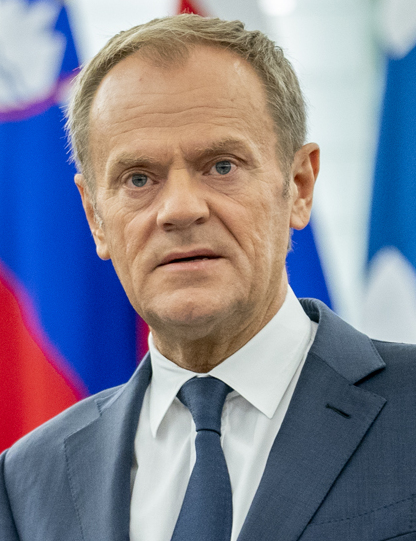
| Candidate | Donald Tusk |
| Party | PO |
| Popular vote | 491 |
| Percentage | 93.0% |
President before election
Joseph Daul
LR
Elected President
Donald Tusk
PO

The 2019 European People's Party leadership election was held on 20 November 2019 during the European People's Party's (EPP) congress in Zagreb, Croatia. Donald Tusk of Poland's Civic Platform was elected unopposed as president of the party, receiving 491 votes in favour and 37 against, or 93 per cent of the votes cast. He succeeded retiring president Joseph Daul, and his term began on 1 December 2019.

== Background ==
Daul, a former French member of the European Parliament, had led the EPP since 2013 and was retiring after two terms as president. Tusk had served as Prime Minister of Poland from 2007 to 2014 and as President of the European Council from 2014. His second term at the European Council was due to expire on 30 November 2019, one day before the beginning of his EPP presidency.

The EPP had remained the largest political group in the European Parliament following the 2019 European Parliament election, continuing a position it had held after every European election since 1999. Civic Platform, the party Tusk had founded and previously led, was one of its member parties.

A central internal issue was the status of the Hungarian governing party Fidesz, whose EPP membership had been suspended in March 2019 over concerns relating to the rule of law, civil society and the independence of the media. Tusk had publicly criticised democratic backsliding in Hungary, and his prospective election was seen as potentially leading to a confrontation with Fidesz leader and Hungarian prime minister Viktor Orbán.

== Candidacy ==
In early November, Tusk announced that he would not stand in the 2020 Polish presidential election, prompting expectations that he would take another senior European role. Before nominations closed on 13 November, he was the only publicly known prospective candidate to succeed Daul. By the time of the congress, Tusk was the sole candidate for the EPP presidency.

The party congress took place in Zagreb on 20 and 21 November. Alongside the leadership election, delegates discussed the European Union's enlargement process, climate policy and the unresolved dispute over Fidesz's membership.

== Platform ==
Tusk presented his candidacy as a defence of Christian-democratic and liberal-democratic values against populist and authoritarian movements. He argued that public safety, border protection and effective government were compatible with civil liberties, democracy and the rule of law. He also said that parties unwilling to accept those principles placed themselves outside the EPP political family.

His remarks were widely interpreted as referring to Fidesz. The future of the Hungarian party's membership was expected to be one of the first major questions facing the new EPP president.

== Results ==
Delegates approved Tusk's candidacy by 491 votes to 37. The EPP reported the result as 93 per cent in favour.

2019 EPP presidential election result
| Option | Votes | % |
|---|---|---|
| In favour of Donald Tusk | 491 | 93.0 |
| Against | 37 | 7.0 |
| Total | 528 | 100.0 |
Source: European People's Party

== Aftermath ==
Tusk formally took office on 1 December 2019, after completing his term as president of the European Council. He led the EPP until 2022. After returning to Polish domestic politics as leader of Civic Platform, he was succeeded by Manfred Weber at the EPP congress in Rotterdam on 31 May 2022.

== See also ==
- European People's Party
- Donald Tusk
- 2019 European Parliament election
