= Liêm Hoang-Ngoc =

French economist and politician (born 1964)

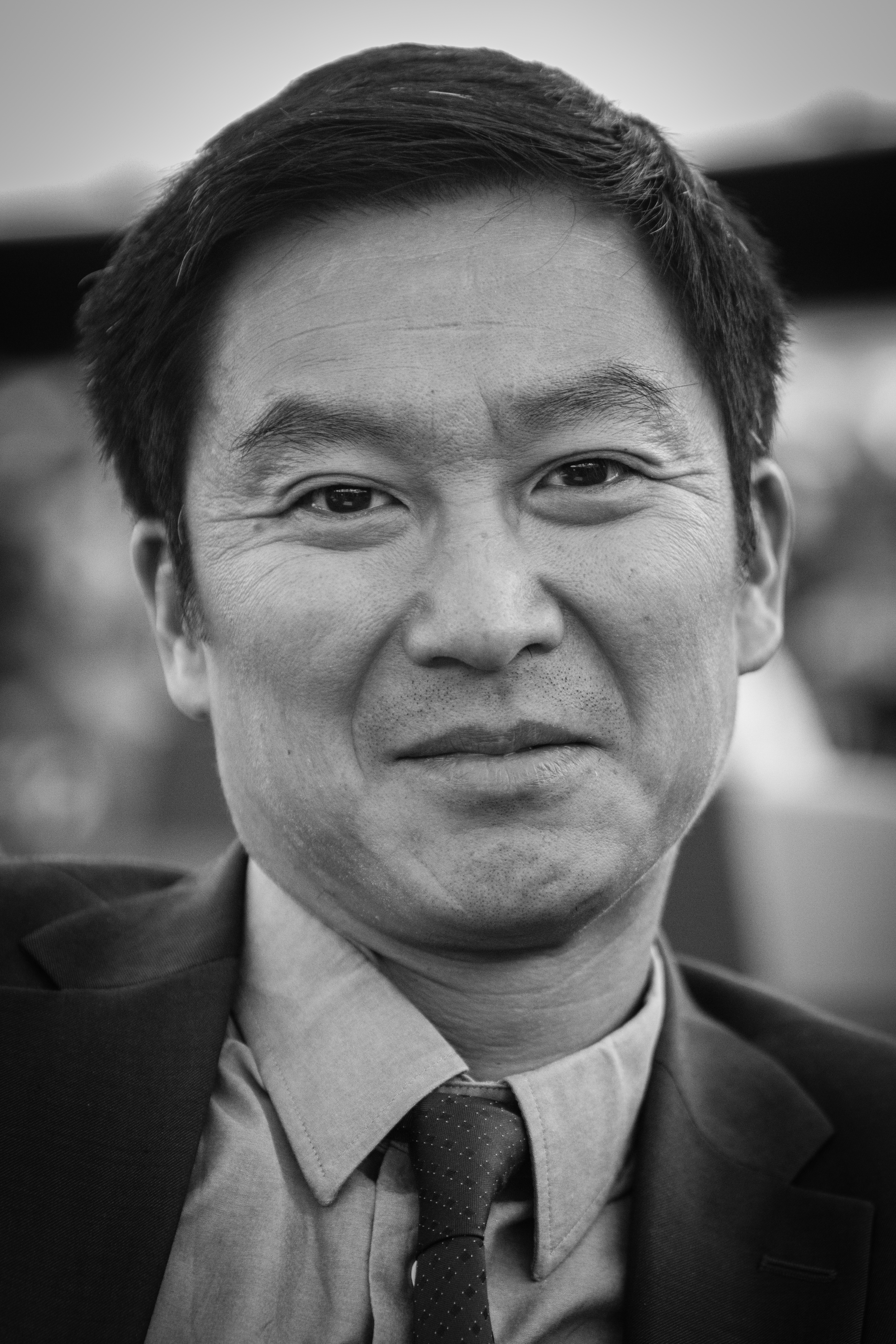
- Hoang-Ngoc in 2013

Member of the European Parliament
- In office 2009–2014
- Constituency: East France

Personal details
- Born: 11 December 1964 (age 61) Saigon, Vietnam
- Party: Socialist Party; La France Insoumise
- Education: University of Picardy; Pantheon-Sorbonne University

Liêm Hoang-Ngoc (French pronunciation: [ljɛm ɔɑ̃ŋ ɡɔk]; born 11 December 1964 in Saigon, South Vietnam) is a Vietnamese-born French economist and Member of the European Parliament elected in the 2009 European election for the East France constituency as a member of the French Socialist Party. During his time as a Socialist, he was known to sympathise with the left of the party, and was close to Henri Emmanuelli. He is also a member of the alter-globalization collective Attac.

On 16 June 2015, he left the Socialist Party to found a new movement, the "New Socialist Left", calling for unity within the broad left of the left of the Socialist Party, the Green Party, and the Left Front to counter what he sees as the supply-side economics of the current Socialist government.

Hoang-Ngoc is an associate professor at the University of Paris 1 Pantheon-Sorbonne.

In the 2009 European elections, he was placed second on the Socialist list for the East region. He was a candidate in the 2017 French legislative election, in the 4th district of Haute-Garonne, as a member of La France Insoumise. He gained 21% of the vote in the first round, but lost the second round to Mickaël Nogal of LREM. Liêm Hoang Ngoc who joined the political movement La France Insoumise then in early July 2018, suspended his relationship with this group for which he co-authored the economical programme.
