= Mickaël Nogal =

French politician

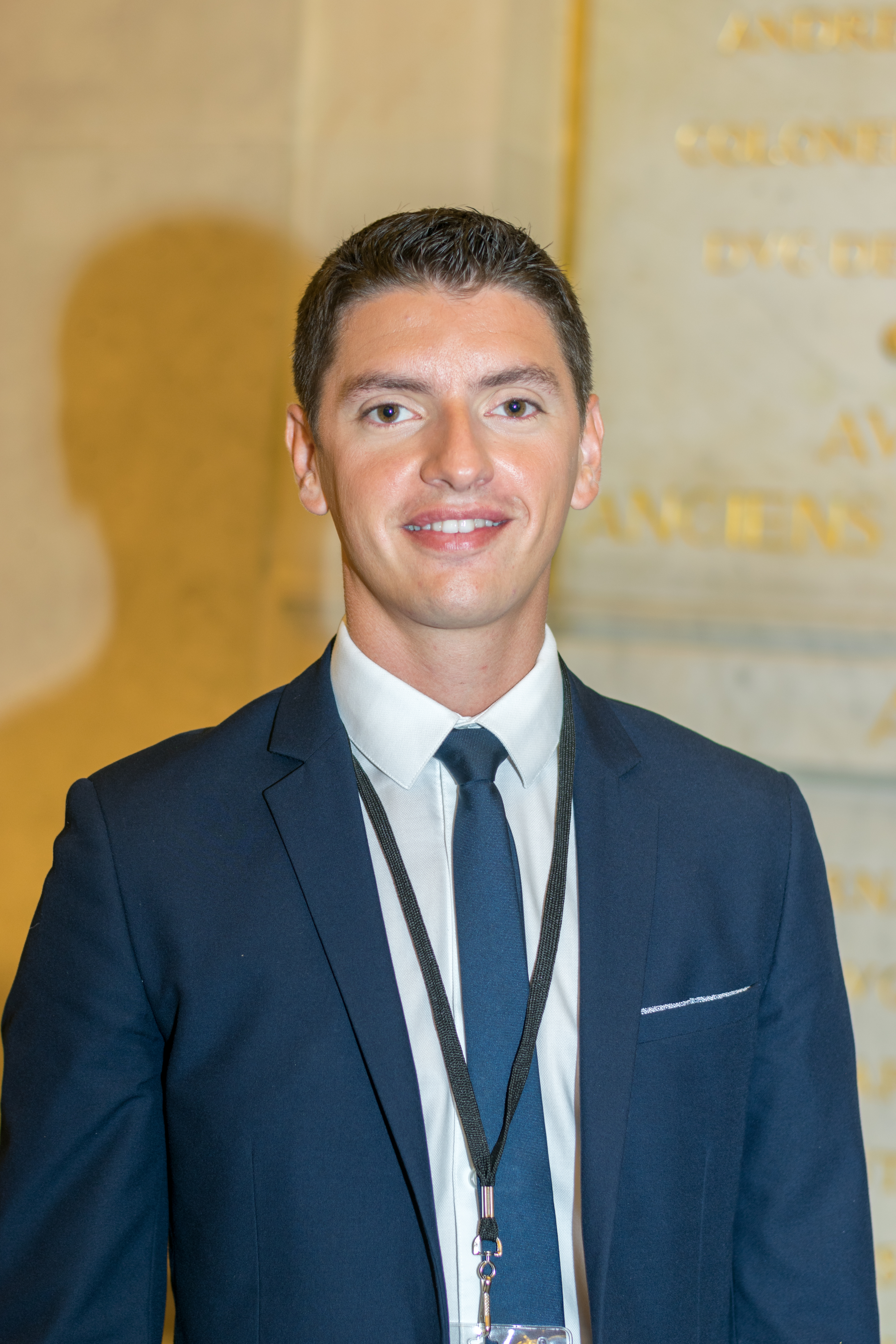

Member of the French National Assembly for Haute-Garonne's 4th constituency
- In office 21 June 2017 – 19 June 2022
- Preceded by: Martine Martinel
- Succeeded by: François Piquemal

Personal details
- Born: 26 November 1990 (age 35) Toulouse, France
- Party: La République En Marche!

Mickaël Nogal (born 26 November 1990) is a French politician of La République En Marche! (LREM) who served as a member of the French National Assembly from 2017 to 2022, representing Haute-Garonne's 4th constituency.

== Political career ==
Nogal defeated Liêm Hoang-Ngoc of La France Insoumise to win his seat in the 2017 election.

In parliament, Nogal served as member of the Committee on European Affairs. In addition to his committee assignments, he was part of the parliamentary friendship groups with Colombia, Spain and Venezuela.

In December 2018, Nogal was appointed by Prime Minister Édouard Philippe to a conduct 6-month parliamentary mission – in support of ministers Jacqueline Gourault and Julien Denormandie – on the role of estate agencies, with the mandate to "simplify the rental of housing and improve relations between landlords and tenants."

In July 2019, Nogal voted in favor of the French ratification of the European Union’s Comprehensive Economic and Trade Agreement (CETA) with Canada.

In March 2020, LREM group chairman Gilles Le Gendre appointed Nogal and Michèle Peyron as the parliamentary majority's rapporteurs on economic and health emergency measures amid the COVID-19 pandemic in France.

In January 2022, Nogal was appointed director general of the National Association of Food Industries (ANIA). He did not seek re-election at the 2022 parliamentary election.

In 2025, Nogal was appointed special adviser to Minister of Finance Éric Lombard.

== See also ==
- 2017 French legislative election
