= François Piquemal =

French politician and teacher (born 1984)

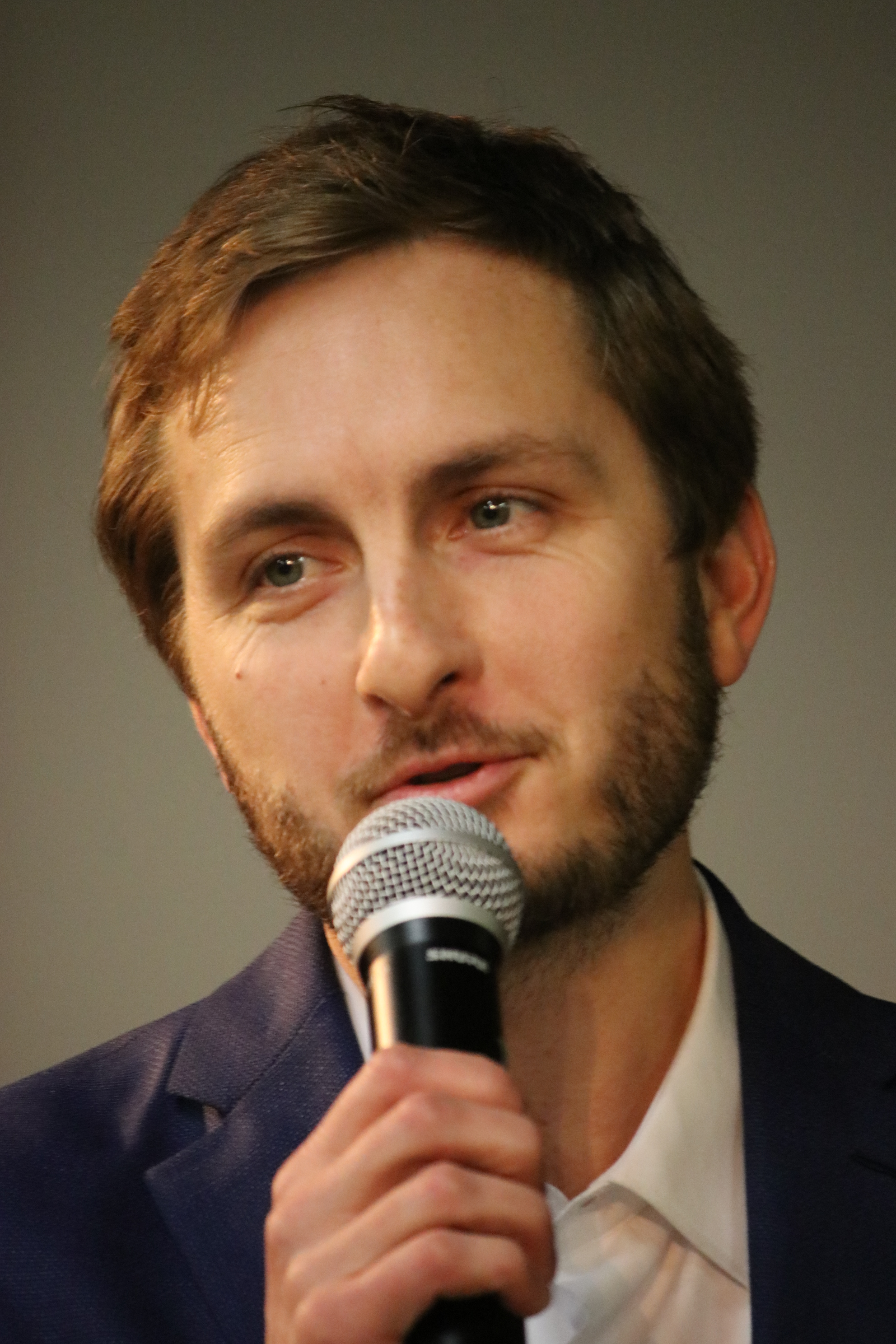
- Piquemal in 2023

Member of the National Assembly for Haute-Garonne's 4th constituency
- Incumbent
- Assumed office 22 June 2022
- Preceded by: Mickaël Nogal

Municipal councillor of Toulouse
- Incumbent
- Assumed office 27 March 2026
- In office 3 July 2020 – 9 November 2022

Personal details
- Born: François Jacques Benoît Michel Piquemal; 28 December 1984 (age 41) Besançon, France
- Party: La France Insoumise
- Education: University of Toulouse-Jean Jaurès
- Occupation: Teacher

François Jacques Benoît Michel Piquemal (French pronunciation: [fʁɑ̃swa pikəmal]; born 28 December 1984) is a French politician, teacher and activist who has represented the 4th constituency of Haute-Garonne in the National Assembly since 2022. A member of La France Insoumise (LFI), he ran as a candidate of the left-wing New Ecologic and Social People's Union (NUPES) coalition. Piquemal has also been a municipal councillor of Toulouse since 2026, previously holding a seat from 2020 to 2022.

== Biography ==
Piquemal was born in Besançon and studied at the University of Toulouse-Jean Jaurès. He lives in Toulouse's Patte d'Oie neighborhood.

Piquemal is a history and geography teacher. At the time of his election to the National Assembly, he served as a member of the Toulouse municipal council.

== 2022 National Assembly election ==
Piquemal officially entered the race for Haute-Garonne's 4th constituency in September 17, 2021. He made ending homelessness in France a top campaign priority, stating "It is not acceptable" for people to "die in the streets" in France. As a candidate, Piquemal was a vocal supporter of Jean-Luc Mélenchon's 2022 presidential candidacy.

In the second round of the contest, Piquemal faced real estate company owner Marie-Claire Constans of the Ensemble Citoyens party. Piquemal won the contest with 59.26% of the vote versus the 40.74% received by Constans.

== Political views and activism ==
As a candidate, issues central to Piquemal's program were ending homelessness, boosting consumer spending power through price freezes, and environmentalist policies. Amid the historic heat wave in France in June 2022, Piquemal criticized Macron's leadership and stressed that there is an "urgent need to act" on climate issues.

Following his victory, Piquemal stated that his movement was following in the "footsteps of Jean Jaurès".

In 2025, he joined the Global Sumud Flotilla and sailed for Gaza. After the boat on which he was travelling was intercepted, Piquemal was arrested by Israeli soldiers along with other crew members and held in Ketziot Prison for five days. He was repatriated to France on 7 October.

== Controversies ==
=== Refusal to shake hands ===
Piquemal drew international attention when, during voting to choose the president of the French National Assembly, he declined to shake the hand of secretary and National Rally MP Flavien Termet. A number of other MPs had also declined, but Piquemal chose to play rock paper scissors with Termet instead of shaking his hand. He chose 'scissors', thereby making Termet's handshake appear to be a losing play of 'paper'.

=== Alleged anti-white comments ===
In June 2025, the magazine Marianne reported that Piquemal, LFI candidate for the 2026 Toulouse municipal election, had privately declared that he did not want white candidates among the top candidates of his list. Piquemal categorically denied having made the comments and announced his intention to take legal action against Marianne.
