= Sandrine Bélier =

French jurist and politician (born 1973)

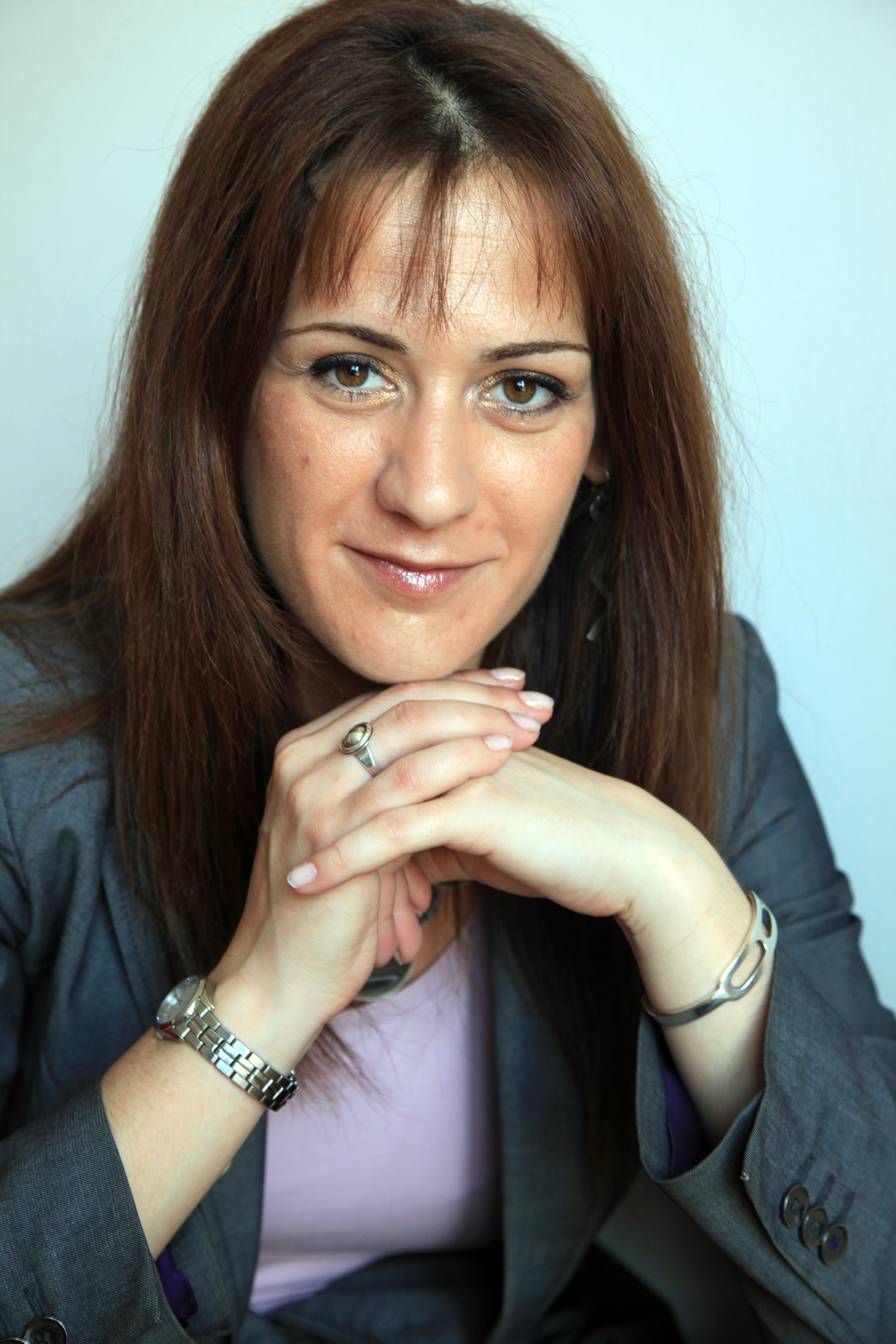
Sandrine Bélier in 2011

Sandrine Bélier (born 2 September 1973) is a French environmental jurist and politician of Europe Ecology – The Greens who served as a Member of the European Parliament from 2009 until 2014, representing the East constituency.

In 2009, Bélier was selected to lead the Europe Écologie list in the East constituency ahead of the 2009 European elections. Her list won over 14%, so she was easily elected to the European Parliament. From 2009 to 2012, she served on the Committee on the Environment, Public Health and Food Safety. On 30 June 2014, she led the delegation for relations of the European Parliament on a parliamentary tour to Japan.

== Early life ==
Bélier was born on 2 September 1973 in Longjumeau, Île-de-France, France.
