= Haute-Garonne's 4th constituency =

Constituency of the National Assembly of France

4th constituency of Haute-Garonne
- inline Constituency of the National Assembly of France

- Location of constituency in Department

- Location of Haute-Garonne in France
- Deputy: François Piquemal; LFI
- Department: Haute-Garonne

The 4th constituency of Haute-Garonne is a French legislative constituency in the Haute-Garonne département.

== Deputies ==
Election	Member	Party
1988	Robert Loïdi	PS
1993	Jean Diébold	RPR
1997	Yvette Benayoun Nakache	PS
2002	Jean Diébold	UMP
2007	Martine Martinel	PS
2012	Martine Martinel	PS
2017	Mickaël Nogal	LREM
2022	François Piquemal	LFI
2024	François Piquemal	LFI

== Election results ==
=== 2024 ===
Candidate	Party	Alliance	First round			Second round		
Candidate	Party	Alliance	Votes	%	+/–	Votes	%	+/–
François Piquemal	LFI	NFP	25,681	53.39	+6.85			
Margaux Pech	REN	Ensemble	12,950	26.92	+3.33			
Audrey Larregle	RN		7,531	15.66	+8.50			
Jacme Delmas	REG		945	1.96	+0.36			
Arthur Cottrel	REC		734	1.53	-2.60			
Patrick Marcireau	LO		262	0.54	+0.13			
Paul Cazals	NPA		0	0.00	new			
Votes			48,103	100.00				
Valid votes			48,103	97.87	-0.73			
Blank votes			650	1.32	+0.36			
Null votes			397	0.81	+0.37			
Turnout			49,150	70.25	+18.39			
Abstentions			20,810	29.75	-18.39			
Registered voters			69,960					
Result			LFI HOLD					

=== 2022 ===
Legislative Election 2022: Haute-Garonne's 4th constituency
Party	Candidate	Votes	%	±%
LFI (NUPÉS)	François Piquemal	16,321	46.54	+7.15
LREM (Ensemble)	Marie-Claire Constans	8,273	23.59	-12.48
LR	Bertrand Serp	3,084	8.80	−4.46
RN	Ewa Sadowski	2,512	7.16	+0.42
DVG	Fatiha Agag-Boudjahlat	1,676	4.78	N/A
REC	Arthur Cottrel	1,447	4.13	N/A
Others	N/A	1,752		
Turnout		35,564	51.86	+4.31
2nd round result
LFI (NUPÉS)	François Piquemal	19,467	59.26	+11.17
LREM (Ensemble)	Marie-Claire Constans	13,381	40.74	−11.17
Turnout		32,848	50.32	+9.25
LFI gain from LREM				

=== 2017 ===
Candidate	Label	First round		Second round	
Candidate	Label	Votes	%	Votes	%
Mickaël Nogal	REM	11,722	36.07	13,657	51.91
Liêm Hoang-Ngoc	FI	6,832	21.02	12,650	48.09
Bertrand Serp	LR	4,310	13.26		
Martine Martinel	PS	3,297	10.14		
Maïthé Carsalade	FN	2,189	6.74		
Élisabeth Matak	ECO	2,144	6.60		
Luc Ripoll	PCF	529	1.63		
David Amar	DIV	340	1.05		
Nina Merciez	DIV	338	1.04		
Fatiha Merchougui	DIV	224	0.69		
Julienne Mukabucyana	DVG	165	0.51		
Patrick Marcireau	EXG	138	0.42		
Fatiha Boudjahlat	DVG	114	0.35		
Mustafa Demirel	DIV	76	0.23		
Julian Menendez Gonzalez	DVD	43	0.13		
Karim Moutaouakkil	ECO	25	0.08		
Khadidjatou Alberte Sy Forsans	DVG	13	0.04		
Votes		32,499	100.00	26,307	100.00
Valid votes		32,499	98.55	26,307	92.38
Blank votes		325	0.99	1,552	5.45
Null votes		154	0.47	619	2.17
Turnout		32,978	47.55	28,478	41.07
Abstentions		36,370	52.45	40,870	58.93
Registered voters		69,348		69,348	
Source: Ministry of the Interior

=== 2012 ===
2012 legislative election in Haute-Garonne's 4th constituency
Candidate	Party	First round		Second round	
Candidate	Party	Votes	%	Votes	%
Martine Martinel	PS	14,696	42.13%	21,051	65.91%
Bertrand Serp	UMP	7,419	21.27%	10,887	34.09%
Monique Durrieu	FG	3,316	9.51%		
Sabrina Bazouin	FN	3,112	8.92%		
Régis Godec	EELV	2,764	7.92%		
Stéphane Diebold	DVD	1,001	2.87%		
Yvette Benayoun-Nakache	MoDem	641	1.84%		
Philippe Mattei	PP	515	1.48%		
Alexandre Trillou	AC	402	1.15%		
Sandy Velasco	AEI	318	0.91%		
Hegoa Garay	NPA	220	0.63%		
Sandra Mourgues	LGM–PR–NC	192	0.55%		
Patrick Marcireau	LO	104	0.30%		
David Veysseyre		69	0.20%		
Thierry Dupin	POI	60	0.17%		
Cédric Gougeon	SP	54	0.15%		
Valid votes		34,883	98.99%	31,938	97.08%
Spoilt and null votes		355	1.01%	961	2.92%
Votes cast / turnout		35,238	53.30%	32,899	49.77%
Abstentions		30,870	46.70%	33,204	50.23%
Registered voters		66,108	100.00%	66,103	100.00%

=== 2007 ===
Legislative Election 2007: Haute-Garonne's 4th constituency
Party	Candidate	Votes	%	±%
UMP	Jean Diébold	11,807	36.96	
PS	Martine Martinel	9,271	29.02	
MoDem	André Gallego	3,005	9.41	
Far left	François Simon	2,111	6.61	
LV	Danielle Charles	1,245	3.90	
FN	Michele Guerin	1,008	3.16	
Far left	Marie Neuville	988	3.09	
PCF	Monique Durrieu	956	2.99	
Others	N/A	1,554		
Turnout		32,286	58.09	
2nd round result
PS	Martine Martinel	17,752	56.46	
UMP	Jean Diébold	13,689	43.54	
Turnout		32,193	57.92	
PS gain from UMP				

=== 2002 ===
Legislative Election 2002: Haute-Garonne's 4th constituency
Party	Candidate	Votes	%	±%
UMP	Jean Diébold	13,228	40.82	
PS	Yvette Benatoun Nakache	11,022	34.01	
FN	Nadine Seguelas	2,707	8.35	
LV	Danielle Charles	1,655	5.11	
LCR	Stephane Borras	1,000	3.09	
PCF	Gilles Chinour	854	2.64	
Others	N/A	1,943		
Turnout		32,875	65.30	
2nd round result
UMP	Jean Diébold	15,029	50.88	
PS	Yvette Benatoun Nakache	14,51	49.12	
Turnout		30,468	60.52	
UMP gain from PS				

=== 1997 ===
Legislative Election 1997: Haute-Garonne's 4th constituency
Party	Candidate	Votes	%	±%
RPR	Jean Diébold	10,071	34.38	
PS	Yvette Benayoun Nakeche	8,788	30.00	
FN	Jean-Pascal Serbéra	4,008	13.68	
PCF	Sylviane Ainardi	2,465	8.42	
LO	Robert Roig	790	2.70	
GE	Luc Licari	757	2.58	
LCR	Frédéric Borras	657	2.24	
Others	N/A	1,754		
Turnout		30,326	60.96	
2nd round result
PS	Yvette Benayoun Nakeche	15,503	50.40	
RPR	Jean Diébold	15,254	49.60	
Turnout		32,177	64.7	
PS gain from RPR				
