= Michèle Striffler =

French politician

Michèle Striffler MEP
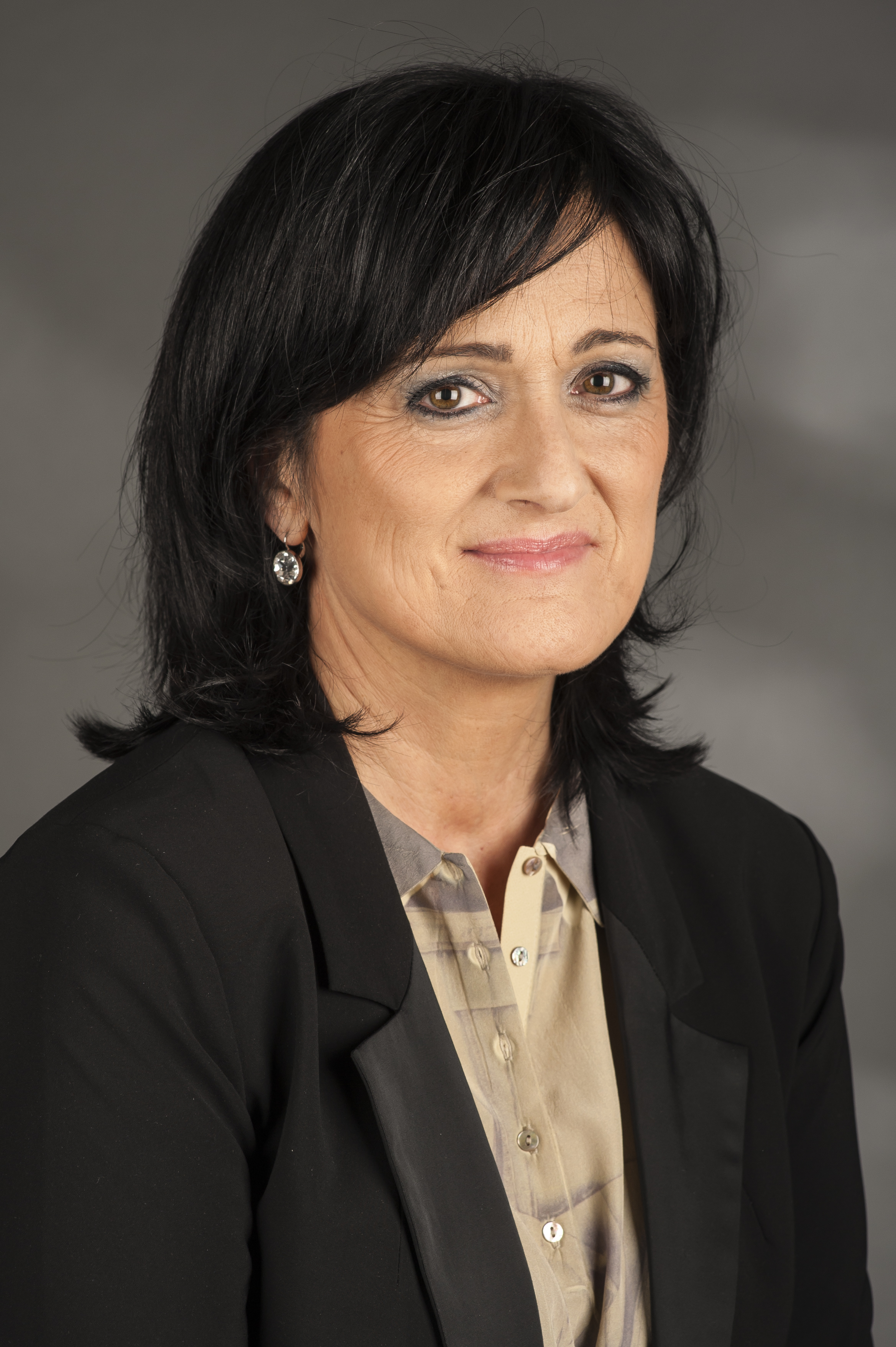

Member of the European Parliament for France
- In office 2009–2014

Personal details
- Born: 23 August 1957 (age 68) Mulhouse, France
- Party: La République En Marche!

Michèle Striffler (born 23 August 1957 in Mulhouse, Haut-Rhin) is a French politician who served as a Member of the European Parliament (MEP) for the East constituency from 2009 to 2014.

== Political career ==
Striffler was a member of the liberal wing of the Socialist Party, close to Jean-Marie Bockel, but she joined Bockel's Modern Left (LGM). The Modern Left is a member of the presidential majority of Nicolas Sarkozy. Striffler is assistant to the mayor of Mulhouse, Bockel.

In the 2009 European elections, Striffler was the second candidate on the Union for a Popular Movement (UMP) list in the East region, and was elected to the European Parliament, where she sat with the Group of the European People's Party. From 2009 to 2012, she served as vice chair on the Committee on Development in the European Parliament. In addition to her committee assignments, she was part of the Parliament's delegation to the ACP–EU Joint Parliamentary Assembly.

For the 2014 European election, Striffler was third-placed on the UMP's list in the East constituency. Her party won only one seat in the region, so she was not re-elected. In the 2019 elections, she ran again, this time for the Animalist Party.

== Taking a stand ==
Sensitive to animal welfare issues, she has made several speeches and signed a number of declarations on the subject, including on the transport of horses and animals for slaughter; on broader protection for animals used for scientific purposes; on the banning of shark finning and against deep-sea trawling. Patron of CREL, Club de Reconnaissance et d'Entraide aux Levriers, she has intervened on several occasions in the European Parliament to denounce the mistreatment of greyhounds, particularly in Spain (Galgos and Podencos). She is also a member of the Parliamentary Intergroup for Animal Welfare and Protection and of the Fédération des luttes pour l'abolition des corridas (FLAC).
