= Nathalie Griesbeck =

French politician (born 1956)

Nathalie Griesbeck MEP
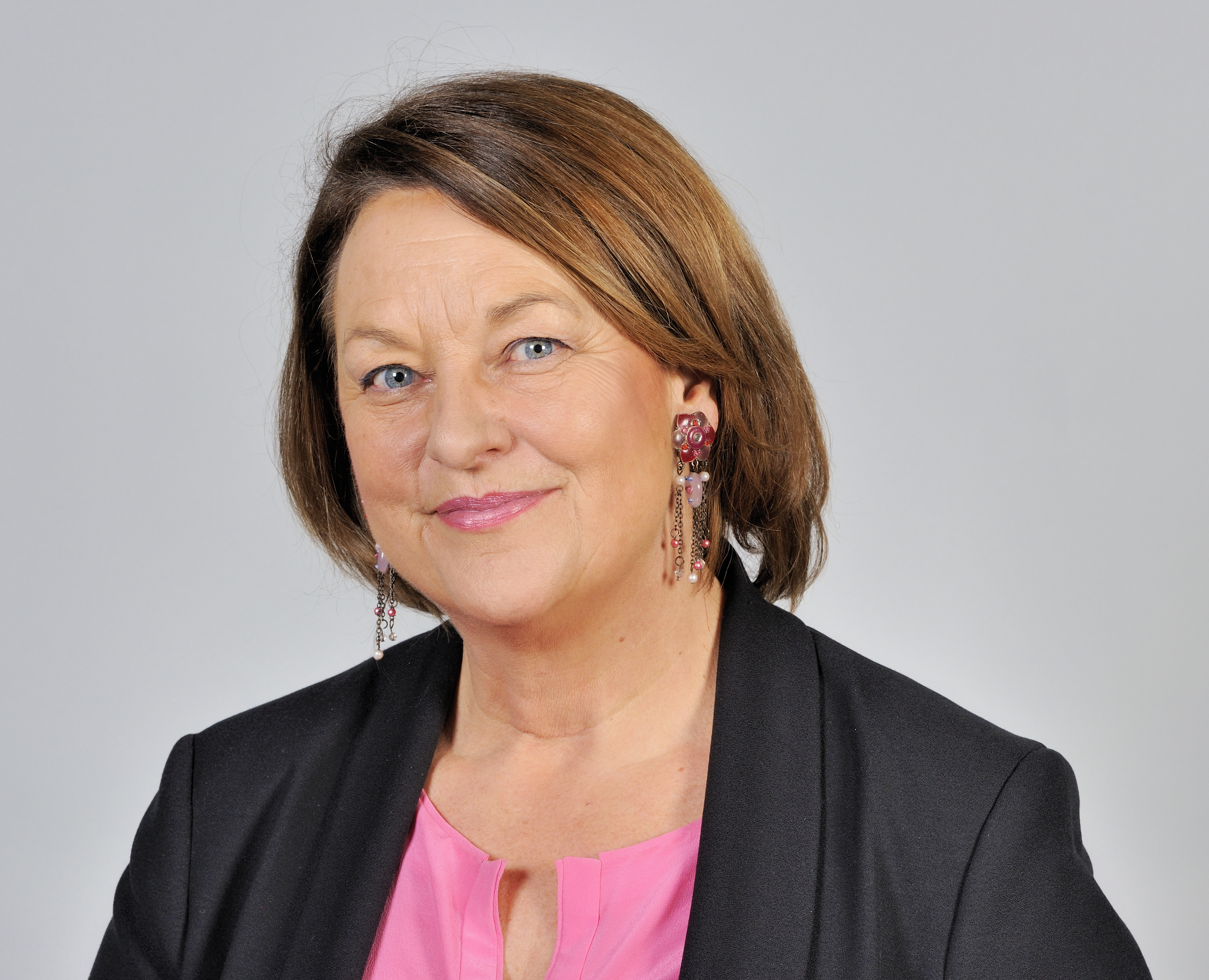

Member of the European Parliament
- In office 2004–2019

Personal details
- Born: 24 May 1956 (age 69) Metz, France
- Party: French: Democratic Movement; EU; ALDE

Natalie Griesbeck (born 24 May 1956 in Metz) is a French politician who served as a Member of the European Parliament for the East of France from 2004 until 2019. She is a member of the Democratic Movement (MoDem), part of the Alliance of Liberals and Democrats for Europe.

== Education and early career ==
Griesbeck has a master's degree in public law (1979) and postgraduate diplomas (DEAs) in public law (1980) and legal history (1981).

She was formerly a lecturer in public law at the University of Metz, and has also served as deputy mayor of Metz, with responsibility for finance and economic development, vice-chair of Metz Council, with responsibility for economic development, a member of the Moselle Council, and chair of Transcité (2001–2003). She holds the Palmes académiques and the Ordre National du Mérite.

== Member of the European Parliament, 2004–2019 ==
Griesbeck first became a Member of the European Parliament in the 2004 European elections. She first served on the Committee on Budgets from 2004 until 2009 before joining the Committee on Civil Liberties, Justice and Home Affairs in 2009. From 2017, she also chaired the Special Committee on Terrorism, a temporary body to address the practical and legislative deficiencies in the fight against terrorism across the EU.

On the Committee on Civil Liberties, Justice and Home Affairs, Griesbeck served as rapporteur on the situation of unaccompanied minors in the EU, among other issues.

In addition to her committee assignments, Griesbeck served as a member of the parliament's delegation to the ACP–EU Joint Parliamentary Assembly; the European Parliament Intergroup on Children's Rights; and the European Parliament Intergroup on Extreme Poverty and Human Rights. She was also a supporter of the MEP Heart Group, a group of parliamentarians who have an interest in promoting measures that will help reduce the burden of cardiovascular diseases (CVD). She was previously a member of the European Parliament's delegation for relations with Mercosur and a substitute for the delegation for relations with the countries of Southeast Asia and ASEAN.

MoDem chairman François Bayrou included Griesbeck in his shadow cabinet in 2010, in preparation for the 2012 French presidential election; in this capacity, Griesbeck served as opposition counterpart to Minister of Justice Michel Mercier.

Griesbeck was the second candidate in the East constituency on the MoDem list, while Jean-François Kahn was the top candidate. The list only won one seat, but Kahn resigned before the session opened, giving his position to Griesbeck.

== Other activities ==
In addition to her parliamentary work, Griesbeck at one point listed 68 different board memberships in the medical sector.
