= Éric Michoux =

French politician (born 1959)

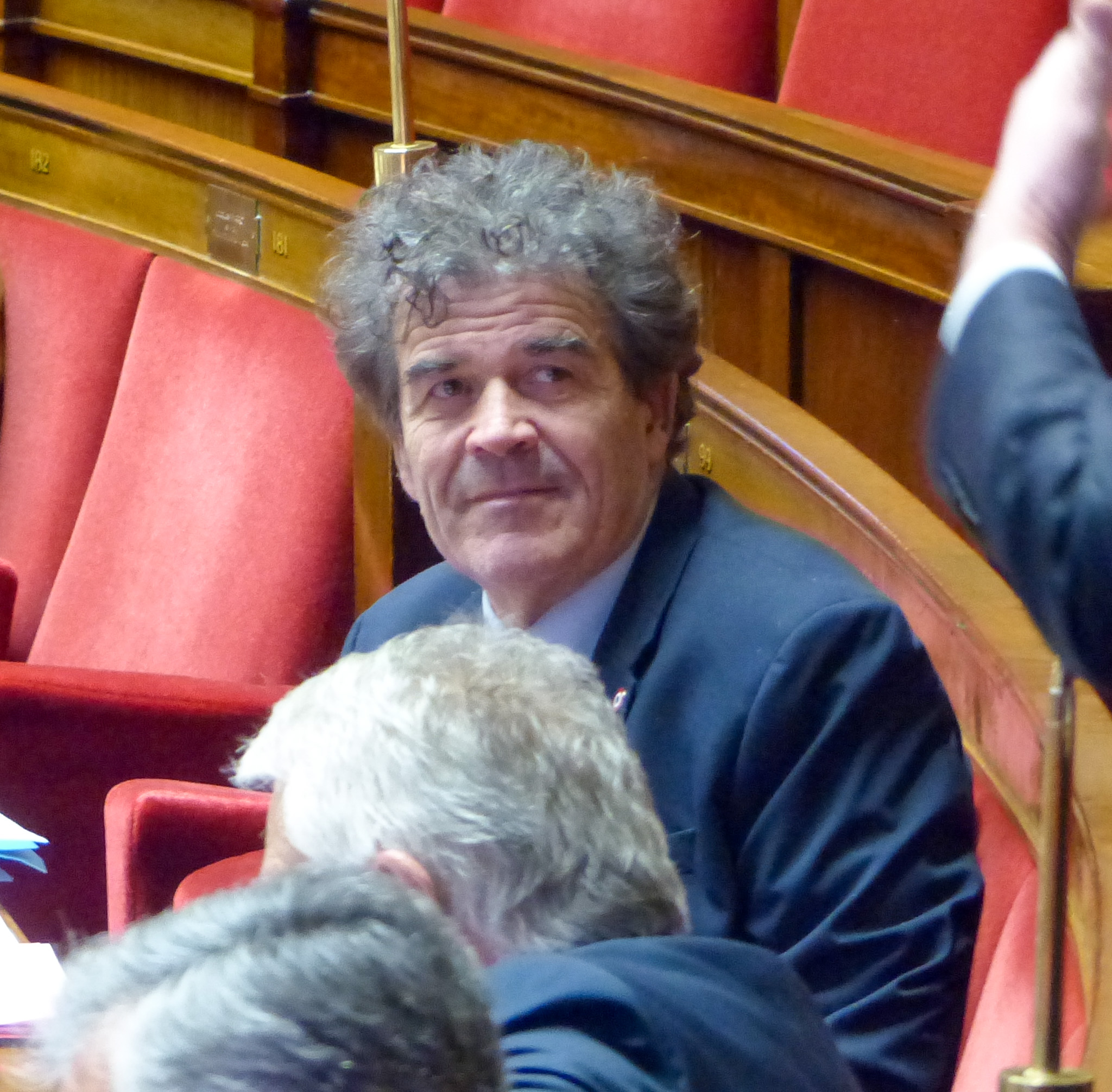
- Eric Michoux

Member of the National Assembly for Saône-et-Loire's 4th constituency
- Incumbent
- Assumed office 8 July 2024
- Preceded by: Cécile Untermaier

Mayor of Épervans
- In office 21 March 2008 – 2 August 2024
- Preceded by: Yves Lehanneur
- Succeeded by: Patrick Pinard

Personal details
- Born: 17 June 1959 (age 67) Paris, France
- Party: Union of the Right for the Republic (2024–present)
- Other political affiliations: The Republicans (formerly)
- Occupation: Businessman

Éric Michoux (French pronunciation: [eʁik miʃu]; born 17 June 1959) is a French businessman and politician of the Union of the Right for the Republic (UDR) who has represented the 4th constituency of Saône-et-Loire in the National Assembly since 2024.
