= Valérie Deloge =

French farmer and politician (born 1966)

Valérie Deloge MEP
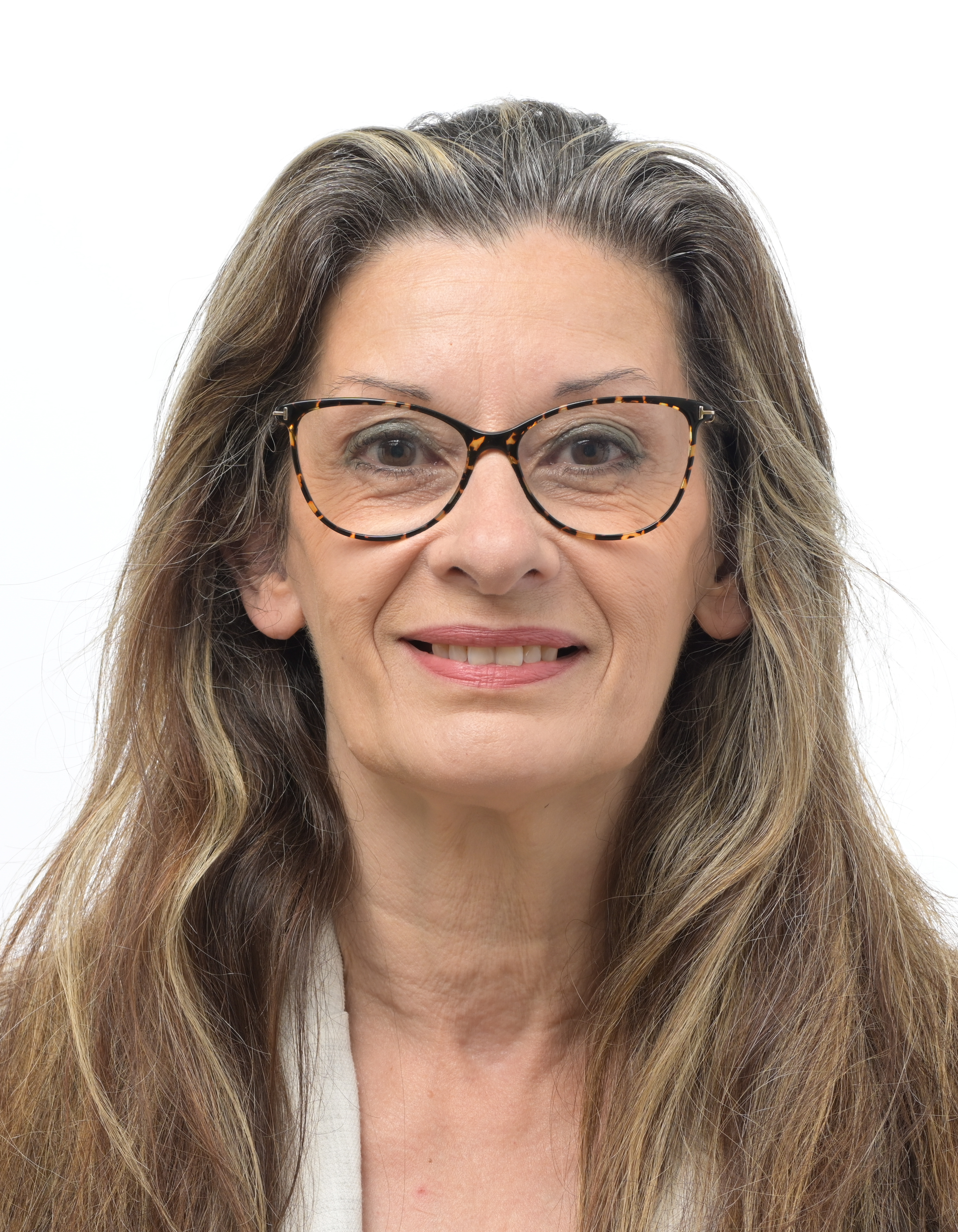

Member of the European Parliament for France
- Incumbent
- Assumed office 16 July 2024

Personal details
- Born: 9 May 1966 (age 59)
- Party: National Rally
- Other political affiliations: Identity and Democracy Party

Valérie Deloge (born 9 May 1966) is a French farmer and politician of the National Rally who was elected member of the European Parliament in 2024. She has served in the Regional Council of Bourgogne-Franche-Comté since 2021, and was a candidate for Saône-et-Loire's 4th constituency in the 2022 legislative election.
