= Cécile Untermaier =

French politician and official

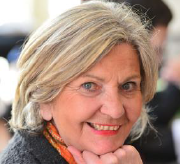

Member of the National Assembly for Saône-et-Loire's 4th constituency
- In office 20 June 2012 – 9 June 2024
- Preceded by: Didier Mathus
- Succeeded by: Éric Michoux

Personal details
- Born: 28 December 1951 (age 74) Belley, France
- Party: Socialist Party

Cécile Untermaier (born 28 December 1951) is a French civil servant and politician from the Socialist Party. She served as a member of the National Assembly for Saône-et-Loire's 4th constituency from 2012 to 2024.

== See also ==
- List of deputies of the 14th National Assembly of France
- List of deputies of the 15th National Assembly of France
- List of deputies of the 16th National Assembly of France
