= Martine Martinel =

French politician

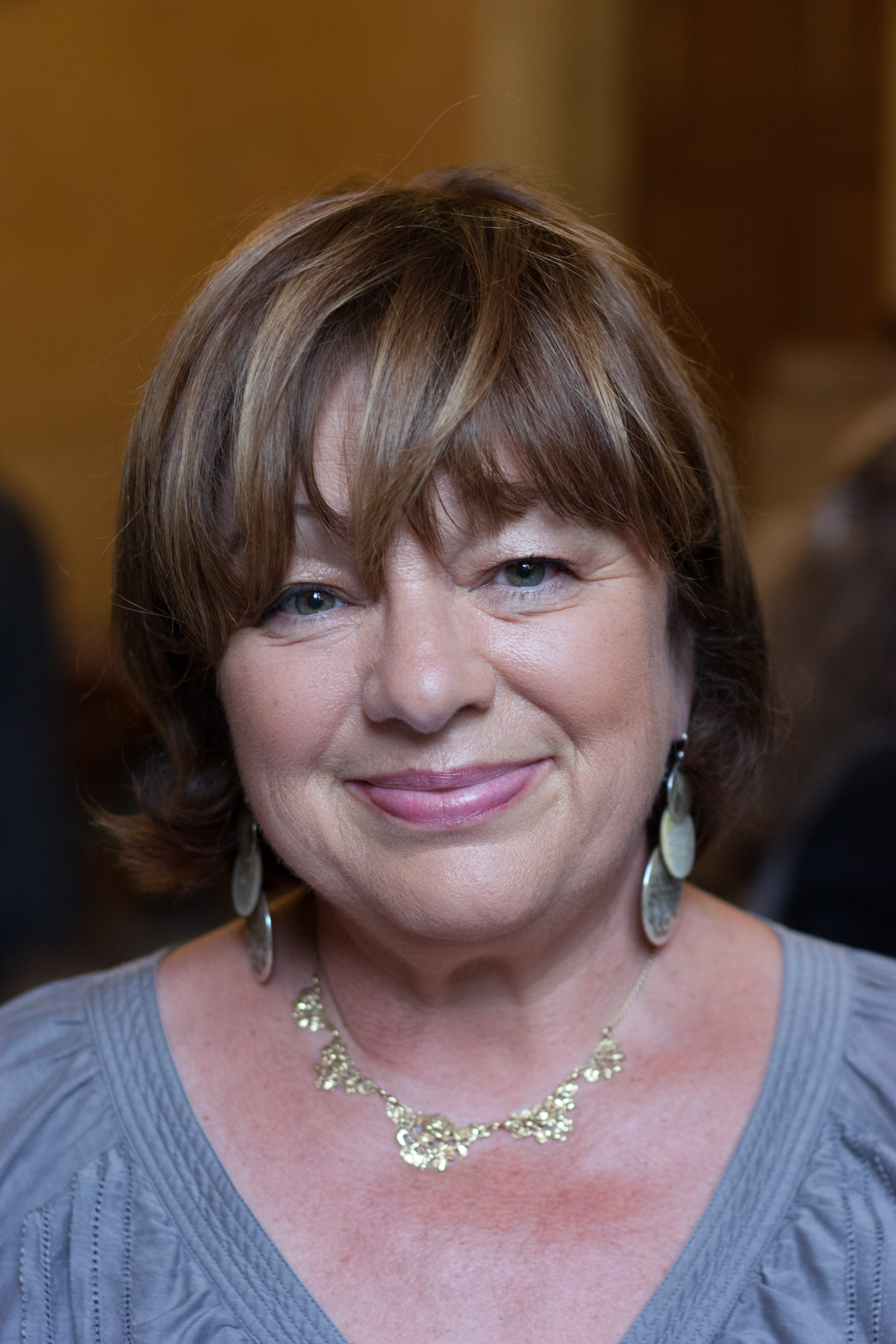
- Martine Martinel in 2012

Deputy for Haute-Garonne's 4th constituency in the National Assembly of France
- In office 2007–2017
- Preceded by: Jean Diébold
- Succeeded by: Mickaël Nogal

Personal details
- Born: 26 September 1953 (age 73) Toulouse
- Party: PS

Martine Martinel (born 26 September 1953) was a member of the National Assembly of France from 2007 to 2017. She represented Haute-Garonne's 4th constituency, as a member of the Socialiste, radical, citoyen et divers gauche.

On 28 February 2013, The Commission des affaires culturelles et de l’éducation, of which Martinel was part, voted in favour of an amendment proposed by Martine Faure, and favoured by Yves Durand, Marie-George Buffet and Martinel among others, to replace, in the national elementary curriculum, the biological concept of "sex" with the concept of "gender" to include a social dimension. The elementary curriculum was successfully revised in September 2013 under the name "l'ABCD de l'egalite".
