= Véronique Mathieu =

French politician (born 1955)

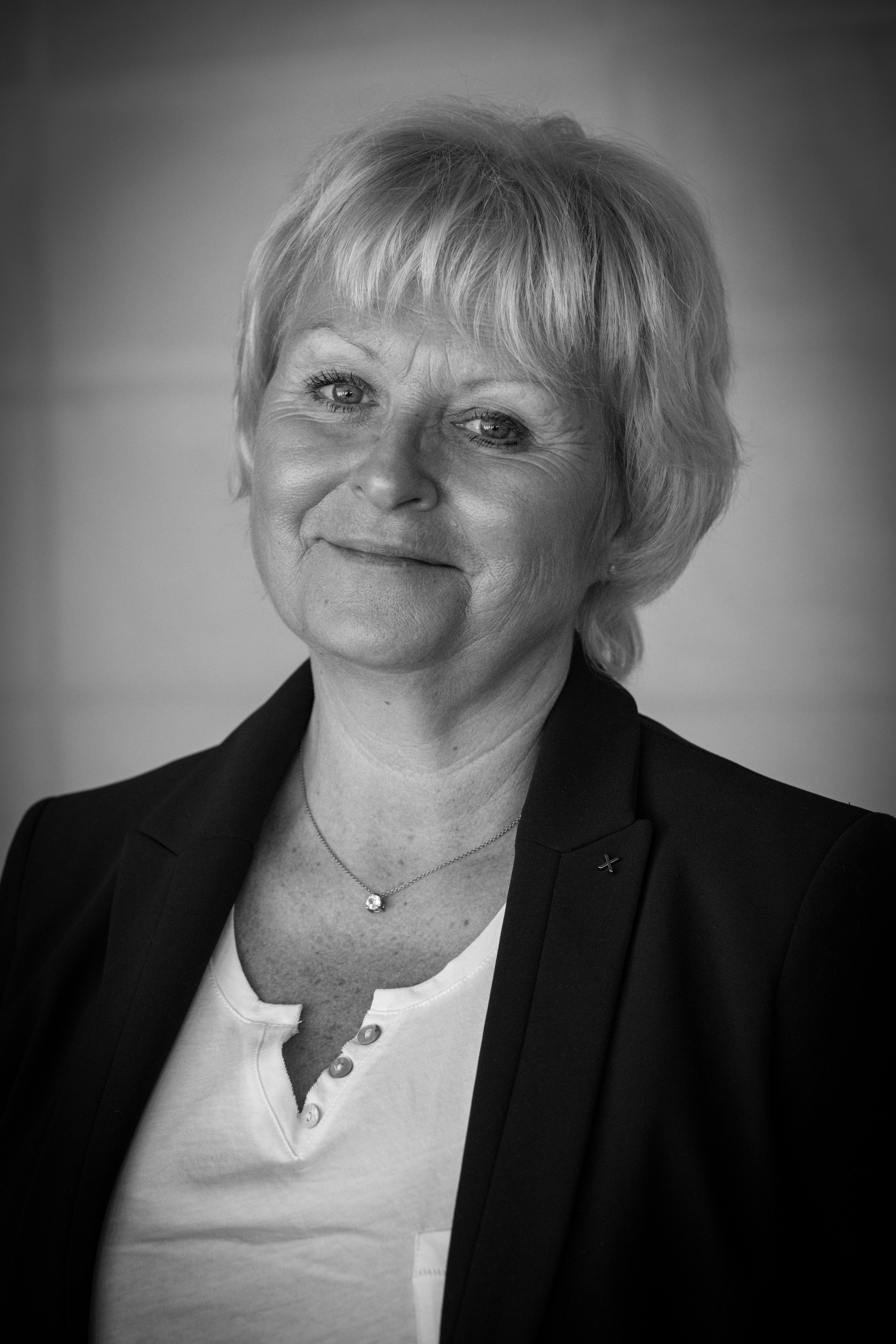
Véronique Mathieu Houillon, 2016

Video Introduction (French)

Véronique Mathieu (born 28 October 1955 in Nancy, Meurthe-et-Moselle) is a French politician who served as a Member of the European Parliament from 1999 until 2014, representing the East of France. She is a member of the Radical Party, associated to the Union for a Popular Movement, part of the European People's Party.

From 2012 to 2013, Mathieu served on the special committee on organised crime, corruption and money laundering in the European Parliament.
