= Follow the Money =

Follow the money is a catchphrase popularized by the 1976 drama-documentary motion picture All The President's Men.

Follow the Money may also refer to:

- Follow the Money (TV series), a Danish financial crime thriller first broadcast in 2016
- "Follow the Money", a 2017 episode of Family Guy
- OpenSecrets, an American nonprofit organization that tracks campaign finance data that owns the website FollowTheMoney.org
