= Didier Mathus =

French politician

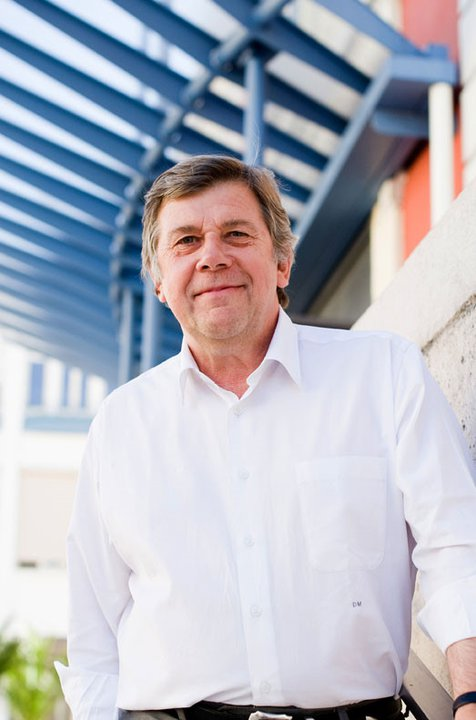
Didier Mathus

Didier Mathus (born 25 May 1952 in Montceau-les-Mines) is a member of the National Assembly of France. He represents the Saône-et-Loire department, and is a member of the Socialiste, radical, citoyen et divers gauche.
