= Manfred Weber =

German politician (born 1972)

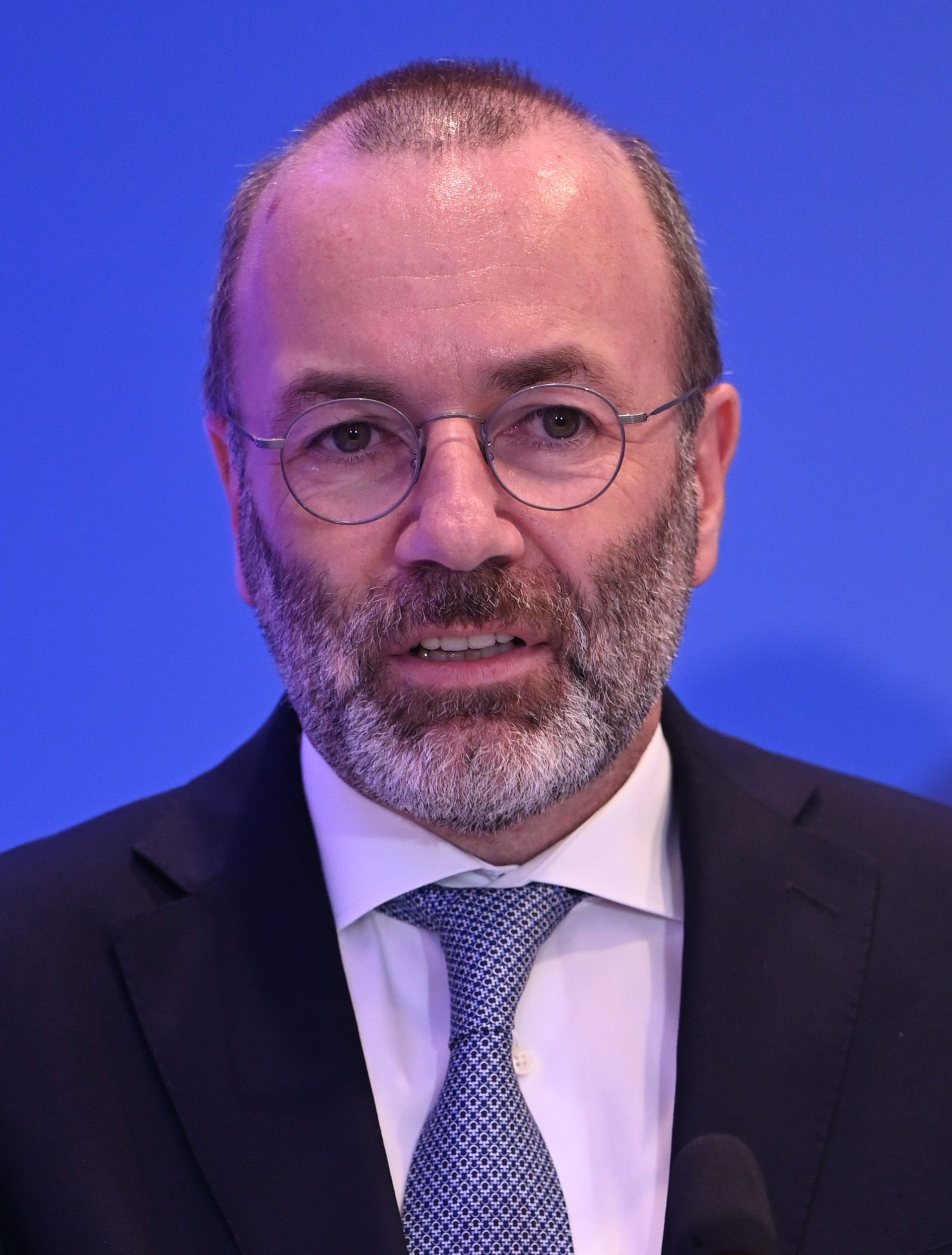
- Weber in 2025

President of the European People's Party
- Incumbent
- Assumed office 1 June 2022
- Preceded by: Donald Tusk

Leader of the European People's Party in the European Parliament
- Incumbent
- Assumed office 4 June 2014
- President: Donald Tusk; Himself
- Preceded by: Joseph Daul

Member of the European Parliament for Germany
- Incumbent
- Assumed office 13 June 2004

Member of the Landtag of Bavaria
- In office 21 September 2003 – 12 June 2004

Personal details
- Born: 14 July 1972 (age 54) Niederhatzkofen, West Germany
- Party: Christian Social Union (since 1989)
- Education: Munich University of Applied Sciences

Manfred Anton Weber (born 14 July 1972) is a German politician who has been serving as president of the European People's Party (EPP) since 2022 and as Leader of the EPP Group in the European Parliament since 2014. He has been a Member of the European Parliament (MEP) from Germany since 2004. He is a member of the Christian Social Union (CSU), part of the EPP.

In the 2003 Bavarian state elections, Weber became the state's youngest parliamentarian at the age of 31. Heading the EPP Group, he was the youngest group leader in the Parliament at the time of his appointment in 2014, as well as the youngest-ever group leader of the EPP. Weber is known as a moderate politician and power broker in EU politics.

In September 2018, Weber declared his intention to run for the position of President of the European Commission, and was elected as the Spitzenkandidat of the EPP in November. On 26 May 2019, Weber's EPP won the most seats in the European Parliament, thus making Weber the lead candidate to become the next President of the European Commission. It was announced on 28 May that the new European Commission President would be picked at an EU summit in June; Weber was not nominated, with Ursula von der Leyen selected instead.

== Early life and education ==
Manfred Weber was born in Niederhatzkofen near Rottenburg an der Laaber, Bavaria, as the second of three sons. He completed military service in Neuburg an der Donau, graduating in engineering physics at the Munich University of Applied Sciences in 1996. After graduation he worked as a self-empoyed engineering consultant, later also founding two firms.

== Political career ==
Weber joined the Young Union and the Christian Social Union (CSU) in 1989, at the age of 16.

=== Career in state politics ===
From 2002–2014, Weber was a member of the Kelheim District Council. From 2002 until 2004, he served as Member of the Landtag of Bavaria.

In 2003, Weber succeeded Markus Söder as chairman of the Junge Union in Bavaria; he served in that position until 2007. In this capacity, he also joined the CSU executive board. In 2008, he succeeded Erwin Huber as chairman of the CSU of Lower Bavaria, one of the party's ten districts.

=== Member of the European Parliament, 2004–present ===
Weber served on the European Parliament's Committee on Civil Liberties, Justice and Home Affairs from 2004 until 2012 and on the Committee on Constitutional Affairs from 2012 until 2014. During that time, he was a substitute for the Committee on Regional Development, a member of the Delegation for relations with India, a substitute for the Delegation for relations with the countries of the Andean Community and a substitute on the Subcommittee on Human Rights. As rapporteur, he negotiated in 2008 for the European Parliament Directive on common standards and procedures in Member States for returning illegally staying third-country nationals (Return Directive), the first Directive in the field of home affairs to be adopted through the ordinary legislative procedure.

After his reelection in 2009 Weber became vice-chairman of the European People's Party group in the European Parliament under the leadership of chairman Joseph Daul. In that capacity, he was responsible for setting the political strategy and the policy in the area of Justice and Home affairs.

Weber has been chairing the EPP group since 2014. He has since been a member of the Conference of Presidents of the European Parliament, first under the leadership of Martin Schulz (2014–2017) and later Antonio Tajani (since 2017). Between 2014 and 2016, Weber was a member of the now defunct G5 group along with European Commission President Jean-Claude Juncker, Vice President Frans Timmermans, Socialist group leader Gianni Pittella and Martin Schulz, then President of the European Parliament. In early 2017, Weber established the so-called G6, a group of parliamentary leaders including Pittella as well as Guy Verhofstadt of the Alliance of Liberals and Democrats for Europe (ALDE), Syed Kamall of the European Conservatives and Reformists (ECR), Ska Keller of the Greens, and Gabi Zimmer of the European United Left–Nordic Green Left.

==== Unsuccessful candidacy for President of the European Commission ====
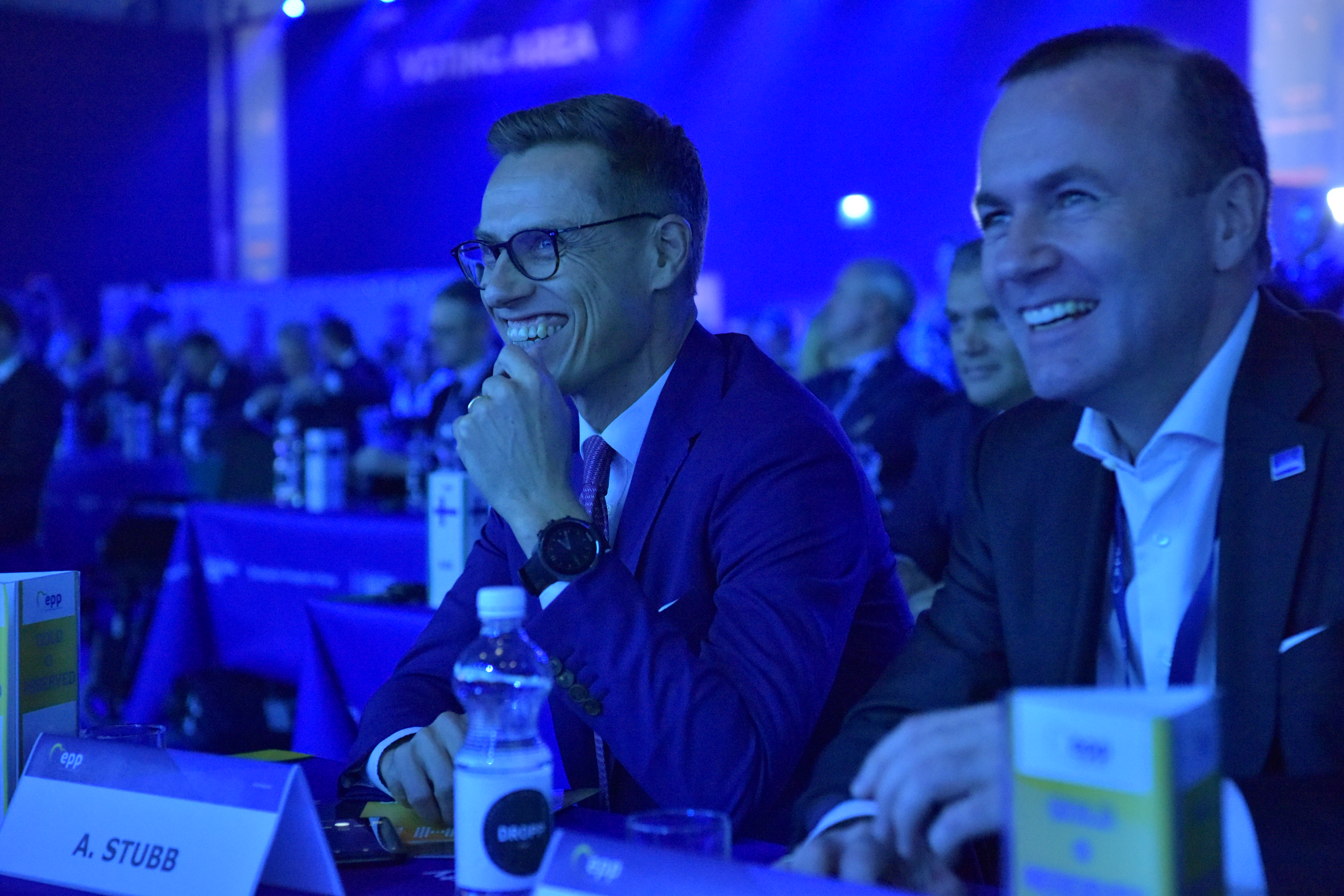
Alexander Stubb and Manfred Weber in 2018 EPP Helsinki congress

In September 2018, Weber announced his candidacy (Spitzenkandidat) for the post of the President of the European Commission for the 2019 European election. (Under the unofficial Spitzenkandidat system, the leader of the European party that commands the largest coalition in the European Parliament subsequent to an election to the European Parliament is likely to become the European Commission president.)

Weber's European People's Party won a plurality of seats in the European Parliament in May 2019, thus making him the lead candidate to succeed Jean-Claude Juncker as President of the European Commission unless the Spitzenkandidat system was abandoned. On 28 May, leaders of EU governments tasked European Council President Donald Tusk with leading the negotiations with members of the European Parliament and national leaders to pick a new European Commission President at an EU summit in late June 2019. Tusk hinted that Weber was the "lead candidate." This did not materialise with Ursula von der Leyen, a fellow member of the European People's Party, being appointed president.

In 2022, Weber become president of the EPP.

In 2023, he was invited by Mateusz Morawiecki for an election debate before the same year's election due to controversies related with Donald Tusk.

=== Role in national politics ===
In 2015, Bavaria's Minister President Horst Seehofer nominated Weber as one of his deputies in the office of CSU chairman, making him part of the party's leadership. In the negotiations to form a coalition government under the leadership of Chancellor Angela Merkel following the 2017 federal elections, he was part of the working group on European policy, led by Peter Altmaier, Alexander Dobrindt and Achim Post. Merkel and her government also have backed Weber's bid to become President of the European Commission.

=== European People's Party presidency ===
At the European People's Party Congress in Rotterdam in May 2022, Weber was elected president of the EPP, while Thanasis Bakolas was elected secretary general.

In 2023, Euractiv reported that unnamed EPP officials had expressed concerns about Weber's leadership style and about his receiving a second salary as EPP president in addition to his remuneration as a Member of the European Parliament.

Weber has had documented political links with figures from Greece's New Democracy party, which is a member of the EPP. In 2019, Euractiv reported that Weber launched his campaign as the EPP's lead candidate for the presidency of the European Commission in Athens, and that New Democracy leader Kyriakos Mitsotakis had supported Weber's candidacy from the beginning. In 2023, Euractiv reported that an unnamed EPP official described Mitsotakis and Austrian Chancellor Karl Nehammer as Weber's two strong backers within the party.

In 2026, Follow the Money, in a joint investigation with the Greek outlet inside story, reported that after Weber became EPP president, the party hired two one-person consultancies with links to New Democracy. According to the report, HD Heavyweight Ltd, owned by Vasilis Zagoritis, was paid more than €260,000 between October 2022 and January 2023, while Campaign Lab Ltd, owned by Ioannis Vlastaris, was paid €308,827, bringing the reported total to more than €568,000 over about six months. The report stated that former EPP staff members questioned the value of the services provided, that the European Parliament declined to reimburse most of the amounts, and that the contracts were subsequently ended. An EPP spokesperson said that the party had undergone restructuring after the 2022 Rotterdam congress and that the hiring formed part of efforts to strengthen digital communications and ties with national member parties.

== Political positions ==
=== European integration ===
On 7 June 2014, Weber dismissed demands by British Prime Minister David Cameron to put the brakes on European integration. Weber stated that "The EU is based on an ever closer union of European peoples. That is set out in the treaties. It is not negotiable for us... We cannot sell the soul of Europe... if we grant every national parliament a veto right, Europe would come to a standstill." However, he supported Cameron's demand that Britain, as a non-euro country, should be empowered to influence eurozone policy decisions. He also told The Guardian in early 2015 that the United Kingdom's drive to freeze welfare payments for EU immigrants was justified and set an example for the rest of the union.

Commenting on the UK's vote to leave the European Union, Weber said, "The British people decided to leave this union, so they will not be so comfortable, so safe, not so economically strong. That's why we will say that it really is a very negative day."

In 2018, Weber supported a proposal to grant free Interrail tickets to all EU citizens on their 18th birthday. The tickets would have allowed recipients to travel within the European Union for one month. Weber argued that the proposal was intended to bring young Europeans together, stating, "It is about bringing people together. We must arrange for young people to be thrilled by Europe again." The proposal did not receive broad support, in part because of its estimated annual cost of €2.3 billion.

=== Greece and the eurozone crisis ===
During the Greek government-debt crisis, Weber criticised the Greek government's handling of bailout negotiations and opposed calls for a debt relief for Greece. In June 2015, amid negotiations between Greece and its creditors, Weber said that the latest reform proposals submitted by Greece were more substantial than previous proposals, but stated that Europe would not be "blackmailed" by Greece.

In February 2017, Weber said that participation by the International Monetary Fund was no longer crucial for Greece's third bailout programme. He argued that if the IMF insisted on a debt cut for Greece, it should no longer participate, saying that "Europe can stand on its own feet now". Reuters reported that this position broke with the German government's official line that the programme would end if the IMF withdrew.

Weber's stance on Greece became an issue during the 2019 European Parliament election campaign, which he launched in Athens as the European People's Party's lead candidate for president of the European Commission. According to The Guardian, Greek prime minister Alexis Tsipras accused Weber of having supported "Grexit" during the debt crisis and described him as "anti-Hellenic". At the same campaign event, Weber criticised Tsipras's economic policies and expressed support for New Democracy leader Kyriakos Mitsotakis.

=== Conflicts over Hungary ===
In July 2013, when the European Parliament Committee on Civil Liberties, Justice and Home Affairs (LIBE) issued the Tavares Report criticizing the erosion of fundamental rights in Hungary, Weber dismissed it as a politically motivated attack on the government of Hungarian Prime Minister Viktor Orbán by leftist parties. However, in September 2018 he approved the Sargentini report voting to trigger Article 7 of the Treaty on European Union procedure against the government of Hungarian Prime Minister Viktor Orbán. Nevertheless, as head of the group, he failed in preventing a split in the European People's Party group: 115 of its deputies voted in favour of the move, while 57 voted against, with 28 abstentions and 20 stayed away from voting.

In the run-up of the 2019 European Parliament election, Weber could not stop Orbán from his poster campaign targeting European Commission President Jean-Claude Juncker and billionaire George Soros. Eventually, on 20 March 2019, the EPP suspended the membership of Orban's party Fidesz. When Fidesz withdrew from the EPP-Group under threat of expulsion in March 2021, Weber declared it a "sad day" for the EPP and thanked Fidesz members for their past contributions.

=== Relations with Russia ===
In a 2016 letter to Sigmar Gabriel, German economy minister, and Miguel Arias Cañete, EU energy commissioner, Weber criticized the proposed Nord Stream 2 pipeline project, in that it would undermine the EU's foreign and security goals by increasing dependence on Gazprom, Russia's gas export monopoly. Rather than new supplies across the Baltic, Weber called upon the commission to accelerate its efforts to import more gas across Turkey from the Caspian Sea, and even potentially Iran and Iraq.

In response to the arrest and detention of Alexei Navalny in early 2021, Weber demanded that the EU cut financial transactions from President Vladimir Putin's inner circle.

=== Gay conversion therapies ===
In March 2018, Weber voted against initiatives prohibiting gay conversion therapies, unlike the majority of the European People Party's MEPs.

=== Doñana National Park conflict ===
In April 2023, the Regional Government of Andalusia, led by the conservative People's Party, proposed a law to legalise to date illegal extraction of water for irrigation in the Doñana National Park, home to one of Europe's largest wetlands and UNESCO World Heritage, threatened by drought. The European Commission warned that this would constitute "a flagrant violation of the provisions of the judgment of the Court of Justice". Weber disagreed on this stance, accusing the von der Leyen Commission of playing "party politics" and of campaigning against the regional Government of Andalucía and in favour of Spanish Socialist Prime Minister Pedro Sánchez.

Incumbent European Commissioner for Environment, Oceans and Fisheries Virginijus Sinkevičius contradicted Weber pointing out, that "Doñana is important for Spain & the EU". Observers interpret the clash between the von der Leyen Commission and Weber – both are conservatives – as a new attempt by Weber to position himself for the presidency of the European Commission in the upcoming 2024 elections.

=== European Green Deal ===
In July 2023, Weber tried to block the Nature Restoration Law, saying it would destroy farmers' livelihoods and threaten food security.

=== Offshore asylum schemes ===
In March 2024, the EPP unveiled its new manifesto, which garnered media attention for several controversial proposals. Among these was the offshore asylum scheme, aimed at accommodating illegal migrants in third-world countries. While some saw this proposal as a strategic move to appeal to conservative voters, others criticized it as a shift towards the far-right for the EPP.

== Personal life ==
Weber is Catholic and a member of the Central Committee of German Catholics since 2016. He married his wife in 2002.

== Other activities ==
- European Academy of Bavaria, Member of the Board of Trustees
- Institute for European Politics (IEP), Member of the Board of Trustees
- Central Committee of German Catholics (ZdK), Member
- Friends of Braunau in Rohr Abbey, Chairman

Party political offices
Preceded by Joseph Daul	Leader of the European People's Party in the European Parliament; 2014–present	Incumbent
