= Joseph Daul =

French politician (born 1947)

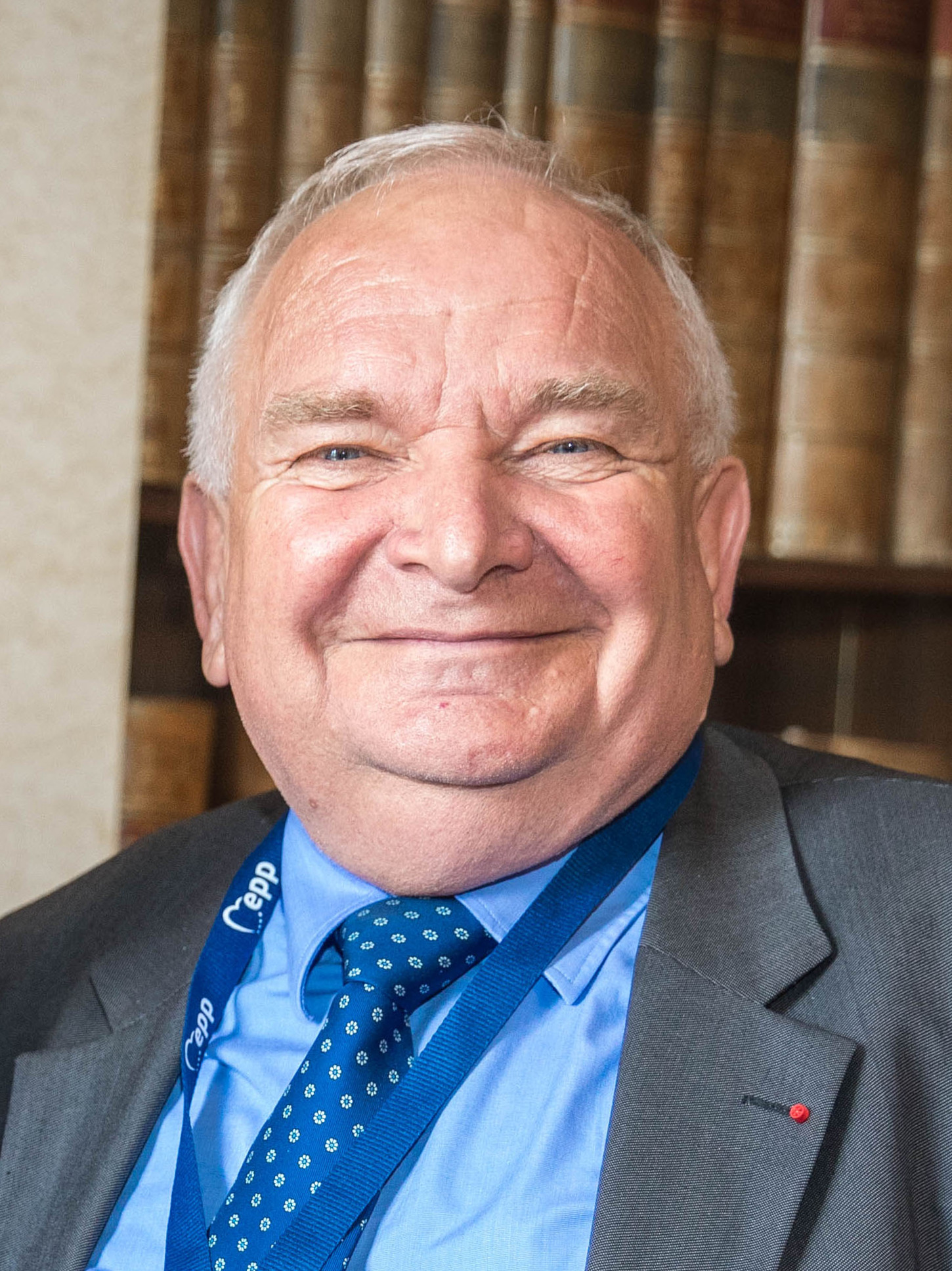
- Daul in 2019

President of the European People's Party
- In office 12 November 2013 – 30 November 2019
- Preceded by: Wilfried Martens
- Succeeded by: Donald Tusk

Leader of the European People's Party in the European Parliament
- In office 9 January 2007 – 4 June 2014
- President: Wilfried Martens
- Preceded by: Hans-Gert Pöttering
- Succeeded by: Manfred Weber

Member of the European Parliament
- In office 1 July 1999 – 20 May 2014
- Constituency: East France

Personal details
- Born: Joseph Alexander Daul; 13 April 1947 (age 79) Strasbourg, France
- Party: The Republicans
- Other political affiliations: European People's Party
- Education: Institute of Advanced Studies in National Defence
- Website: Official website

Joseph Alexander Daul (born 13 April 1947) is a French politician who served as President of the European People's Party (EPP) from 2013 to 2019. He previously served as Leader of the EPP Group in the European Parliament from 2007 to 2014 and a Member of the European Parliament (MEP) from France from 1999 until 2014. He is a member of The Republicans, part of the EPP.

Daul had previously come to prominence as the chairman of the European Parliament's powerful Committee on Agriculture, a position he was elected to on 23 July 2004, and previously, from 2002, as chairman of the Conference of Committee Chairmen. He has been mayor of Pfettisheim (Bas-Rhin) since 1989, and is an officer of the Agricultural Order of Merit, knight of the National Order of Merit and knight of the Legion of Honour. In addition to French, he speaks standard German and Alsatian, the Alemannic variety of German spoken in his native Alsace.

== Early life ==
Joseph Alexander Daul was born on 13 April 1947. He comes from a large family (six brothers and sisters) and at the age of 20 he took over a small family farm of 7 which he has since managed with his wife and, for the last few years, his son. While the operation has grown to 75 ha, it is still family-run and specialises in beef production and the cultivation of sugar beet.

== Career in national politics ==
Daul became active in the agricultural trade union movement, through the Centre National des Jeunes Agriculteurs (CNJA – National Centre for Young Farmers). He completed his professional training and general education and in 1976 he was appointed national Vice-Chairman of the CNJA with responsibility for European affairs. Daul also became a member of the Committee of Professional Agricultural Organisations (COPA) and of the European Economic and Social Committee in Brussels.

At the age of 35 he continued his trade union activities beyond the youth sector and combined his professional life as a farmer with positions of responsibility at a regional, (professional organisations, cooperatives, Chamber of Agriculture), national and European levels.

In 1997, when the 'mad cow' crisis arose, he was chair of the National Federation of Beef Producers in France and of the 'beef' group in Europe. These activities, together with his experience as mayor of his town (1000 inhabitants) led to a more active role in politics when, in 1999, he was asked to represent the farming and rural communities on the RPR list under Nicolas Sarkozy. Daul also became deputy mayor in his home town, vice-president of the Community of Councils and chairman of the Strasbourg Abattoir Management Cooperative (160 employees).

== Member of the European Parliament ==
After having been elected in 1999, Daul joined the then EPP-ED Group, now EPP Group. Daul became a member of the Committee on Agriculture and Rural Development, appointed chairman in January 2002.

In 2002, Daul was appointed chairman of the Conference of Committee Chairmen, which is responsible for co-ordinating 'horizontal' issues affecting the 20 parliamentary committees and for preparing the draft agenda for the plenary part-sessions. As part of the reform of the European Parliament, the Conference put forward proposals for making its work more efficient. Daul also co-chaired, together with the committee chairmen concerned, the hearings of the Commissioners and transmitted the conclusions to the President of the European Parliament.

Daul was under investigation for misuse of public funds in France. He was part of an inquiry into the diversion of €16 million (£10.6 million) of agricultural money in the 1990s that has also ensnared three former agriculture ministers. He was placed under investigation in 2004 for allegedly diverting money to finance the farmers' union, the FNSEA, and to pay his own staff. He was not accused of benefiting personally but of "complicity and concealment of the abuse of public funds". On 8 August 2007, the court had, however, asked that all charges against him be dropped, stating that the cases made against him did not require legal punishment.

In 2005 and 2006, he and Socialist MEP Richard Corbett were Parliament's representatives for a new round of negotiations with the Council and Commission on comitology, giving Parliament, for the first time, the right to block the adoption of Commission implementing measures.

The 'Lisbon Strategy' Group headed by Daul explored questions of employment and in this capacity Daul co-chaired two meetings in 2005 and 2006 between the European Parliament and the national parliaments. As a member of the European Parliament Delegation for the WTO negotiations, Daul formed part of the European Parliament delegation to the ministerial conferences in Seattle (1999), Doha (2001) and Cancun (2003). He was involved in the preparatory work for the ministerial conferences by regularly meeting ambassadors in Geneva to represent the position of the European Parliament.

In January 2007, he was elected chairman of the EPP Group. He remains member of the Committee on Agriculture and Rural Development and substitute member of the Committee on International Trade and of the Delegation to the ACP-EU Joint Parliamentary Assembly. He is also chairman of the European Parliamentary Association (EPA).

On 12 November 2013, Daul was elected president of the European People's Party, succeeding the late Wilfried Martens, while also remaining chairman of the EPP Group in the European Parliament. However, he decided not to run again in the European elections in 2014 and to leave his position as Chairman of the EPP Group in the European Parliament to dedicate all his time to his new function. He was re-elected as President of the EPP at the Madrid Congress in October 2015. In 2019, he was succeeded by Donald Tusk.

== Recognition ==
Among other honours, Daul is an "Officier de la Légion d'Honneur", "Chevalier de l'Ordre National du Mérite" and "Officier du Mérite Agricole".

Party political offices
Preceded by Hans-Gert Pöttering	Leader of the European People's Party in the European Parliament; 2007–2014	Succeeded by Manfred Weber
Preceded by Wilfried Martens	President of the European People's Party; 2013–2019	Succeeded by Donald Tusk
