= Aymeric Chauprade =

French political scientist and politician (born 1969)

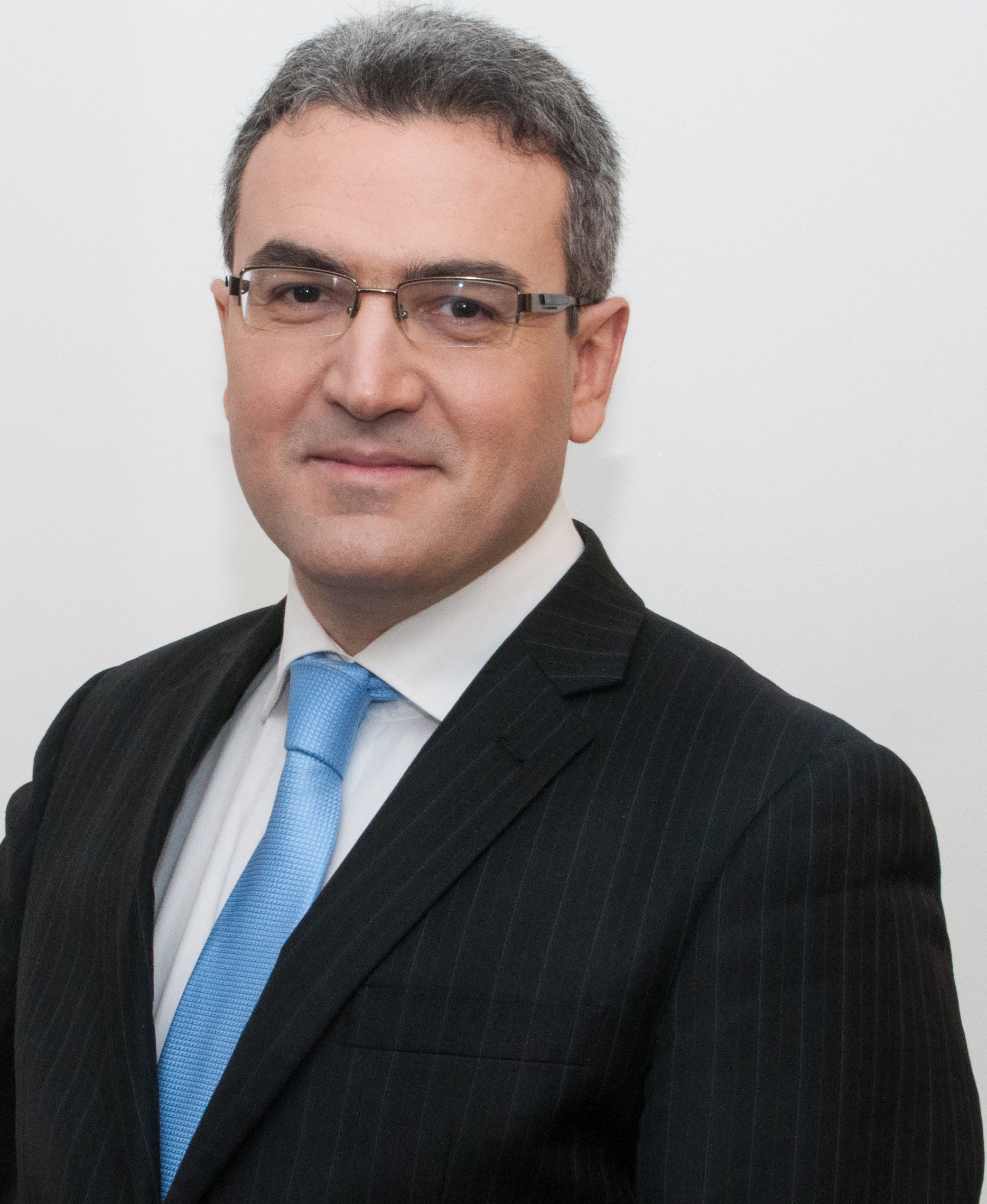
- Chauprade in 2014

Member of the European Parliament
- In office 1 July 2014 – 1 July 2019
- Constituency: Île-de-France

Personal details
- Born: 13 January 1969 (age 57) La Ferté-Bernard, France
- Party: National Front (2013-2015); LFL (from 2016)
- Education: Sciences Po; Paris Descartes University
- Occupation: author; international consultant; lawyer
- Scientific career
- Education: Institute of Political Studies (Paris)
- Known for: Geopolitics, constants and changes in history, Chronicle of the clash of civilizations
- Fields: Political science, Geopolitics, Geohistory

Aymeric Chauprade (born 13 January 1969) is a French writer, political scientist and politician. He left the National Front on 9 November 2015, mostly for "moral and political" principles, to found Les Français Libres. A student and disciple of François Thual, he is an advocate of realpolitik. He was elected to the European Parliament from the National Front for the Île-de-France constituency in the 2014 European Parliament election.

== Biography ==
=== Career ===
Graduating from the Paris Institute of Political Studies in 1993, Chauprade received a Master of International Law degree in 1996 and a doctorate in political science in 2001 from Paris Descartes University. Trained in mathematics, he is a lecturer in geopolitics at the Royal College of Higher Military Education of the Kingdom of Morocco, director of the Revue française de géopolitique (French Review of Geopolitics) and editor of several collections published by Ellipses in Paris (Grands enjeux, Taupe-Niveau and Référence géopolitique). From 2003 to 2009, Chauprade was a lecturer on the history of political ideas at the University of Neuchâtel in Switzerland. He has taught at the Collège interarmées de défense (CID: French Joint Defense College) since 1999, where he oversees geopolitics courses.

Chauprade is a contributor to African historian Bernard Lugan's magazine, L'Afrique réelle (Real Africa), works for Dominique Venner's La Nouvelle Revue d'Histoire. He dedicated his book, Géopolitique, constantes et changements dans l'histoire (Geopolitics, Constants and Changes in History) to the students at CID. Chauprade is an officer in the French Naval Reserve.

After the publication of his book, Chronique du choc des civilisations ("Chronicle of the Clash of Civilizations" reedited in 2015), Chauprade was accused by French journalist Jean Guisnel of espousing September 11 conspiracy theories. He disputed the allegations. Chauprade was removed from his chair at the CID by Supervising Minister Hervé Morin in early February 2009.

During the controversy, Chauprade (who filed a complaint against the Minister and the magazine Le Point) received support from CID students and his former university professor Edmond Jouve. Although CID head Vincent Desportes expressed reservations about Chauprade's writings, Desportes said: "He has never proselytized in his courses or expressed his vision of the world".

A website supporting Chauprade was set up. On 24 March 2009 the Paris Administrative Court ruled in his favour, suspending Morin's decision and saying that the minister had violated a "fundamental freedom". On 1 June 2011 the court upheld its ruling, saying that Morin's decision resulted "from an irregular procedure".

Chauprade organized a conference with Jacques Frémeaux and Philippe Evanno in February 2013 at the Sorbonne (University of Paris IV) on threats in North Africa and the Sahel and Europe's overall security (Menaces en Afrique du Nord et au Sahel et sécurité globale de l'Europe), the proceedings of which were published in April 2013 by Ellipses Editions. Since January 2010, he has funded a geopolitical website. He is recognized as one of 100 most important international authors in geopolitics and International relations("Les grands théoriciens des relations intérnationales" 2015, Studyrama).

The daughter of the spokesperson of Vladimir Putin, Dmitry Peskov, Elizaveta Peskova, is an assistant to him in the European Parliament.

=== Geopolitics ===
According to Chauprade, he follows a new French geopolitical school emphasizing realpolitik and deemphasizing ideology. Its ideas appear in the Revue française de géopolitique (French Review of Geopolitics) and the International Academy of Geopolitics, of which Chauprade is secretary-general. His geopolitical philosophy follows that of François Thual, and can be found in the introduction to Géopolitique, constantes et changements dans l'histoire. Chauprade maintains strong relations with Morocco (where he teaches), and travels regularly to the Middle East, Central Europe, Central Asia, Russia and China.

=== Civilisations ===
According to Jean-Marc Huissoud, Chauprade is considered a founder of the new French geopolitics, describing the "continuous and discontinuous" in his analysis of international questions. Chauprade has said, "France is at war against some Muslims, not at war with the Muslims but with some Muslims". In his interview for ITélé he said that France is better than a race, it's a civilization. Chauprade defends Judeo-Christian roots of Europe.

=== Politics ===
Chauprade supported the list headed by Philippe de Villiers in the 2004 European Parliament election. Chauprade should be the National Front's top candidate in the Île-de-France district for the 2014 European elections and Le Pen's advisor on foreign-policy issues.

In an interview with the French bi-monthly magazine L'Homme nouveau on 27 November 2013, he said that the "ideological bipolarity" separating the world is no longer the one opposing liberalism and communism (which are "two materialisms") but the one opposing "materialism and traditionalism": "On one side are those who believe that the individual is the supreme value, on the other are those who think that transcendence or the common good are superior to the human person". Chauprade's "commitment is clearly in the second camp," and he intends "to participate in a project that not only raises the issue of identity in France, but also raises the problem of materialism and rehabilitates transcendence in politics".

Chauprade defends the multipolar vision of politics which includes peaceful relations with Russia and the USA. He travelled to Crimea to "monitor" the Crimean status referendum, having been invited by the far-right Eurasian Observatory for Democracy & Elections (EODE) according to La Libération He was personally commenting the events live on Russia Today on 16 March.

In his ITélé interview of 9 November 2015 Chauprade appealed for the return of Philippe de Villiers and showed a strong desire of work by his side.

=== Quitting National Front ===
On 9 November 2015, he announces quitting the National Front for "moral and ideological issues". Like some other members, he deplores the influence of Florian Philippot on Marine Le Pen and the party's political path.

He also stated that Alain Soral's anti-Semitic influence on a part of the party is one of the main reasons that made him quit the National Front. He stands for a right-wing recomposition.

On her side, Marine Le Pen claimed that "after the Air Cocaine gate, our disagreements with Aymeric Chauprade became too important for him to stay at the National Front". At the European Parliament, he quit the Europe of Nations and Freedom group (ENL), which he joined at its creation, and became an independent MEP.

On 13 January 2016 he announced the creation of his own party, Les Français Libres, with the purpose of "unifying a credible and assumed right wing". He refused to make a choice during 2017's French presidential election between "globalised socialism and a nationalist socialism".

In April 2016, he admitted to being closer to Les Républicains and wishes to "take part in an eventual government from the right wing" without taking part in the election of Les Républicains' candidate to run for office. At the European Parliament he tried to join the French delegation of the European Popular Party, and Valeurs actuelles stated that "even benefiting from Michele Alliot-Marie's, Nadine Morano's and Brice Hortefeux’s support, he faces oppositions from juppeists".

During the election of Les Républicains' candidate to run for office, he supported Nicolas Sarkozy for the first round and Francois Fillon for the second round.

During the 2017 presidential election, he supported Fillon for the first round before supporting Emmanuel Macron in the second round.

On 16 March 2017, he expressed himself for one of the first times on the "shadow men" around the National Front in an Envoyé Special documentary. According to him, "Marine Le Pen is not free, she is held by those people (Frédéric Chatillon, Axel Loustau et Philippe Péninque). If she comes to power, those people will too. There is no reason for this group to disappear. It will become the group that brought her to power. It is the National Front economy. They are Marine Le Pen's secret".

When Macron visited the European Parliament on 17 April 2018, Chauprade congratulated him on his courage to initiate reforms. He joined the Europe of Freedom and Direct Democracy (EFDD) group, where he became vice-president. It is a sovereignist sensitivity group that includes the Five-Star Movement of Italy and UKIP of Britain.

== "Air Cocaine" affair ==
On 20 March 2013, two French pilots were arrested at the Punta Cana airport in the Dominican Republic with suitcases filled with cocaine. Their flight was registered as commercial and the baggage was checked by airport security. According to the Civil Aviation Law, airplane crews are not responsible for luggage content. However, the two pilots of the plane were arrested, with no distinction being made between them and the passengers by the Dominican police.

A support committee of Air France pilots and former French air force pilots was formed. In autumn 2014, Chauprade joined the support committee.

On 15 May 2015, Chauprade posted a video denouncing a justice denial made by the Dominican Republic. For a year and a half, the four Frenchmen had their trial reported more than 30 times without a way to defend themselves.

In August 2015, at the end of the trial, the 30 Dominican defendants were acquitted, and the four Frenchmen were declared guilty and sentenced to 20 years of prison. The pilots appealed and remained free under surveillance. In October, they were extracted. Chauprade's role in the operation was unclear.

After extraction of the two pilots, international arrest warrants were issued by the Dominican Republic against Chauprade, Christophe Naudin, and Pierre Malinowski for "people smuggling and trafficking in human beings". In June 2018, Chauprade was informed by Interpol that he had no investigation opened against him.

== Works ==
- L'espace économique francophone (Francophone (French-speaking) economic area), Paris, Ellipses, 1996.
- Histoires d'Égypte (Histories of Egypt), Paris, Les Belles Lettres, 1996
- Beyrouth éternelle (Eternal Beirut), Paris, Asa Éditions, 1998 (translated in Arabic and English)
- Dictionnaire de géopolitique (Dictionary of geopolitics) with François Thual, Paris, Ellipses, 2nd edition, 1999
- Introduction à l'analyse géopolitique (Introduction to geopolitical analysis), Paris, Ellipses, 1999
- Les Balkans, la Guerre du Kosovo (en collaboration) (The Balkans, the Kosovo War (in collaboration)), Paris/Lausanne, L'Âge d'Homme, 2000
- Géopolitique des États-Unis (culture, intérêts, stratégies) (Geopolitics of the United States (culture, interests, strategies)), Paris, Ellipses, 2003
- Une nouvelle géopolitique du pétrole en Afrique (A new geopolitics of oil in Africa)
- Géopolitique – Constantes et changements dans l'histoire (Geopolitics, constants and changes in history), Paris, Ellipses, 3rd edition 2007
- Chronique du choc des civilisations (Chronicle of the Clash of Civilizations), Éditions Chronique, January 2009
- L'Iran réel (The real Iran), Paris, Ellipses 2009 (under the direction of Aymeric Chauprade)
- Chronique du choc des civilisations (Chronicle of the Clash of Civilizations), éditions Chronique, September 2011 (2nd edition completely revised and expanded)
- Menaces en Afrique du Nord et au Sahel et sécurité globale de l'Europe (en collaboration avec Jacques Frémeaux et Philippe Evanno) (Threats in North Africa and in the Sahel and overall security of Europe), Ellipses, April 2013
- Chronique du choc des civilisations, éditions Chronique, September 2013 (3rd edition updated and expanded)
- Prévention des crises et promotion de la paix (Crisis Prevention and Peacebuilding), volume 3 (in collaboration), under the direction of Jean-Pierre Vettovaglia, preface by Abdou Diouf, éditions Emile Bruylant, October 2013

== Other publications ==
- L'immigration extra-européenne, un défi majeur pour l'Union européenne (Non-European Immigration, a major challenge for the European Union), study for the Thomas-More Institute, July 2006 read online
