= Île-de-France (European Parliament constituency) =

Former European Parliament constituency

- European Parliament constituency
- Location among the 2014 constituencies

- Shown within France
- Member state: France
- Created: 2004
- MEPs: 14

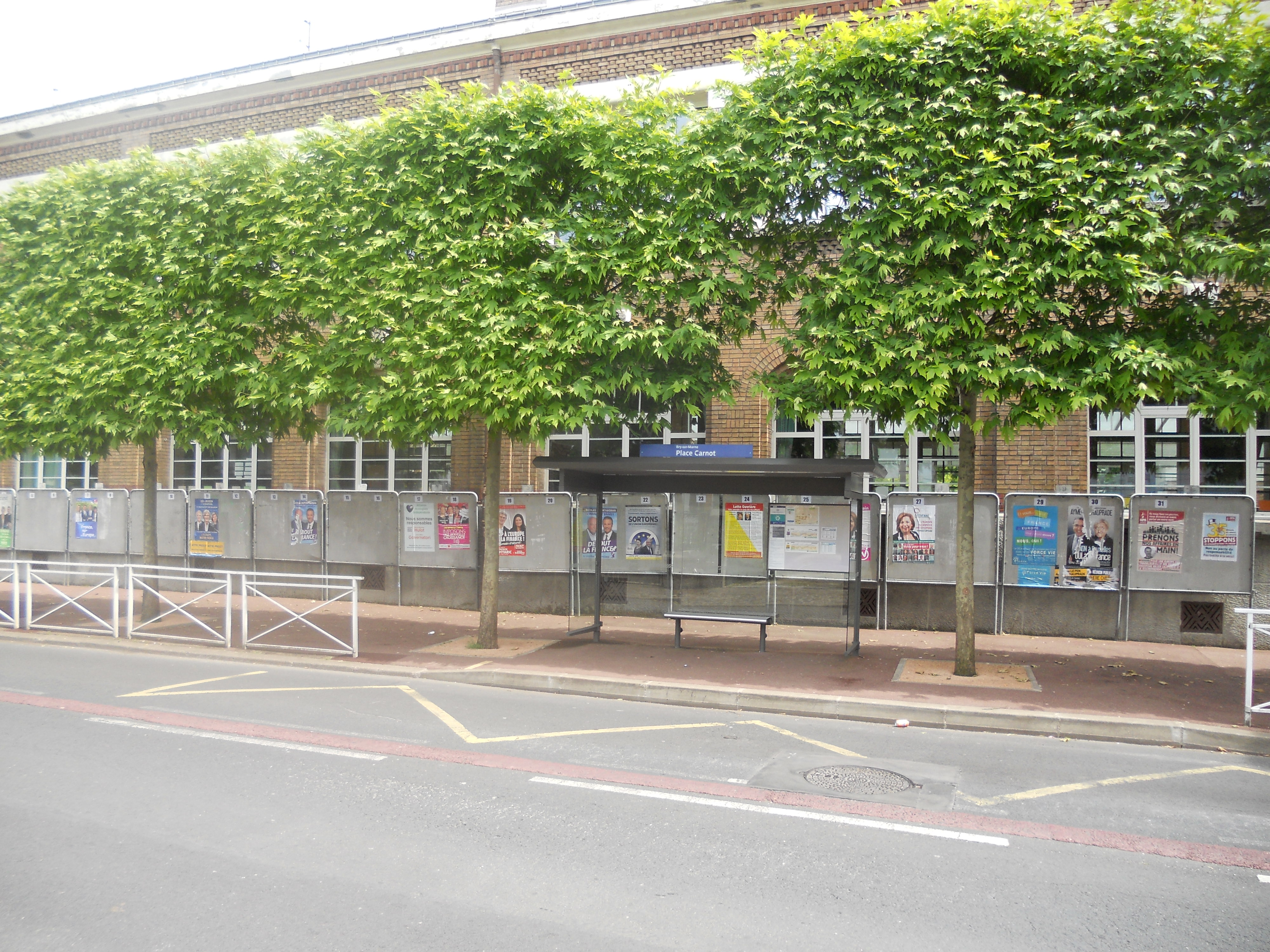
Election posters outside a polling station in the Île-de-France constituency during the 2014 European election.

For elections in the European Union between 2004 and 2019, Île-de-France was a European Parliament constituency. It consisted of the French region of Île-de-France. In 2009, it had 6,822,779 registered voters.

Starting from the 2014 European elections, French citizens living abroad (and not registered as electors for the European elections in another member state of the European Union) were also counted as voting in this constituency. In 2019, the constituency was abolished in favor of a single national vote.

== Members of the European Parliament ==
Election	MEP (party)	MEP (party)	MEP (party)	MEP (party)	MEP (party)	MEP (party)	MEP (party)	MEP (party)	MEP (party)	MEP (party)	MEP (party)	MEP (party)	MEP (party)	MEP (party)
2004	Francis Wurtz (PCF)	Pervenche Berès (PS)	Harlem Désir (PS)	Anne Ferreira (PS)	Gilles Savary (PS)	Pierre Schapira (PS)	Alain Lipietz (Green)	Bernard Lehideux (UDF)	Marielle de Sarnez (UDF)	Nicole Fontaine (UMP)	Patrick Gaubert (UMP)	Jacques Toubon (UMP)	Paul-Marie Coûteaux (MPF)	Marine Le Pen (FN)
2009	Patrick Le Hyaric (FG)	Pervenche Berès (PS)	Harlem Désir (PS)	Eva Joly (EELV)	Pascal Canfin (EELV)	Karima Delli (EELV)	Daniel Cohn-Bendit (EELV)	Marielle Gallo (LGM)	Marielle de Sarnez (MoDem)	Rachida Dati (UMP /LR)	Philippe Juvin (UMP /LR)	Constance Le Grip (UMP)	Jean-Marie Cavada (LC/ Génération Citoyens)	13 seats
2014	Patrick Le Hyaric (FG)	Pervenche Berès (PS)	Christine Revault d'Allonnes-Bonnefoy (PS)	Eva Joly (EELV)	Pascal Durand (EELV)	Guillaume Balas (PS/ Génération.s)	Marie-Christine Boutonnet (FN)	Jean-Luc Schaffhauser (FN)	Marielle de Sarnez (MoDem)	Rachida Dati (UMP /LR)	Philippe Juvin (UMP /LR)	Constance Le Grip (UMP /LR)	Jean-Marie Cavada (LC/ Génération Citoyens)	Aymeric Chauprade (FN/ Ind.)
2015	Patrick Le Hyaric (FG)	Pervenche Berès (PS)	Christine Revault d'Allonnes-Bonnefoy (PS)	Eva Joly (EELV)	Pascal Durand (EELV)	Guillaume Balas (PS/ Génération.s)	Marie-Christine Boutonnet (FN)	Jean-Luc Schaffhauser (FN)	Marielle de Sarnez (MoDem)	Rachida Dati (UMP /LR)	Philippe Juvin (UMP /LR)	Constance Le Grip (UMP /LR)	Jean-Marie Cavada (LC/ Génération Citoyens)	Aymeric Chauprade (FN/ Ind.)
2016	Patrick Le Hyaric (FG)	Pervenche Berès (PS)	Christine Revault d'Allonnes-Bonnefoy (PS)	Eva Joly (EELV)	Pascal Durand (EELV)	Guillaume Balas (PS/ Génération.s)	Marie-Christine Boutonnet (FN)	Jean-Luc Schaffhauser (FN)	Marielle de Sarnez (MoDem)	Rachida Dati (UMP /LR)	Philippe Juvin (UMP /LR)	Constance Le Grip (UMP /LR)	Jean-Marie Cavada (LC/ Génération Citoyens)	Aymeric Chauprade (FN/ Ind.)
2017	Patrick Le Hyaric (FG)	Pervenche Berès (PS)	Christine Revault d'Allonnes-Bonnefoy (PS)	Eva Joly (EELV)	Pascal Durand (EELV)	Guillaume Balas (PS/ Génération.s)	Marie-Christine Boutonnet (FN)	Jean-Luc Schaffhauser (FN)	Patricia Lalonde (UDI)	Rachida Dati (UMP /LR)	Philippe Juvin (UMP /LR)	Geoffroy Didier; LR)	Jean-Marie Cavada (LC/ Génération Citoyens)	Aymeric Chauprade (FN/ Ind.)
2018	Patrick Le Hyaric (FG)	Pervenche Berès (PS)	Christine Revault d'Allonnes-Bonnefoy (PS)	Eva Joly (EELV)	Pascal Durand (EELV)	Guillaume Balas (PS/ Génération.s)	Marie-Christine Boutonnet (FN)	Jean-Luc Schaffhauser (FN)	Patricia Lalonde (UDI)	Rachida Dati (UMP /LR)	Philippe Juvin (UMP /LR)	Geoffroy Didier; LR)	Jean-Marie Cavada (LC/ Génération Citoyens)	Aymeric Chauprade (FN/ Ind.)

== Results ==
=== 2009 ===
European Election 2009: Île-de-France
List	Candidates	Votes	Of total (%)	± from prev.
UMP	Michel Barnier Rachida Dati Jean-Marie Cavada Marielle Gallo Philippe Juvin	828,172	29.60	
EELV	Daniel Cohn-Bendit Eva Joly Pascal Canfin Karima Delli	583,690	20.86	
PS	Harlem Désir Pervenche Berès	379,908	13.57	
MoDem	Marielle de Sarnez	238,341	8.52	
FG	Patrick Le Hyaric	176,862	6.32	
FN	None	123,199	4.40	
NPA	None	97,454	3.48	
Libertas	None	91,814	3.28	
AEI	None	83,009	2.97	
DLR	None	68,333	2.44	
Anti-Zionist List	None	36,374	1.30	
La Terre Sinon Rien	None	28,768	1.03	
LO	None	20,748	0.74	
CNIP	None	11,700	0.42	
Pour une France et une Europe plus fraternelles	None	6,529	0.23	
Solidarité – Liberté, Justice et Paix	None	4,386	0.16	
Cannabis Sans Frontière	None	4,015	0.14	
Eŭropo Demokratio Esperanto	None	3,294	0.12	
Liberal Alternative	None	2,792	0.10	
Citoyenneté Culture Européennes	None	1,758	0.06	
AR	None	1,317	0.05	
Europe de Gibraltar à Jérusalem	None	1,197	0.04	
Newropeans	None	1,058	0.04	
Communistes	None	1,050	0.04	
Europe décroissance	None	1,015	0.04	
Union des gens	None	755	0.03	
Humanist Party	None	582	0.02	
Turnout		2,870,076	42.06	

=== 2004 ===
Brackets indicate the number of votes per seat won.

European Election 2004: Île-de-France
List	Candidates	Votes	Of total (%)	± from prev.
PS	Pervenche Berès Harlem Désir Anne Ferreira Gilles Savary Pierre Schapira	685,193 (137,038.6)	25.03	
UMP	Nicole Fontaine Patrick Gaubert Jacques Toubon	487,186 (162,395.33)	17.80	
UDF	Marielle de Sarnez Bernard Lehideux	345,700 (172,850)	12.63	
FN	Marine Le Pen	234,893	8.58	
LV	Alain Lipietz	205,480	7.51	
MPF	Paul-Marie Coûteaux	166,573	6.08	
PCF	Francis Wurtz	165,311	6.04	
DVE	None	98,700	3.61	
RPF	None	82,282	3.01	
Far left	None	76,110	2.78	
Euro-Palestine	None	50,037	1.83	
PRG	None	42,240	1.58	
La France d'en bas	None	35,177	1.29	
Rassemblement des Contribuables Français	None	16,885	0.62	
Workers' Party	None	14,088	0.51	
MNR	None	7,705	0.28	
La terre, sinon rien	None	6,222	0.23	
Eŭropo Demokratio Esperanto	None	5,765	0.21	
Nouvelle Solidarité	None	3,129	0.11	
Vivre mieux avec l'Europe	None	2,957	0.11	
Diversité pour l'Europe	None	1,476	0.05	
AR	None	1,290	0.05	
Nous sommes tous européens	None	1,210	0.04	
Union Française pour la Cohésion Nationale	None	865	0.03	
Parti Fédéraliste	None	528	0.02	
Action pour tous	None	358	0.01	
Parti Humaniste	None	100	0.00	
Parti des Socioprofessionnels	None	48	0.00	
Turnout		2,737,509	45.07	
