= Pierre Schapira =

Pierre Schapira may refer to:

- Pierre Schapira (politician)
- Pierre Schapira (mathematician)
