= Jean-Luc Schaffhauser =

French politician (born 1955)

Jean-Luc Schaffhauser MEP
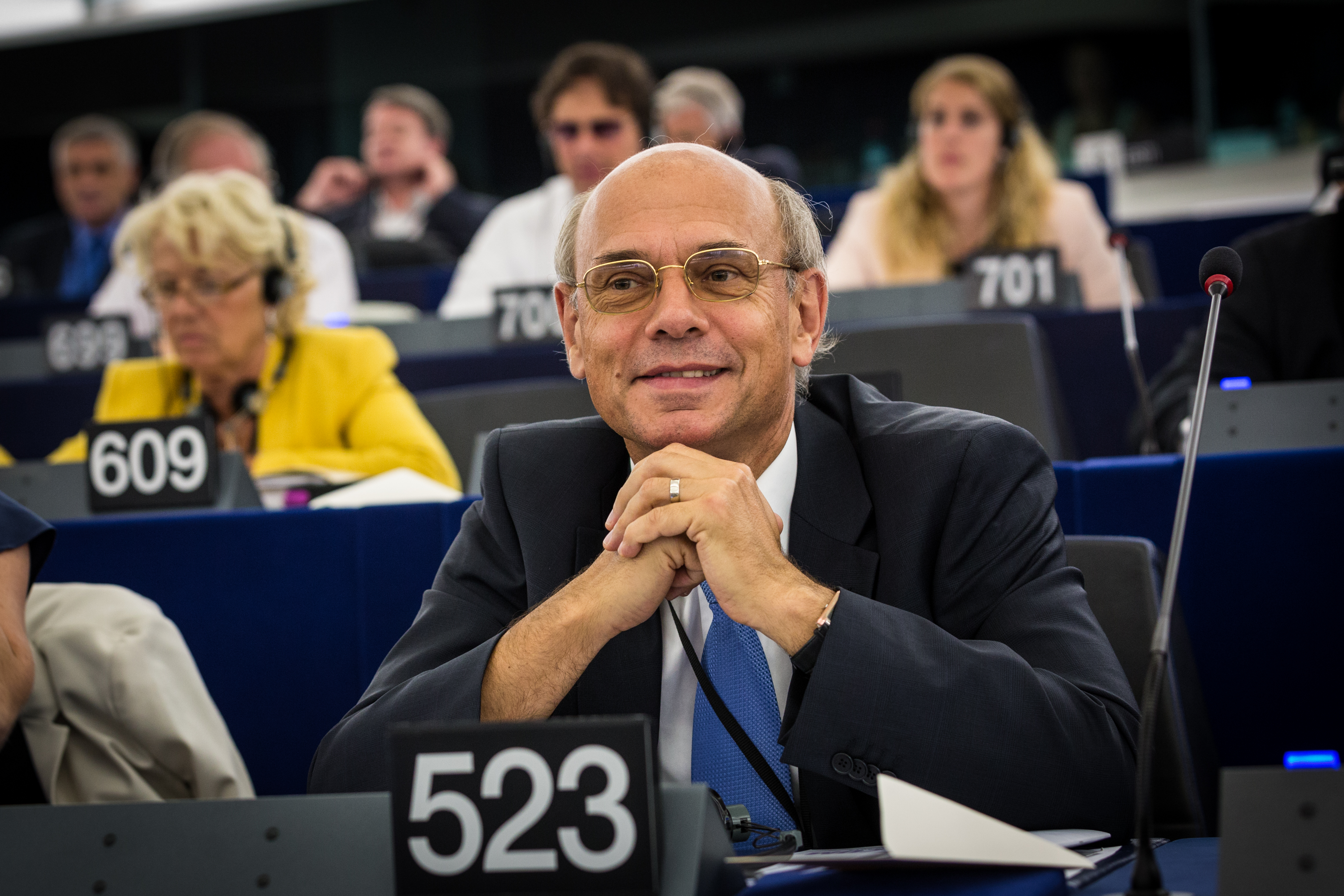

Member of the European Parliament for Île-de-France
- In office 1 July 2014 – 2019

Personal details
- Born: 17 December 1955 (age 70) Cambrai, France
- Party: National Front

Jean-Luc Schaffhauser (born 17 December 1955) is a French politician who was a National Front Member of the European Parliament from 2014 to 2019 representing Île-de-France.
