= Ismail Ertug =

German politician (born 1975)

Ismail Ertug MEP
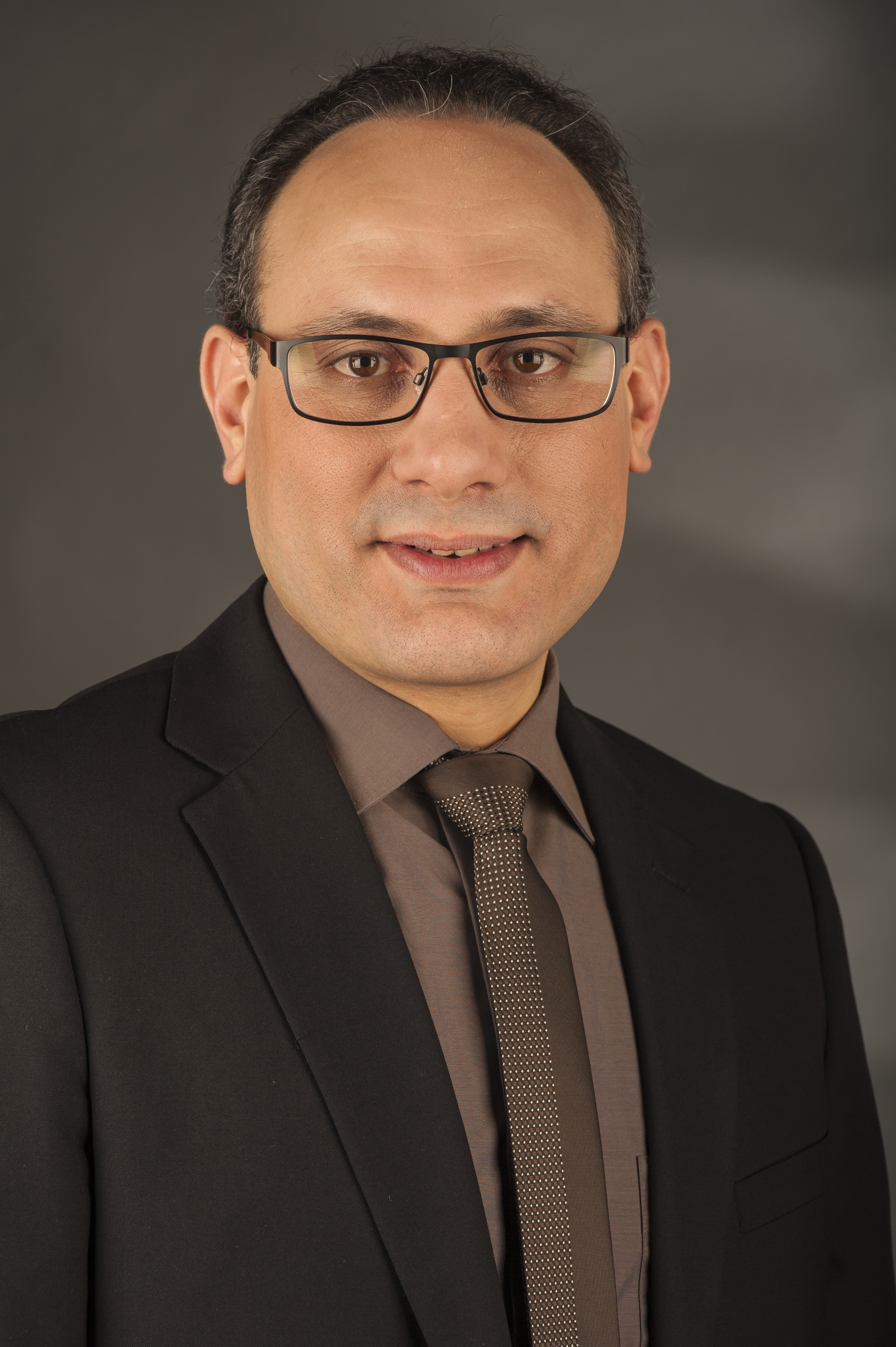
- Ismail Ertug in 2014

Member of the European Parliament
- In office 4 July 2009 – 2 July 2023
- Succeeded by: Thomas Rudner
- Constituency: Germany

Personal details
- Born: 5 December 1975 (age 50) Amberg, Germany
- Party: German; Social Democratic Party; EU; Party of European Socialists
- Website: www.ertug.eu

Ismail Ertug (Turkish: İsmail Ertuğ; born 5 December 1975) is a German politician who served as a Member of the European Parliament (MEP) from Germany from 2009 to 2023. He is a member of the Social Democratic Party of Germany, part of the Party of European Socialists.

== Early life and career ==
Of ethnic Turkish origin, Ertug was born in Amberg, in 1975, three years after his parents immigrated from Seferihisar (in İzmir, Turkey) to Germany. After finishing his apprenticeship as industrial management assistant, he worked as a customer consultant for enterprises at the German general health insurance (AOK) where he studied business management. Following his studies, he worked as coordinator and social insurance expert in the marketing department of the AOK Bavaria.

== Political career ==
=== Career in local politics ===
Since 1999, Ertug has been a member of the Social Democratic Party of Germany (SPD). He was a member of the Amberg City Council from 2004 to 2009 and again since 2014. Furthermore, Ertug is an assessor of the board of the Bavarian SPD, under the leadership of chairwoman Natascha Kohnen.

=== Member of the European Parliament, 2009–present ===
In the 2009 European elections, Ertug was first elected as a Member of the European Parliament (MEP) for the German Social Democrats. He was re-elected in 2014. Ertug represents the Bavarian regions of Upper Palatinate and Lower Bavaria. In the European Parliament, Ertug is a member of the Committee for Transport and Tourism (TRAN) and since 2014, he is coordinator of the Group of Socialists and Democrats in the TRAN committee. In this capacity, he has served as the Parliament's rapporteur on Trans-European Transport Networks (TENT-N) and the 2019 Mobility Package. From January 2016 until 2017, he was a full member of the Committee of Inquiry into Emission Measurements in the Automotive Sector (EMIS) that submitted/presented their conclusions in March 2017.

Ertug is further a substitute member of the Committee on the Environment, Public Health and Food Safety (ENVI). Additionally, he is a member of the delegations to the EU-Kazakhstan, EU-Kyrgyzstan, EU-Tajikistan and EU-Uzbekistan Parliamentary Cooperation Committees; of the delegation for relations with Turkmenistan and Mongolia (DCAS); and of the European Parliament Intergroup on Sports. He is also a substitute member of the Delegation for the relations between the EU and the nations of Southeast Asia together with the association of Southeast Asian states as well as of the Delegation to the ACP–EU Joint Parliamentary Assembly.

In addition to his legislative work in the committees and the work in the delegations, Ertug co-chairs the EP Turkey Forum, a cross-party group of more than 70 MEPs. Their aim is to closely monitor the EU-Turkey accession negotiations as well as promote the Turkish-European relations through informatory events and cultural exchange. He is also part of the European Parliament Intergroup on Climate Change, Biodiversity and Sustainable Development.

== Other activities ==
- European Logistics Platform, Member of the Advisory Board
- German United Services Trade Union (ver.di), Member
- Greenpeace, Member
- German Worker's Welfare Association (AWO), Member
- Mobifair, Member
- Rail Forum Europe, Member

Ertug also supports “Gemeinsam leben und lernen in Europa e.V.” and the German coalition for action against racism, “Bunt statt braun”. Furthermore, he is a mentor of the program “school without racism” for the Franz-Xaver-von-Schönwerth middle school Amberg.

== Controversy ==
In a letter to President of the European Parliament David Sassoli in late 2019, Ertug and Karima Delli asked the Parliament to sanction Angel Dzhambazki on the grounds he made xenophobic remarks about them and thereby breached the legislature's code of conduct.
