= François Thual =

French geopolitical political scientist

François Thual (24 November 1944 — 21 June 2024) was a French geopolitical political scientist.

Thual died on 21 June 2024 at a hospital in Orange, Vaucluse.

== Publications ==
- Le Fait juif dans le monde : Géopolitique et démographie, Paris, Odile Jacob, 2010
- La bataille du Grand Nord a commencé... (with Richard Labévière), Paris, Perrin 2008
- Géopolitique d'Israël : Dictionnaire pour sortir des fantasmes (with Frédéric Encel), Paris, Seuil 2004/ Points Essais 2006.
- Abrégé géopolitique de l'Amérique latine, Paris, Ellipses, 2006.
- Géopolitique des religions. Le Dieu fragmenté, Paris, Ellipses, 2004.
- Géopolitique des Caucases, Paris, Ellipses, 2004.
- Services secrets et géopolitique (interviews with admiral Pierre Lacoste), Lavauzelle, 2004.
- La crise du Haut-Karabakh. Une citadelle assiégée ?, Paris, IRIS, 2003.
- Géopolitique du Bouddhisme, Éditions des Syrtes, 2002.
- La planète émiettée. Morceler et lotir, un nouvel art de dominer, Arléa, 2002.
- Le Caucase : Arménie, Azerbaïdjan, Daghestan, Géorgie, Tchétchénie , Paris, Flammarion, coll. Dominos, 2001.
- Contrôler et contrer. Stratégies géopolitiques, Paris, Ellipses, 2000.
- Bagdad 2000. L'avenir géopolitique de l'Irak (with André Dulait), Paris, Ellipses, 1999.
- Le désir de territoire. Morphogenèses territoriales et identités, Paris, Ellipses, 1999.
- Dictionnaire de géopolitique. États, concepts, auteurs (with Aymeric Chauprade), Paris, Ellipses, 1999.
- Les conflits identitaires, Paris, Ellipses, 1998.
- Le douaire de Byzance. Territoires et identités de l'orthodoxie, Paris, Ellipses, 1998.
- La nouvelle Caspienne. Les nouveaux enjeux post-soviétiques (with André Dulait), Paris, Ellipses, 1998.
- La Géopolitique (with Pascal Lorot), Paris, Monchrestien, Clefs, 1997.
- Repères internationaux. L'évènement au crible de la géopolitique. Paris, Ellipses, 1997.
- Abrégé géopolitique du Golfe, Paris, Ellipses, 1997.
- Méthodes de la géopolitique. Apprendre à déchiffrer l'actualité, Paris, Ellipses, 1996.
- Géopolitique de l'Amérique latine, Paris, Economica, 1996.
- Géopolitique du chiisme, Arléa, 1995, 2002.
- Repères géopolitiques, Paris, La documentation française, 1995.
- Géopolitique de la franc-maçonnerie, Paris, Dunod, 1994
- Géopolitique de l'orthodoxie, Dunod, 1993

Prefaces

- Preface of La France : une étrange faillite by Morad el Hattab, (Alpharès, 2014), ISBN 978-2-84839-017-8.
