= L'Humanité =

French leftist newspaper since 1904

- Front page of L'Humanité on 25 February 2010. Commenting on the Greek government-debt crisis, the headline reads "Greece doesn't want to pay rich people's bills".
- Type: Daily newspaper
- Format: Berliner
- Owner: L'Humanité
- Editor: Patrick Le Hyaric
- Founded: 1904; 122 years ago
- Political alignment: Left-wing
- Headquarters: Paris
- Country: France
- ISSN: 0242-6870
- Website: www.humanite.fr

L'Humanité (French pronunciation: [lymanite], lit. 'Humanity') is a leftist French daily newspaper, sometimes referred to by the shortened name L'Huma. It was previously a de facto organ of the SFIO, and thereafter of the French Communist Party (PCF), to which it still maintains links. Its slogan is "In an ideal world, L'Humanité would not exist."

== History and profile ==
=== Pre–World War II ===
L'Humanité was founded in 1904 by Jean Jaurès, leader of the French Socialist Party (PSF), which merged the following year into the French Section of the Workers' International (SFIO). Jaurès also edited the paper until his assassination on 31 July 1914. By that time, the newspaper's readership was estimated at 150,000.

When the SFIO split at the 1920 Tours Congress, the Communists took control of L'Humanité, which became the official organ of the French Communist Party (PCF), despite the newspaper's socialist origins, while the SFIO retained control of the minor daily Le Populaire. The PCF still owns 40% of L'Humanité with the remaining shares held by staff, readers and "friends" of the paper. The paper is also sustained by proceeds from the annual Fête de l'Humanité gathering in France.

The fortunes of L'Humanité have fluctuated with those of the PCF. During the 1920s, when the PCF was politically isolated, the paper was kept in existence only by donations from Party members.

Louis Aragon started to write for L'Humanité in 1933, in the "news in brief" section. He later led Les Lettres françaises, the paper's weekly literary supplement. With the formation of the Popular Front in 1936, L'Humanité's circulation and status increased, and many leading French intellectuals wrote for it. L'Humanité was banned during World War II but continued publication secretly until the liberation of Paris from German occupation in 1944.

=== After World War II ===
The paper's status was highest in the years after World War II, when the PCF was the dominant party of the French left and L'Humanité enjoyed a large circulation. After the death of Joseph Stalin in 1953, the paper appeared with a black margin mourning the Soviet dictator. Since the 1980s, however, the PCF has been in decline, mostly due to the rise of the Socialist Party, which took over large sections of PCF support; circulation and economic viability of L'Humanité have declined as well.

Until 1990 the PCF and L'Humanité received regular subsidies from the Soviet Union. According to the French authors Victor Loupan (fr) and Pierre Lorrain (fr), L'Humanité received free newsprint from Soviet sources.

=== Post–Soviet Union ===
The fall of the Soviet Union and the continued decline of the PCF's electoral base produced a crisis for L'Humanité. Its circulation, more than 500,000 after the war, slumped to under 70,000. In 2001, after a decade of financial decline, the PCF sold 20% of the paper to a group of private investors led by the TV channel TF1 (part of the Bouygues group), and which included Hachette (Lagardère Group). TF1 said its motive was to preserve media diversity. Despite the irony of a communist newspaper being rescued by private capital—some of which supported right-wing politics—L'Humanité director Patrick Le Hyaric described the sale as a "life or death" decision to avert insolvency.

=== After 2001 ===
In 2006, the paper created a weekly edition, L'Humanité Dimanche. That same year, L'Humanité had a circulation of 52,800 copies. In 2007, the paper initiated a sale of its headquarters for €15 million, but in the summer of 2008 the sale collapsed, leaving L'Humanité in dire financial straits. It made an urgent appeal to readers for donations and/or loans, which ended up raising more than €2 million by the end of the year. The headquarters was eventually sold in 2010 for €12 million.

By the early 2020s, L'Humanité settled into a more sustainable financial model, with a paid circulation of nearly 40,000:

Newspaper circulation
Year	Print run	Paid distribution (France and abroad)	Total distribution (including free copies)
2011	64,264	45,938	48,878
2012	63,578	43,627	46,930
2013	57,712	40,669	43,744
2014	55,395	38,295	40,674
2015	52,789	37,037	39,384
2016	49,586	35,938	38,263
2017	47,152	33,974	36,132
2018	45,563	32,017	34,565
2019	41,010	36,347	38,941
2020	38,480	37,687	39,538
2021	35,592	38,518	40,245
2022	36,824	37,094	38,841
2023	35,868	35,993	38,032
2024	36,307	38,006	39,810
2025	30,670	39,832	41,580

== Fête de l'Humanité ==
The newspaper organizes the annual Fête de l'Humanité festival as a fundraising event.

== See also ==
- History of French journalism
