= 2014 Crimean status referendum =

Disputed referendum on decision whether to join Russia or remain in Ukraine

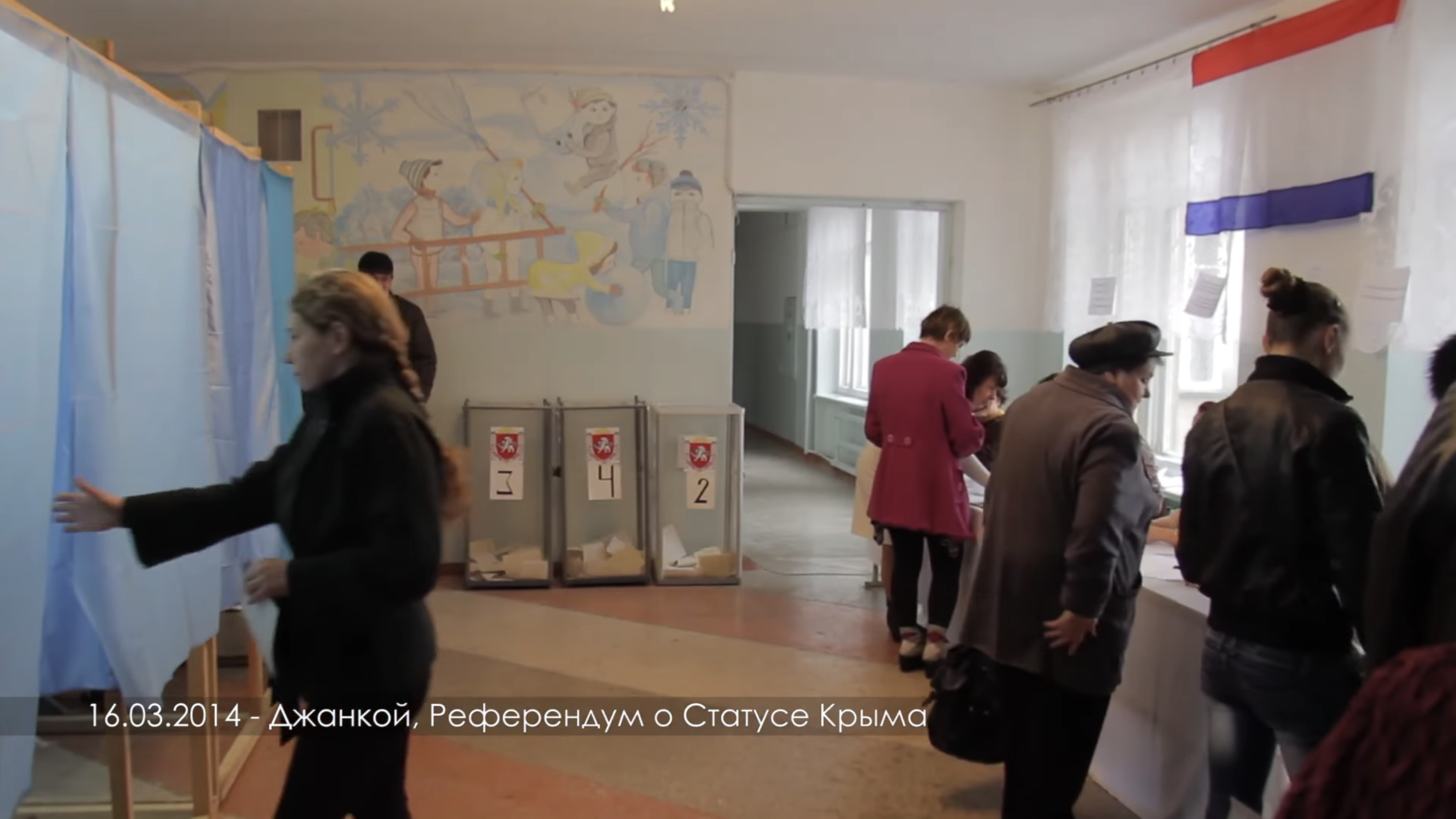
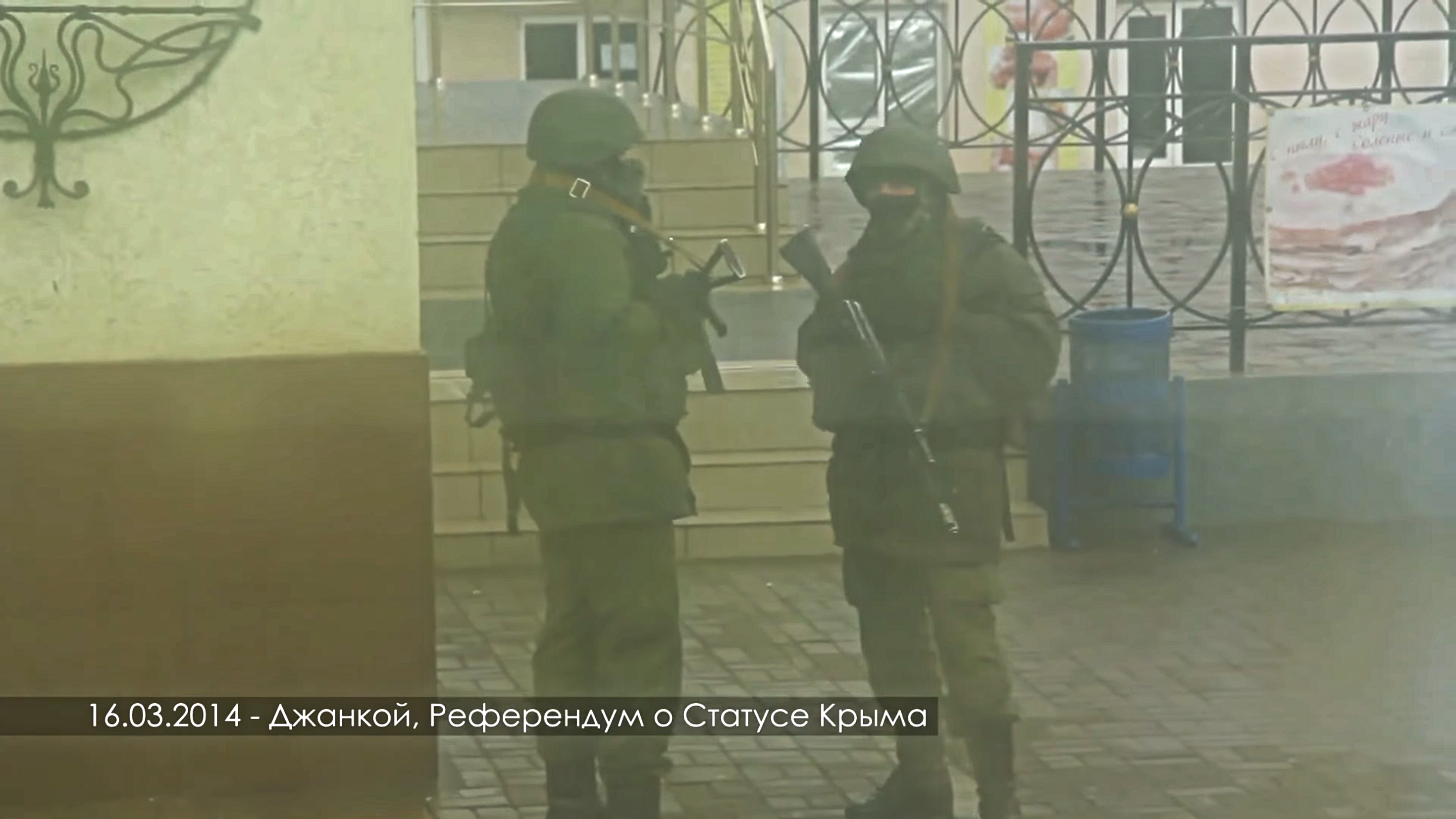
A polling station for the status referendum (top); masked Russian soldiers occupying Crimea during the status referendum (bottom).

A disputed referendum concerning the status of Crimea was conducted in the Autonomous Republic of Crimea and the city of Sevastopol (both subdivisions of Ukraine) on March 16, 2014, after Russian forces seized control of Crimea.

The referendum was a step in the process of Russia annexing Crimea. The referendum asked voters whether they wanted to rejoin Russia as a federal subject, or if they wanted to restore the 1992 Crimean constitution and Crimea's status as a part of Ukraine. The final date and ballot choices were set only ten days before the referendum was held. Before, during and after the referendum was proclaimed, the Crimean peninsula saw Russian soldiers take over public buildings and Ukrainian military installations. When the referendum was proclaimed, the Mejlis of the Crimean Tatar People called for a boycott of the referendum.

The official result from the Autonomous Republic of Crimea was a 97 percent vote for integration of the region into the Russian Federation, with an 83 percent voter turnout, and from Sevastopol there was also a 97 percent vote for integration with Russia, with an 89 percent voter turnout. (Note: Morello; Constable; Faiola (2014) "[Mikhail Malyshev, the Crimean election Spokesman,] who spoke briefly Monday morning on Crimean television, said a total of 1,274,096 people voted, for an 83.1 percent turnout. Of those who cast a ballot, [sic] 1,233,002 voted to shift to Russia, 31,997 voted to stay with Ukraine, and 9,097 were in invalid, Malyshev said.")

The March 16 referendum's available choices did not include keeping the status quo of Crimea and Sevastopol as they were at the moment the referendum was held. The 1992 constitution accords greater powers to the State Council of Crimea, including full sovereign powers to establish relations with other states; therefore, many Western and Ukrainian commentators argued that both provided referendum choices would result in de facto separation from Ukraine.

Following the referendum, the State Council of Crimea and Sevastopol City Council declared the independence of the Republic of Crimea from Ukraine and requested to join the Russian Federation. On the same day, Russia recognized the Republic of Crimea as a sovereign state.

The referendum was illegal under the Constitution of Ukraine. It is not recognized by most countries, as it was conducted under the auspices of Russian forces. Thirteen members of the United Nations Security Council voted in favor of a resolution declaring the referendum invalid, but Russia vetoed it and China abstained. A United Nations General Assembly resolution was later adopted, by a vote of 100 in favor vs. 11 against with 58 abstentions, which declared the referendum invalid and affirmed Ukraine's territorial integrity.

== Background ==
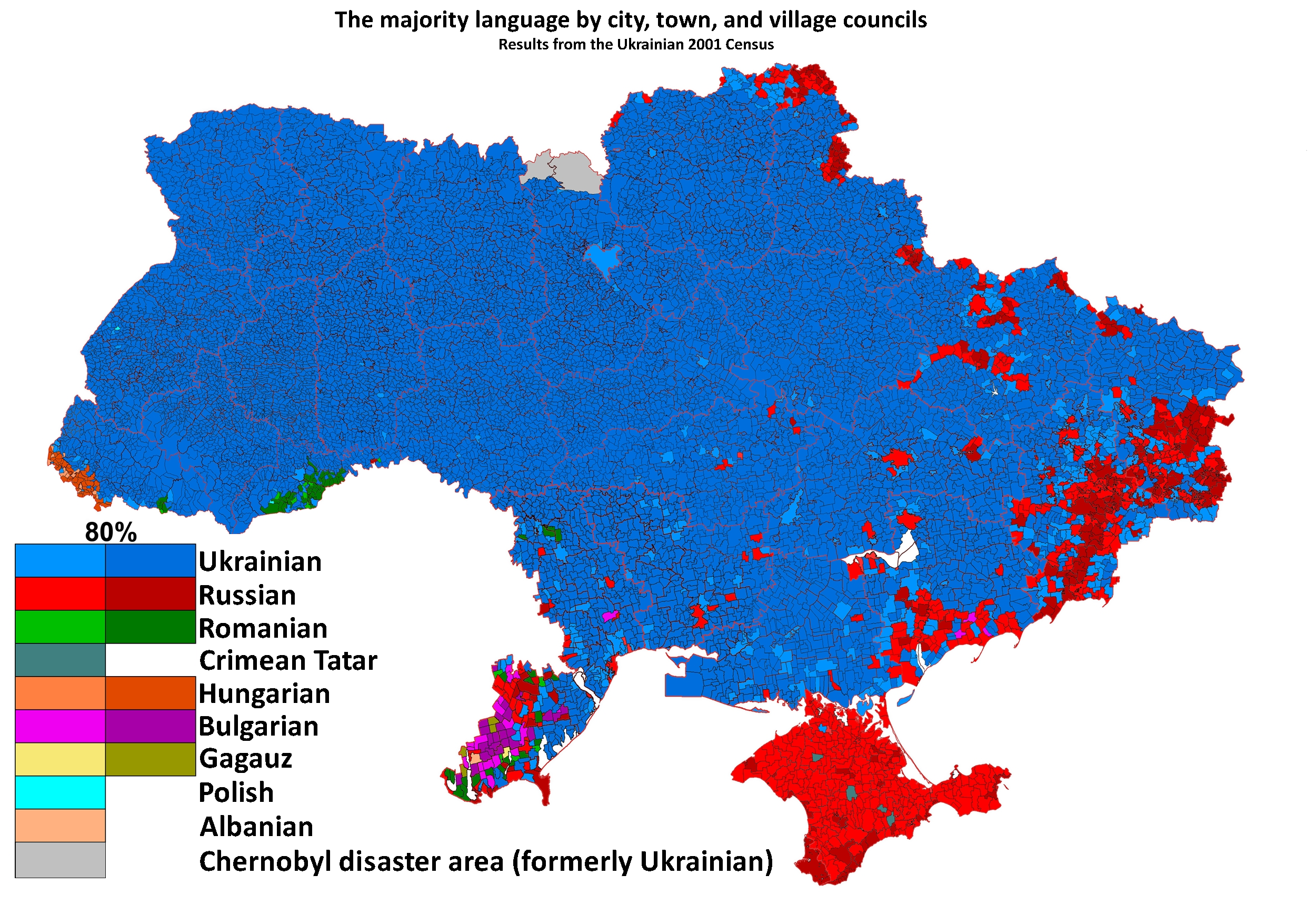
Linguistic map of Ukraine according to the 2001 census, with Russian (in red) dominant in Crimea.

Distribution of ethnicities in the Autonomous Republic of Crimea (which does not include Sevastopol) according to the 2001 census. Ethnic Russians comprise a majority at 58%.
Russians
Ukrainians
Tatars (Crimean and other)
Belarusians
Other

According to the 2001 Ukrainian population census, 58.3% of the population of the Autonomous Republic of Crimea are ethnic Russians, 24.3% are ethnic Ukrainians and 12% are Crimean Tatars. In Sevastopol, 71.6% are ethnic Russians and 22.4% are ethnic Ukrainians. 77% of Crimea's and 94% of Sevastopol's population are native speakers of Russian.

Crimea and Sevastopol are neighboring subdivisions of Ukraine located in the Crimean peninsula, a region with a long and complex history. Demographically, the region is currently populated by Russian-speaking majorities but with such demographics undergoing dramatic changes for the past 200 years, due in part to the deportation of the Crimean Tatars in 1944. Following the Tatar deportation, large numbers of ethnic Russians and ethnic Ukrainians settled in the region.

=== History ===
During the period of the Soviet Union, the Crimean Oblast was a subdivision of the Russian Soviet Federative Socialist Republic until the 1954 transfer of Crimea into the Ukrainian SSR. Crimea became part of independent Ukraine after the dissolution of the Soviet Union, shortly after Crimea had re-gained its autonomy following a 1991 referendum. The Ukrainian parliament abolished the 1992 Crimean Constitution and the office of President of Crimea in 1995. In 1998, Crimea gained a new constitution, which granted it less autonomy; notably, any legislation passed by the Crimean parliament could be vetoed by the Ukrainian parliament.

=== Polling prior to Russian occupation ===
Polling in 2008 by the Ukrainian Centre for Economic and Political Studies, also called the Razumkov Centre, found that a majority of Crimeans simultaneously approved the idea of joining Russia (63.8%), while also supporting the idea of remaining within Ukraine if Crimea was given greater autonomy (53.8%). Razumkov concluded that "the desired status of Crimea remains undecided by its residents. In their approaches, Crimeans reveal confusion, as they sometimes support mutually excluding alternatives... That is, half of Crimeans may, dependent on circumstances, support both secession of Crimea from Ukraine and an opposite scenario."

In contrast, the Kyiv Post polling found that from 2008–11, there was a rise of respondents who defined Ukraine as their "motherland" to increase from 32% to 71%.

The United Nations Development Programme conducted a series of polls in Crimea between 2009 and 2011 about the status of Crimea and the question of leaving Ukraine and joining Russia with a sample size of 1,200:

If a referendum was held on the annexation of the Autonomous Republic of Crimea to Russia, how would you vote?
Quarter	Yes	No	Undecided
2009 Q3	70%	14%	16%
2009 Q4	67%	15%	18%
2010 Q1	66%	14%	20%
2010 Q2	65%	12%	23%
2010 Q3	67%	11%	22%
2010 Q4	66%	9%	25%
2011 Q4	65.6%	14.2%	20.2%

There are different opinions about what status would be optimal for the Autonomous Republic of Crimea. Which of the options below most closely matches your views? In your opinion, the Autonomous Republic of Crimea should ...
Quarter	Become part of the Russian Federation	Become an independent state	Stay in Ukraine with greater autonomy	Stay in Ukraine with the same level of autonomy	Stay in Ukraine with reduced autonomy	Become a normal region of Ukraine	Become a region under the direct control of the president	Undecided
2009 Q3	46%	9%	24%	9%	0%	6%	0%	6%
2009 Q4	43%	10%	24%	9%	0%	7%	1%	6%
2010 Q1	44%	10%	24%	9%	0%	7%	0%	6%
2010 Q2	42%	10%	24%	9%	0%	6%	0%	7%
2010 Q3	48%	8%	24%	9%	0%	6%	0%	5%
2010 Q4	45%	7%	28%	9%	0%	5%	0%	6%
2011 Q4	41%	11%	19.1%	12.4%	0.1%	6.1%	2%	8.3%

A poll by the International Republican Institute in May 2013 found that 53% wanted "Autonomy in Ukraine (as today)", 12% were for "Crimean Tatar autonomy within Ukraine", 2% for "Common oblast of Ukraine", and 23% voted for "Crimea should be separated and given to Russia".

A poll conducted in Crimea in 2013 by the Kyiv International Institute of Sociology found that 35.9% of Crimeans support the unification of the entirety of Ukraine with Russia. The poll was repeated between February 8 – 18, 2014 (just days before the ousting of former Ukrainian president Viktor Yanukovych), with the amount of those wishing to join Ukraine and Russia rising to then 41%.

=== Pre-referendum ===
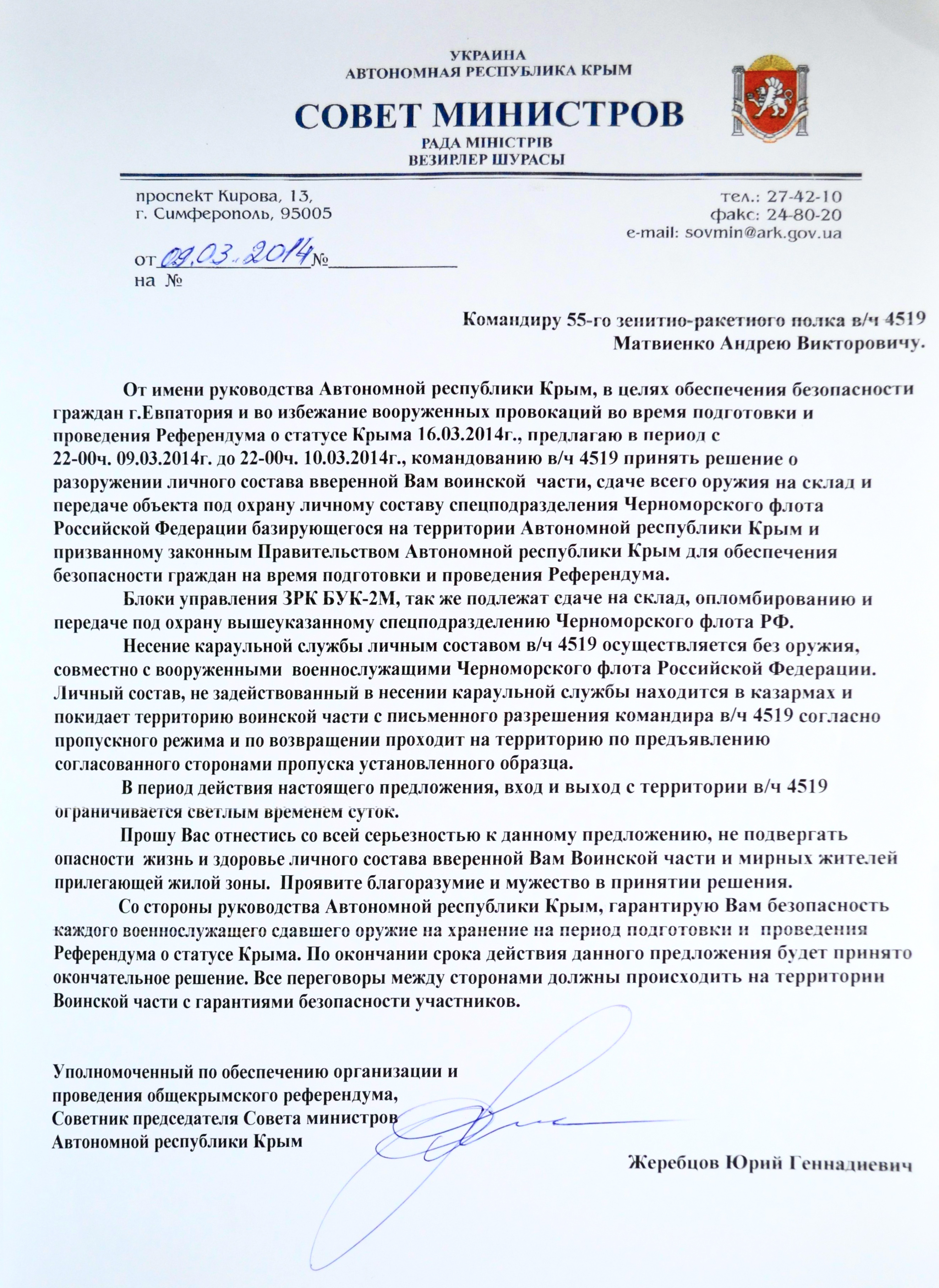
Request made in Russian language by the Ukrainian Council of Ministers of Crimea to the Ukrainian 55th Anti-Aircraft Artillery regiment in Yevpatoria to lay down arms under control of the Russian Black Sea Fleet for the period of the referendum.

On February 27, 2014, amidst tensions in the region due to the Ukrainian revolution, Russian forces cut the Crimean Peninsula off from mainland Ukraine and took over the Supreme Council of Crimea. The Crimean regional government was dissolved and reconstituted under Russian supervision, and voted to hold a referendum on the status of Crimea on May 25.

While 64 members of the 100 member legislature were registered as present during the votes, the actual number of members present at the time is unclear due to armed occupation of the parliament building. Russian militia commander Igor Girkin recounted that his squad "collected" the deputies into the chambers, and had to "forcibly drive them to vote". Enver Abduraimov, member of the parliament presidium, said that he did not go inside when he saw that armed guards who secured the building were confiscating all communications devices from deputies. Andriy Krysko, head of the Crimean branch of the Voters Committee of Ukraine, announced that no one from the parliament secretariat was in the building when voting took place.

The referendum was to be about the status of Crimea within Ukraine and was set for May 25, but later, on March 1, it was moved up to March 30. The referendum was approved by the Supreme Council of Crimea in February but the Central Election Commission of Ukraine denounced it by stating that the Crimean authorities do not possess the legal jurisdiction to conduct it. Regarding the referendum's initial purpose, The Daily Telegraph reported on February 27, that it, "appears to be for greater autonomy within Ukraine rather than for full independence."

On March 4, the district administration court of Kyiv nullified the no confidence vote in the Council of Ministers of Crimea and the appointment of Sergey Aksyonov as Prime Minister of Crimea and declared the organization and conduct of the referendum as illegal. On March 6, the Supreme Council changed the date of the referendum from March 30 to 16 and changed the choice for the referendum from greater autonomy to accession to the Russian Federation. This decision was made with 78 votes in favor and 8 abstentions. Concerns were raised about the presence of armed forces outside the parliament and reports of lawmakers being denied access to the vote. Later that day, acting President Turchynov announced "In accordance with power I am conferred on, I have stopped the decision of the Crimean parliament. The Verkhovna Rada of Ukraine will initiate dissolution of the parliament of the Autonomous Republic of Crimea. We will defend the inviolability of the Ukrainian territory." On 14 March, the referendum was deemed unconstitutional by the Constitutional Court of Ukraine, and a day later, the Verkhovna Rada formally dissolved the Crimean parliament.

The Mejlis of the Crimean Tatar People had called for a boycott of the referendum. Several hundred residents of Crimea, mainly Crimean Tatars, left Crimea for security reasons according to the State Border Guard Service of Ukraine. The BBC reported that most of the Crimean Tatars that they interviewed were boycotting the vote.

== Administration ==
=== Choices ===
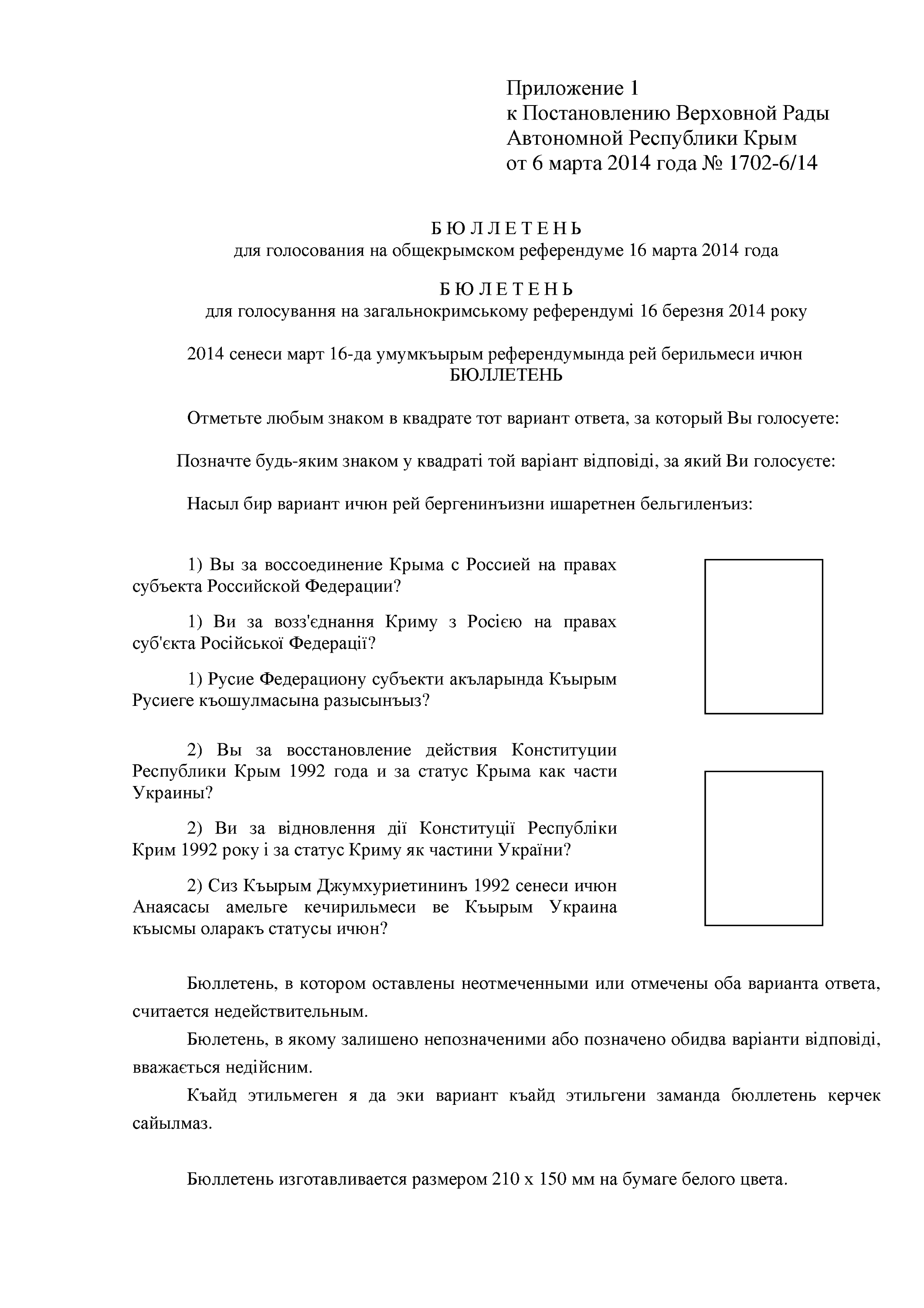
A ballot for voting on referendum written in three languages: Russian, Ukrainian and Crimean Tatar

There were two choices to choose from on the ballot. Voters were able to choose only one of these. The choices reflected the following stances:

Choice 1: Do you support the reunification of Crimea with Russia with all the rights of a federal subject of the Russian Federation?

Choice 2: Do you support the restoration of the Constitution of the Republic of Crimea in 1992 and the status of the Crimea as part of Ukraine?

The referendum's available choices did not include keeping the status quo of retaining arrangements enacted by the 1998 Constitution of the Autonomous Republic of Crimea. Additionally, the meaning of the second choice is unclear because there were two revisions of the Crimean constitution in 1992. The original 1992 constitution was adopted together with a declaration of independence, but the parliament then amended the constitution one day later to affirm that Crimea "was a part of Ukraine". (Note: Kolstø; Edemsky (1995) "On 5 May 1992 the Crimean parliament adopted a constitution plus a Declaration of Independence. [...] However, on the very next day, the parliament inserted a new sentence into the new constitution to the effect that the Crimean republic [was] a constituent part of the Ukrainian republic." p. 194)

Many commentators, including those at The New York Times, Kyiv Post, and Fox News, argued that both choices would result in de facto independence.

The ballot was printed in three languages: Russian, Ukrainian and Crimean Tatar (in the Cyrillic script).

=== Procedure ===
There were two simultaneous referendums, one organised by the Sevastopol City Council and another organised by a special committee set up by the Autonomous Republic of Crimea.

Several irregularities were reported during the vote. People were seen dropping the ballots before the start of the referendum. Journalists were not allowed at some stations.

The referendum was to be decided by a simple majority with the choice with the most votes declared winner. (Note: Crimean Parliament (2014; in Russian) "Вопрос, получивший большинство голосов, считается выражающим прямое волеизъявление населения Крыма.") The referendum rules did not state if there was a threshold number of votes needed for the result to be enacted.

== Legal aspects ==
President of Russia Vladimir Putin during his conversation with Mustafa Dzhemilev, a former chairman of the Mejlis of the Crimean Tatar People, stated that Ukrainian Independence from the Soviet Union was not obtained legitimately, (Note: The Constitution of the Soviet Union did give the Republics of the Soviet Union the right to secede.) while maintaining that the Crimean referendum followed all international-law, the UN charter, and the convention established by Kosovo's NATO-prodded annexation from Serbia.

Russia and the Crimean parliament argue that the referendum is legal, citing the UN recognized right of self-determination and the advisory opinion on Kosovo in which the International Court of Justice declared that international law contains no prohibition against declarations of independence. Legal scholars have disputed the validity of the Kosovo analogy.

Organizing and holding the referendum on Crimea's accession to Russia was illegal under the Constitution of Ukraine. According to article 73 of the 1996 Constitution of Ukraine and article 3 of the 2012 Ukrainian law "On all-Ukrainian referendum", territorial changes can only be approved via a referendum where all the citizens of Ukraine are allowed to vote, including those that do not reside in Crimea. The Central Election Commission of Ukraine also stated that there are no judicial possibilities, according to the legislation of Ukraine, to initiate such changes.

Both of the ballot options for the March 16, 2014 Crimean referendum acknowledged that Crimea was already an independent state at that time, despite the declaration of independence occurring without a national vote in Ukraine, as the constitutions required.

The interim Ukrainian government, the European Union, and several other bodies stated that any referendum held by the local government of Crimea without the express authority of Ukraine is unconstitutional and illegitimate. The interim government in Kyiv and the pro-Russian Crimean faction did not recognize each other as legitimate. Additionally, the Mejlis of the Crimean Tatar People—the unofficial political association of the Crimean Tatars—called for a boycott of the referendum.

The Venice Commission declared that the referendum was illegal under both Ukrainian and Crimean Constitutions, and violated international standards and norms. The Venice Commission stressed that self-determination was to be understood primarily as internal self-determination within the framework of the existing borders and not as external self-determination through secession. Moreover, the Venice Commission opined, any referendum on the status of a territory should have been preceded by serious negotiations among all stakeholders, and that such negotiations did not take place.

Many scholars and politicians (Neil Melvin, Robert McCorquodale, John Kerry, John B. Bellinger III, Marc Weller among others) have stated that the referendum was conducted under the cover of assault rifles and, thus, the result was obtained through violence.

Party of Regions MP Yuriy Miroshnychenko claimed on March 11 that "the Crimean referendum is illegitimate, and its holding must be immediately stopped". Another Party of Regions MP, Hanna Herman, commented the same day about Yanukovych's press conference, "He needs to ... prevent the illegal referendum".

== Campaign ==
According to BBC News the campaign leading up to the referendum was "almost entirely pro-Russian". Pro-Russia election posters often featured crossed-out swastikas in an alleged attempt to be saying "No" to the Ukrainian government, whom they alleged to be neo-Nazis. Shortly after the referendum was called, Ukrainian TV channels were made unavailable for Crimean viewers, some of them were replaced with Russian stations. BBC News also stated it had received reports of violence against pro-Ukrainian activists.

Unsigned billboards and leaflets campaigning for the referendum, describing new Ukraine government as fascists and showing economic reasons to join Russia, appeared throughout Crimea.

== Observers ==
=== OSCE and UN absence ===
On March 10, 2014 the de facto Prime Minister of Crimea, Sergey Aksyonov, made an unofficial verbal invitation to the Organization for Security and Co-operation in Europe (OSCE) to monitor the plebiscite. However, later in the day, an OSCE spokeswoman said that Crimea did not have the authority to invite the organization into the region as it is not a fully-fledged state and, therefore, incapable of requesting services provided exclusively to OSCE members. OSCE personnel already in Crimea were asked to leave by the pro-Russian authorities. On March 11, the OSCE chair, Switzerland's Foreign Minister Didier Burkhalter, declared the referendum as unconstitutional and therefore the OSCE would not send observers. OSCE military observers attempted to enter the region four times but were turned away, sometimes after warning shots were fired, which was another reason given for not dispatching referendum observers.

OSCE also published a report about their observations which "produced significant evidence of equipment consistent with the presence of Russian Federation military personnel in the vicinity of the various roadblocks encountered".

The UN Human Rights Envoy Ivan Šimonović had to cancel his trip to Crimea as the current situation did not permit his travel. He intended to observe the human rights situation which was Russia's explanation for its engagement in Crimea. Reports from the UN criticised the circumstances surrounding the referendum, especially the presence of paramilitaries, self-defence groups and unidentifiable soldiers.

=== Non-OSCE observers ===
Russian-controlled media and referendum organizers said that from nearly 70 to 135 international observers monitored the referendum without reporting any violations, but the objectivity of these has been questioned, because many of them had ties to far-right extremist groups.

According to Yale University historian Timothy Snyder, the Russian government invited individuals belonging to European far-right, anti-semitic and neo-Nazi parties to serve as observers. At least some of the international observers were managed and financed by the Eurasian Observatory for Democracy & Elections (EODE), a far-right, NGO international election-monitoring organization.

Shaun Walker from The Guardian reported that during a press conference on the eve of the referendum, some of the aforementioned observers "went on political rants against U.S. hegemony in the world", describing the press conference as "rather bizarre". (Note: Urquhat; Williamson; Nelid (2014) "[Walker has] just come back from a rather bizarre "press conference" of international observers for the referendum. It was 45 minutes before there were any questions, as the six people present mainly went on political rants against US hegemony in the world.")

Exit-polls were allowed only for the Republican Institute of Sociological Research since, according to Russia-24, no other organizations have applied for accreditation for exit polls.

=== Allegations of fraud ===
A Russian journalist claimed that she was allowed to vote even after admitting she was a Russian citizen with only a temporary one-year permit to live in Crimea. "According to all the laws, this is illegal," she said in one interview. "I am a foreign citizen. How can I decide the destiny of the Crimean Autonomous Republic of Ukraine?"

The chairman of the electoral campaign of the Mejlis of the Crimean Tatar People claimed officials did not check carefully whether voters' names were on the electoral register and that some voters were bussed in to Bakhchysarai to increase participation rates in the city. Mejlis also stated that only 34.2% of Crimea residents participated in the referendum.

There were a few reports of people confiscating identification documents before the voting day. Simferopol city administration confirmed these claims and declared these actions unlawful.

A senior US official claimed there was "concrete evidence" of some ballots having been pre-marked.

According to three Czech observers funded by the pro-Russian far-right non-governmental organization Eurasian Observatory for Democracy & Elections, deputy Stanislav Berkovec reported that the voting was free and the foreign deputies could move freely. According to his discussions with people, even the Tatars inclined towards Russia. Another deputy Milan Šarapatka reported that the referendum was formally regular and that there was no evidence of pressure on voters. According to Miloslav Soušek (the Vysoké Mýto mayor), the course of the referendum was comparable to the elections in the Czech Republic; he claimed he saw no soldiers in the town.

== Results ==
=== Official results ===
According to the Central Election Commission of Ukraine on February 28, 2014 there were 1,534,815 registered voters in the autonomous republic of Crimea and 309,774 in the city of Sevastopol, which totals to 1,844,589 voters in the two Ukrainian regions.

According to organizers of the referendum, 1,274,096 people voted in the Autonomous Republic of Crimea, giving the plebiscite an 83.1% turnout in that region.

Final results from the Autonomous Republic of Crimea (Values in italics are calculated by an editor rather than provided by official sources.)
Choice	Votes	Percentage of registered voters	Percentage of all ballots cast	Percentage of valid votes
Join the Russian Federation as federal subject of Russia?	1,233,002	80.42%	96.77%	97.47%
Restore the 1992 Crimea constitution and become a part of Ukraine?	31,997	2.09%	2.51%	2.53%
Subtotal of valid votes	1,264,999	82.51%	99.28%	100.00%
Invalid or blank votes	9,097	0.59%	0.72%	—
Total votes cast	1,274,096	83.1%	100.00%	—
Registered voters that did not participate	≈ 259,112	16.9%	—	—
Total registered voters	(Note: Calculated as Total votes cast divided by Turnout) ≈ 1,533,208	100.00%	—	—

Final results from Sevastopol (Values in italics are calculated by an editor rather than provided by official sources.)
Choice	Votes	Percentage of registered voters	Percentage of all ballots cast	Percentage of valid votes
Join the Russian Federation as Federal subject of Russia?	262,041	85.56%	95.6%	96.59%
Restore the 1992 Crimea constitution and become a part of Ukraine?	9,250	3.02%	3.37%	3.41%
Subtotal of valid votes	271,291	88.58%	98.97%	100.00%
Invalid or blank votes	2,810	0.92%	1.03%	—
Total votes cast	274,101	89.50%	100.00%	—
Registered voters that did not participate	32,157	10.50%	—	—
Total registered voters	306,258	100.00%	—	—

=== Alternative estimates of results ===
In the evening of 16 March 2014, Mikhail Malyshev, the Crimean election Spokesman, reported that as of 20:00, 1,250,427 people or 81.36% voted in the Autonomous Republic of Crimea and 274,136 or 89.50% voted in Sevastopol for a total of 1,524,563 or 82.71% of the electorate. ITAR-TASS initially reported this as 1,724,563 voters in total, but corrected it later. The discrepancy led to some reports of a 123% turnout in Sevastopol.

Mustafa Dzhemilev, a recent Chairman of the Mejlis of the Crimean Tatar People, reports that according to his sources the actual turnout was only 32.4%. Mejlis Deputy Chairman Akhtem Chiygoz argued that voter turnout in the referendum among Crimeans did not exceed 30–40 percent.

Andrey Illarionov, a senior fellow at the Cato Institute and a former Russian government adviser, cited results of previous polls over past three years showing the Crimean support for joining Russia between 23 and 41 percent to conclude that the actual support for the reunification of Crimea with Russia was about 34 percent and that at least two thirds of Crimea did not vote for it. He called the referendum a "grossly rigged falsification" and the outcome "cynically distorted".

=== Post-referendum polls ===
The results of a survey by the U.S. government Broadcasting Board of Governors agency, conducted April 21–29, 2014, showed that 83% of Crimeans felt that the results of the March 16 referendum on Crimea's status likely reflected the views of most people there, whereas this view is shared only by 30% in the rest of Ukraine.

Gallup conducted an immediate post-referendum survey of Ukraine and Crimea and published their results in April 2014. Gallup reported that, among the population of Crimea, 93.6% of ethnic Russians and 68.4% of ethnic Ukrainians believed the referendum result accurately represents the will of the Crimean people. Only 1.7% of ethnic Russians and 14.5% of ethnic Ukrainians living in Crimea thought that the referendum results did not accurately reflect the views of the Crimean people. According to Gallup's survey performed on April 21–27, 82.8% of Crimean people consider the referendum results reflecting most Crimeans' views, and 73.9% of Crimeans say Crimea's becoming part of Russia will make life better for themselves and their families, while 5.5% disagree.

In May 2014, Washington, D.C., pollster Pew Research published results of a survey that encompassed Crimea, Ukraine, and Russia, in which it was reported that 88% of Crimeans believed the government of Kyiv should officially recognize the result of Crimea's referendum. According to survey carried out by Pew Research Center in April 2014, the majority of Crimean residents say they believed the referendum was free and fair (91%) and that the government in Kyiv ought to recognize the results of the vote (88%).

Between December 12 and 25, 2014, Levada-Center carried out a survey of Crimea that was commissioned by John O'Loughlin, college professor of distinction and professor of geography at the University of Colorado in Boulder, and Gerard Toal (Gearóid Ó Tuathail), professor of government and international affairs at Virginia Tech's National Capital Region campus. The results of that survey were published by Open Democracy in March, 2015, and reported that, overall, 84% of Crimeans felt the choice to secede from Ukraine and accede to Russia was "Absolutely the right decision", with the next-largest segment of respondents saying the decision to return to Russia was the "Generally right decision". The survey commissioners, John O'Loughlin and Gerard Toal, wrote in their Open Democracy article that, while they felt that the referendum was "an illegal act under international law", their survey shows "It is also an act that enjoys the widespread support of the peninsula's inhabitants, with the important exception of its Crimean Tatar population" with "widespread support for Crimea's decision to secede from Ukraine and join the Russian Federation one year ago". Their survey also reported that a majority of Crimean Tatars viewed Crimea's return to Russia as either the "Absolutely right decision" or the "Generally right decision".

From January 16 – 22, 2015, Germany's GfK Group, with support from the Canada Fund for Local Initiatives, followed-up their pre-referendum survey of Crimeans' voting intention with a post-referendum survey about how satisfied Crimeans are with the outcome of their referendum. GfK's post-referendum survey found that 82% of Crimeans "Fully endorse" Crimea's referendum and return to Russia, while another 11% "Mostly endorse" it. According to a poll of the Crimeans by the Ukrainian branch of Germany's biggest market research organization, GfK, on January 16–22, 2015: "Eighty-two percent of those polled said they fully supported Crimea's inclusion in Russia, and another 11 percent expressed partial support. Only 4 percent spoke out against it. ... Fifty-one percent reported their well-being had improved in the past year." Bloomberg's Leonid Bershidsky noted that "The calls were made on Jan. 16–22 to people living in towns with a population of 20,000 or more, which probably led to the peninsula's native population, the Tatars, being underrepresented because many of them live in small villages. On the other hand, no calls were placed in Sevastopol, the most pro-Russian city in Crimea. Even with these limitations, it was the most representative independent poll taken on the peninsula since its annexation."

From February 9 – 18, 2015, Russian public opinion research centre, VTsIOM, carried out a door-to-door survey of 1,600 Crimean respondents. The VTsIOM survey asked how people would vote if the same referendum on Crimea's identity that was held in March 2014 were held again at the present time (February 2015). VTsIOM reported that 97% of ethnic Russians, 91% of ethnic Ukrainians, 49% of ethnic Tatars, and 92% of all other ethnic groups would vote for Crimea to join Russia, while 1% of ethnic Russians, 4% of ethnic Ukrainians, 26% of ethnic Tatars, and 2% of all other ethnic groups would vote to remain an autonomous region of Ukraine.

In November 2017, German pollster ZOiS published the results of a survey which reported that 85.3% of Crimeans excluding Tatars, and 61.8% of Crimean Tatars excluding other Crimean demographics thought that Crimeans would either vote the same or that the majority would vote the same as they did in 2014 if the same referendum were held at the present time (November 2017). 3.8% of Crimeans excluding Tatars, and 16.2% of Crimean Tatars responded that most Crimeans would vote differently if the same referendum were held again at that time in 2017. The ZOiS survey also reported that, among the Crimean population apart from Tatars, when asked what was the reason Crimea became a part of Russia in 2014, 32.9% of respondents said that Crimea became a part of Russia as a result of Kyiv's neglect of the region over many years, 25% of respondents said it happened because of the mobilization of the Crimean population, 24% respondents said it happened as a result of the Euromaidan, and 17.4% said it happened as a result of Russia's action. When the same question was asked of Crimean Tatars, excluding all other demographics in Crimea, 36.3% of respondents said that Crimea became a part of Russia as a result of the Euromaidan, 32.9% said it happened as a result of Kyiv's neglect of the region over many years, 24% of respondents said it happened as a result of Russia's action, and 7.8% said it happened because of the mobilization of the Crimean population.

In March 2019, Russian public opinion research centre, VTsIOM, published the results of a new survey of Crimea in which 89% of respondents said they would vote to "reunify" with Russia if a referendum on the matter were held next week. The same survey reported 93% of Crimeans viewed Crimea's "reunification" with Russia in a positive light, while 3% viewed it in a negative light. 86% of respondents said they believed that Crimea is developing more successfully as under Russian control, while 72% said that the "reunification" had a positive effect on their lives and that of their families. 59% of respondents said they had "noticed positive changes on the peninsula in the last year".

In December 2019, Levada-Center was again commissioned by John O'Loughlin, college professor of distinction and professor of geography at the University of Colorado in Boulder, and Gerard Toal (Gearóid Ó Tuathail), professor of government and international affairs at Virginia Tech's National Capital Region campus, to carry-out a survey of Crimea's attitudes towards their referendum and living as a part of Russia. The survey aimed to repeat the questions of their 2014 survey. The 2019 survey found that 82% of Crimea's population supported Crimea's accession to Russia, as opposed to 86% in 2014. The survey also found that 58% of Crimean Tatars now supported Crimea's accession to Russia, as opposed to 39% in 2014.

== Reactions ==
Countries recognizing results of the Crimean referendum Crimea

Refat Chubarov, leader of Mejlis of the Crimean Tatar People, commented on the decision of Supreme Council of Crimea. (in Russian)

Most countries, particularly Western ones, declared the referendum invalid and a breach of Ukrainian sovereignty.

=== Domestic ===
- The Mejlis of the Crimean Tatar People has announced that "Crimean Tatars will not take part in the referendum and deem it illegitimate." Mejlis Deputy Chairman Ahtem Chiygoz stated that the Tatar people mostly had not participated. He stated that voter turnout in the referendum among Crimeans could not be beyond 30–40 percent, contrary to the claims of a 70 percent participation. He noted that the "Maximum [amount of] voters, who in the best times and in a peaceful environment could come to the polls and vote for a particular party or a particular candidate, never exceeded 40 percent. And now all 70 percent and without participation of the Crimean Tatars".
- The Ukrainian government has announced it will not recognise the referendum. Acting president Oleksandr Turchynov stated: "It is not a referendum, it is a farce, a fake and a crime against the state which is organised by the Russian Federation's military." Former prime minister Yulia Tymoshenko alleged Russian coercion in allowing the referendum and that the international community should not allow it to happen.

=== Supranational bodies ===
- European Union – All 28 member states of the European Union believe the separation of the Crimea from Ukraine to be unacceptable under international law.
- The European Parliament rejected the referendum on independence in Crimea, which they saw as manipulated and contrary to international and Ukrainian law.
- G7 world leaders said that they would not recognize the results of a referendum for Ukraine's Crimea region. The leaders called on Russia to "immediately" halt actions supporting the referendum on Crimea regarding its status.

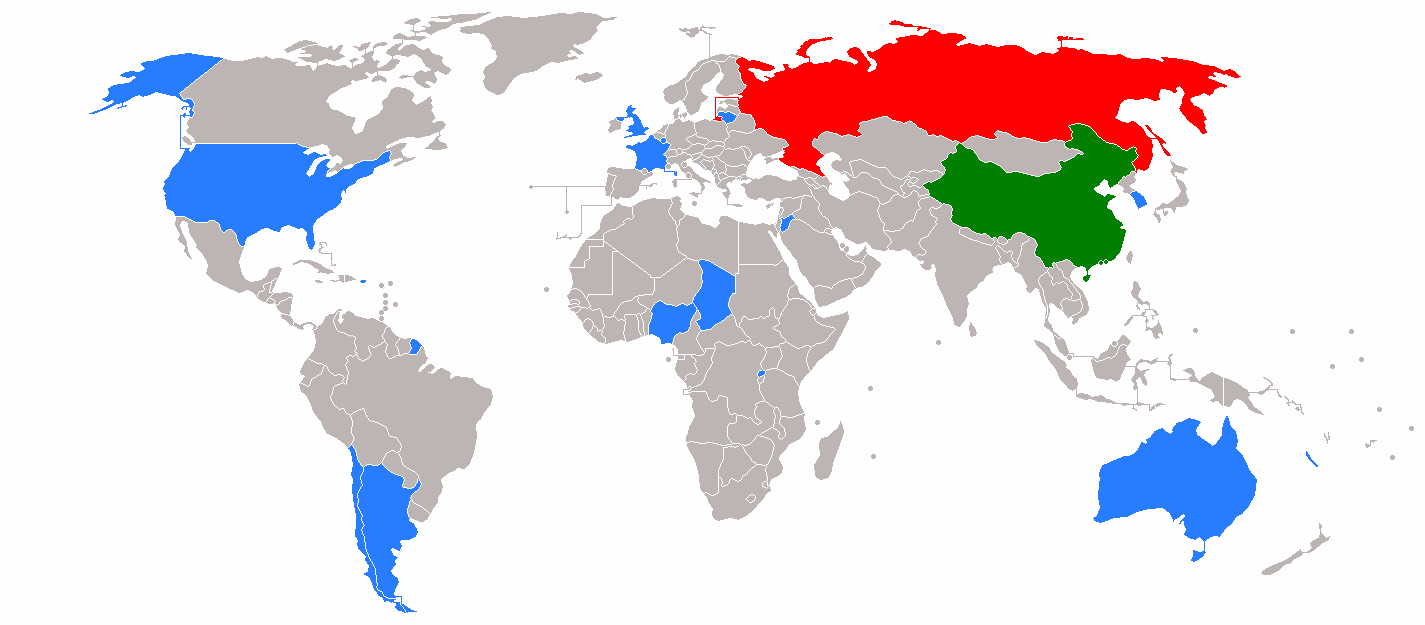
UN Security Council vote on a draft resolution condemning the 2014 Crimean referendum. Voted in favor of resolution Abstained Vetoed resolution

- UN On March 15, the United Nations Security Council voted 13–1 (with one abstention: China) to condemn the referendum, but Russia vetoed the draft resolution. On April 16, Assistant Secretary-General for Human Rights Ivan Šimonović has briefed the Security Council on the situation in Ukraine, and turning to his March 21 to 22 visit to Crimea he said "Media manipulation significantly contributed to a climate of fear and insecurity in the period preceding the referendum, and the presence of paramilitary and so-called self-defence groups, as well as soldiers in uniform but without insignia, was not conducive to an environment in which voters could freely exercise their right to hold opinions and the right to freedom of expression".
- UN The United Nations General Assembly approved a resolution describing the Crimean referendum as illegal. One hundred countries voted in favour of approving a UN General Assembly resolution declaring the Crimean referendum illegal and affirming Ukraine's territorial integrity. Eleven nations voted against, with fifty-eight abstentions.
- The Monitoring Committee, in its report that was the basis for PACE resolution No. 1988 (2014) of April 9, 2014, questioned the official outcome of the referendum. Russians accounted for only 54% of the population and around 36% were Crimean Tatars and ethnic Ukrainians, who had announced a boycott of the referendum. The authors of the report argued that the combination of an 82% turnout and a 96% vote in favor of annexation was therefore implausible.
- NATO – Secretary-General Anders Fogh Rasmussen said on March 14, "a planned referendum in Ukraine's Crimea region would violate international law and lack legitimacy". On April 12, NATO published a fact sheet claims that "the referendum was illegal according to the Ukrainian constitution, which states that questions of altering the territory of Ukraine are resolved exclusively by an All-Ukrainian referendum and was organized in a matter of weeks by a self-proclaimed Crimean leadership that was installed by armed Russian military personnel after seizing government buildings".
- Venice Commission – Experts of the Council of Europe for constitutional law have said that the referendum in Crimea on the peninsula's joining Russia which the Crimean authorities plan to hold on March 16 is illegal and it is not in line with the Constitution of Ukraine. The Council of Europe's so-called Venice Commission which is made up of independent constitutional experts said Crimea's vote to secede was undemocratic and violated Ukraine's constitution. Crimea's referendum to join Russia was "illegal", an advisory body of the pro-democracy Council of Europe said on March 21, as East-West tensions mounted over Moscow's annexation of the Ukrainian peninsula. The Venice Commission has emphasized that the right to self-determination should be understood primarily as an internal self-determination within the existing borders, and not as an external self-determination through secession. In addition, any referendum on the status of the territory requires serious preliminary negotiations with all interested parties, and there were not such negotiations.

=== UN member states ===
Results of the United Nations General Assembly vote about the territorial integrity of Ukraine. In favor Against Abstentions Absent Non-members

- Afghanistan – The office of President Hamid Karzai said that Afghanistan respected "decision the people of Crimea took through a recent referendum that considers Crimea as part of the Russian Federation". Some sources stated that Afghanistan's government's break with its allies may have been due to Afghanistan's own irredentist aspirations to similarly regain Pashtun-inhabited parts of Pakistan.
- Albania – The Ministry of Foreign Affairs of the Republic of Albania described the referendum as illegal in a statement and strongly objected to the idea that the declaration of independence of Crimea should be treated in the same manner as the declaration of independence of Kosovo. After the referendum, the Ministry reiterated its stance, saying the referendum set a dangerous precedent.
- Argentina – The president of Argentina Cristina Fernández de Kirchner, whose nation currently is a non-permanent member of the United Nations Security Council, criticized the United States, the European Union and the United Kingdom pointing out the hypocrisy that stems from them trying to act as the "world's police force". Kirchner further stated the double standards of the aforementioned bodies by stating that "My country is suffering an encroachment in the Malvinas Islands by the United Kingdom, and the major powers have spoken in favor of the referendum that 'kelpers' had: that is double standard. Can agree with the regional integrity in Crimea but not Argentina's", in reference to the Falkland Islands sovereignty dispute and its recent referendum in 2013.
- Armenia – Foreign Minister Eduard Nalbandyan said on March 17 that Armenia is "for the settlement of the Ukrainian crisis through dialogue, in peaceful and negotiated manner based on the UN Charter, international law." During a phone conversation with Putin on March 19 President Serzh Sargsyan said the referendum in Crimea was an exercise of peoples' right to self-determination via free expression of will. Both leaders highlighted the importance of a commitment to the norms and principles of international law. Asbarez commented that Sargsyan "apparently recognized Crimea's referendum to secede from Ukraine and join Russia." In response, on March 20, Oleh Tyahnybok, the leader of the Ukrainian far-right Svoboda, urged to recall the Ukrainian ambassador to Armenia.
- Australia – Foreign Minister Julie Bishop has rejected the legitimacy of the referendum, given the brief time frame, the disregard of the Ukrainian constitution and the presence of Russian troops on the peninsula. Australia also imposes sanctions on Russia.
- Belarus – The position of President Alexander Lukashenko is vague: it includes "Ukraine should remain an integral, indivisible, non-aligned state" and "As for Crimea, I do not like it when the integrity and independence of a country are broken", on the one hand, and "Today Crimea is part of the Russian Federation. No matter whether you recognize it or not, the fact remains." and "Whether Crimea will be recognized as a region of the Russian Federation de jure does not really matter", on the other hand.
- Canada – Prime Minister Stephen Harper said the Canadian government will not recognize the result and that the region was under "illegal military occupation".
- China – Foreign Ministry spokesperson Hong Lei said, "China always respects all countries' sovereignty, independence and territorial integrity. The Crimean issue should be resolved politically under a framework of law and order. All parties should exercise restraint and refrain from raising the tension."
- Finland – The Foreign Ministry described the referendum as "against the Ukrainian constitution and, as such, illegal" and said it would "only aggravate the situation further".
- France – Foreign Minister Laurent Fabius said that the referendum in Ukraine's Crimea region planned for March 16 is illegitimate and the annexation of Crimea by Russia would be illegal. French President François Hollande told his Russian counterpart, Vladimir Putin, in a phone call that the referendum planned in Crimea "has no legal basis".
- Georgia – On March 16, the Foreign Ministry released a statement saying it "does not recognize the referendum" as it occurred "amid pressure from Russian armed forces, in defiance of the universally recognized norms and principles of international law, with complete disregard for the Ukrainian national laws." It added, "Russia's attempt to annex Crimea represents a blatant violation of the commitments it has undertaken both under multilateral and bilateral agreements." On March 17, President Giorgi Margvelashvili called it an "illegal referendum" and expressed his "extreme concern". He said that "it is unimaginable to speak about free choice and free expression of people's will, where the situation is controlled by foreign, namely Russian, armed formations." He asserted that Georgia does not recognize the referendum and support Ukraine's sovereignty and territorial integrity.
- Germany – Chancellor Angela Merkel called the referendum "illegal and incompatible with Ukraine's constitution."
- Hungary – The Ministry of Foreign Affairs regarded "the changing of the legal status of Crimea as illegitimate and unlawful", emphasizing that it "remains committed to Ukraine's sovereignty, independence and territorial integrity."
- Iceland – On March 14, the Foreign Minister Gunnar Bragi Sveinsson released a statement saying "The forthcoming referendum Crimea is taking place under Russian occupation. It is not in accordance with international law and is only bound to increase tensions in the region. It goes without saying that the outcome of such a referendum cannot be validated".
- India – India stated "There are legitimate Russian and other interests involved and we hope they are discussed and resolved." Further India made it clear that it will not support any "unilateral measures" against Russian government. "India has never supported unilateral sanctions against any country. Therefore, we will also not support any unilateral measures by a country or a group of countries against Russia."
- Indonesia – The Minister of Foreign Affairs Marty Natalegawa stated, as instructed by the President Susilo Bambang Yudhoyono, stated that Republic of Indonesia does not recognize the Crimean referendum which is viewed as a violation of Ukrainian unity and sovereignty.
- Japan – Foreign Minister Fumio Kishida announced a set of sanctions against Russia for its recognition of Crimea as an independent state. Japan does not recognize the outcome of Crimea's referendum to split from Ukraine, saying it violates the Ukrainian constitution, and the country's sanctions to Russia involve suspension of talks on relaxing visa requirements between the two countries as well as planned talks on investment, space and military.
- Kazakhstan – Kazakhstan views the referendum held in Crimea "as a free expression of will of the Autonomous Republic's population".
- Kyrgyzstan – Kyrgyzstan views the interim Ukrainian government as legitimate and has stated concern over the crisis, and condemns any activities aimed at destabilizing the situation in Ukraine. Nevertheless, the country recognized the referendum results as reflecting "the views of the region's absolute majority."
- Lithuania – Lithuania supports and recognizes Ukraine's territorial integrity, including Crimea. Foreign Minister Linas Linkevičius has labeled the referendum as unhelpful in engendering a solution to the crisis.
- Norway – On March 14, the Foreign Minister Børge Brende released a statement saying "the referendum in Crimea, if it is held on Sunday as planned, is in violation of international law and lacks legitimacy".
- Philippines – The Department of Foreign Affairs released a statement saying that the Philippines is concerned over developments in Crimea, and urges all parties to exercise maximum restraint under United Nations General Assembly Resolution 3314. The DFA also urged for "comprehensive, inclusive and peaceful dialogue and reconciliation, with full respect for the rule of law".
- Poland – The Minister of Foreign Affairs Radosław Sikorski told Corriere della Sera on March 16, 2014, that the Crimean referendum was a farce under the barrel of a gun, reminiscent of the 19th-century territorial acquisitions. Following a working visit of the Polish delegation in Kyiv, the MFA Press Office stated on April 1, that Poland have allocated nearly half a million zlotys toward expert assistance for the Ukrainian regional reforms.
- Romania – President Traian Băsescu issued a statement declaring that: "Romania considers the referendum illegal, and will not recognize the results". Foreign Minister Titus Corlățean called it "illegal and illegitimate" and "a violation of the Ukrainian Constitution", adding that the "result will not be recognized by the democratic international community".
- Russia – Chairman of the Federation Council, Valentina Matviyenko, said that Russia will welcome Crimea to the Federation if the referendum passes. President Vladimir Putin has further solidified Russia's position on the matter, stating: "The steps taken by the legitimate leadership of Crimea are based on the norms of international law and aim to ensure the legal interests of the population of the peninsula." During a phone call with once deported, former leader of the Crimean Tatars Mustafa Dzhemilev President Putin informed him that the rights of this indigenous people are important to him and that he ordered to prevent any violence against the Crimean Tatars. On March 17, President Putin signed a decree recognizing Crimea as a sovereign state. The State Duma issued a statement that was supported by 441 legislators, with one abstention and said: "Welcoming the expression of will by the Crimean people at the March 16 referendum on accession of the Republic of Crimea and the city of Sevastopol to Russia, the State Duma proceeds from the standpoint that the government bodies operating on the territory of Crimea will be maintaining inter-faith accord and language diversity of the republic. The State Duma will contribute to ensuring the safety of all people staying in Crimea, regardless of their citizenship, nationality, language or religion, and to observing their legitimate rights and freedoms". Mayor of Moscow, Sergey Sobyanin congratulated residents of the Republic of Crimea. He recalled that Russians had always felt unity with Crimea and Sevastopol.
- Serbia – Ministry of Foreign Affairs refused to comment on Crimean referendum due to the caretaker status of the Government following the elections.
- South Korea – The Ministry of Foreign Affairs stated that "The sovereignty, territorial right and independence of Ukraine must necessarily be respected," adding that "Our government cannot recognize the (recent) referendum on Crimean people and Russia's (subsequent) annexation of Crimea."
- Turkey – The Ministry of Foreign Affairs of Turkey stated that, "The result of the unlawful and illegitimate 'referendum' held in Crimea on Sunday, 16 March 2014, and the de facto situation that will prevail following the steps that will be taken in conjunction with this referendum will not bear any legal validity for Turkey and will not recognize." Also, Turkey supports and recognizes Ukraine's territorial integrity, including Crimea. Foreign Minister Ahmet Davutoğlu has labeled the referendum as unhelpful in engendering a solution to the crisis.
- United Kingdom – Prime Minister David Cameron has declared that any referendum vote in Crimea will be "illegal, illegitimate, and will not be recognized by the international community". Foreign Secretary William Hague said that "I condemn the fact that this referendum has taken place. ... The UK does not recognise the referendum or its outcome. ... we believe measures must be adopted that send a strong signal to Russia that this challenge to the sovereignty and territorial integrity of Ukraine will bring economic and political consequences."
- United States – The United States will not recognize the results of the referendum, and will continue to consider Crimea as part of Ukraine. President Barack Obama claimed that the referendum would violate Ukrainian sovereignty and international law. UN ambassador Samantha Power called it "illegitimate and without any legal effect". The United States issued limited sanctions on a number of Russian and Crimean officials.
- Venezuela – Venezuelan President Nicolás Maduro has accused both the US and the EU of "double standards" over Crimea and recalled the Kosovo and Falkland Islands referendums as evidence.
- Vietnam – The Spokesman of the Ministry of Foreign Affairs Lê Hải Bình said that "the measures need to respect basic principles of international laws and legitimate aspirations of people so that the situation will soon be stable for peace and stability in the region and the world".

=== States with limited recognition ===
- Abkhazia – President Alexander Ankvab stated that he "respects the will of Crimeans, supports and recognizes their momentous choice" and that the referendum "reflects the will of multi-national people of the peninsula".
- Nagorno-Karabakh – Foreign Ministry of the NKR said in a statement on March 17 that the referendum is "yet another manifestation of realization of the right of people to self-determination". On March 18, a concert was held in Stepanakert dedicated to the "self-determination of Crimea" and was attended, among others, by President Bako Sahakyan.
- South Ossetia – Foreign Ministry stated that they "respect the right of population of Crimea to determine independently its fate."
- Transnistria – Irina Kubanskikh, a spokeswoman for the Transnistrian parliament, said that the region's public bodies had "appealed to the Russian Federation leadership to examine the possibility of extending to Trans-Dniester the legislation, currently under discussion in the State Duma, on granting Russian citizenship and admitting new subjects into Russia."

=== European political parties ===
Gábor Vona, leader of Hungary's Jobbik hailed the recent referendum in Crimea as "exemplary". Members of Austria's populist right-wing Freedom Party of Austria, the Flemish nationalist group Vlaams Belang and France's National Front pronounced the referendum free and fair.

== Aftermath ==
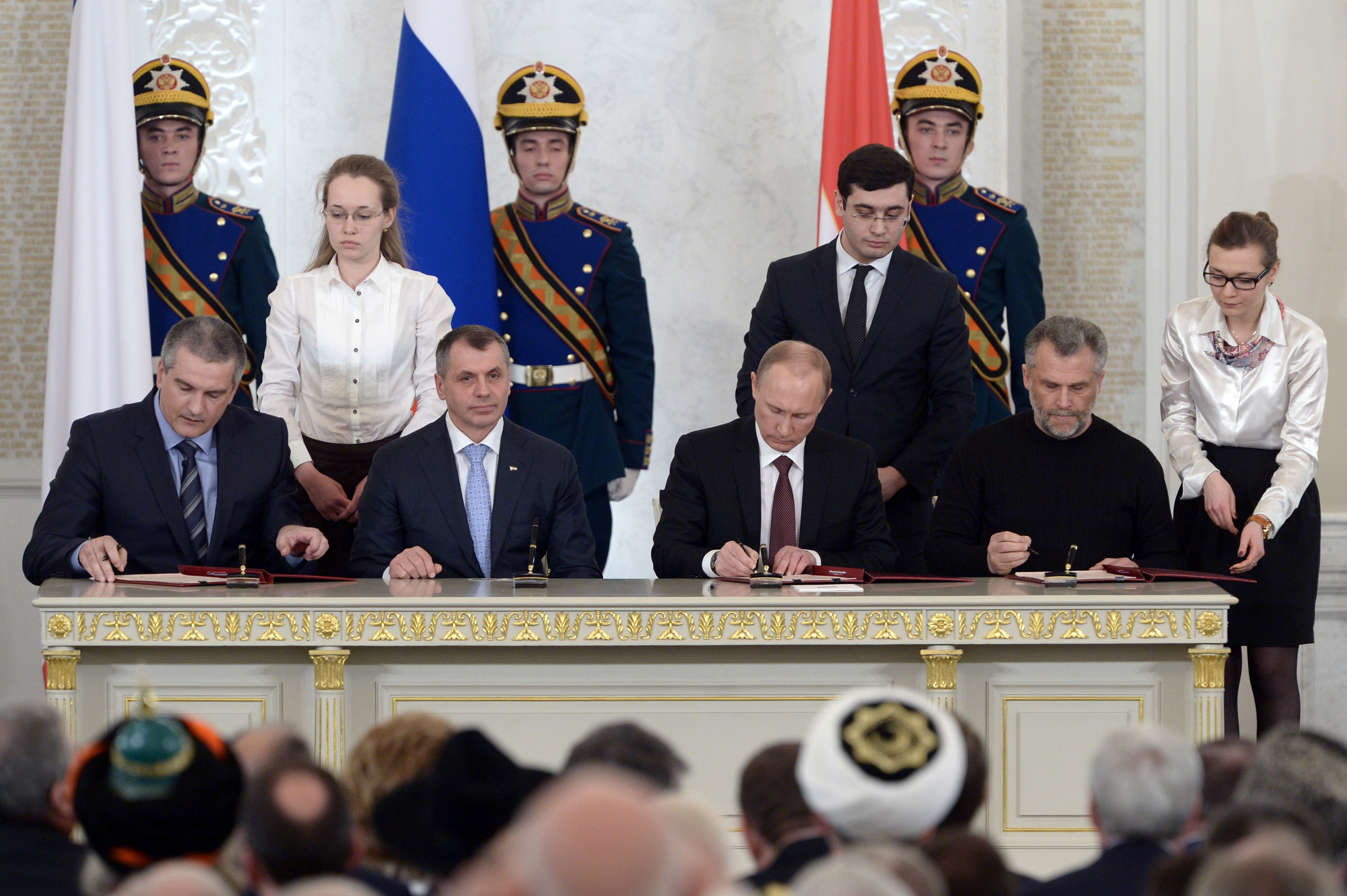
Vladimir Putin (third, left), Sergey Aksyonov (first, left), Vladimir Konstantinov (second, left) and Aleksei Chalyi (right) sign the Treaty on Accession of the Republic of Crimea to Russia

The next day after the referendum, the parliament of Crimea asked the Russian Federation "to admit the Republic of Crimea as a new subject with the status of a republic". Later on the same day, March 17, Putin issued a decree formally recognizing Crimea as an independent state. On March 18, the Russian, Crimean, and Sevastopolian leadership signed the Treaty on Accession of the Republic of Crimea to Russia, which was ratified by the Russian Federal Assembly on March 21. A transition period was in force for integrating Crimean governmental institutions, ending on January 1, 2015.

After the seizure of Ukrainian naval base at Feodosia on March 24, Russian troops have seized most of Ukraine's military bases in Crimea. On the same day, the acting president of Ukraine, Oleksandr Turchynov, ordered the withdrawal of Ukrainian armed forces from Crimean peninsula.

According to a report released on the Russian government-run President of Russia's Council on Civil Society and Human Rights website, Tatars who were opposed to Russian rule have been persecuted, Russian law restricting freedom of speech has been imposed, and the new Russian authorities "liquidated" the Kyiv Patriarchate Orthodox church on the peninsula. The Crimean Tatar television station was also shut down by the Russian authorities.

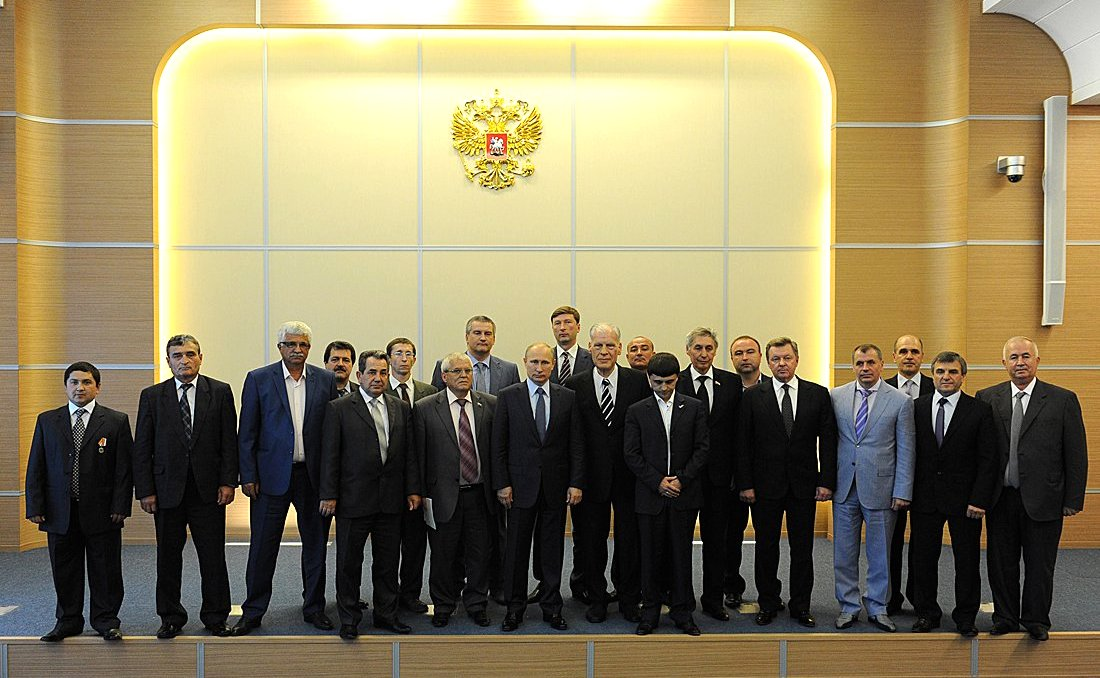
Russian president Putin meeting with representatives of the Crimean Tatars, 16 May 2014

On 16 May the new Russian authorities of Crimea issued a ban on the annual commemorations of the anniversary of the deportation of the Crimean Tatars by Stalin in 1944, citing "possibility of provocation by extremists" as a reason. Previously, when Crimea was controlled by Ukraine, these commemorations had taken place every year. The Russian-installed Crimean authorities also banned Mustafa Dzhemilev, a human rights activist, Soviet dissident, member of the Ukrainian parliament, and former chairman of the Mejlis of the Crimean Tatars from entering Crimea. Additionally, Mejlis reported, that officers of Russia's Federal Security Service (FSB) raided Tatar homes in the same week, on the pretense of "suspicion of terrorist activity". The Tatar community eventually did hold commemorative rallies in defiance of the ban. In response Russian authorities flew helicopters over the rallies in an attempt to disrupt them.

== See also ==
- 2022 annexation referendums in Russian-occupied Ukraine
- 2014 Donbas status referendums
- 1991 Ukrainian independence referendum
- Ethnic Russians in post-Soviet states
- Russian irredentism
- 1991 Transcarpathian general regional referendum
