= Patrick Le Hyaric =

French politician and Member of the European Parliament (born 1957)

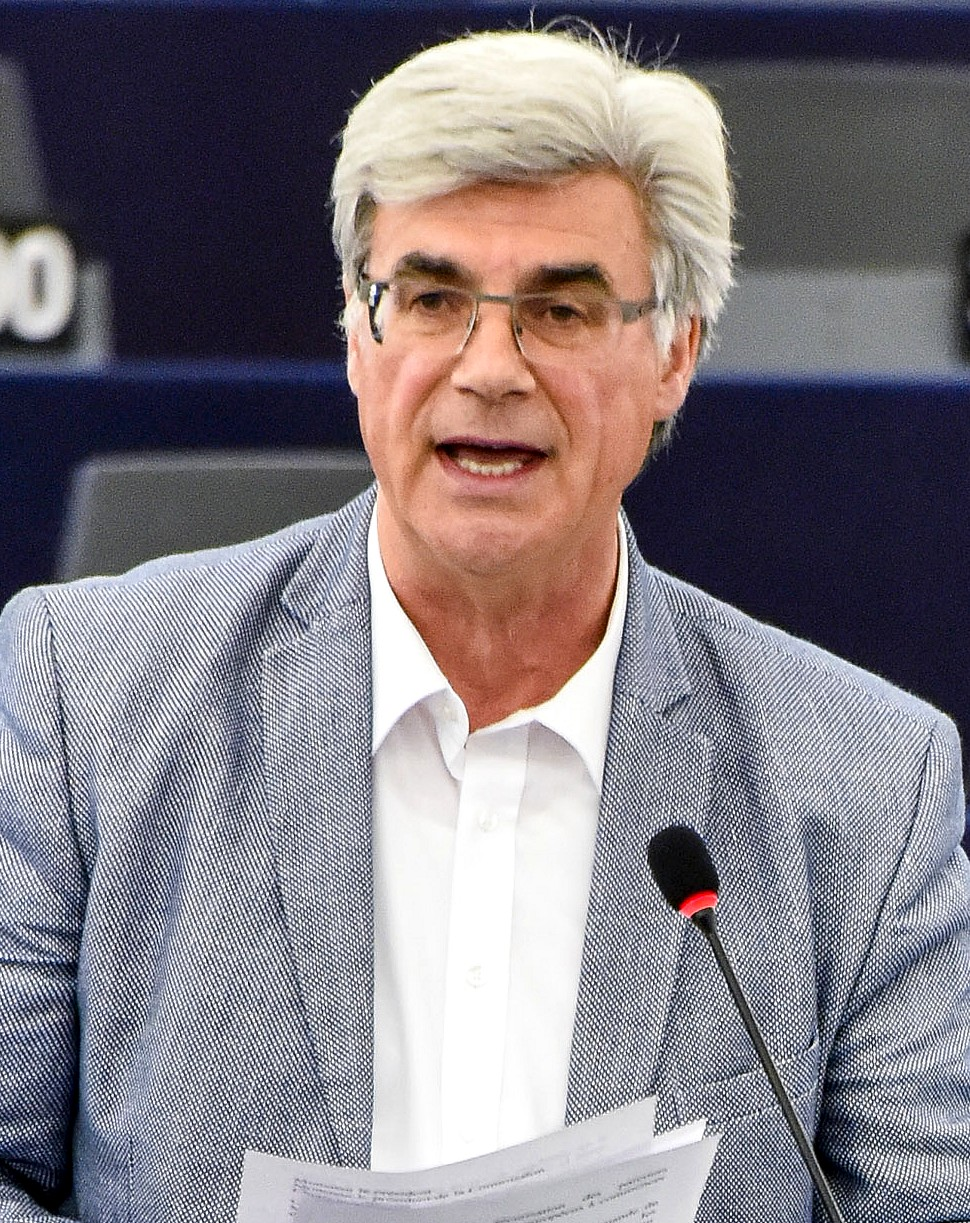
- Le Hyaric in 2017

Member of the European Parliament
- In office 2009–2019
- Constituency: Île-de-France

Personal details
- Born: 4 February 1957 (age 69) Orléans, France
- Party: PCF

Patrick Le Hyaric (born 4 February 1957) is a French politician and Member of the European Parliament (MEP), elected in the 2009 European election for the Île-de-France constituency. He is the director of the newspaper L'Humanité since 2000, when he replaced Pierre Zarka.

Le Hyaric is a member of the executive of the French Communist Party and also the federal secretary of the Communist federation in the Morbihan. In 2004, he led the PCF list in the West constituency. The PCF list obtained 4.1% in the constituency, but no MEPs were elected.

In 2009, he was selected to lead the Left Front list in the Île-de-France constituency ahead of the 2009 European elections. His list won 6.32% of the vote, and he was elected to the European Parliament.
