= Marielle Gallo =

French politician (born 1949)

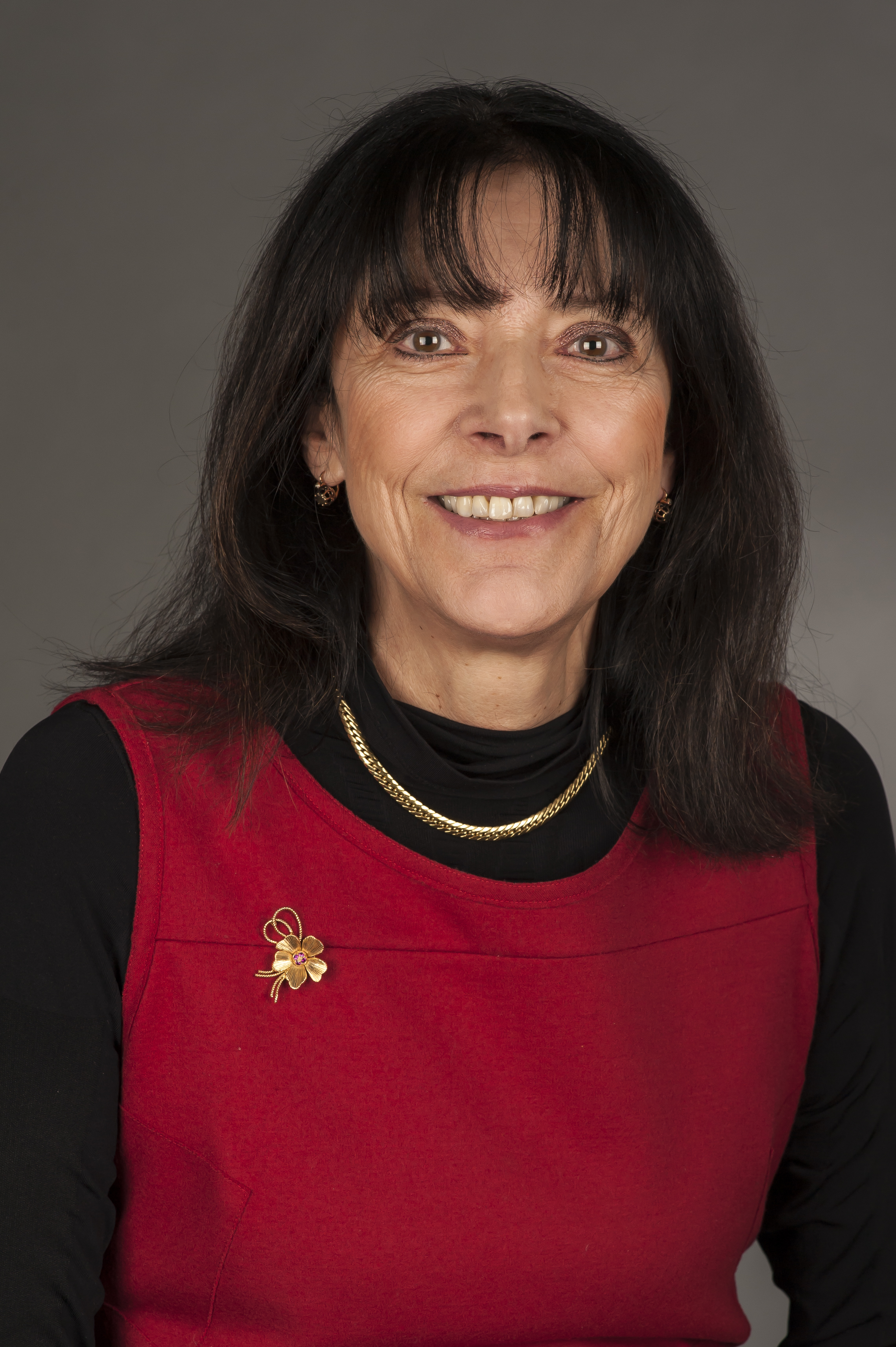
- Marielle Gallo in 2014

Member of the European Parliament
- In office 2009–2014
- Constituency: Île-de-France

Personal details
- Born: Marielle Boullier; 19 May 1949 (age 77) Lons-le-Saunier, France
- Party: UDI; Citizen and Republican Movement
- Spouse: Max Gallo
- Education: Panthéon-Sorbonne University
- Profession: Lawyer

Marielle Gallo (born 19 May 1949) is a French politician and Member of the European Parliament elected in the 2009 European election for the Île-de-France constituency.

Gallo is married to the famous French historian and member of the Académie Française, Max Gallo. She ran in a Parisian constituency in the 1993 election under the colours of the Citizens' Movement. In 2007, she joined the Modern Left, allied to President Nicolas Sarkozy. She became the party's spokesperson.

== European Parliament career ==
In the 2009 European elections, she was the fourth candidate on the Union for a Popular Movement list in the Île-de-France region, and was elected to the European Parliament, where she sits with the Group of the European People's Party. In 2012, she emerged as a proponent of intellectual property rights and online copyright protection.
