= Karima Delli =

French politician (born 1979)

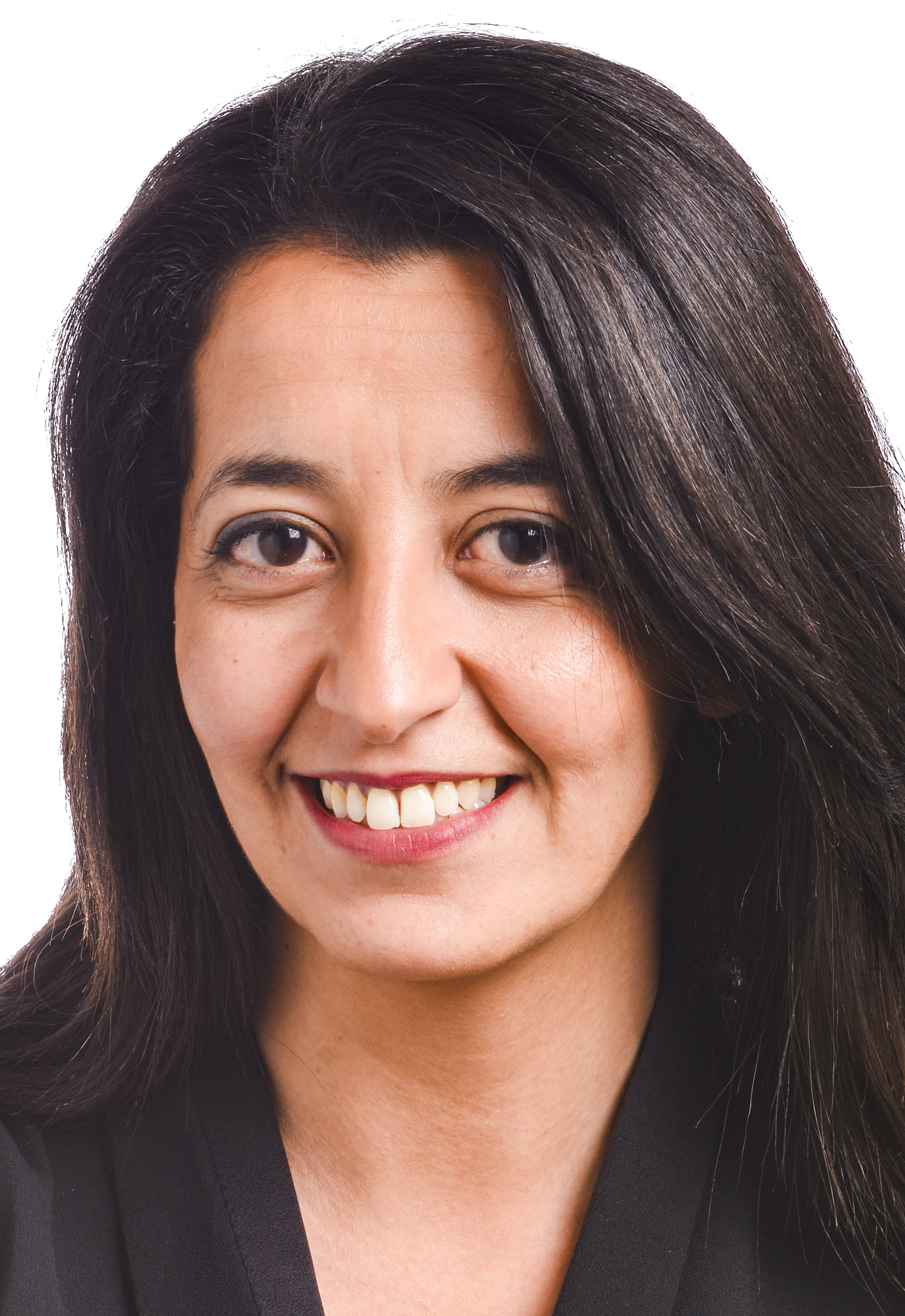

Member of the European Parliament
- In office 14 July 2009 – 15 July 2024
- Constituency: North-West France; Île-de-France (2009-14)

Personal details
- Born: 4 March 1979 (age 47) Roubaix, France
- Party: Europe Ecology – The Greens
- Education: Sciences Po Lille

Karima Delli (born 4 March 1979 in Roubaix, Nord) is a French politician and Member of the European Parliament elected in the 2009 European election, 2014 European elections and in the 2019 European elections for the Île-de-France constituency.

== Early life and career ==
Born to Algerian parents, she grew up in poor conditions in Tourcoing as the ninth child in the family of 13. She obtained a Master of Advanced Studies in political science at the Lille IEP. During this period, she met Green Senator Marie-Christine Blandin, later becoming Blandin's parliamentary assistant.

== Member of the European Parliament, 2009–present ==
Delli is a member of Europe Écologie–The Greens. In the 2009 European elections, she was the fourth candidate on the Europe Écologie list in the East region, and was elected to the European Parliament. She is the second-youngest French MEP after Damien Abad.

In her first term, Delli served on the Committee on Employment and Social Affairs. After the 2014 elections, she moved to the Committee on Transport and Tourism, where she serves as her parliamentary group's coordinator. In 2016, she was made vice-chair of the Volkswagen emissions scandal inquiry into whether the EU should have acted more quickly to address the issue.

In addition to her committee assignments, Delli has been a member of the parliament's delegations for relations with India (2009-2019) and China (since 2019). She is also a member of the European Parliament Intergroup on Extreme Poverty and Human Rights, the European Parliament Intergroup on LGBT Rights. and the URBAN Intergroup.

In June 2023, Delli was the recipient of the Infrastructure, Transport and Mobility Award at The Parliament Magazine's annual MEP Awards.

== Political positions ==
In a letter to President of the European Parliament David Sassoli in late 2019, Delli and Ismail Ertug asked the Parliament to sanction Angel Dzhambazki on the grounds he made xenophobic remarks about them and thereby breached the legislature's code of conduct.

Ahead of the Green movement's primaries in 2021, Delli endorsed Yannick Jadot as the movement's candidate for the French presidential election in 2022.

== Controversy ==
When supporting the ZAD (Zone to Defend) against a motorway near Strasbourg in 2018, Delli was sprayed in the face and mouth with tear gas by the police. She lost consciousness and was unable to attend parliamentary sessions the next day. She said in a statement that she was shocked by the violence of the police.
