= Anne Ferreira =

French politician (born 1961)

Member of the European Parliament
- In office 1999–2009

Personal details
- Born: 18 March 1961 (age 65) Saint-Quentin, France
- Party: Socialist Party
- Profession: Teacher

Anne Ferreira (born 18 March 1961) is a French politician and former Member of the European Parliament for the Île-de-France. She is a member of the Socialist Party, which is part of the Party of European Socialists, and sat on the European Parliament's Committee on the Environment, Public Health and Food Safety.

She was a substitute for the Committee on Civil Liberties, Justice and Home Affairs, a member of the Delegation for relations with South Africa, and a substitute for the delegation to the EU–Kazakhstan, EU–Kyrgyzstan and EU–Uzbekistan Parliamentary Cooperation Committees, and for relations with Tajikistan, Turkmenistan and Mongolia.

== Career ==
- School teacher (1981–1999)
- Vice-chairwoman of the Aisne Departmental Council
- Member of the European Parliament (1999–2009)
