= Neil Melvin =

Neil Melvin is a researcher and policy practitioner in contemporary forms of conflict and the current Director of the Stockholm International Peace Research Institute (SIPRI) Armed Conflict and Conflict Management Programme. He has published on issues of conflict, with a particular focus on ethno-religious issues in the former Soviet Union and in Asia. In recent years he has broadened his research to consider the impact of resources on conflict, notably the issue of energy and conflict.

== Professional life ==
Prior to joining SIPRI, Melvin held Senior Adviser positions in the Energy Charter Secretariat (2008–2010) and for the Organization for Security and Co-operation in Europe (OSCE)'s High Commissioner on National Minorities (2001–2005). He served as a Reader in International Conflict Analysis at the Brussels School of International Studies between 2008 and 2010, and worked at several leading policy institutes in Europe, including the Center for European Policy Studies.

== Education ==
Melvin received his Ph.D in Politics from St. Antony's College, Oxford University, in 1992, and subsequently served as post-doctoral fellow at the Russian Research Center of Harvard University.

== Selected works ==
=== Publications ===
- Engaging Central Asia: The European Union's New Strategy in the Heart of Eurasia (2008)
- Conflict in Southern Thailand: Islamism, Violence and the State in the Patani Insurgency, SIPRI

Policy Paper No. 20 (September 2007).

- Building Stability in the North Caucasus: The way forward for Russia and the European Union, SIPRI Policy Paper No. 16 (April 2007).
- Soviet Power and the Countryside: Policy Innovation and Institutional Decay (Palgrave/Macmillan, 2003).
- Guest Editor of a Special Edition of Helsinki Monitor devoted to Central Asia (November 2003).
- Uzbekistan: Transition to Authoritarianism on the Silk Road (London: Routledge, 2000).
- Nations Abroad: Diaspora Politics and International Relations in the Former Soviet Union (Boulder, Col.: Westview, 1998), editor and chapter contributor "Russians: Diaspora and the End of Empire".
- Regional Foreign Policies in the Russian Federation (London: Chatham House, 1995).
- Russians Beyond Russia: The Politics of National Identity (London: Pinter, 1995).
- Forging the New Russian Nation: Russian Foreign Policy and the Russian-speaking Communities of the Former USSR, Chatham House Discussion Paper, no. 50 (1994).
