= Eurasian Observatory for Democracy and Elections =

Russia-based non-governmental organization

Eurasian Observatory for Democracy and Elections (EODE) is a Russia-based Eurasianist non-governmental organization which on its website claims that it monitors elections. According to its website, it specializes in the "self-proclaimed republics" (Abkhazia, Transnistria, Nagorno-Karabakh). It is led by the Belgian activist Luc Michel and Jean-Pierre Vandersmissen. Both Michel and Vandermissen are followers of the Belgian Neo-Nazi politician Jean-François Thiriart.

Oliver Bullough, writing for The New Republic, reported in 2014 that the organization stated on its website that it shared the values of "the current Russian leadership and V. V. Putin." The organization states that is committed to a multi-polar world and is critical of what it sees as a unipolar world dominated in the twenty-first century by the United States and NATO. It is opposed to the imposition of western values and the identification of the western-style parliamentary system of democracy as a universal norm not open to criticism.

EODE visited Crimea during the 2014 Crimean referendum and claimed that the referendum was conducted in a legitimate manner.

The organization has offices in Moscow, Paris, Brussels, Sochi and Chișinău.
