= Pierre Schapira (politician) =

French politician

Pierre Lionel Georges Schapira
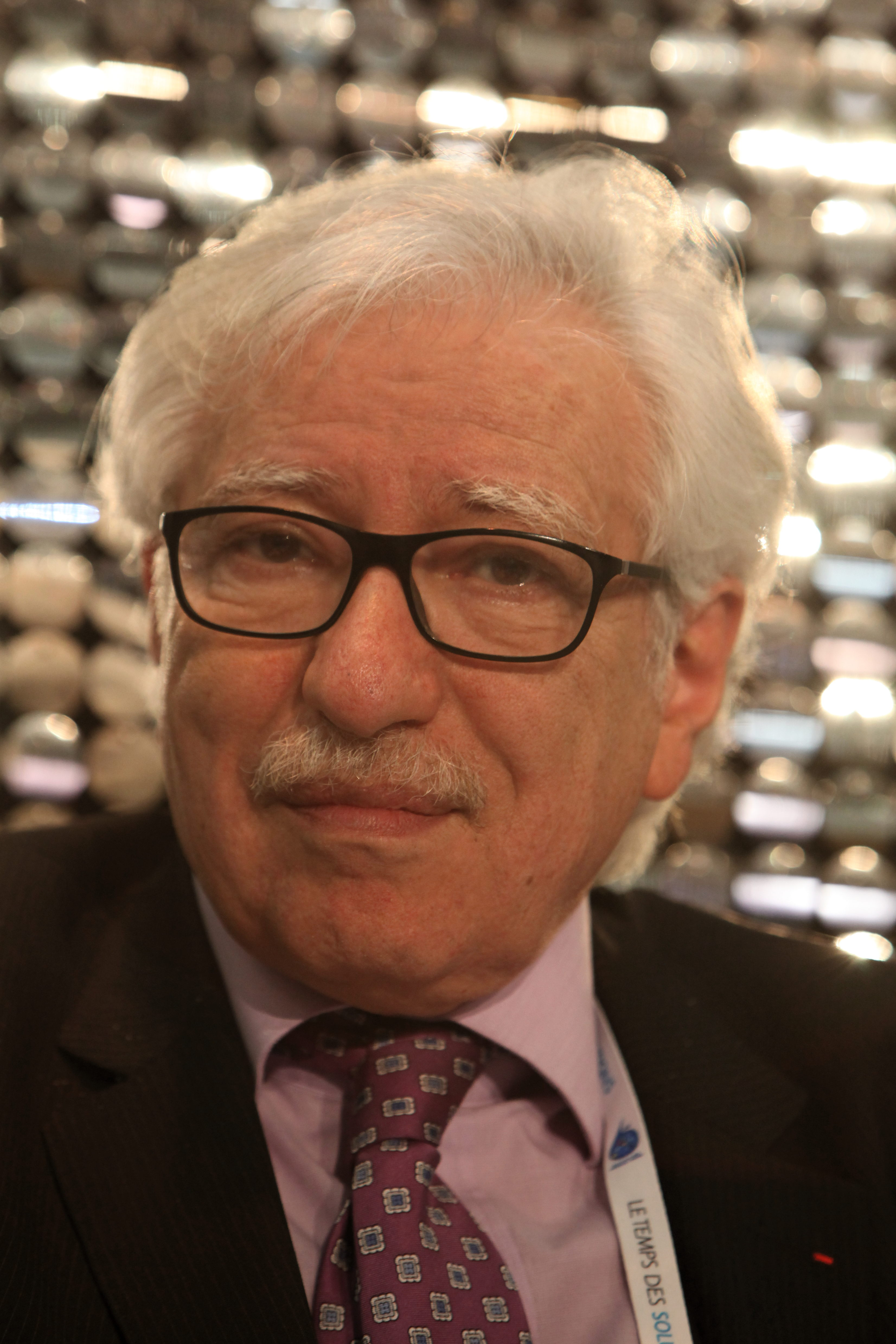
- Born: December 10, 1944 (age 81)
- Occupation: French politician

Pierre Lionel Georges Schapira (born 10 December 1944 in Algiers) is a French politician and Member of the European Parliament for the Île-de-France. He is a member of the Socialist Party, which is part of the Party of European Socialists, and sits on the European Parliament's Committee on Development.

He is also a substitute for the Committee on Foreign Affairs and a member of the delegation for relations with Israel and the ACP-EU Joint Parliamentary Assembly.

== Career ==
- Diploma as dental surgeon (1971)
- Deputy Mayor of Paris with responsibility for international relations and the French-Speaking World
- Former Vice-President of the French Economic and Social Council (1984–2004)
- Former Commissioner, National Commission for Information Technology and Freedoms (CNIL) (1999–2004)
- Officier of the Legion of Honour
