= List of members of the European Parliament for France, 2014–2019 =

Members of the European Parliament from France
| ECSC delegation | (1952) |
| EP delegation | (1958) |
| 1st term | (1979) |
| 2nd term | (1984) |
| 3rd term | (1989) |
| 4th term | (1994) |
| 5th term | (1999) |
| 6th term | (2004) |
| 7th term | (2009) |
| 8th term | (2014) |
| 9th term | (2019) |
| 10th term | (2024) |

This is a list of members of the European Parliament for France in the 2014 to 2019 session.

== List ==
| Name | National party | EP Group | Constituency |
|---|---|---|---|
| Florian Philippot | National Front (until 3 October 2017) The Patriots | NI (until 14 June 2015) ENF (until 2 October 2017) NI (until 3 October 2017) EFDD | East France |
| Sophie Montel | National Front (until 3 October 2017) The Patriots (until 22 July 2018) Independent | NI (until 14 June 2015) ENF (until 2 October 2017) NI (until 3 October 2017) EFDD (until 12 September 2018) NI | East France |
| Jean-François Jalkh | National Front (until 11 June 2018) National Rally | NI (until 14 June 2015) ENF | East France |
| Dominique Bilde-Pierron | National Front (until 11 June 2018) National Rally | NI (until 14 June 2015) ENF | East France |
| Nadine Morano | Union for a Popular Movement (until 29 May 2015) The Republicans | EPP | East France |
| Arnaud Danjean | Union for a Popular Movement (until 29 May 2015) The Republicans | EPP | East France |
| Anne Sander (politician) | Union for a Popular Movement (until 29 May 2015) The Republicans | EPP | East France |
| Nathalie Griesbeck | Democratic Movement | ALDE | East France |
| Édouard Martin | Socialist Party | S&D | East France |
| Alain Lamassoure | Union for a Popular Movement (until 29 May 2015) The Republicans (24 October 2017201) Independent | EPP | Île-de-France |
| Rachida Dati | Union for a Popular Movement (until 29 May 2015) The Republicans | EPP | Île-de-France |
| Philippe Juvin | Union for a Popular Movement (until 29 May 2015) The Republicans | EPP | Île-de-France |
| Constance Le Grip (until 30 November 2017) Geoffroy Didier (from 1 December 2017) | Union for a Popular Movement (until 29 May 2015) The Republicans | EPP | Île-de-France |
| Aymeric Chauprade | National Front (until 10 November 2015) Independent Right (until 12 January 2016) The Free French | NI (until 23 June 2015) ENF (until 9 November 2015) NI (until 17 April 2018) EFDD | Île-de-France |
| Marie-Christine Boutonnet | National Front (until 11 June 2018) National Rally | NI (until 14 June 2015) ENF | Île-de-France |
| Jean-Luc Schaffhauser | Marine Blue Gathering (until 11 June 2018) National Rally (until 12 June 2018) Marine Blue Gathering | NI (until 14 June 2015) ENF | Île-de-France |
| Pascal Durand | Europe Ecology | G/EFA | Île-de-France |
| Eva Joly | Europe Ecology | G/EFA | Île-de-France |
| Pervenche Berès | Socialist Party | S&D | Île-de-France |
| Guillaume Balas | Socialist Party (until 19 February 2018) Genéeation.s, the movement | S&D | Île-de-France |
| Christine Revault d'Allonnes-Bonnefoy | Socialist Party | S&D | Île-de-France |
| Marielle de Sarnez (until 17 May 2017) Patricia Lalonde | Democratic Movement (until 17 May 2017) Union of Democrats and Independents | ALDE | Île-de-France |
| Jean-Marie Cavada | New Centre – Union of Democrats and Independents (until 23 January 2015) We Citizens (until 30 June 2015) Bündnis C (until 1 September 2015) Génération Citoyens | ALDE | Île-de-France |
| Patrick Le Hyaric | Left Front | GUE/NGL | Île-de-France |
| Bernard Monot | National Front (until 5 June 2018) France Arise | NI (until 14 June 2015) ENF (until 28 May 2018) EFDD | Massif Central-Centre |
| Philippe Loiseau | National Front (until 11 June 2018) National Rally | NI (until 14 June 2015) ENF | Massif Central-Centre |
| Brice Hortefeux | Union for a Popular Movement (until 29 May 2015) The Republicans | EPP | Massif Central-Centre |
| Angélique Delahaye | Union for a Popular Movement (until 29 May 2015) The Republicans | EPP | Massif Central-Centre |
| Jean-Paul Denanot | Socialist Party | S&D | Massif Central-Centre |
| Marine Le Pen (until 18 June 2017) Christelle Lechevalier | National Front (until 11 June 2018) National Rally | NI (until 14 June 2015) ENF | Massif Central-Centre |
| Steeve Briois | National Front (until 11 June 2018) National Rally | NI (until 14 June 2015) ENF | North-West France |
| Mylène Troszczynski | National Front (until 11 June 2018) National Rally | NI (until 14 June 2015) ENF | North-West France |
| Nicolas Bay | National Front (until 11 June 2018) National Rally | NI (until 14 June 2015) ENF | North-West France |
| Sylvie Goddyn | National Front (until 11 June 2018) National Rally (until 28 November 2018) Independent (until 30 November 2018) France Arise | NI (until 14 June 2015) ENF (until 19 October 2018) EFDD | North-West France |
| Gilles Pargneaux | Socialist Party | S&D | North-West France |
| Karima Delli | Europe Ecology | G/EFA | North-West France |
| Dominique Riquet | Union for a Popular Movement–Radical Party | ALDE | North-West France |
| Jérôme Lavrilleux | Union for a Popular Movement (until 15 October 2014) Independent | EPP | North-West France |
| Tokia Saïfi | Union for a Popular Movement (until 29 May 2015) The Republicans (until 13 December 2017) Agir, the Constructive RIght | EPP | North-West France |
| Alain Cadec | Union for a Popular Movement (until 29 May 2015) The Republicans | EPP | West |
| Elisabeth Morin-Chartier | Union for a Popular Movement (until 29 May 2015) The Republicans (until 20 February 2018) Independent | EPP | West |
| Marc Joulaud | Union for a Popular Movement (until 29 May 2015) The Republicans | EPP | West |
| Gilles Lebreton | National Front (until 16 July 2014) National Front / Marine Blue Gathering (until 6 November 2017) National Front (until 11 June 2018) National Rally | NI (until 14 June 2015) ENF | West |
| Joëlle Bergeron | Independent | EFDD (until 15 October 2014) NI (until 19 October 2014) EFDD | West |
| Isabelle Thomas | Socialist Party (until 4 December 2017) Genéeation.s, the movement | S&D | West |
| Emmanuel Maurel | Socialist Party | S&D (until 25 October 2018) NI (until 5 November 2018) GUE/NGL | West |
| Jean Arthuis | Union of Democrats and Independents (until 31 August 2017) La République En Marche! | ALDE | West |
| Yannick Jadot | Europe Ecology | G/EFA | West |
| Maurice Ponga | Union for a Popular Movement (until 29 May 2015) The Republicans | EPP | Overseas territories |
| Louis-Joseph Manscour | Socialist Party | S&D | Overseas territories |
| Younous Omarjee | Alliance of the Overseas | GUE/NGL | Overseas territories |
| Jean-Marie Le Pen | National Front | NI | South-East |
| Marie-Christine Arnautu | National Front (until 11 June 2018) National Rally | NI (until 14 June 2015) ENF | South-East |
| Bruno Gollnisch | National Front | NI | South-East |
| Mireille d'Ornano | National Front (until 3 October 2017) The Patriots | NI (until 14 June 2015) ENF (until 2 October 2017) NI (until 3 October 2017) EFDD | South-East |
| Dominique Martin | National Front (until 11 June 2018) National Rally | NI (until 14 June 2015) ENF | South-East |
| Renaud Muselier | Union for a Popular Movement (until 29 May 2015) The Republicans | EPP | South-East |
| Françoise Grossetête | Union for a Popular Movement (until 29 May 2015) The Republicans | EPP | South-East |
| Michel Dantin | Union for a Popular Movement (until 29 May 2015) The Republicans | EPP | South-East |
| Vincent Peillon | Socialist Party | S&D | South-East |
| Sylvie Guillaume | Socialist Party | S&D | South-East |
| Michèle Rivasi | Europe Ecology | G/EFA | South-East |
| Sylvie Goulard (until 17 May 2017) Thierry Cornillet (from 18 May 2017) | Democratic Movement (until 26 March 2017) La République En Marche! (until 17 May 2017) Radical Party (until 25 February 2018) Radical Movement | ALDE | South-East |
| Marie-Christine Vergiat | Left Front | GUE/NGL | South-East |
| Louis Aliot (until 20 July 2017) France Jamet (from 21 July 2017) | National Front (until 11 June 2018) National Rally | NI (until 14 June 2015) ENF | West |
| Joëlle Mélin | National Front (until 12 June 2018) National Rally | NI (until 14 June 2015) ENF | West |
| Édouard Ferrand | National Front | NI (until 14 June 2015) ENF | West |
| Michèle Alliot-Marie | Union for a Popular Movement (until 29 May 2015) The Republicans | EPP | West |
| Franck Proust | Union for a Popular Movement (until 29 May 2015) The Republicans | EPP | West |
| Virginie Rozière | Radical Party of the Left (until 7 February 2018) Radicals of the Left | S&D | West |
| Éric Andrieu | Socialist Party | S&D | West |
| José Bové | Europe Ecology | G/EFA | West |
| Robert Rochefort | Democratic Movement | ALDE | West |
| Jean-Luc Mélenchon (until 18 June 2017) Marie-Pierre Vieu (from 19 June 2017) | Left Front | GUE/NGL | West |

=== References ===
French Members of the European Parliament of 2014, Politiquemania.

Official 'Members of European Parliament'
