= South-East France (European Parliament constituency) =

Former European Parliament constituency

- European Parliament constituency
- Location among the 2014 constituencies

- Shown within France
- Member state: France
- Created: 2004
- MEPs: 13

South-East France was a former European Parliament constituency. It consisted of the regions of Corsica, Provence-Alpes-Côte d'Azur and the former region of Rhône-Alpes (now part of region Auvergne-Rhône-Alpes). Ahead of the 2019 European Parliament elections, it was abolished in favor of a single national vote.

== Members of the European Parliament ==
Election	MEP (party)	MEP (party)	MEP (party)	MEP (party)	MEP (party)	MEP (party)	MEP (party)	MEP (party)	MEP (party)	MEP (party)	MEP (party)	MEP (party)	MEP (party)	MEP (party)
2004	Guy Bono (PS)	Marie-Arlette Carlotti (PS)	Michel Rocard (PS)	Martine Roure (PS)	Gérard Onesta (Greens)	Jean-Luc Bennahmias (Greens /MoDem)	Claire Gibault (UDF/ MoDem)	Thierry Cornillet (UDF/ MoDem)	Patrick Louis (MPF)	Dominique Vlasto (UMP)	Ari Vatanen (UMP)	Françoise Grossetête (UMP /LR)	Jean-Marie Le Pen (NF)	Lydia Schenardi (NF)
2007	Guy Bono (PS)	Marie-Arlette Carlotti (PS)	Michel Rocard (PS)	Martine Roure (PS)	Gérard Onesta (Greens)	Jean-Luc Bennahmias (Greens /MoDem)	Claire Gibault (UDF/ MoDem)	Thierry Cornillet (UDF/ MoDem)	Patrick Louis (MPF)	Dominique Vlasto (UMP)	Ari Vatanen (UMP)	Françoise Grossetête (UMP /LR)	Jean-Marie Le Pen (NF)	Lydia Schenardi (NF)
2009	Marie-Christine Vergiat (FG)	Vincent Peillon (PS)	Sylvie Guillaume (PS)	Michèle Rivasi (EELV)	Malika Benarab-Attou (EELV)	Jean-Luc Bennahmias (Greens /MoDem)	François Alfonsi (PNC)	Gaston Franco (UMP)	Damien Abad (UMP)	Dominique Vlasto (UMP)	Michel Dantin (UMP /LR)	Françoise Grossetête (UMP /LR)	Jean-Marie Le Pen (NF)	13 seats
2014	Marie-Christine Vergiat (FG)	Vincent Peillon (PS)	Sylvie Guillaume (PS)	Michèle Rivasi (EELV)	Marie-Christine Arnautu (NF)	Sylvie Goulard (MoDem)	Dominique Martin (NF)	Bruno Gollnisch (NF)	Mireille d'Ornano (NF/ LP)	Renaud Muselier (UMP /LR)	Michel Dantin (UMP /LR)	Françoise Grossetête (UMP /LR)	Jean-Marie Le Pen (NF)	13 seats
2015	Marie-Christine Vergiat (FG)	Vincent Peillon (PS)	Sylvie Guillaume (PS)	Michèle Rivasi (EELV)	Marie-Christine Arnautu (NF)	Sylvie Goulard (MoDem)	Dominique Martin (NF)	Bruno Gollnisch (NF)	Mireille d'Ornano (NF/ LP)	Renaud Muselier (UMP /LR)	Michel Dantin (UMP /LR)	Françoise Grossetête (UMP /LR)	Jean-Marie Le Pen (NF)	13 seats
2017	Marie-Christine Vergiat (FG)	Vincent Peillon (PS)	Sylvie Guillaume (PS)	Michèle Rivasi (EELV)	Marie-Christine Arnautu (NF)	Thierry Cornillet (REM /MR)	Dominique Martin (NF)	Bruno Gollnisch (NF)	Mireille d'Ornano (NF/ LP)	Renaud Muselier (UMP /LR)	Michel Dantin (UMP /LR)	Françoise Grossetête (UMP /LR)	Jean-Marie Le Pen (NF)	13 seats
2018	Marie-Christine Vergiat (FG)	Vincent Peillon (PS)	Sylvie Guillaume (PS)	Michèle Rivasi (EELV)	Marie-Christine Arnautu (NF)	Thierry Cornillet (REM /MR)	Dominique Martin (NF)	Bruno Gollnisch (NF)	Mireille d'Ornano (NF/ LP)	Renaud Muselier (UMP /LR)	Michel Dantin (UMP /LR)	Françoise Grossetête (UMP /LR)	Jean-Marie Le Pen (NF)	13 seats

== Results ==
Brackets indicate the number of votes per seat won.

=== 2009 ===
European Election 2009: South-East
List	Candidates	Votes	Of total (%)	± from prev.
UMP	Françoise Grossetête Damien Abad Dominique Vlasto Gaston Franco Nora Berra	862,556 (172,511.2)	29.34	+11.63
EELV	Michèle Rivasi François Alfonsi Malika Benarab-Attou	537,151 (179,050.3)	18.27	+10.27
PS	Vincent Peillon Sylvie Guillaume	426,043 (213,021.5)	14.49	−14.13
FN	Jean-Marie Le Pen	249,695	8.49	−3.69
MoDem	Jean-Luc Bennahmias	216,630	7.37	−3.81
FG	Marie-Christine Vergiat	170,074	6.15	
NPA	None	127,420	4.33	
Libertas	None	126,219	4.29	
AEI	None	110,109	3.75	
DLR	None	58,394	1.99	
LO	None	24,727	0.84	
Résistances	None	14,521	0.49	
Europe Démocratie Espéranto	None	4,286	0.15	
Solidarité-Liberté, Justice et Paix	None	4,270	0.15	
Europe décroissance	None	1,110	0.04	
Liberal Alternative	None	626	0.02	
Union des gens	None	617	0.02	
AR	None	606	0.02	
Communists	None	593	0.02	
Pour une Europe utile	None	354	0.01	
La force de la non-violence	None	136	0.00	
Turnout		3,044,003	39.64	

=== 2004 ===
European Election 2004: South-East
List	Candidates	Votes	Of total (%)	± from prev.
PS	Michel Rocard Marie-Arlette Carlotti Guy Bono Martine Roure	791,871 (197,967.75)	28.62	
UMP	Françoise Grossetête Ari Vatanen Dominique Vlasto	490,049 (163,349.67)	17.71	
FN	Jean-Marie Le Pen Lydia Schenardi	336,899 (168,449.5)	12.18	
UDF	Thierry Cornillet Claire Gibault	326,796 (163,398)	11.81	
LV	Jean-Luc Bennahmias	221,332	8.00	
MPF	Patrick Louis	170,074	6.15	
PCF	None	140,097	5.06	
Far left	None	65,630	2.37	
RPF	None	60,124	2.17	
CPNT	None	49,871	1.80	
La France d'en bas	None	45,314	1.64	
Rassemblement des Contribuables Français	None	24,049	0.87	
MNR	None	18,437	0.67	
Workers' Party	None	16,635	0.60	
Vivre mieux avec l'Europe	None	3,896	0.14	
Eŭropo Demokratio Esperanto	None	2,528	0.09	
Alliance pour la Liberté des Peuples d'Europe	None	1,155	0.04	
Diversité pour l'Europe	None	936	0.03	
AR	None	432	0.02	
Parti Fédéraliste	None	212	0.01	
France Unie	None	35	0.00	
Pôle des Libertés	None	35	0.00	
Turnout		2,766,407	40.37	
