= Gilles Lebreton =

French lawyer and politician (born 1958)

Gilles Lebreton MEP
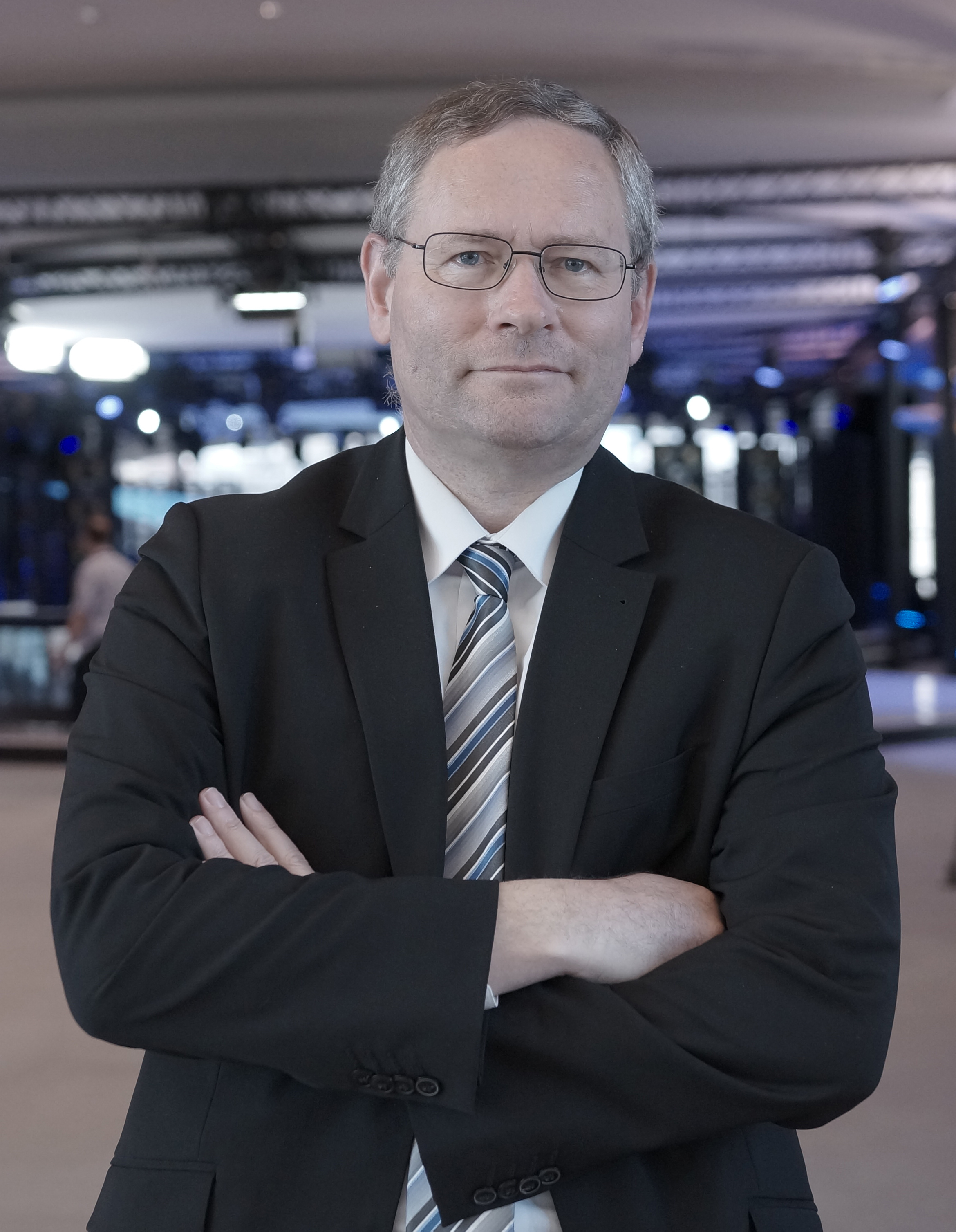

Member of the European Parliament for France
- Incumbent
- Assumed office 1 July 2014

Member of the Municipal council of Montivilliers
- Incumbent
- Assumed office 30 March 2014
- Mayor: Daniel Fidelin

Personal details
- Born: 11 October 1958 (age 68) Brest, France
- Party: National Rally
- Education: Panthéon-Assas University; Paris-Sorbonne University
- Profession: Jurist

Gilles Lebreton (born 11 October 1958) is a French lawyer and politician. A successive member of Sovereignty, Identity and Freedoms and the National Front, which became the National Rally. He has been a municipal councilor for Montivilliers and Member of the European Parliament for West France since 2014.

== Biography ==
=== Education ===
Gilles Lebreton earned a doctorate in public law in 1987 from the University of Paris II. One year later he earned a doctorate of philosophy from the University of paris IV. Lebreton has been an associate professor of public law at the University of Le Havre since 1990.

Between 1995 and 2000, Lebreton was the dean of the university. From 2000 to 2011 he was the director of a research laboratory.

Lebreton has authored 15 legal works in France. He is a Knight in the National Order of Merit and an Officer in the Order of Academic palms.

In 2011, Lebreton resigned from the Research and Studies Group in Fundamental, International and Comparative Law at Le Havre Normandy University after he was appointed as an adviser to Marine Le Pen. That same group of academics elected Lebreton twice as the president of the law section from 2013 to 2017.

== Political background ==
Lebreton first entered politics in France by joining the Rally for France in 2000.

He campaigned for Jean-Pierre Chevènement in the 2002 French presidential election. Lebreton said that he was "disappointed by Chevènement during the 2002 campaign, who abandoned his Gaullist positioning and leftist rhetoric. His right-wing electorate abandoned him. He didn't succeed in creating a left-wing sovereigntism movement, which needed to break with the federalist PS, and he didn't cross the Rubicon."

He was Le Pen's higher education adviser from October 2011 to January 2015. He was a member of the political group since it started in 2012. Lebreton chose to leave the group in 2014. Lebreton had served as the group's vice president from April 2013 until his departure in November 2014. Gilles Lebreton then became a member of the political bureau of the National Front on 1 December 2014. Just one month later, he was one of the territorial delegates for the party at the 13 departments of the Western constituency (West France (European Parliament constituency) (for Bretagne, Pays de la Loire, Poitou-Charentes).

Under the flag of the Rassemblement bleu Marine (RBM), which joins the National Front and the SIEL, Lebreton was a candidate in the 2012 legislative elections and then was elected as a municipal councilor of Montivilliers in March 2014. Two months later he was elected as a member of the European Parliament. After the May 2014 elections, he became a member of the Committee on Legal Affairs and an alternate member of the Committee on Civil Liberties, Justice and Home Affairs.

Lebreton was a member of Marine Le Pen's strategic council for the 2017 French presidential campaign. Then, in autumn 2017, he coordinated small committee that drafted a "simplified treaty" with the aim of building an "alternative to the European Union", evoking a "median path" "between the choice of an unchanged EU and isolated inward-looking nations”. In January 2019, L'Opinion indicated that he "contributed to the new European orientations of the party since the summer of 2017" .

In February 2018, he succeeded Édouard Ferrand as the head of the FN delegation to the European Parliament .

He appeared in 11 ^{e} position on the RN list for the 2019 European elections and was re-elected. He is currently a member of the Committee on Legal Affairs and the Committee on Agriculture and an alternate member of the Committee on Constitutional Affairs.

Gilles Lebreton is the author of a report on the use of artificial intelligence in the military and sovereign domains which was adopted by the European Parliament on 20 January 2021 by 364 votes to 274. In it he recommends in particular to use Lethal Autonomous Weapon Systems (LAWS, known as "killer robots") only as a "last resort", always under human control, and in strict compliance with humanitarian law and the 1949 Geneva Conventions.

== Political line ==
In Public Liberties and Human Rights (2008 edition), Gilles Lebreton says he regrets that some leaders of the National Front quote Carl Schmitt, denouncing the "danger to public freedoms" that the author's thought constitutes and that he calls it a “philosophy of exclusion”. In a 2014 interview, however, he mentions that believes that the National Front "has evolved considerably in recent years" and that it had abandoned the referencing of Schmitt.

In March 2020, as relating to the COVID-19 pandemic, he is the only French signatory of a letter signed by 37 MEPs and addressed to the presidents of the three European institutions, which calls for "postponing new legislation within the framework of initiatives such as the European "Green Deal ".

== Works ==
- Armand Colin, ed. (2008). Libertés publiques et droits de l'homme (in French). Paris. p. 572. ISBN 978-2-247-08120-2..
- Armand Colin, ed. (1996). Droit administratif général (in French). Vol. I. Paris. p. 255. ISBN 2-200-01459-7..
- Armand Colin, ed. (1996). Droit administratif général (in French). Vol. II. Paris. p. 216. ISBN 2-200-01460-0..
- Dalloz, ed. (2021). Droit administratif général (in French). Paris. p. 622. ISBN 978-2-247-20643-8..
- L'Harmattan, ed. (1998). Les Droits fondamentaux de la personne humaine en 1995 et 1996 (in French). Paris. p. 219. ISBN 2-7384-6749-0..
- L'Harmattan, ed. (2000). L'Évolution des droits fondamentaux de la personne humaine en 1997 et 1998 (in French). Paris. p. 249. ISBN 2-7384-9675-X..
- L'Harmattan, ed. (2002). Regards critiques sur l'évolution des droits fondamentaux de la personne humaine en 1999 et 2000 (in French). Paris. p. 289. ISBN 2-7475-2613-5..
- L'Harmattan, ed. (2004). Interrogations sur l'évolution des droits fondamentaux de la personne humaine en 2001 et 2002 (in French). Paris. p. 249. ISBN 2-7475-6635-8..
- L'Harmattan, ed. (2006). Valeurs républicaines et droits fondamentaux de la personne humaine en 2003 et 2004 (in French). Paris. p. 199. ISBN 2-296-01236-1..
- Dir. avec Jean Foyer et Catherine Puigelier (2008). Presses universitaires de France (ed.). L'Autorité (in French). Paris. pp. VIII + 328. ISBN 978-2-13-056632-8..
- L'Harmattan, ed. (2009). Crises sociales et droits fondamentaux de la personne humaine (in French). Paris. p. 280. ISBN 978-2-296-10481-5..
- L'Harmattan, ed. (2011). Sarkozysme et droits fondamentaux de la personne humaine (in French). Paris. p. 338. ISBN 978-2-296-54577-9..
- L'Harmattan, ed. (2013). La Démocratie participative (in French). Paris. p. 268. ISBN 978-2-336-00719-9..
- L'Harmattan, ed. (2014). Crises d'identité et droits fondamentaux de la personne humaine (in French). Paris. p. 279. ISBN 978-2-343-02225-3..
- en collaboration avec J. Bouveresse, C. Puigelier, et C. Willmann (2011). Bruylant (ed.). La Dispute (in French). Bruxelles. p. 262. ISBN 978-2-8027-3491-8.

== See also ==
- List of members of the European Parliament for France, 2014–2019
- List of members of the European Parliament (2014–2019)
- List of members of the European Parliament for France, 2019–2024
- List of members of the European Parliament (2019–2024)
