= Louis Besson =

French politician (1937–2026)

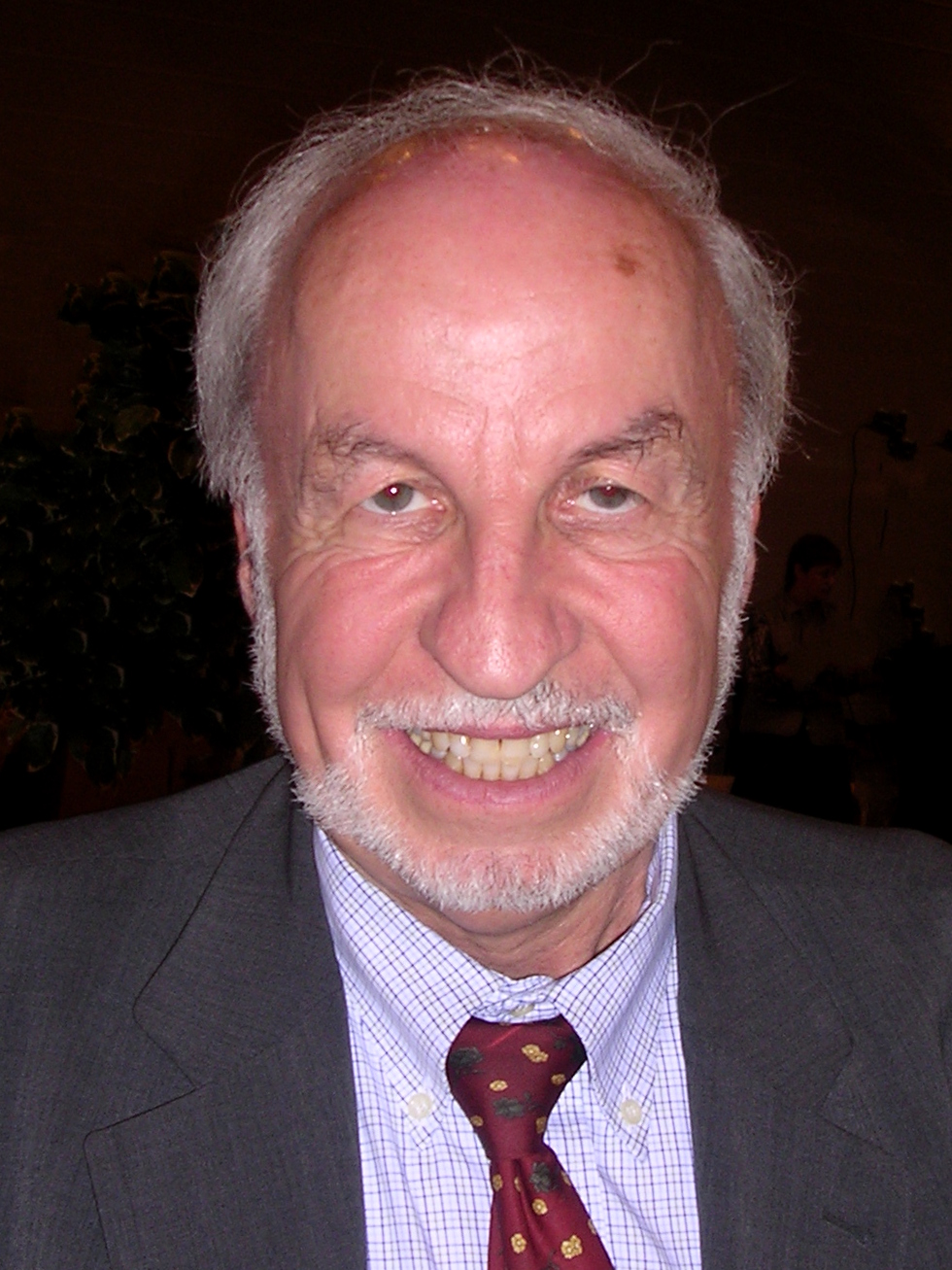
- Besson in 2004

Secretary of State for Housing
- In office 4 June 1997 – 27 March 2001
- President: Jacques Chirac
- Prime Minister: Lionel Jospin
- Preceded by: Pierre-André Périssol
- Succeeded by: Marie-Noëlle Lienemann

Personal details
- Born: 6 May 1937 Barby, France
- Died: 2 April 2026 (aged 88) Chambéry, France
- Party: Socialist Party
- Education: Grenoble Institute of Political Studies

Louis Besson (6 May 1937 – 2 April 2026) was a French politician who was Minister of Public Works, Housing, Transport, and Maritime Affairs from 1990 to 1991 and Secretary of State for Housing from 1997 to 2001. A member of the Socialist Party, he is remembered for two particular policies, a law enshrining the broad right to housing, and for restructuring the rules to require municipalities to meet a minimum level of social housing.

== Early career ==
Louis Besson was born into a staunchly Catholic family on 6 May 1937, in the village of Barby, Savoie, France, of which he was mayor between 1965 and 1989. He then became mayor of the nearby city of Chambéry, from 1989 to 1997, and again from 2001 to 2007. During his time there he built the city's convention centre and library, the latter named after the singer George Brassens. He was president of the Savoie department (1976–1982) and also of the Grand Chambéry urban agglomeration between 2005 and 2014.

== Government minister ==
From 1973 to 1989 he served five terms in the National Assembly. He was Minister Delegate for Housing from 1989 to 1990 and then Minister of Public Works, Housing, Transport, and Maritime Affairs from December 1990 to May 1991 in Michel Rocard's government. He then served as Secretary of State for Housing under Lionel Jospin from 1997 to 2001.

His droit au logement (right to housing) law in May 1990 was something of a landmark, in that it enforced the basic right to housing, by establishing access to housing as a legal principle. It was known as loi Besson, Besson's law. The opening two sentences of the legislation set the parameters: "Guaranteeing the right to housing is a duty of solidarity for the entire nation. Anyone experiencing particular difficulties, notably due to inadequate resources or living conditions, is entitled to assistance from the community, under the conditions set forth in this law, to access and maintain decent and independent housing." He supported local housing integration initiatives during his time in office.

Besson championed traveller rights, notably through the Besson 2 law, implemented in July 2000, which requires municipalities over 5,000 residents to provide designated traveller sites. This reinforced the 1990 legislation to set a target of 30,000 additional plots for travellers over five years. This was not a particularly popular initiative, but as minister he had visited a traveller site to pay condolences to a family that had lost a child through drowning, and that had an impact on his approach to the issue.

He was a joint author of the Solidarity and Urban Renewal (SRU) law of December 2000, whose Article 55 obliges larger municipalities to meet social housing targets. Municipalities over 3,500 residents would need to ensure at least 20% of housing development fell into the category of social housing. This legislation was credited by the law's supporters with enabling one million social housing units, around half of the total residential building programme in France, over the last 25 years, and it still remains part of French housing policy.

== Other campaigns ==
Besson was known for his support for the protection of agriculture in mountain areas, leading the development of the 1985 Mountain Law, which provided protection to upland areas of France and those who work there. He helped to found the National Association of Elected Mountain Officials, and supporting Albertville's successful bid for the 1992 Winter Olympics. He campaigned for the implementation of the Turin–Lyon high-speed railway, and chaired the Franco-Italian intergovernmental commission promoting the project until his death.

In 2014 he retired from all his other public offices.

== Death and legacy ==
Besson died in Chambéry, France, on 2 April 2026, at the age of 88.

He was described as a man of deep humanity. His successor as mayor of Chambéry, and his former chief of staff, Thierry Repentin, said of him: "Louis Besson was incredibly kind, but he never wavered in his convictions, displaying an irresistible force of persuasion." Another former mayor of Chambéry, Michel Dantin, from the opposing Republicans party said: "We had profound differences of opinion, and his convictions led him to make choices of which I disapproved. But I respect the strength and sincerity of his commitment at both the local and national levels, just as I commend his concern for others and his great sensitivity to all forms of distress."

== Recognition ==
Besson was appointed to the rank of knight within the Légion d'honneur in January 1992. He was later promoted to the rank of officer in April 2003 and then to commander in July 2012.
