= Édouard Martin =

Édouard Martin may refer to:

- Édouard Martin (wrestler) (1889–?), French wrestler
- Édouard Martin (playwright) (1825–1866), French playwright
- Édouard Martin (politician) (born 1963), French politician and trade unionist
