= Cornillet =

Cornillet is a French surname. Notable people with the surname include:

- Bruno Cornillet (born 1963), French cyclist
- Gérard Cornillet (born 1947), French writer and translator
- Jean-Charles-Marie Bernard du Cornillet (1759–1792), French religious leader
- Thierry Cornillet (born 1951), French politician
