= Gaston Franco =

French politician

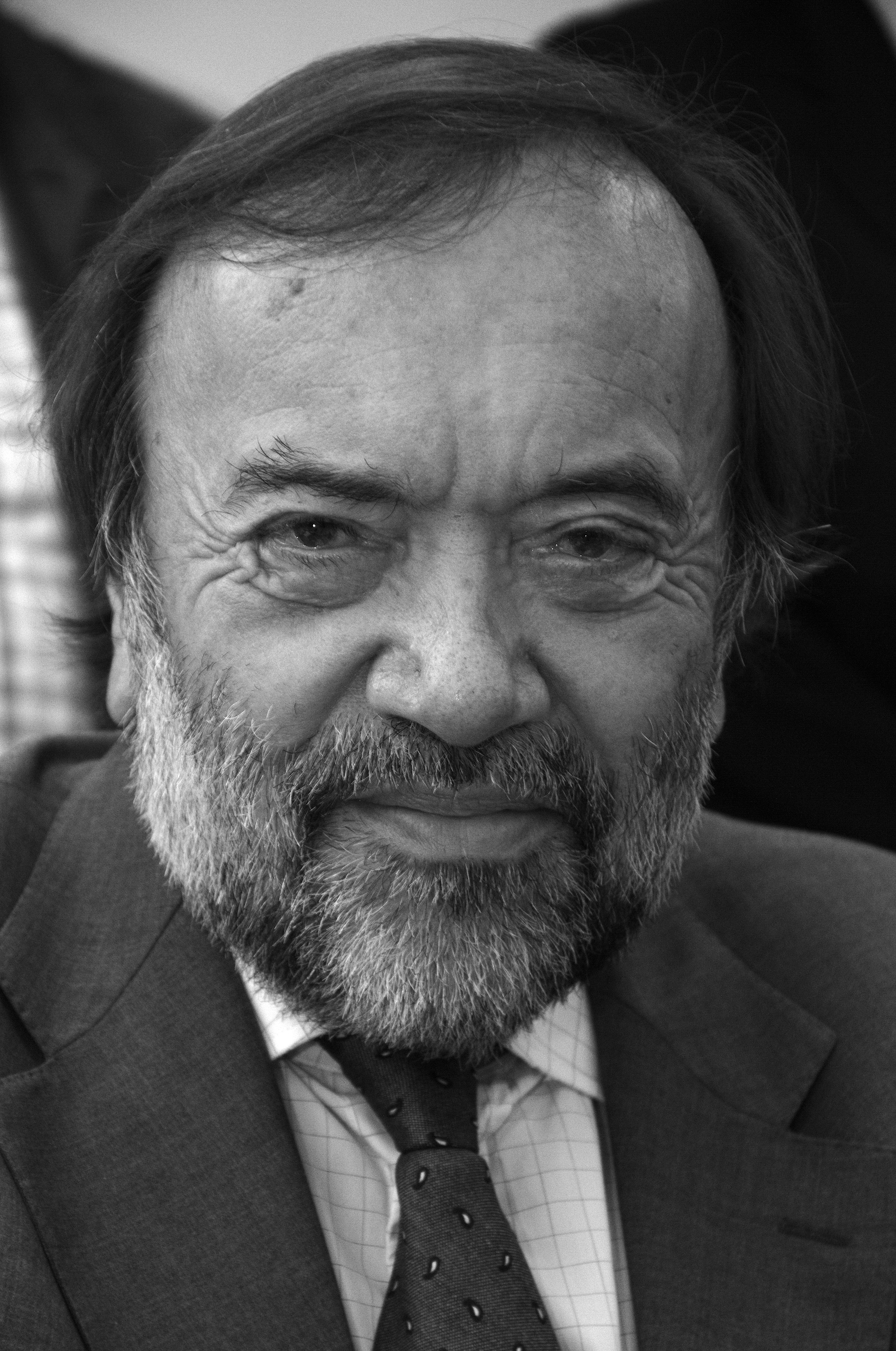
- Gaston Franco in 2013

Member of the European Parliament
- In office 14 July 2009 – 30 June 2014
- Constituency: South-East France

Member of the National Assembly for Alpes-Maritimes's 5th constituency
- In office 1993–1997
- Preceded by: Christian Estrosi
- Succeeded by: Christian Estrosi

Personal details
- Born: 4 February 1944 (age 81); Roquebillière, France
- Political party: RPR; UMP

Gaston Franco (born 4 February 1944 in Roquebillière, Alpes-Maritimes) is a French politician and Member of the European Parliament elected in the 2009 European election for the South-East France constituency.

Franco represented Alpes Maritimes' 5th constituency in the National Assembly as a member of the Rally for the Republic between 1993 and 1997. In addition, he is Mayor of Saint-Martin-Vésubie since 1989 and represented the Canton of Saint-Martin-Vésubie in the General Council until he resigned in 2008 to join the cabinet of the Mayor of Nice, Christian Estrosi.

In the 2009 European elections, he was the fourth candidate on the Union for a Popular Movement list in the South-East region, and was elected to the European Parliament.
