= Dominique Vlasto =

French politician (born 1946)

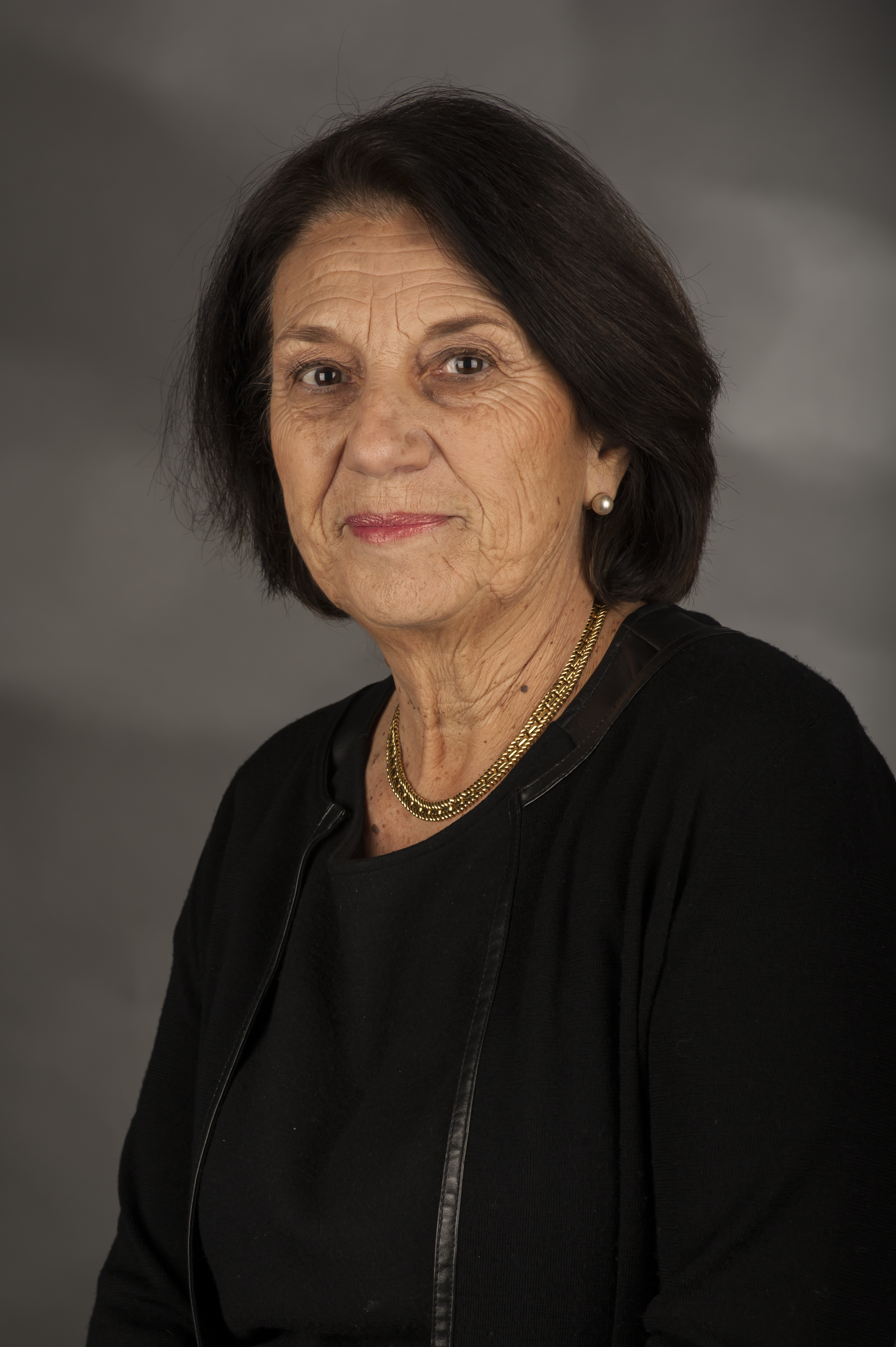

Member of the European Parliament
- In office 1 January 2000 – 1 July 2014
- Constituency: South-East France

Personal details
- Born: 14 August 1946 (age 79) Marseille, France
- Party: Liberal Democracy (until 2002); Union for a Popular Movement (2002–2015); The Republicans (from 2015)

Dominique Vlasto (born 14 August 1946) is a French retired politician who served as a Member of the European Parliament (MEP) from 2000 until 2014. She was a member of the Union for a Popular Movement (UMP), part of the European People's Party (EPP). She was also a Deputy Mayor of Marseille from 1995 to 2020, during the entire mayoralty of Jean-Claude Gaudin.

In the European Parliament, Vlasto served on the Committee on Industry, Research and Energy. She was also a substitute for the Committee on Transport and Tourism, as well as a member of the delegation to the Euro-Mediterranean Parliamentary Assembly.

== Career ==
- Management assistant in a small clothing company (1965–1967)
- Worked at SOFRES (French opinion poll organisation) (1975–1979)
- Member of the France Congrès office (since 1995)
- Chairwoman of the Marseilles Tourist Office and administrator at the Marseilles International Fair limited company
- Member of Marseilles City Council (1983–1989) and district councillor in Marseilles (1989–1995)
- Deputy Mayor of Marseilles with responsibility for building permits and land rights (1995–1998)
- responsibility for tourism, conferences and festivals (since 1999)
- Member of the Committee of the Regions (1998–1999)
- Member of the European Parliament (since 2000)
- The Mayor of Marseilles' representative on the World Water Council
- Chairwoman of the regional association for women and families' activities and information (association under the auspices of the Provence-Alpes-Côte d'Azur Regional Council (1986–1998)
- Member of the administrative council of the Youth and Leisure Social Centre (Marseilles) (since 1997)

== Decorations ==
- Knight of the Order of Merit (1995)
