= Angélique Delahaye =

French agricultural trade unionist and politician (born 1963)

Mayor of Saint-Martin-le-Beau
- In office 5 April 2014 – 28 May 2020
- Preceded by: Didier Avenet
- Succeeded by: Alain Schnel

Regional councillor for Centre-Val de Loire
- In office 22 March 2010 – 28 June 2014
- Preceded by: Francois Bonneau
- Succeeded by: Patricia Boissy

Member of the European Parliament
- In office 1 July 2014 – 1 July 2019

Personal details
- Born: 22 February 1963 (age 62); Lyon, France
- Political party: UMP (until 2015); LR (2015-2020); LMR (from 2020)

Angélique Delahaye (born 22 February 1963) is a French agricultural trade unionist and politician. She was the president of the Fédération nationale des producteurs de légumes (English: National Federation of Vegetable Producers) from 2001 to 2012, and a member of the board of directors of the Fédération nationale des syndicats d'exploitants agricoles (English: National Federation of Agricultural Holders' Unions). She served as a Member of the European Parliament from 2014 to 2019, and was mayor of Saint-Martin-le-Beau from 2014 to 2020.

== Early life and agricultural career ==
Delahaye was born in Lyon and grew up in Soisy-sur-Seine. She started her agricultural career in 1989, running a family vegetable farm with her husband Thierry in Saint-Martin-le-Beau, Touraine. In 1991, she joined the board of directors of the Fédération nationale des producteurs de légumes (FNPL) (English: National Federation of Vegetable Producers), a branch of the Fédération nationale des syndicats d'exploitants agricoles (FNSEA) (English: National Federation of Agricultural Holders' Unions). She became president of the FNPL, and thus a member of the board of directors of the FNSEA, in 2001, holding the position until 2012. Since 2013 she has also been president of Solaal (Association Solidarité des producteurs agricoles et agroalimentaires) (English: Solidarity association of agricultural and agro-food producers), and has received the ranks of Knight and Officer of the Legion of Honour for her work, having been most recently promoted to Officer in July 2021.

== Political career ==
Delahaye entered politics in 2010, supported by Hervé Novelli, with whom she had previously worked when he was Secretary of State for Trade. She was elected a regional councilor for Centre-Val de Loire in the 2010 French regional elections, and subsequently resigned from her position in the FNSEA. In March 2014, she was elected mayor of Saint-Martin-le-Beau at the head of a UMP majority.

In May 2014, Delahaye was elected to the European Parliament, with the support of Bruno Le Maire and Jean-François Copé who campaigned for Brice Hortefeux to make her his running mate.

In January 2020, Delahaye announced she would be running for a second term as mayor of Saint-Martin-le-Beau. She was defeated by Alain Schnel in the first round of voting in March, receiving 39.03% of votes.
