= Malika Benarab-Attou =

French politician

Malika Benarab-Attou (born 25 March 1963 in Aïn Benian, Algeria) is a French politician and Member of the European Parliament elected in the 2009 European election for the South-East France constituency.

Malika Benarab-Attou joined The Greens in 2003. In the 2009 European elections, she was the third candidate on the Europe Écologie list (the Greens) in the South-East region, and was elected to the European Parliament.

Dismissed by the French Greens for the European elections of 2014, she announced in January 2014 that she would join Nouvelle Donne to try to be reelected.
