= Thierry Repentin =

French politician (born 1963)

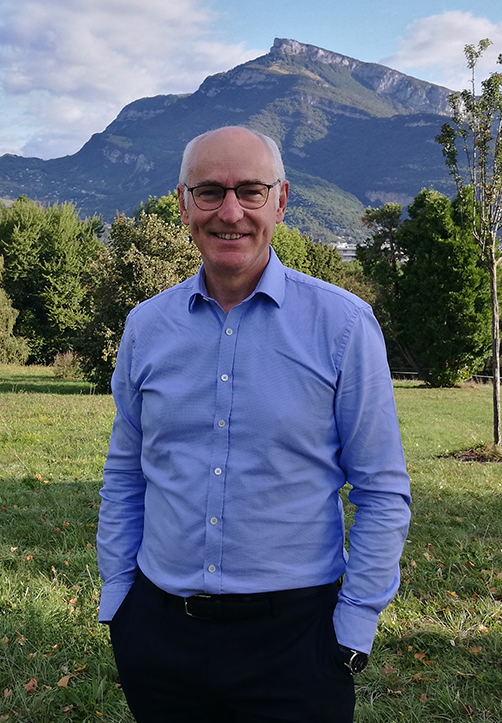

Mayor of Chambéry
- Incumbent
- Assumed office 4 July 2020
- Preceded by: Michel Dantin

Minister Delegate for European Affairs
- In office 19 March 2013 – 2 April 2014
- Prime Minister: Jean-Marc Ayrault
- Preceded by: Bernard Cazeneuve
- Succeeded by: Harlem Désir (Secretary of State)

Minister Delegate for Vocational Training and Apprenticeship
- In office 21 June 2012 – 19 March 2013
- Prime Minister: Jean-Marc Ayrault
- Preceded by: Nadine Morano (indirectly)
- Succeeded by: Clotilde Valter (Secretary of State, indirectly)

Senator for Savoie
- In office 2 May 2014 – 30 September 2014
- In office 1 October 2004 – 22 July 2012

Member of the Regional Council of Auvergne-Rhône-Alpes
- In office 4 January 2016 – 27 June 2021

Personal details
- Born: Thierry Jean Michel Repentin; 5 April 1963 (age 63) Saint-Pierre-d'Albigny, France
- Party: Socialist Party (1995–2019); Miscellaneous left (2019–present)
- Education: Sciences Po Grenoble

Thierry Jean Michel Repentin (French pronunciation: [tjɛʁi ʀəpɑ̃tɛ̃]; born 5 April 1963) is a French politician who has served as Mayor of Chambéry since 2020. A member of the Socialist Party (PS), he previously served as a Senator for Savoie (2004–2012; 2014) and in government as Minister Delegate for Vocational Training and Apprenticeship (2012–2013) and for European Affairs (2013–2014) under Prime Minister Jean-Marc Ayrault.

== Biography ==
=== Early life ===
Thierry Repentin was born in Saint-Pierre-d'Albigny and grew up in Saint-Jean-de-la-Porte. He was educated in Chambéry and graduated from the Grenoble Institute of Political Studies in Grenoble.

=== Career ===
Repentin first worked as a parliamentary assistant to MEP Jean-Pierre Cot, before he served as chief of staff to Louis Besson from 1989 to 1995 during the first years of Besson's tenure as Mayor of Chambéry. Repentin later became an assistant of Besson when he was Secretary of State for Housing under Prime Minister Lionel Jospin from 1997 to 2001.

From 1995 to 2001, Repentin also served as a Deputy Mayor of Chambéry. From 2008 to 2014, he served as a Deputy Mayor of Sonnaz. He held a seat in the Departmental Council of Savoie (General Council of Savoie until 2015) from 1998 to 2020, first for the canton of Chambéry-Nord, then for the canton of Chambéry-1 starting in 2015 following redistricting. From 2001 to 2004, Repentin also held the presidency of Chambéry Métropole, a former agglomeration community centred around Chambéry.

He served as a member of the Senate, representing the Savoie department, from 2004 to 2012, when he was appointed to the government as Minister Delegate for Vocational Training and Apprenticeship under Prime Minister Jean-Marc Ayrault. In 2013, he was appointed Minister Delegate for European Affairs. He briefly returned to the Senate in 2014 after Manuel Valls was appointed prime minister. He stood for reelection later that year but was defeated.

From 2016 until 2021, Repentin was a member of the Regional Council of Auvergne-Rhône-Alpes. In 2020, he was elected Mayor of Chambéry.

== Honours ==
- 14 November 2013: Grand Officer of the Order of Saint-Charles
- 14 July 2015: Knight of the Legion of Honour
