= Nora Berra =

French politician

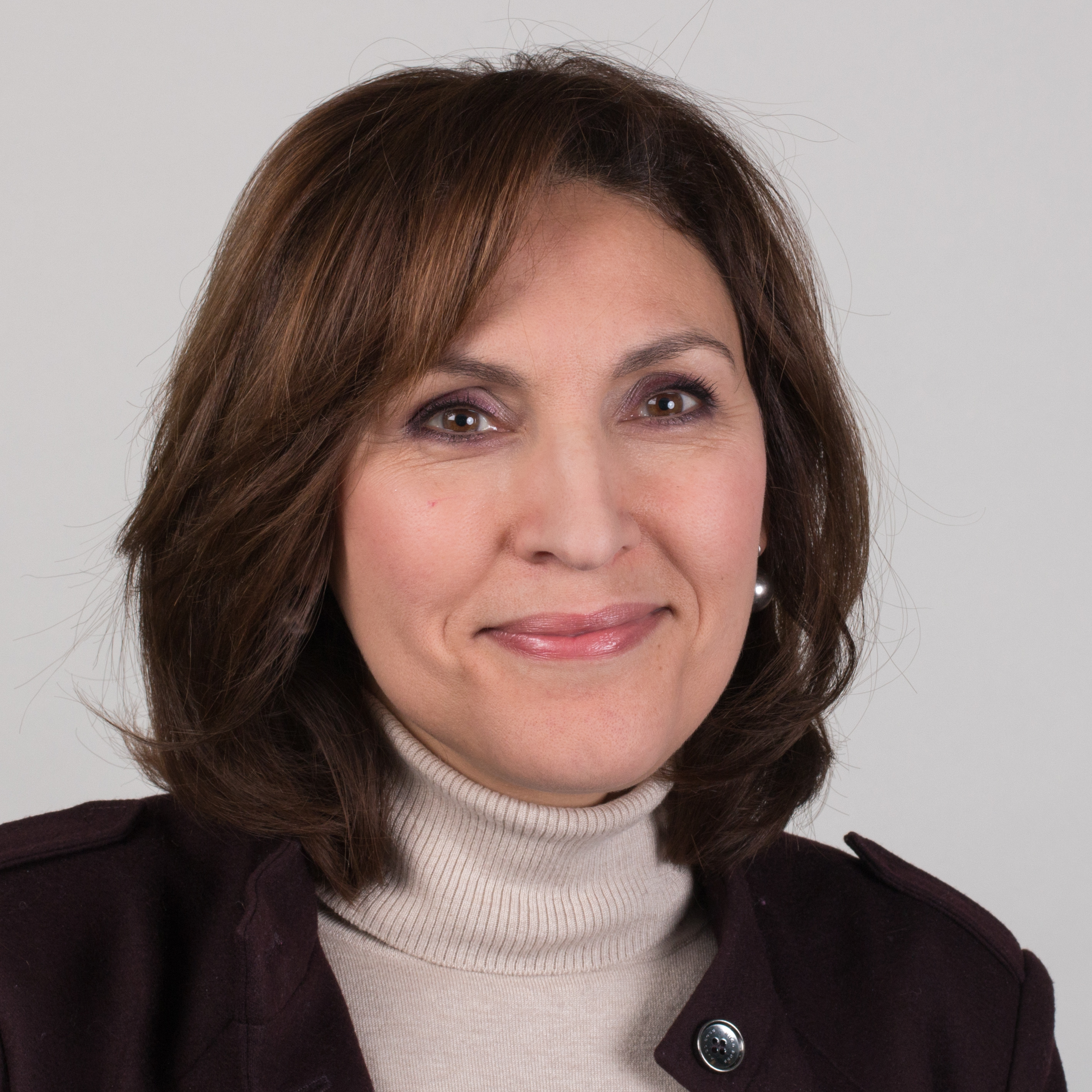

French Secretary of Health
- In office 2010–2012
- President: Nicolas Sarkozy
- Prime Minister: François Fillon
- Preceded by: Roselyne Bachelot
- Succeeded by: Marisol Touraine

Regional councillors of Auvergne-Rhône-Alpes
- Incumbent
- Assumed office 4 January 2016
- President: Laurent Wauquiez

Municipal councillor of Lyon
- Incumbent
- Assumed office 16 March 2008

Member of the European Parliament
- In office 2009–2014
- Preceded by: Michel Dantin

Personal details
- Born: 21 January 1963 (age 63) Lyon, France
- Party: UMP (2002–2015); LR (2015–2017)
- Education: Lycée Ampère
- Alma mater: Oran 1 University
- Profession: Physician

Nora Berra (born 21 January 1963) is a French physician and politician who served as Secretary of State for Seniors (2009–2010) and as Secretary of State for Health (2010–2012) in the government of Prime Minister François Fillon from 14 November 2010 to 10 May 2012. From 2015 until 2017, she was a member of the Republicans.

== Early life and education ==
Born as the daughter of an Algerian soldier and an Algerian mother, She was 5th child in a family of 11, Berra was raised in a Gaullist family.

Berra studied at the Collège-lycée Ampère, before continuing with medicine in Oran. In 1994 and 1996, she gave birth to her two children.

== Early career ==
Between 1999 and 2009, Berra worked in various pharmaceutical laboratories around Lyon, including Boehringer Ingelheim (1999–2001) and Bristol Myers Squibb (2001–2006), where she conducted research on cervical cancer and Hepatitis B.

== Political career ==
From 2001 until 2008, Berra was a municipal councillor in Neuville-sur-Saône, at which point she was elected to the Municipal Council of Lyon.

In the June 2009 European elections, Berra was fifth on the UMP list in South-East France, and was elected to the European Parliament for the French South-East constituency. She eventually decided against taking up her seat, instead joining the government of Prime Minister François Fillon.

On June 23, 2009, Berra entered Fillon's government as Secretary of State for the Elderly, under the leadership of successive ministers Xavier Darcos and Éric Woerth at the Ministry of Labour, Social Relations, Family and Solidarity.

On November 14, 2010, Berra was promoted to state secretary for health after a cabinet shift, this time under minister Xavier Bertrand.

Following her departure from government, Berra was a Member of the European Parliament from 2012 until 2014. In parliament, she served on the Committee on International Trade. In addition to her committee assignments, she was part of the parliament's Delegation for relations with the Palestinian Legislative Council.

Running for the Union for a Popular Movement primary election for the municipal election of Lyon of 2014, Berra was eliminated in the first round June 2, 2013 by uniting 9.41% of the vote. She was elected in 2015 as a member of the Regional Council of Auvergne-Rhône-Alpes on a list led by Laurent Wauquiez.

In the Republicans' 2016 primaries, Berra publicly endorsed Nicolas Sarkozy as the party's candidate for the 2017 French presidential election; when Sarkozy was eliminated in the first round, she supported François Fillon instead. When Laurent Wauquiez won the Republicans' 2017 leadership election, she left the party in protest.

In the 2019 European Parliament election, Berra was a candidate for the Union of Democrats and Independents (UDI).

Ahead of the 2022 presidential elections, Berra publicly declared her support for incumbent Emmanuel Macron and criticized the Republicans’ candidate Valérie Pécresse.
