= Mireille d'Ornano =

French politician (born 1951)

Mireille d'Ornano MEP
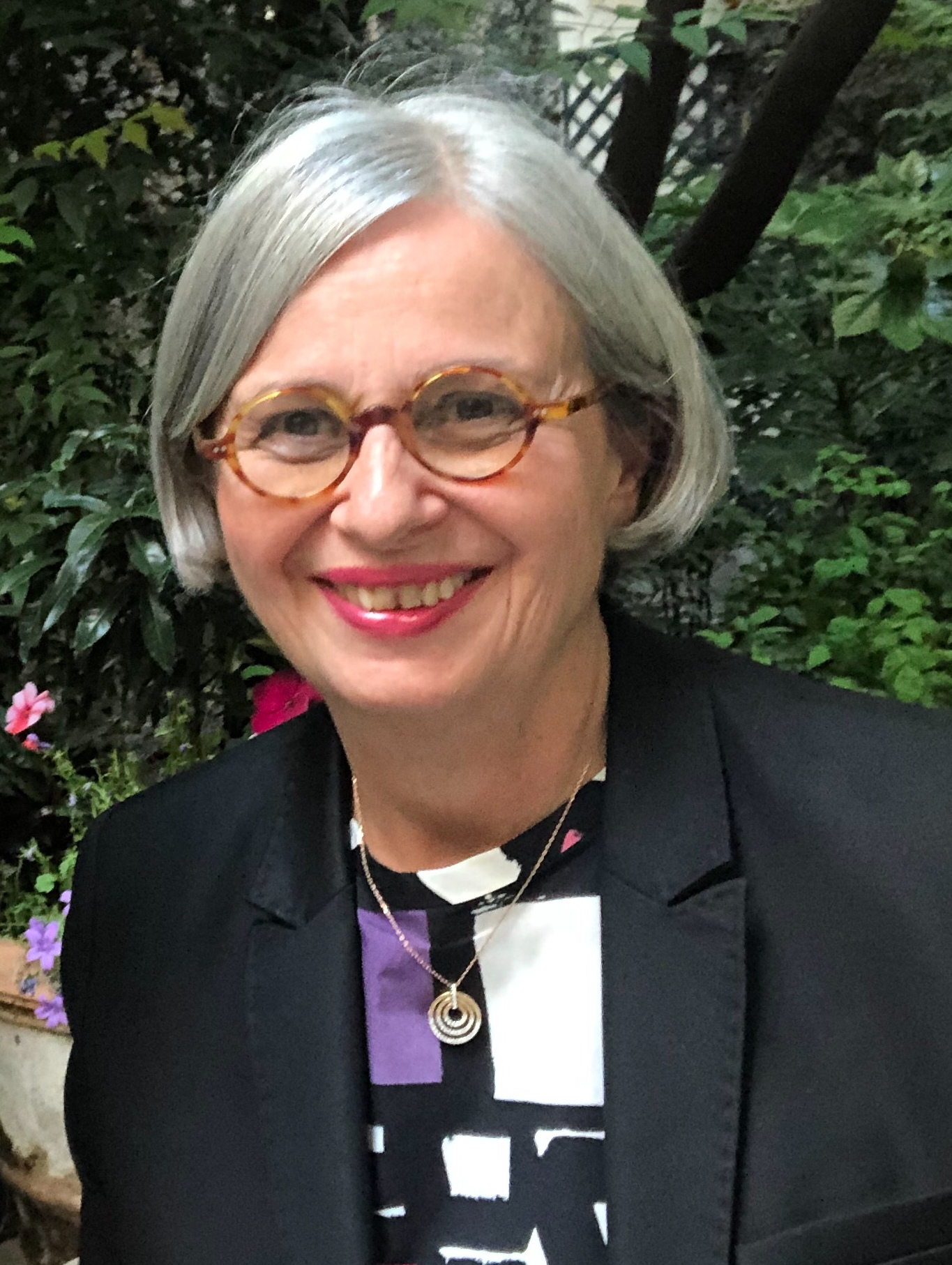
- Mireille d'Ornano in 2019.

Member of the European Parliament for South-East France
- In office 1 July 2014 – 1 July 2019

Member of the Municipal council of Grenoble
- In office 5 April 2014 – 28 June 2020
- Mayor: Éric Piolle

Personal details
- Born: 29 June 1951 (age 74) Angoulême, France
- Party: National Front (1999-2017); The Patriots (since 2017)

Mireille d'Ornano (born 29 June 1951) is a French politician who is a member of The Patriots. Between 2014 and 2020, she was a National Front Member of the European Parliament representing South-East France.
