= Guy Bono =

French MEP

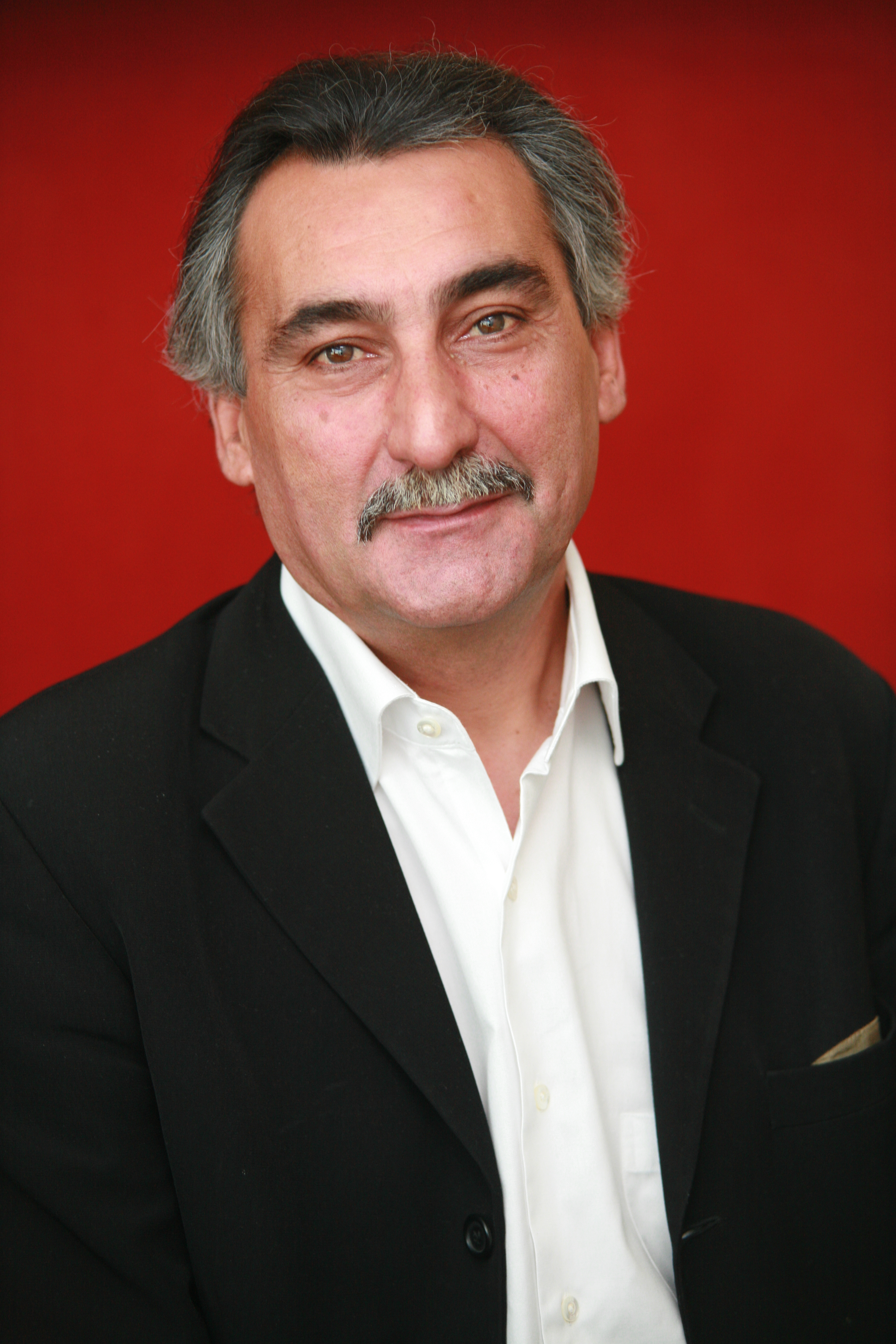
Guy Bono (2006)

Guy Bono (born 30 April 1953 in Béja, Béja Governorate, Tunisia) is a French politician and Member of the European Parliament for the south-east of France. He is a member of the Socialist Party, which is part of the Party of European Socialists, and sits on the European Parliament's Committee on Culture and Education.

He is a substitute for the Committee on Transport and Tourism, a member of the delegation to the EU–Mexico Joint Parliamentary Committee, and a substitute for the delegation for relations with the countries of Central America.

== Career ==
- Diploma in chemistry, National Centre for Industrial Arts and Crafts (CNAM)
- Director of cultural affairs, Department of Bouches-du-Rhône (1983-1992)
- Director of cultural affairs for the Fos-Istres-Miramas new urban area grouping (1992-1998)
- Local authority manager
- Member of the Socialist Party national council
- Member of the Socialist Party's national bureau
- Member of the Socialist Party's national secretariat
- Vice-Chairman of the Provence-Alpes-Côte d'Azur Regional Council
