= Saint-Martin-le-Beau =

- Commune
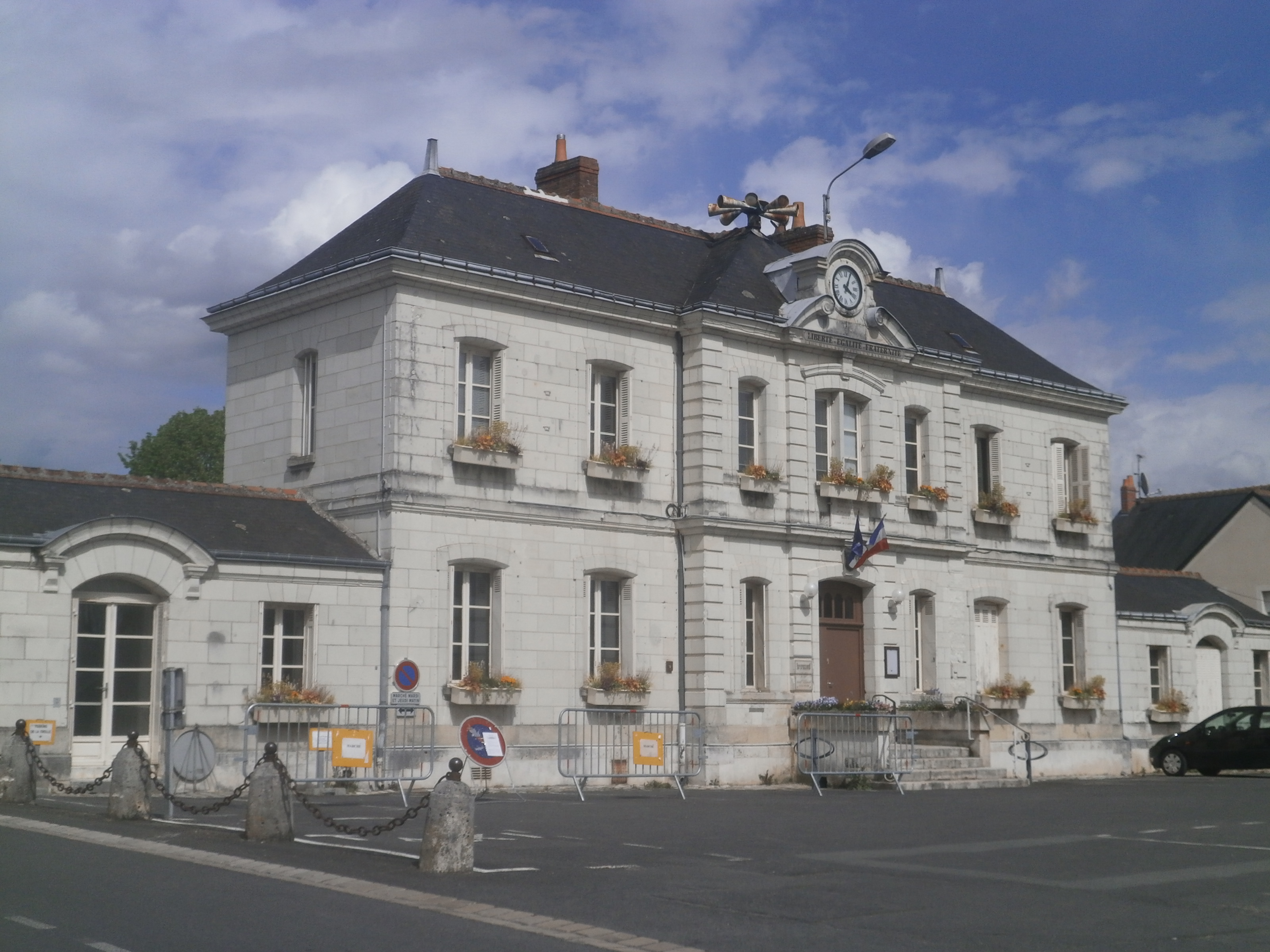
- St-Martin-le-Beau Town hall

- Coat of arms
- Location of Saint-Martin-le-Beau
- Location within France Location within Centre-Val de Loire
- Coordinates: 47°21′24″N 0°54′37″E
- Country: France
- Region: Centre-Val de Loire
- Department: Indre-et-Loire
- Arrondissement: Loches
- Canton: Bléré
- Intercommunality: CC Autour de Chenonceaux Bléré-Val de Cher

Government
  - Mayor (2020–2026): Alain Schnel
- Area^{1}: 18.44 km^{2} (7.12 sq mi)
- Highest elevation: 108 m (354 ft)
- Lowest elevation: 49 m (161 ft)
- Population (2023): 3,216
  - Density: 174.4/km^{2} (451.7/sq mi)
- Time zone: UTC+01:00 (CET)
  - Summer (DST): UTC+02:00 (CEST)
- INSEE/Postal code: 37225 /37270
- ^{1} French Land Register data, which excludes lakes, ponds, glaciers > 1 km^{2} (0.386 sq mi or 247 acres) and river estuaries.

Saint-Martin-le-Beau (French pronunciation: [sɛ̃ maʁtɛ̃ lə bo]) is a commune in the Indre-et-Loire department in central France.

== Population ==
Historical population

Year	Pop.	±% p.a.
1793	1,206	—
1800	1,298	+1.06%
1806	1,323	+0.32%
1821	1,445	+0.59%
1831	1,406	−0.27%
1836	1,422	+0.23%
1841	1,345	−1.11%
1846	1,353	+0.12%
1851	1,379	+0.38%
1856	1,340	−0.57%
1861	1,341	+0.01%
1866	1,297	−0.67%
1872	1,323	+0.33%
1876	1,331	+0.15%
1881	1,368	+0.55%
1886	1,408	+0.58%
1891	1,296	−1.64%
1896	1,288	−0.12%
1901	1,207	−1.29%

Year	Pop.	±% p.a.
1906	1,239	+0.52%
1911	1,212	−0.44%
1921	1,133	−0.67%
1926	1,127	−0.11%
1931	1,030	−1.78%
1936	1,067	+0.71%
1946	1,159	+0.83%
1954	1,130	−0.32%
1962	1,106	−0.27%
1968	1,220	+1.65%
1975	1,403	+2.02%
1982	2,051	+5.57%
1990	2,427	+2.13%
1999	2,481	+0.24%
2007	2,641	+0.78%
2012	3,101	+3.26%
2017	3,156	+0.35%
2023	3,216	+0.31%

Source: EHESS and INSEE (1968-2023)

== See also ==
- Communes of the Indre-et-Loire department
