= Édouard Martin (politician) =

Spanish-born French politician (born 1963)

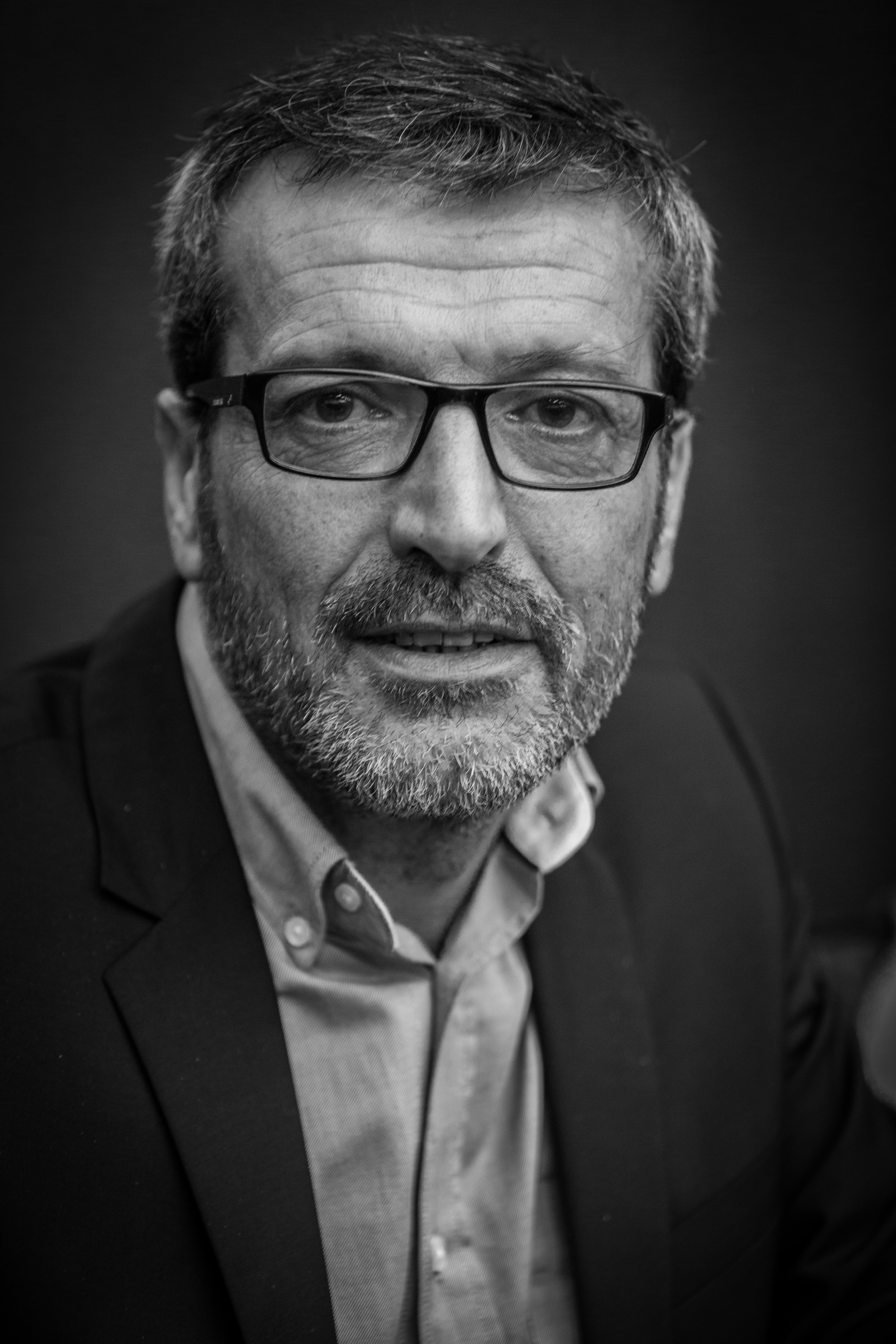
Édouard Martin in 2014.

Édouard Martin (born 15 June 1963) is a Spanish-born French politician from the Socialist Party. He was a Member of the European Parliament from 2014 to 2019.

== See also ==
- List of members of the European Parliament for France, 2014–2019
