= Florian Philippot =

French politician (born 1981)

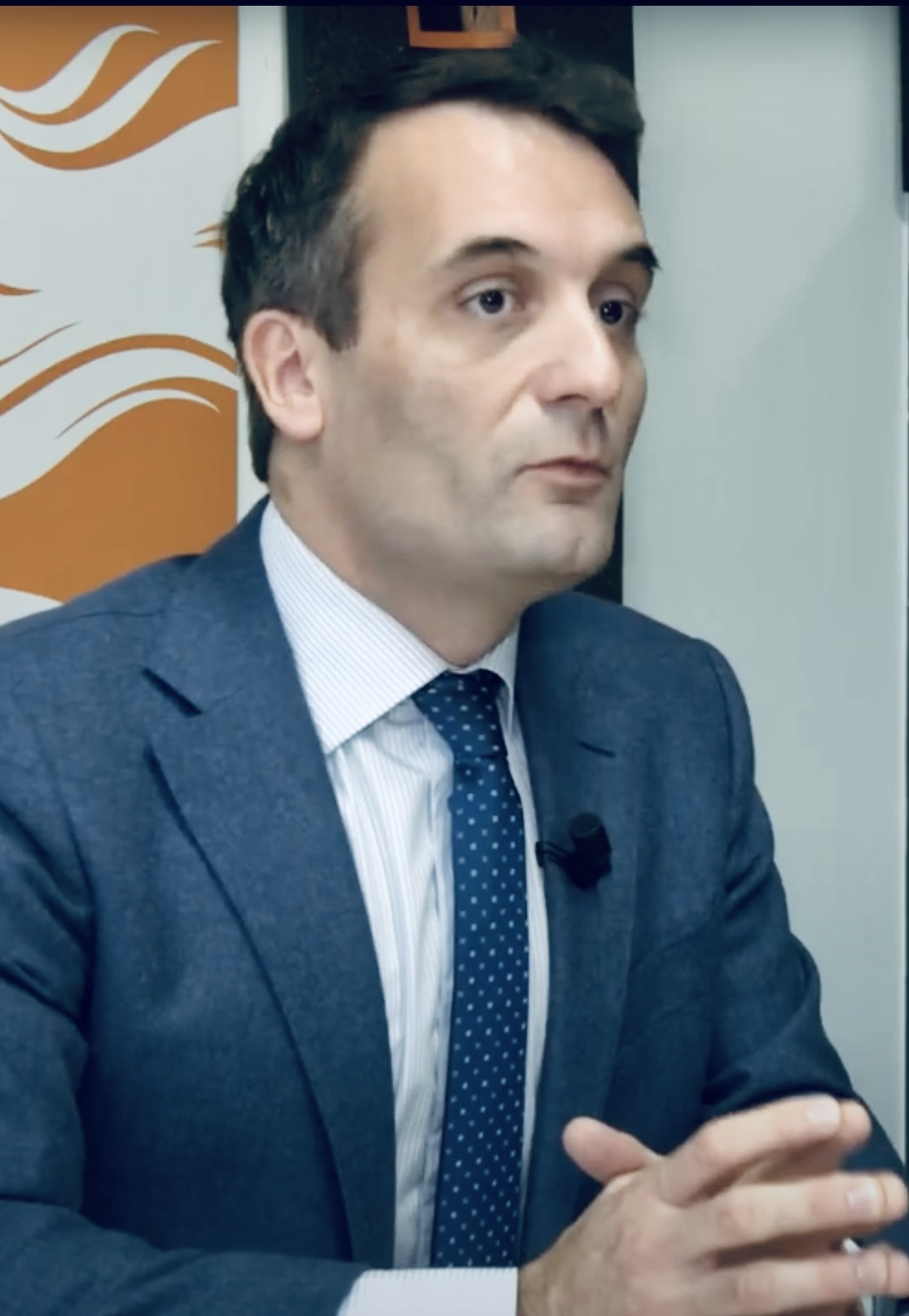
- Philippot in 2023

President of The Patriots
- Incumbent
- Assumed office 29 September 2017

Member of the European Parliament
- In office 1 July 2014 – 1 July 2019
- Constituency: East France

Vice President of the Front National
- In office 12 July 2012 – 21 September 2017
- Leader: Marine Le Pen; Jean-François Jalkh (Interim); Steeve Briois (Interim)

Personal details
- Born: Florian Louie Philippot; 24 October 1981 (age 44) Croix, Nord, France
- Party: Les Patriotes
- Other political affiliations: Front National (until 2017)
- Education: HEC Paris; ÉNA

Florian Philippot (French pronunciation: [flɔʁjɑ̃ filipo]; born 24 October 1981) is a French politician. He served as Vice President of the National Front from 2012 to 2017 before quitting the party to found The Patriots in September 2017, which has failed to win any representation in subsequent elections.

== Family background ==
Born on 24 October 1981 at Croix, Nord, he grew up in Bondues, a residential suburb in the Urban Community of Lille Métropole. He is a graduate of HEC Paris and ENA.

His father was the head teacher of a state primary school and his mother a primary-school teacher. His brother, Damien Philippot, a graduate of Sciences Po and ESCP Europe (École supérieure de commerce de Paris), was a manager of political studies in the French polling organization (IFOP).

== Political career ==
In October 2011, he was appointed strategic director of Marine Le Pen's presidential campaign. In July 2012, he was appointed vice president in charge of strategy and communication of the FN.

In 2012, he was parliamentary candidate in Moselle's 6th constituency. Despite the presence of a dissident candidate of the FN (4.09% for Eric Vilain) in the first round, he came second with 26.34% and defeated the incumbent UMP MP Pierre Lang (25.02%). Mayor of Forbach since 2008, Laurent Kalinowski defeated Florian Philippot in the run-off (53.70% against 46.30%).

On 9 November 2012, he went to Colombey-les-Deux-Églises to pay homage to Charles de Gaulle, putting flowers on his grave "in a private capacity" and stating his Gaullist convictions. This act irritated some members of the FN, due to Jean-Marie Le Pen's animosity toward the former president. His convictions and ideas were described as incompatible with de Gaulle's legacy by the UMP party, although some commentators do not consider the UMP a Gaullist party any more.

After refusing to quit the think tank The Patriots (Les Patriotes) he founded in the wake of the FN's performance in the 2017 presidential and legislative elections, and differences in his stance over the euro with others in the party, he announced his departure from the FN on 21 September 2017. In the 2019 European Parliament election in France, his party obtained 0.6% of the votes, and Philippot lost his place in the European Parliament to fellow RN politician Jordan Bardella.

He attempted to run for the 2022 French presidential election, but failed after getting only 1 sponsorship out of the 500 valid sponsorships necessary to be on the ballot.

== Personal life ==
In December 2014, the French celebrity magazine Closer indicated that Philippot was gay, providing photographs of him and his boyfriend in Vienna. Philippot called the article an invasion of his privacy and said he would file a complaint against Closer. He further said the FN was neither "gay friendly" nor the opposite and that it was not difficult to be gay in the party.
