= Barby, Savoie =

Barby Barbi (Arpitan)
- Commune
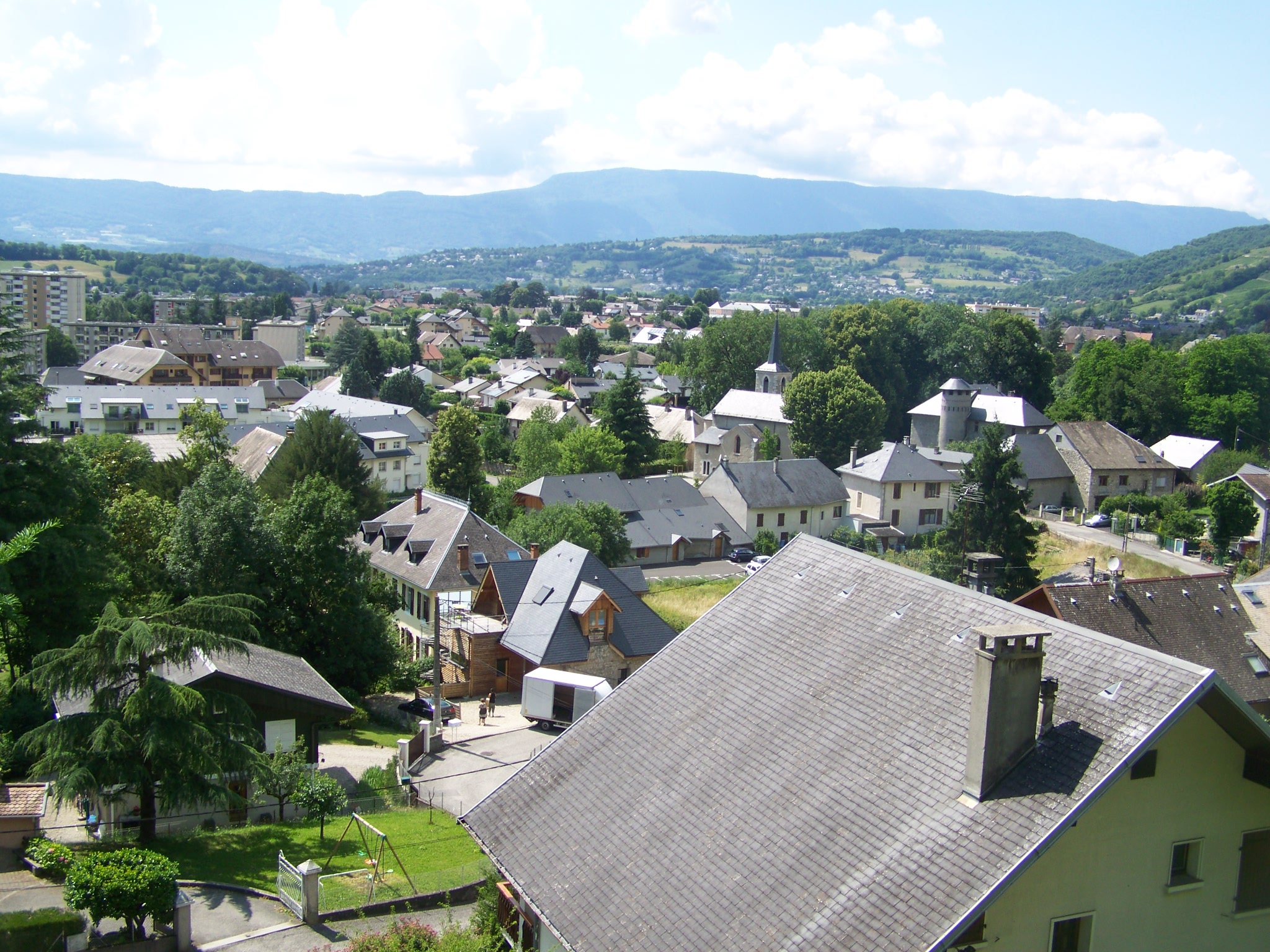
- Sight of the commune
- Location of Barby
- Location within France Location within Auvergne-Rhône-Alpes
- Coordinates: 45°34′20″N 5°58′42″E
- Country: France
- Region: Auvergne-Rhône-Alpes
- Department: Savoie
- Arrondissement: Chambéry
- Canton: Saint-Alban-Leysse
- Intercommunality: Grand Chambéry

Government
  - Mayor (2020–2026): Christophe Pierreton
- Area^{1}: 2.48 km^{2} (0.96 sq mi)
- Highest elevation: 655 m (2,149 ft)
- Lowest elevation: 292 m (958 ft)
- Population (2023): 3,772
  - Density: 1,520/km^{2} (3,940/sq mi)
- Demonym: Barbysins / Barbysines
- Time zone: UTC+01:00 (CET)
  - Summer (DST): UTC+02:00 (CEST)
- INSEE/Postal code: 73030 /73230
- Website: www.barby73.fr
- ^{1} French Land Register data, which excludes lakes, ponds, glaciers > 1 km^{2} (0.386 sq mi or 247 acres) and river estuaries.

Barby (French pronunciation: [baʁbi]; Arpitan: Barbi) is a commune in the Savoie department in the Auvergne-Rhône-Alpes region in Southeastern France. It is part of Grand Chambéry.

== Population ==
Historical population

Year	Pop.	±% p.a.
1793	200	—
1861	290	+0.55%
1911	242	−0.36%
1962	328	+0.60%
1968	550	+9.00%
1975	1,884	+19.23%
1982	2,672	+5.12%

Year	Pop.	±% p.a.
1990	3,080	+1.79%
1999	2,958	−0.45%
2007	3,284	+1.32%
2012	3,312	+0.17%
2017	3,414	+0.61%
2023	3,772	+1.68%

Source: EHESS and INSEE (1968-2023)

== See also ==
- Communes of the Savoie department
