= Françoise Grossetête =

French politician (born 1946)

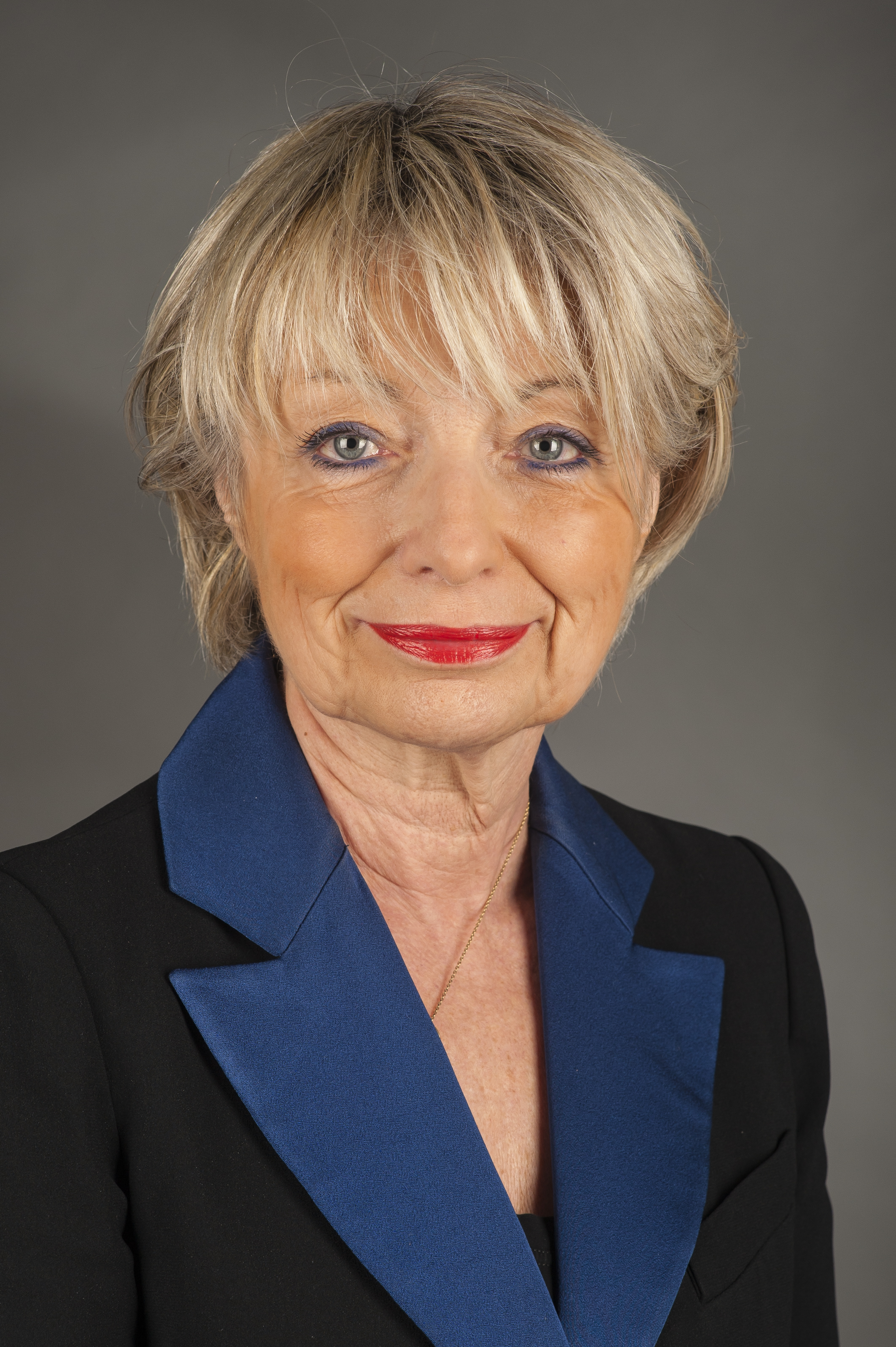

Member of the European Parliament
- In office 20 July 1994 – 2019
- Constituency: South-East France

Personal details
- Born: 17 May 1946 (age 79) Lyon, France
- Party: French: The Republicans; EU: European People's Party (EPP)

Françoise Grossetête (born 17 May 1946) is a French politician who served as Member of the European Parliament for the South-East of France from 1994 until 2019. She is a member of The Republicans; part of the European People's Party.

== Early life and career ==
- Degree in public law and political science (1969) – Higher Certificate in Social and Labour Law (1969).
- Lecturer in law in higher education (1969–1974).
- Parliamentary assistant (1988–1997).

== Political career ==
=== Career in French politics ===
- Federal secretary, Loire Republican Party (1984–1994)
- Member of the Démocratie Libérale policy bureau and national secretary for equal opportunities (until 1998)
- National Vice-chairwoman of the DL party, with responsibility for European and environmental issues (until 2002)
- National secretary of the UMP (since 2002) and vice-chairwoman of the Loire UMP Federation (2002)
- Member of Saint-Étienne Municipal Council (1983–2001)
- Member of Rhône-Alpes Regional Council (1986–1998)
- Member of the Saint-Étienne Métropole Urban Area Community Council (since 2001)
- Second Deputy Mayor of Saint-Étienne (since 2001)

=== Member of the European Parliament, 1994–2019 ===
Grossetête was first elected Member of the European Parliament in the 1994 European elections. Throughout her time in office, she served on the Committee on the Environment, Public Health and Food Safety. In this capacity, she was the Parliament's rapporteur on veterinary medicines. In 2010, she led the Parliament's negotiations the directive on patients' rights in cross-border healthcare.

In 2016, Grossetête also joined the Committee of Inquiry into Emission Measurements in the Automotive Sector. She previously served as member of the Temporary Committee on Climate Change (2007–2009), the Temporary Committee on Improving Safety at Sea (2003–2004) and the Temporary Committee on Foot and Mouth Disease (2002). She represented the Parliament at the 2015 United Nations Climate Change Conference in Paris.

In addition to her committee assignments, Grossetête was a member of the Parliament's delegation for relations EU-Russia Parliamentary Cooperation Committee since 2014. She previously served as a member of the delegations with the Gulf States, including Yemen, (2004–2014), with Australia and New Zealand (2007–2009), and with Cyprus (1994–2004), among others. From 2010 to 2011, she also served as co-coordinator of the European Parliament's High-Level Contact Group for Relations with the Turkish Cypriot Community in the Northern Part of the Island (CYTR).

Ahead of the 2014 European elections, Grossetête lost her spot at the top of the UMP party list for the southwest constituency to Renaud Muselier and instead became number two on the list. After the elections, she was voted vice chairwoman of the European People's Party Group (EPP) under the leadership of chairman Manfred Weber.

In 2014, Grossetête proposed to establish a European Parliament Intergroup on Health for Citizens, including stakeholders such as the European Cancer Patients Association and the Organisation for European Cancer Institutes. She is a member of the MEP Heart Group (sponsored by the European Heart Network (EHN) and the European Society of Cardiology (ESC)), a group of parliamentarians who have an interest in promoting measures that will help reduce the burden of cardiovascular diseases (CVD).

In 2015, Grossetête and Jacek Saryusz-Wolski guided the EPP's working groups on economy and environment and foreign affairs in developing options for getting the EU to speak with a unified voice on external energy security matters.

== Other activities ==
Françoise Grossetête serves as the First Vice-chairwoman of the French Federation of Regional Parks. Since 1989, she has chaired the Administration of the Pilat Regional Natural Park. Additionally, she has been the Chairwoman of the Loire departmental air quality network since 1991.

== Political positions ==
Following the 2016 referendum on the United Kingdom's European Union membership, Grossetête proposed that her hometown Lyon should be the new location for the London-based European Medicines Agency.
