= Marie-Christine Vergiat =

French politician (born 1956)

Marie-Christine Vergiat MEP
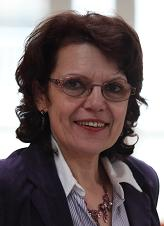

Member of the European Parliament for South-East France
- In office 1 July 2014 – 1 July 2019
- In office 14 July 2009 – 30 June 2014

Personal details
- Born: 23 September 1956 (age 69) Roanne
- Party: Left Front
- Spouse: Jean-Pierre Dubois
- Children: 1
- Website: www.eurocitoyenne.fr

Marie-Christine Vergiat (born 1956) is a community organizations' activist and a French politician. As of June 2009, she is a Member of the European Parliament, representing the Left Front. She is the companion of Jean-Pierre Dubois, president of the French Human Rights League, with whom she has a son. She is the leader of the organization in the Seine-Saint-Denis department outside of Paris.

== Biography ==
Born in Roanne, Loire, Marie-Christine Vergiat is the daughter of a butcher and a secretary. In 1965, her family moved to Chalon-sur-Saône, where she spent the rest of her childhood and adolescence. She then moved to Dijon to pursue her studies. She has a bachelor's degree in Public Law and a master's degree in History of Law.

As a student, Marie-Christine Vergiat becomes a militant activist within the UNEF, especially during the strikes of 1976 against the reforms in France's higher education system, and again in 1980 against the reforms of Alice Saunier-Seité. She became a member of the French Socialist Party in autumn 1980, and actively participated in the 1981 campaign of François Mitterrand. She left the PS in 2005.

After being in charge of the Mayor's office in Chevigny-Saint-Sauveur, a suburb of Dijon, Vergiat joined, in 1983, the Socialist group in the French National Assembly where she worked until 1997. From September 1997 to December 1999, she worked as a technical counselor in Martine Aubry's office. Since 1999, she has worked as an agent in the French Ministry of Social Affairs.

She has been an activist in the Human Rights League since 1983, a member of its central committee until March 2005, and the president of its Seine-Saint-Denis federation from January 2000 to January 2008. She is also a member of the French Education League since 2005, as well as vice-president of FOC 93, and has been actively involved in various associations dealing with human rights and popular education (FCPE).

In the 2009 European election, she was the top candidate for the Left Front list in the South-East constituency, and became a Member of the European Parliament. During her mandate, she will seat within the group of the European United Left–Nordic Green Left. She has been elected as the treasurer of the group and the head of the French delegation.

Vergiat is a member of the Advisory Panel of DiEM25.
