= Sylvie Guillaume =

French politician (born 1962)

Sylvie Guillaume MEP
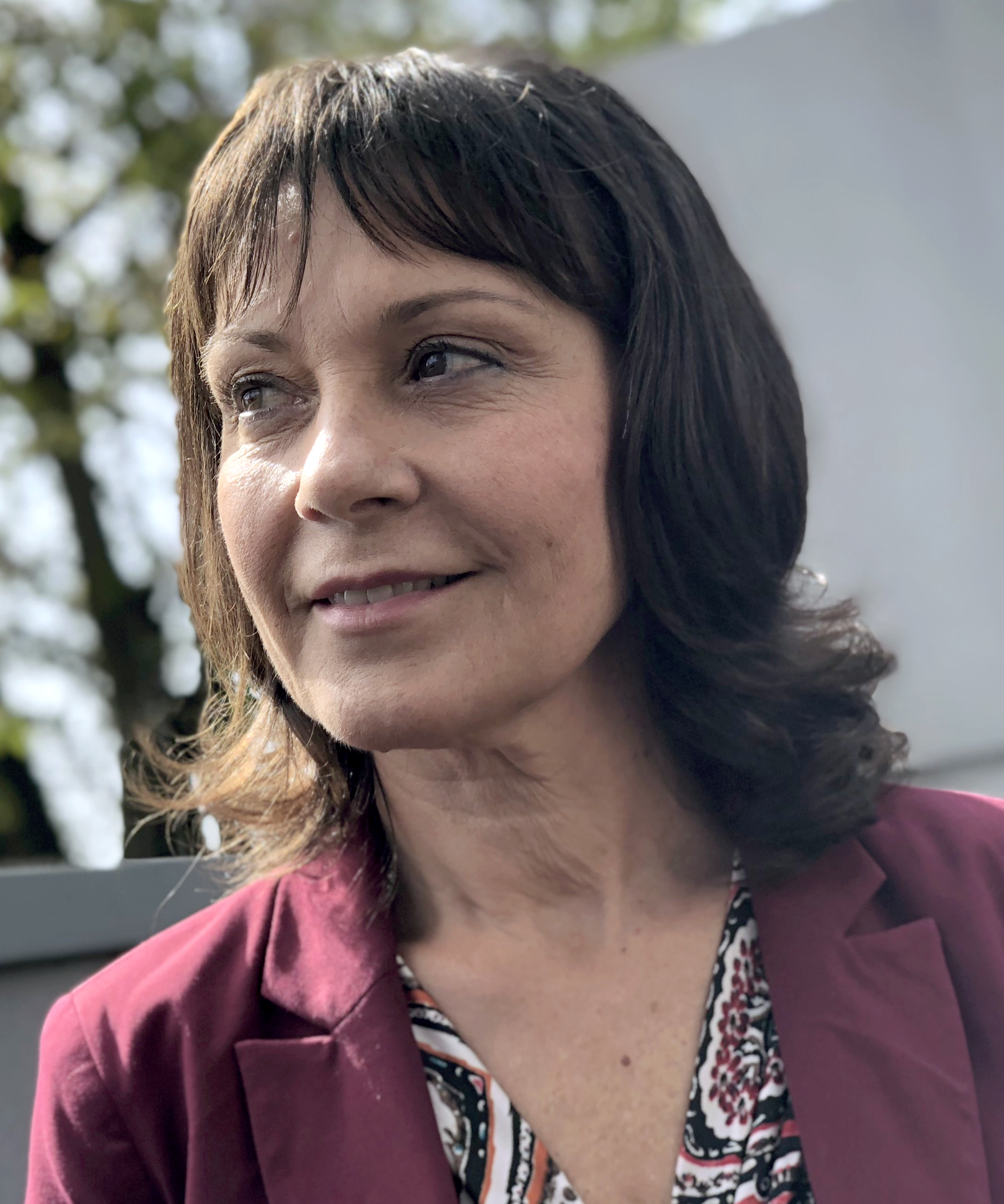

Member of the European Parliament
- In office 1 July 2009 – 15 July 2024
- Election: 7 June 2009; 25 mai 2014; 26 May 2019
- Parliament: 7th, 8th and 9th
- Parliamentary group: S&D
- Constituency: South-East France (2009–2019); France (2019–2024)

Vice-president of the European Parliament
- In office 1st July 2014 – 1st July 2019
- President: Martin Schulz; Antonio Tajani
- Election: 1st July 2014; 17 January 2017
- Parliament: 8th

Deputy mayor of Lyon in charge of Health and Social Affairs
- In office 25 March 2001 – 5 April 2014
- Mayor: Gérard Collomb

Member of the Municipal Council of Lyon
- In office 25 March 2001 – 5 April 2014
- Election: 18 March 2001; 18 March 2008
- Mayor: Gérard Collomb
- Constituency: 9th arrondissement

Member of Regional Council of Rhône-Alpes
- In office 16 March 1998 – 13 August 2009
- President: Charles Millon; Anne-Marie Comparini; Jean-Jack Queyranne
- Election: 15 March 1998; 28 March 1998

Personal details
- Born: 11 June 1962 (age 63) Antony, France
- Party: French; Socialist Party; EU; Party of European Socialists
- Profession: Civil servant, parliamentary aide
- Website: www.sylvieguillaume.eu

Sylvie Guillaume (born 11 June 1962) is a French politician who has served as a Member of the European Parliament (MEP) from 2009 to 2024. She is a member of the Socialist Party, part of the Party of European Socialists.

== Local political career ==
After a career in the social economy, Guillaume joined the Socialist Party (PS) in 1988 in its Rhône federation. She has held various responsibilities within the party, including that of president of the Socialists' national council between 2000 and 2003.

In 1998, she was elected a regional councillor in the Rhône-Alpes Regional Council. She was reelected in 2004 and held her seat until her resignation in 2009 following her election to the European Parliament. Following the 2001 municipal election, in which she was elected a municipal councillor of Lyon for its 9th arrondissement, she became a deputy mayor under Mayor Gérard Collomb. She was reelected in 2008.

== Member of the European Parliament, 2009-2024 ==
In the 2009 European elections, Guillaume was the second candidate on the PS list in the South-East region, and was elected to the European Parliament. She was reelected at the same position in 2014.

Guillaume has been serving on the Committee on Civil Liberties, Justice and Home Affairs (LIBE) since 2009, where she is in charge of human rights. On LIBE, she was appointed in 2009 rapporteur for the directive on common procedures for granting and withdrawing international protection. She is also a substitute member of the Committee on Women's Rights and Gender Equality (FEMM) and the Committee on Constitutional Affairs (AFCO). After being a women's rights activist, she was appointed National Secretary of the Socialist Party for Gender Equality.

In addition to her committee assignments, Guillaume is a member of the Spinelli Group, the European Parliament Intergroup on Artificial Intelligence and Digital, the European Parliament Intergroup on LGBT Rights, the European Parliament Intergroup on Disability, the European Parliament Intergroup on Integrity (Transparency, Anti-Corruption and Organized Crime) and the MEP Alliance for Mental Health.

Between January 2012 and 2014, Guillaume served as Vice President of the Progressive Alliance of Socialists and Democrats parliamentary group in charge of Citizens' Europe, along with Véronique De Keyser, Enrique Guerrero Salom, Stephen Hughes, Rovana Plumb, Bernhard Rapkay, Libor Rouček, Patrizia Toia and Marita Ulvskog.

In 2012 Guillaume was responsible for immigration issues in the presidential campaign of François Hollande.

From 2014 until 2019, Guillaume served as one of the Vice Presidents of the European Parliament, under the leadership of President Antonio Tajani. In this capacity, she was in charge of the parliament's transparency register and served as Vice Chairwoman of the Working Group on Information and Communication Policy.

In 2020, Guillaume joined Mounir Satouri, Frédérique Dumas and Hubert Julien-Laferrière in visiting several refugee camps in northern Syria that hold individuals displaced from the Islamic State of Iraq and the Levant, including al-Hawl and Roj.

Ahead of the 2022 presidential elections, Guillaume publicly declared her support for Anne Hidalgo as the Socialists’ candidate and joined her campaign team as diplomatic adviser. In 2023, she publicly endorsed the re-election of the Socialist Party's chairman Olivier Faure.
