= Rassemblement bleu Marine =

Rassemblement bleu Marine Rassemblement bleu Marine
- Abbreviation: RBM
- Leader: Marine Le Pen
- Founded: 8 May 2012
- Dissolved: 2017
- Ideology: French nationalism Right-wing populism
- Political position: Right-wing to far-right
- European Parliament group: Europe of Nations and Freedom
- Member parties: National Rally (RN); Patrie et citoyenneté (PeC); Other minor right-wing parties (EXD)

Rassemblement bleu Marine (RBM; English: the Marine Blue Rally) was a French political coalition of right-wing and far-right political parties created by Marine Le Pen in 2012 before the legislative elections. It originally consisted of the National Front, the Sovereignty, Identity and Freedoms (SIEL) party of Paul-Marie Coûteaux, the party Republican Entente (ER) led by Jacques Peyrat, the Republican Gathering (RR) of Jean-Yves Narquin, Patrie et citoyenneté (the Fatherland and Citizenship party; PeC), and a few other small right-wing political parties and independent politicians. It also has the support of the minor Party of Innocence led by Renaud Camus, although they are not officially part of the coalition. SIEL left the coalition in 2016. Later that year Louis Aliot announced the dissolution of the coalition. In 2018, with the change of name from the National Front to the National Rally there appeared to be a fusion of the Front National and Rassemblement Bleu Marine.

== See also ==
- Miscellaneous right
