= Édouard Ferrand =

French politician (1965–2018)

Édouard Ferrand (25 April 1965 – 1 February 2018) was a French politician and a member of National Front.

He was a Front National MEP and regional councillor in Burgundy. In 2009, he was selected to be National Front's candidate in Burgundy for the 2010 regional elections. He was elected to the European Parliament in May 2014.
