= Michel Dantin =

French politician (born 1960)

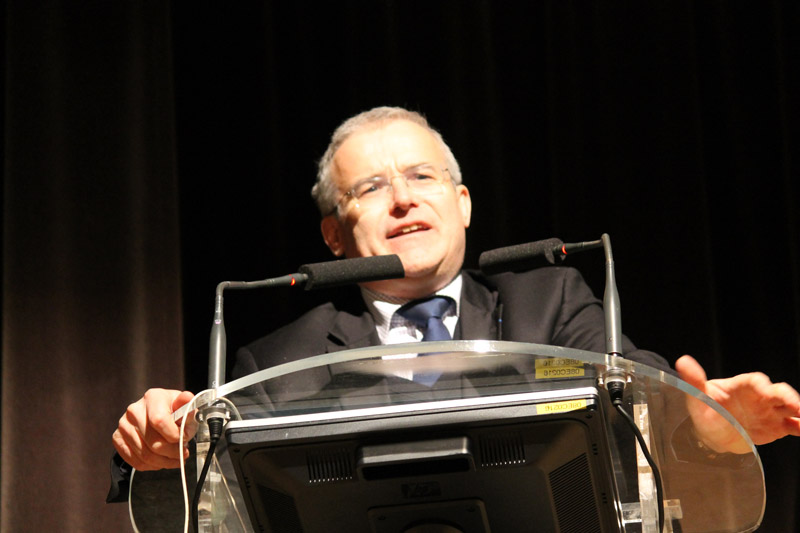

Member of the European Parliament
- In office 14 July 2009 – 1 July 2019
- Constituency: South-East France

Mayor of Chambéry
- In office 4 April 2014 – 4 July 2020
- Preceded by: Bernadette Laclais
- Succeeded by: Thierry Repentin

Personal details
- Born: 15 January 1960 (age 66) Lyon, France
- Party: Rally for the Republic (until 2002); Union for a Popular Movement (2002–2015); The Republicans (2015–present)

Michel Dantin (French pronunciation: [miʃɛl dɑ̃tɛ̃]; born 15 January 1960) is a French politician who served as a Member of the European Parliament (MEP) for the South-East France constituency from 2009 until 2019. In addition, he was Mayor of Chambéry from 2014 to 2020. A member of The Republicans (LR), he ran in the 2020 Senate election in Savoie, but withdrew his name following the first round of voting.

== Political career ==
=== Career in local politics ===
In 1983 at age 23, Dantin became a municipal councillor in Chambéry under Rally for the Republic Mayor Pierre Dumas. In 1985, he was elected to the General Council of Savoie in the canton of Chambéry-Nord for the Rally for the Republic, becoming its youngest councillor. He held one of its vice presidencies under the presidency of Michel Barnier (1994–1998). When seeking a third cantonal term in 1998, he was defeated by Socialist candidate Thierry Repentin. However, he was re-elected a municipal councillor on the RPR and UMP lists in 1989, 1995, 2001 and 2008.

Dantin served in the ministerial cabinets of Hervé Gaymard and Dominique Bussereau between 2002 and 2007, as well as from 2007 in the cabinet of Michel Barnier.

=== Member of the European Parliament, 2009–2019 ===
In the 2009 European election, Dantin was the sixth candidate on the Union for a Popular Movement list in the South-East constituency, but he was not elected. However, the fifth UMP MEP, Nora Berra, eventually did not take her seat due to her appointment to the government, which is why Dantin succeeded her. In the 2014 European election, he was re-elected.

At the time of his first election, Dantin was considered a protégé of Michel Barnier, the former agriculture minister, who served as European Commissioner for Internal Market and Services between 2010 and 2014. Throughout his time in parliament, he served on the Committee on Agriculture and Rural Development. From 2010 to 2011, he was also a member of the Special Committee on the policy challenges and budgetary resources for a sustainable European Union after 2013. In addition to his committee assignments, he was a member of the parliament's delegation with Switzerland and Norway and to the EU-Iceland Joint Parliamentary Committee and the European Economic Area (EEA) Joint Parliamentary Committee from 2014 until 2019.

Within the European People's Party, Dantin served as co-chair of the Ad Hoc Group on Agriculture from 2016 until 2017, alongside Germany’s Minister of Food and Agriculture Christian Schmidt.

In The Republicans' 2017 leadership election, Dantin endorsed Laurent Wauquiez.

=== Candidate for the Senate ===
In the 2020 election, Dantin ran for the Senate seat in Savoie held by Jean-Pierre Vial, who did not seek re-election. He withdrew his name following the first round of voting, after he placed ex aequo with Cédric Vial, who was eventually elected.
