= Marie-Christine Arnautu =

French politician (born 1952)

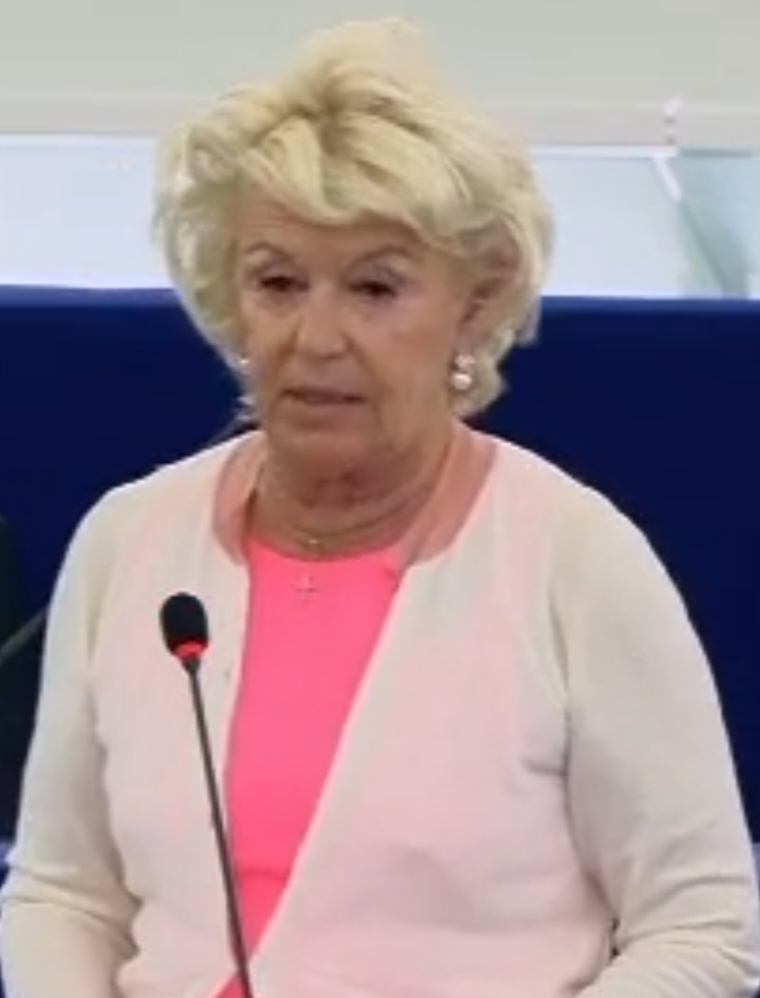
Arnautu in 2018

Marie-Christine Arnautu (born 19 October 1952 in Paris) is a French Member of the European Parliament (MEP) for the National Front, and the party's vice president for social affairs.

Previously, she served as an FN regional councillor in the Île-de-France region. In 2009, she was selected to be National Front's candidate in the Île-de-France region for the 2010 regional elections. In the 2014, she was elected to the European Parliament from the Île-de-France constituency.
