= Thierry Cornillet =

French politician (born 1951)

Thierry Cornillet (born 23 July 1951 in Montélimar, Drôme) is a French politician and Member of the European Parliament for the south-east of France. He is a member of the Union for French Democracy, which is part of the Alliance of Liberals and Democrats for Europe, and sits on the European Parliament's Committee on Development. He was president of the center-right Parti radical valoisien from 1997 to 1999.

He is a substitute for the Committee on Industry, Research and Energy, a substitute for the Subcommittee on Human Rights, vice-chair of the delegation to the ACP-EU Joint Parliamentary Assembly, and a member of the delegation to the Euro-Mediterranean Parliamentary Assembly.

== Career ==
- Master's degree in law (1975)
- Graduate of the Paris Institute of Political Studies (1975)
- Postgraduate diploma in environment law (1976)
- Doctorate in political science (1984)
- Chairman of the Radical Party (1999–2000)
- Vice-President of the UDF (2000–2002)
- National Secretary of the UDF (since 2002)
- Vice-Chairman of the Rhône-Alpes Regional Council (1999–2004)
- Member of Rhône-Alpes Regional Council (since 2004)
- Member of the National Assembly (1993–1997)
- Member of the European Parliament (since 1999)
- Vice-President of the ACP-EU Joint Assembly (since 2001)
- President of the International Association of French-Speaking Regions (2002–2010)
- Knight of the Order of Agricultural Merit
- Knight of the National Order of Merit
