= The Patriots (France) =

French political party

The Patriots Les Patriotes
- President: Florian Philippot
- Founded: 29 September 2017; 8 years ago
- Split from: National Front
- Headquarters: 122, Rue des Rosiers, 93400 Saint-Ouen-sur-Seine
- Membership (2022): ▲36,000
- Ideology: French nationalism Hard Euroscepticism; Traditional Gaullism; Right-wing populism Conspiracism; Anti-vaccination
- Political position: Right-wing to far-right
- European Parliament group: Europe of Freedom and Direct Democracy (2017–2019)
- Colours: Orange
- National Assembly: 0 / 577
- Senate: 0 / 348
- European Parliament: 0 / 74
- Presidency of Regional Councils: 0 / 17
- Presidency of Departmental Councils: 0 / 101

Website
- les-patriotes.fr

The Patriots (French: Les Patriotes; LP) is a nationalist and hard Eurosceptic political party in France. Founded by former vice president of the Front National (FN) Florian Philippot, it was registered on 29 September 2017. The party strongly supports a French withdrawal from both the European Union (EU) and Eurozone.

== Gallery ==
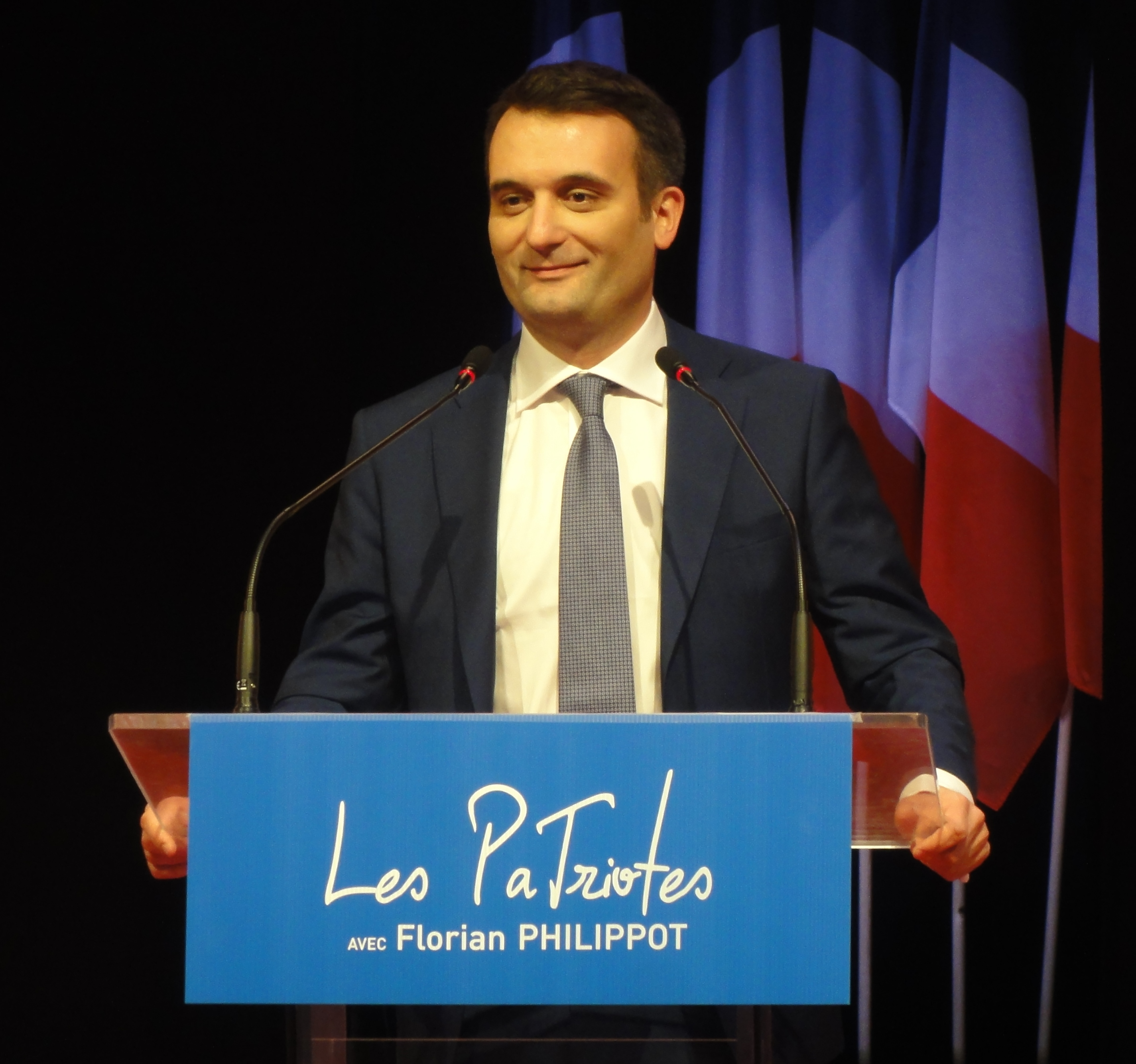
Philippot at the party's founding congress in Saint-Laurent-Blangy in 2018

== Election results ==
=== European Parliament ===
Election	Leader	Votes	%	Seats	+/−	EP Group
2019	Florian Philippot	147,140	0.65 (#15)	0 / 79	New	−
2024 (Note: Run in a joint list with VIA that won no seats.)	Florian Philippot	228,351	0.93 (#13)	0 / 81	0	−

== See also ==
- List of political parties in France
- Politics of France
