= Results of the 2024 French legislative election in Tarn =

Following the first round of the 2024 French legislative election on 30 June 2024, runoff elections in each constituency where no candidate received a vote share greater than 50 percent were scheduled for 7 July. Candidates permitted to stand in the runoff elections needed to either come in first or second place in the first round or achieve more than 12.5 percent of the votes of the entire electorate (as opposed to 12.5 percent of the vote share due to low turnout).

== Tarn ==
=== 1st constituency ===
Candidate	Party or alliance		First round		Second round	
Candidate	Party or alliance		Votes	%	Votes	%
Frédéric Cabrolier	National Rally		23,237	39.53	25,322	43.77
Philippe Bonnecarrère	Ensemble	Miscellaneous centre	17,352	29.52	32,529	56.23
Margot Lapeyre	New Popular Front	Socialist Party	16,673	28.37		
Denis Rouquette	Reconquête		769	1.31		
Eric Chavegrand	Far-left	Lutte Ouvrière	567	0.96		
Orphée Pauthier	Miscellaneous left	Independent	178	0.30		
Total			58,776	100.00	57,851	100.00
Valid votes			58,776	96.71	57,851	94.83
Invalid votes			683	1.12	1,088	1.78
Blank votes			1,314	2.16	2,069	3.39
Total votes			60,773	100.00	61,008	100.00
Registered voters/turnout			85,344	71.21	85,364	71.47

=== 2nd constituency ===
Candidate	Party or alliance		First round		Second round	
Candidate	Party or alliance		Votes	%	Votes	%
Julien Bacou	National Rally		28,850	37.94	34,425	49.27
Karen Erodi	New Popular Front	La France Insoumise	24,048	31.63	35,447	50.73
Pierre Verdier	Ensemble	Renaissance	16,501	21.70		
Thierno Bah	The Republicans		4,082	5.37		
Joel Encontre	Regionalists	Occitan Party	1,058	1.39		
Frédéric Lamouche	Reconquête		989	1.30		
Boris Gimenez-Sastre	Far-left	Lutte Ouvrière	512	0.67		
Total			76,040	100.00	69,872	100.00
Valid votes			76,040	96.14	69,872	88.25
Invalid votes			1,015	1.28	2,826	3.57
Blank votes			2,034	2.57	6,474	8.18
Total votes			79,089	100.00	79,172	100.00
Registered voters/turnout			110,310	71.70	110,310	71.77

=== 3rd constituency ===
Candidate	Party or alliance		First round		Second round	
Candidate	Party or alliance		Votes	%	Votes	%
Guilhem Carayon	Union of the far right	The Republicans	31,748	43.51	34,722	49.01
Jean Terlier	Ensemble	Renaissance	20,870	28.60	36,127	50.99
Julien Lassalle	New Popular Front	La France Insoumise	18,525	25.39		
Claire Daugé	Regionalists	Independent	965	1.32		
Chantal Tressens	Far-left	Lutte Ouvrière	767	1.05		
Alban Azais	Sovereigntist right	Independent	95	0.13		
Total			72,970	100.00	70,849	100.00
Valid votes			72,970	96.36	70,849	93.63
Invalid votes			959	1.27	1,555	2.06
Blank votes			1,794	2.37	3,265	4.31
Total votes			75,723	100.00	75,669	100.00
Registered voters/turnout			104,780	72.27	104,787	72.21
