= Tarn's 3rd constituency =

Constituency of the National Assembly of France

3rd constituency of Tarn
- inline Constituency of the National Assembly of France

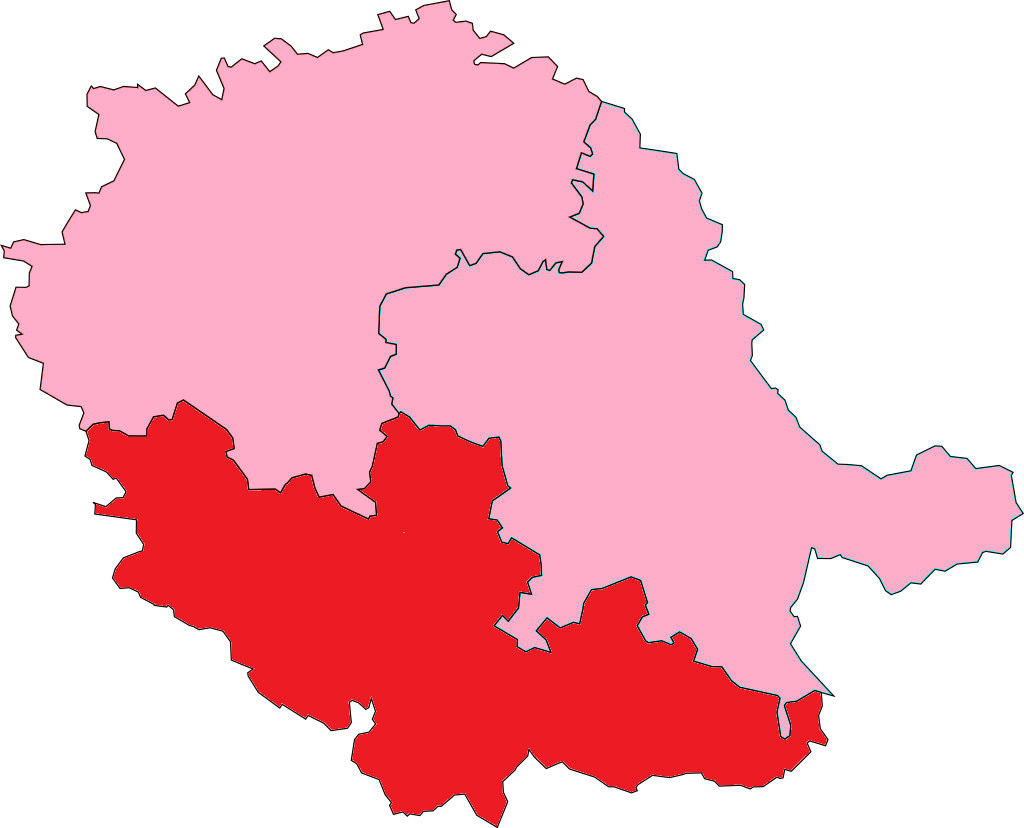
- Tarn's 3rd Constituency shown within the Tarn
- Deputy: Jean Terlier; RE
- Department: Tarn
- Cantons: Castres Nord, Castres Ouest, Cuq-Toulza, Dourgne, Labruguière, Lautrec, Lavaur, Mazamet Nord-Est, Mazamet Sud-Ouest, Puylaurens, Saint-Amans-Soult, Saint-Paul-Cap-de-Joux, Vielmur-sur-Agout
- Registered voters: 101,429

The 3rd constituency of the Tarn (French: Troisième circonscription du Tarn) is a French legislative constituency in the Tarn département. Like the other 576 French constituencies, it elects one MP using the two-round system, with a run-off if no candidate receives over 50% of the vote in the first round.

== Description ==
The 3rd constituency of Tarn lies in the south of the department and is based around Castres and the smaller town of Mazamet.

The voters of this constituency have generally supported centre right candidates with the exceptions of 2012 and 2017.

== Assembly Members ==
Election	Member	Party
1988	Jacques Limouzy	RPR
1993	Jacques Limouzy	RPR
1997	Jacques Limouzy	RPR
2002	Philippe Folliot	UDF
2007	Philippe Folliot	DVD
2012	Linda Gourjade	PS
2017	Jean Terlier	LREM
2022	Jean Terlier	RE

== Election results ==
=== 2024 ===
Candidate	Party	Alliance	First round		Second round	
Candidate	Party	Alliance	Votes	%	Votes	%
Jean Terlier	REN	Ensemble	20,870	28.60	36,127	50.99
Guilhem Carayon	LR	UXD	31,748	43.51	34,722	49.01
Julien Lassalle	LFI	NFP	18,525	25.39		
Claire Daugé	Ind	Reg	965	1.32		
Chantal Tressens	LO		767	1.05		
Alban Azais	Ind	DSV	95	0.13		
Valid votes			72,970	96.36	70,849	93.63
Blank votes			1,794	2.37	3,265	4.31
Null votes			959	1.27	1,555	2.06
Turnout			75,723	72.27	75,669	72.21
Abstentions			29,057	27.73	29,118	27.79
Registered voters			104,780		104,787	
Result			REN HOLD			

=== 2022 ===
Legislative Election 2022: Tarn's 3rd constituency
Party	Candidate	Votes	%	±%
LFI (NUPÉS)	Julien Lassalle	12,308	22.27	-10.26
LREM (Ensemble)	Jean Terlier	12,281	22.22	-1.28
RN	Virginie Callejon	12,267	22.20	+7.06
LR (UDC)	Guilhem Carayon	8,996	16.28	−7.25
PRG	Christelle Cabanis	4,436	8.03	N/A
REC	Laura Ponce	2,252	4.07	N/A
REG	Claire Dauge	1,205	2.18	N/A
Others	N/A	1,519	2.75	
Turnout		55,264	54.39	−0.04
2nd round result
LREM (Ensemble)	Jean Terlier	25,496	53.71	+1.60
LFI (NUPÉS)	Julien Lassalle	21,978	46.29	N/A
Turnout		47,474	51.81	+8.51
LREM hold				

=== 2017 ===
Legislative Election 2017: Tarn's 3rd constituency
Party	Candidate	Votes	%	±%
LREM	Jean Terlier	17,931	32.48	
LR	Bernard Carayon	12,988	23.53	
FN	Virginie Callejon	8,356	15.14	
LFI	Maud Forgeot	6,419	11.63	
PS	Linda Gourjade	5,006	9.07	
EELV	Stéphane Deleforge	1,571	2.85	
Others	N/A	2,937		
Turnout		55,208	54.43	
2nd round result
LREM	Jean Terlier	22,884	52.11	
LR	Bernard Carayon	21,031	47.89	
Turnout		43,915	43.30	
LREM gain from PS				

=== 2012 ===
Legislative Election 2012: Tarn's 3rd constituency
Party	Candidate	Votes	%	±%
UMP	Bernard Carayon	21,274	33.47	
PS	Linda Gourjade	15,353	24.15	
DVG	Didier Houles	8,816	13.87	
FN	Jean-Paul Piloz	8,530	13.42	
FG	Philippe Guerineau	3,792	5.97	
AC	Anne Laperrouze	3,197	5.03	
EELV	Francine Ricouart	1,347	2.12	
Others	N/A	1,257		
Turnout		63,566	64.56	
2nd round result
PS	Linda Gourjade	30,867	50.25	
UMP	Bernard Carayon	30,564	49.75	
Turnout		61,431	62.40	
PS gain from NM				

=== 2007 ===
Legislative Election 2007: Tarn's 3rd constituency
Party	Candidate	Votes	%	±%
NM	Philippe Folliot	13,381	34.25	
DVD	Jacques Thouroude	9,982	25.55	
PRG	Aude Raynaud	6,330	16.20	
DVG	Philippe Guerineau	4,237	10.85	
FN	Florence Charlopin	1,177	3.01	
Others	N/A	3,961		
Turnout		40,107	67.11	
2nd round result
NM	Philippe Folliot	19,927	64.78	
DVD	Jacques Thouroude	10,832	35.22	
Turnout		36,395	60.91	
NM gain from RPF				

=== 2002 ===
Legislative Election 2002: Tarn's 3rd constituency
Party	Candidate	Votes	%	±%
UMP	Pascal Bugis	11,256	27.62	
RPF	Philippe Folliot	9,245	22.68	
LV	Britgitte Desveaux	5,832	14.31	
PRG	Bernard Raynaud	4,291	10.53	
FN	Françoise Canac	4,109	10.08	
UDF	Nicole Jeanrot	1,074	2.64	
PCF	Marc Albouy	1,010	2.48	
DVD	Richard Amalvy	949	2.33	
Others	N/A	2,989		
Turnout		41,965	72.01	
2nd round result
RPF	Philippe Folliot	18,406	56.94	
UMP	Pascal Bugis	13,920	43.06	
Turnout		37,381	64.15	
RPF gain from RPR				

=== 1997 ===
Legislative Election 1997: Tarn's 3rd constituency
Party	Candidate	Votes	%	±%
PS	Jacques Esclassan	10,787	26.81	
RPR	Jacques Limouzy	9,256	23.00	
DVD	Philippe Folliot	7,283	18.10	
FN	Bernard Antony	5,759	14.31	
PCF	Louis Tignères	3,299	8.20	
LV	Gérard Bastide	1,518	3.77	
LO	Chantal Tressens	957	2.38	
Others	N/A	1,378		
Turnout		42,619	73.64	
2nd round result
RPR	Jacques Limouzy	21,057	51.37	
PS	Jacques Esclassan	19,930	48.63	
Turnout		44,887	77.58	
RPR hold				
