= André Vidal =

French engineer and politician

André Vidal (18 December 1908 – 27 September 1984) was a French engineer and politician.

Vidal was born in Constantine, French Algeria on 18 December 1908, to a middle-class family with origins in Castres, Mazamet, Carcassonne, and Gersoise. He attended École Polytechnique and became an engineer. In 1932, Vidal founded a consulting company, and served in the French military during World War II. Vidal was elected to the National Assembly in 1958 and served until the end of his term in 1962. He represented Tarn's 2nd constituency on behalf of the Union for the New Republic. In the next election cycle, Vidal ran as an independent candidate, and was unseated by Antonin Tirefort. Vidal also contested the 1968 legislative elections, which saw the defeat of Tirefort's successor, Jacques Limouzy. Thereafter, Vidal retired from electoral politics, and ran the Center for Applied Psychology, which he had established. Vidal died in Paris on 27 September 1984, aged 75.
