= Antonin Tirefort =

French politician

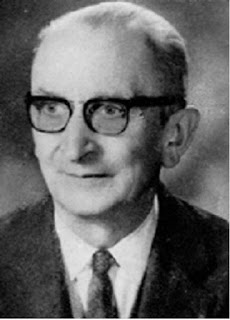

Antonin Jean André Tirefort (14 June 1899 – 18 April 1969) was a French politician.

Tirefort was born in Ferrières, Tarn, on 14 June 1899 to a carpenter father and a grocer mother. He attended a military academy and served during World War II, retiring with the rank of commander. Following the end of the conflict, Tirefort taught at the Lycée Saint-Joseph in Castres from 1948 to 1959. He was elected deputy mayor of Castres in 1953 and held the position until his death. In 1962, Tirefort was elected to the National Assembly from Tarn's 2nd constituency as a candidate of the Union for the New Republic, defeating the incumbent André Vidal, who opted to run for reelection as an independent candidate. Tirefort did not run for reelection in 1967, and the UNR chose to nominate Jacques Limouzy. Tirefort died in Castres on 18 April 1969, aged 69.
