= List of deputies of the 10th National Assembly of France =

This article gives the list in alphabetical order of French deputies of the 10th legislature (1993-1997).

This legislature opened on 2 April 1993, following the elections of 21 March and 28 March 1993, and ended with the dissolution of the Assembly on 21 April 1997 by decision of President of France Jacques Chirac.

For each Member of Parliament, the list specifies their department of election as well as the group to which they belong (for MPs only related to a political group, an “a ” precedes the name of the group). This list reflects the composition of the National Assembly on the date of 3 April 1993. Changes made to the composition of the Assembly are indicated in the notes section.

Parliamentary group		MPs			President declared
Parliamentary group		Members	Related	Total	President declared
RPR	Rally for the Republic	245	12	257	Bernard Pons (1993-1995), Michel Péricard (1995-1997)
UDF	Union for French Democracy	213	2	215	Charles Millon (1993-1995), Gilles de Robien (1995-1997)
PS	Socialiste	52	5	57	Martin Malvy (1993-1995), Laurent Fabius (1995-1997)
RI	République et liberté	23	0	23	Jean Royer
COM	Communiste	22	1	23	Alain Bocquet
Non-inscrit	Non inscrits	2	0	2	

== A ==
Name	Group	Department	Constituency
Jean-Pierre Abelin	UDF	Vienne	Vienne's 4th constituency
Jean-Claude Abrioux	RPR	Seine-Saint-Denis	Seine-Saint-Denis's 10th constituency
Bernard Accoyer	RPR	Haute-Savoie	Haute-Savoie's 1st constituency
Thérèse Aillaud	a. RPR	Bouches-du-Rhône	Bouches-du-Rhône's 16th constituency
Pierre Albertini	UDF	Seine-Maritime	Seine-Maritime's 2nd constituency
Michèle Alliot-Marie	RPR	Pyrénées-Atlantiques	Pyrénées-Atlantiques's 6th constituency
Edmond Alphandéry	UDF	Maine-et-Loire	Maine-et-Loire's 3rd constituency
Nicole Ameline	UDF	Calvados	Calvados's 4th constituency
Jean-Paul Anciaux	RPR	Saône-et-Loire	Saône-et-Loire's 3rd constituency
Jean-Marie André	UDF	Gard	Gard's 2nd constituency
René André	RPR	Manche	Manche's 2nd constituency
André Angot	RPR	Finistère	Finistère's 1st constituency
Gilbert Annette	a. PS	La Réunion	Réunion's 1st constituency
Daniel Arata	RPR	Aude	Aude's 3rd constituency
Henri-Jean Arnaud	RPR	Ardèche	Ardèche's 2nd constituency
François Asensi	PCF	Seine-Saint-Denis	Seine-Saint-Denis's 11th constituency
Jean-Claude Asphe	RPR	Eure	Eure's 5th constituency
Henri d'Attilio	PS	Bouches-du-Rhône	Bouches-du-Rhône's 12th constituency
Philippe Auberger	RPR	Yonne	Yonne's 3rd constituency
Emmanuel Aubert	RPR	Alpes-Maritimes	Alpes-Maritimes's 4th constituency
François d'Aubert	UDF	Mayenne	Mayenne's 1st constituency
Raymond-Max Aubert	RPR	Corrèze	Corrèze's 1st constituency
Rémy Auchedé	PCF	Pas-de-Calais	Pas-de-Calais's 11th constituency
Jean Auclair	a. RPR	Creuse	Creuse's 2nd constituency
Gautier Audinot	RPR	Somme	Somme's 5th constituency
Jean-Marc Ayrault	PS	Loire-Atlantique	Loire-Atlantique's 3rd constituency

== B ==
Name	Group	Department
Pierre Bachelet	RPR	Alpes-Maritimes
Roselyne Bachelot	RPR	Maine-et-Loire
Jean-Claude Bahu	RPR	Rhône
Patrick Balkany	RPR	Hauts-de-Seine
Édouard Balladur	RPR	Paris
Jean-Pierre Balligand	PS	Aisne
Claude Barate	RPR	Pyrénées-Orientales
Gilbert Barbier	UDF	Jura
Jean Bardet	RPR	Val-d'Oise
Didier Bariani	UDF	Paris
Michel Barnier	RPR	Savoie
François Baroin	RPR	Aube
Raymond Barre	a. UDF	Rhône
Jacques Barrot	UDF	Haute-Loire
Claude Bartolone	PS	Seine-Saint-Denis
André Bascou	RPR	Pyrénées-Orientales
Hubert Bassot	UDF	Orne
Jean-Pierre Bastiani	UDF	Haute-Garonne
Christian Bataille	PS	Nord
Jean-Claude Bateux	PS	Seine-Maritime
Dominique Baudis	UDF	Haute-Garonne
Jacques Baumel	RPR	Hauts-de-Seine
Gilbert Baumet	Non-inscrit	Gard
Charles Baur	UDF	Aisne
François Bayrou	UDF	Pyrénées-Atlantiques
Jean-Claude Beauchaud	PS	Charente
Jean-Louis Beaumont	UDF	Val-de-Marne
René Beaumont	UDF	Saône-et-Loire
Pierre Bédier	RPR	Yvelines
Jean Bégault	UDF	Maine-et-Loire
Didier Béguin	UDF	Nièvre
Pierre Bérégovoy	PS	Nièvre
Christian Bergelin	RPR	Haute-Saône
Jean-Louis Bernard	UDF	Loiret
Michel Berson	PS	Essonne
André Berthol	RPR	Moselle
Léon Bertrand	RPR	Guyane
Jean Besson	RPR	Rhône
Raoul Béteille	RPR	Seine-Saint-Denis
Gilbert Biessy	PCF	Isère
Jérôme Bignon	RPR	Somme
Jean-Claude Bireau	RPR	Gironde
Claude Birraux	UDF	Haute-Savoie
Jacques Blanc	UDF	Lozère
Michel Blondeau	UDF	Indre
Roland Blum	UDF	Bouches-du-Rhône
Gérard Boche	UDF	Puy-de-Dôme
Alain Bocquet	PCF	Nord
Jean-Claude Bois	PS	Pas-de-Calais
Jean de Boishue	RPR	Essonne
Marie-Thérèse Boisseau	a. UDF	Ille-et-Vilaine
Philippe Bonnecarrère	RPR	Tarn
Yves Bonnet	UDF	Manche
Yvon Bonnot	UDF	Côtes-d'Armor
Augustin Bonrepaux	PS	Ariège
Jeanine Bonvoisin	UDF	Seine-Maritime
Jean-Louis Borloo	Non-inscrit	Nord
Franck Borotra	RPR	Yvelines
Bernard Bosson	UDF	Haute-Savoie
Jean-Michel Boucheron	PS	Ille-et-Vilaine
Emmanuelle Bouquillon	UDF	Aisne
Alphonse Bourgasser	a. UDF	Moselle
Bruno Bourg-Broc	RPR	Marne
Jean Bousquet	UDF	Gard
Christine Boutin	UDF	Yvelines
Loïc Bouvard	UDF	Morbihan
Michel Bouvard	RPR	Savoie
Jacques Boyon	RPR	Ain
Jean-Pierre Braine	PS	Oise
Jean-Guy Branger	UDF	Charente-Maritime
Patrick Braouezec	PCF	Seine-Saint-Denis
Jean-Pierre Brard	PCF	Seine-Saint-Denis
Lucien Brenot	a. RPR	Côte-d'Or
Philippe Briand	RPR	Indre-et-Loire
Jean Briane	UDF	Aveyron
Jacques Briat	UDF	Tarn-et-Garonne
Louis de Froissard de Broissia	RPR	Côte-d'Or
Jacques Brossard	UDF	Deux-Sèvres
Jacques Brunhes	PCF	Hauts-de-Seine
Dominique Bussereau	RPR	Charente-Maritime

== C ==
Name	Group	Department
Christian Cabal	RPR	Loire
Jean-Pierre Calvel	UDF	Rhône
François Calvet	UDF	Pyrénées-Orientales
Bernard Carayon	RPR	Tarn
Pierre Cardo	UDF	Yvelines
Alain Carignon	RPR	Isère
Grégoire Carneiro	RPR	Haute-Garonne
René Carpentier	PCF	Nord
Antoine Carré	UDF	Loiret
Michel Cartaud	UDF	Puy-de-Dôme
Gérard Castagnéra	RPR	Gironde
Nicole Catala	RPR	Paris
Laurent Cathala	PS	Val-de-Marne
Jean-Charles Cavaillé	RPR	Morbihan
Jean-Pierre Cave	UDF	Tarn-et-Garonne
Robert Cazalet	UDF	Gironde
Arnaud Cazin d'Honincthun	UDF	Finistère
Jacques Chaban-Delmas	RPR	Gironde
René Chabot	RPR	Indre
Jean-Yves Chamard	RPR	Vienne
Édouard Chammougon	Non-inscrit	Guadeloupe
Hervé de Charette	UDF	Maine-et-Loire
Jean-Paul Charié	RPR	Loiret
Bernard Charles	Non-inscrit	Lot
Serge Charles	RPR	Nord
Jean Charroppin	RPR	Jura
Jean-Marc Chartoire	UDF	Puy-de-Dôme
Georges Chavanes	UDF	Charente
Ernest Chénière	RPR	Oise
Gérard Cherpion	a. RPR	Vosges
Jean-Pierre Chevènement	PS	Territoire de Belfort
Jacques Chirac	RPR	Corrèze
Paul Chollet	UDF	Lot-et-Garonne
Jean-François Chossy	UDF	Loire
Pascal Clément	UDF	Loire
Colette Codaccioni	RPR	Nord
Jean-Pierre Cognat	RPR	Seine-et-Marne
Daniel Colin	UDF	Var
Daniel Colliard	PCF	Seine-Maritime
Louis Colombani	UDF	Var
Georges Colombier	UDF	Isère
Thierry Cornillet	UDF	Drôme
Gérard Cornu	RPR	Eure-et-Loir
François Cornut-Gentille	RPR	Haute-Marne
René Couanau	UDF	Ille-et-Vilaine
Anne-Marie Couderc	RPR	Paris
Raymond Couderc	UDF	Hérault
Bernard Coulon	UDF	Allier
Charles de Courson	UDF	Marne
Alain Cousin	RPR	Manche
Bertrand Cousin	RPR	Finistère
Yves Coussain	UDF	Cantal
Jean-Michel Couve	RPR	Var
René Couveinhes	RPR	Hérault
Charles Cova	RPR	Seine-et-Marne
Jean-Yves Cozan	UDF	Finistère
Henri Cuq	RPR	Yvelines

== D ==
Name	Group	Department	Constituency
Christian Daniel	RPR	Côtes-d'Armor	
Alain Danilet	RPR	Gard	
Olivier Darrason	UDF	Bouches-du-Rhône	
Camille Darsières	a. PS	Martinique	
Olivier Dassault	RPR	Oise	
Marc-Philippe Daubresse	UDF	Nord	
Martine David	PS	Rhône	Rhône's 13th constituency
Bernard Davoine	PS	Nord	
Gabriel Deblock	a. RPR	Nord	
Bernard Debré	RPR	Indre-et-Loire	
Jean-Louis Debré	RPR	Eure	
Jean-Claude Decagny	UDF	Nord	
Jean-Pierre Defontaine	a. PS	Pas-de-Calais	
Lucien Degauchy	RPR	Oise	
Arthur Dehaine	RPR	Oise	
Jean-Pierre Delalande	RPR	Val-d'Oise	
Francis Delattre	UDF	Val-d'Oise	
Richard Dell'Agnola	RPR	Val-de-Marne	
Pierre Delmar	RPR	Alpes-de-Haute-Provence	
Jean-Jacques Delmas	UDF	Lozère	
Jean-Jacques Delvaux	RPR	Pas-de-Calais	
Jean-Marie Demange	RPR	Moselle	
Claude Demassieux	RPR	Pas-de-Calais	
Christian Demuynck	RPR	Seine-Saint-Denis	
Jean-François Deniau	UDF	Cher	
Xavier Deniau	RPR	Loiret	
Yves Deniaud	RPR	Orne	
Léonce Deprez	UDF	Pas-de-Calais	
Bernard Derosier	PS	Nord	
Jean Desanlis	UDF	Loir-et-Cher	
Jean-Jacques Descamps	UDF	Indre-et-Loire	
Michel Destot	PS	Isère	
Alain Devaquet	RPR	Paris	
Patrick Devedjian	RPR	Hauts-de-Seine	
Emmanuel Dewees	RPR	Nord	
Claude Dhinnin	RPR	Nord	
Serge Didier	UDF	Haute-Garonne	
Jean Diébold	RPR	Haute-Garonne	
Willy Diméglio	UDF	Hérault	
Éric Doligé	RPR	Loiret	
Laurent Dominati	UDF	Paris	
Maurice Dousset	UDF	Eure-et-Loir	
Philippe Douste-Blazy	UDF	Hautes-Pyrénées	
Julien Dray	PS	Essonne	
Guy Drut	RPR	Seine-et-Marne	
Jean-Michel Dubernard	a. RPR	Rhône	
Éric Duboc	RPR	Vienne	
Philippe Dubourg	RPR	Gironde	
Pierre Ducout	PS	Gironde	
Xavier Dugoin	RPR	Essonne	
Dominique Dupilet	PS	Pas-de-Calais	
Christian Dupuy	RPR	Hauts-de-Seine	
Georges Durand	UDF	Drôme	
Jean-Paul Durieux	PS	Meurthe-et-Moselle	
André Durr	RPR	Bas-Rhin	

== E ==
Name	Group	Department
Charles Ehrmann	UDF	Alpes-Maritimes
Henri Emmanuelli	PS	Landes
Christian Estrosi	RPR	Alpes-Maritimes
Jean-Claude Étienne	RPR	Marne

== F ==
Name	Group	Department
Claude Gaillard	UDF	Meurthe-et-Moselle
Robert Galley	RPR	Aube
René Galy-Dejean	RPR	Paris
Gilbert Gantier	UDF	Paris
Pierre Garmendia	PS	Gironde
Étienne Garnier	RPR	Loire-Atlantique
René Garrec	UDF	Calvados
Daniel Garrigue	RPR	Dordogne
Pierre Gascher	Non inscrit	Sarthe
Henri de Gastines	RPR	Mayenne
Kamilo Gata	a. PS	Wallis-et-Futuna
Claude Gatignol	UDF	Manche
Jean de Gaulle	RPR	Paris
Jean-Claude Gayssot	PCF	Seine-Saint-Denis
Jean Geney	RPR	Doubs
Germain Gengenwin	UDF	Bas-Rhin
Aloys Geoffroy	UDF	Meurthe-et-Moselle
André Gerin	PCF	Rhône
Alain Gest	UDF	Somme
Jean-Marie Geveaux	RPR	Sarthe
Charles Gheerbrant	UDF	Pas-de-Calais
Michel Ghysel	RPR	Nord
Claude Girard	RPR	Doubs
Michel Giraud	RPR	Val-de-Marne
Valéry Giscard d'Estaing	UDF	Puy-de-Dôme
Jean Glavany	PS	Hautes-Pyrénées
Jean-Louis Goasduff	RPR	Finistère
Michel Godard	UDF	Morbihan
Jacques Godfrain	RPR	Aveyron
François-Michel Gonnot	UDF	Oise
Georges Gorse	RPR	Hauts-de-Seine
Jean Gougy	RPR	Pyrénées-Atlantiques
Christian Gourmelen	UDF	Val-d'Oise
Marie-Fanny Gournay	RPR	Nord
Michel Grandpierre	PCF	Seine-Maritime
Jean Gravier	UDF	Allier
Maxime Gremetz	PCF	Somme
Gérard Grignon	UDF	Saint-Pierre-et-Miquelon
Hubert Grimault	UDF	Maine-et-Loire
Alain Griotteray	UDF	Val-de-Marne
François Grosdidier	RPR	Moselle
Louis Guédon	RPR	Vendée
Ambroise Guellec	UDF	Finistère
Olivier Guichard	RPR	Loire-Atlantique
Lucien Guichon	RPR	Ain
Évelyne Guilhem	RPR	Haute-Vienne
François Guillaume	RPR	Meurthe-et-Moselle
Jean-Jacques Guillet	RPR	Hauts-de-Seine
Jacques Guyard	PS	Essonne

== H ==
Name	Group	Department
Michel Habig	RPR	Haut-Rhin
Jean-Yves Haby	UDF	Hauts-de-Seine
Georges Hage	PCF	Nord
Gérard Hamel	RPR	Eure-et-Loir
Michel Hannoun	RPR	Isère
François d'Harcourt	UDF	Calvados
Joël Hart	RPR	Somme
Pierre Hellier	UDF	Sarthe
Pierre Hériaud	UDF	Loire-Atlantique
Guy Hermier	PCF	Bouches-du-Rhône
Patrick Hoguet	UDF	Eure-et-Loir
Françoise Hostalier	UDF	Nord
Philippe Houillon	UDF	Val-d'Oise
Pierre-Rémy Houssin	RPR	Charente
Elisabeth Hubert	RPR	Loire-Atlantique
Robert Huguenard	RPR	Haute-Garonne
Michel Hunault	RPR	Loire-Atlantique
Jean-Jacques Hyest	UDF	Seine-et-Marne

== I ==
Name	Group	Department
Jean-Louis Idiart	PS	Haute-Garonne
Amédée Imbert	UDF	Ardèche
Michel Inchauspé	RPR	Pyrénées-Atlantiques
Bernadette Isaac-Sibille	UDF	Rhône

== J ==
Name	Group	Department
Yvon Jacob	a. RPR	Ille-et-Vilaine
Muguette Jacquaint	PCF	Seine-Saint-Denis
Denis Jacquat	UDF	Moselle
Michel Jacquemin	UDF	Doubs
Frédéric Jalton	PS	Guadeloupe
Janine Jambu	PCF	Hauts-de-Seine
Serge Janquin	PS	Pas-de-Calais
Henry Jean-Baptiste	UDF	Mayotte
Gérard Jeffray	UDF	Seine-et-Marne
Jean-Jacques Jegou	UDF	Val-de-Marne
Antoine Joly	RPR	Sarthe
Charles Josselin	PS	Côtes-d'Armor
Didier Julia	RPR	Seine-et-Marne
Alain Juppé	RPR	Paris
Jean Juventin	RPR	Polynésie française

== K ==
Name	Group	Department
Gabriel Kaspereit	RPR	Paris
Aimé Kergueris	UDF	Morbihan
Christian Kert	UDF	Bouches-du-Rhône
Jean Kiffer	RPR	Moselle
Joseph Klifa	UDF	Haut-Rhin
Jean-Pierre Kucheida	PS	Pas-de-Calais

== L ==
Name	Group	Department
André Labarrère	PS	Pyrénées-Atlantiques
Patrick Labaune	RPR	Drôme
Marc Laffineur	UDF	Maine-et-Loire
Jacques Lafleur	RPR	Nouvelle-Calédonie
Henri Lalanne	UDF	Landes
Jean-Claude Lamant	RPR	Aisne
Alain Lamassoure	UDF	Pyrénées-Atlantiques
Raymond Lamontagne	RPR	Val-d'Oise
Édouard Landrain	UDF	Loire-Atlantique
Jack Lang	PS	Loir-et-Cher
Pierre Lang	UDF	Moselle
Philippe Langenieux-Villard	RPR	Isère
Harry Lapp	UDF	Bas-Rhin
Gérard Larrat	UDF	Aude
Louis Lauga	RPR	Landes
Thierry Lazaro	RPR	Nord
Bernard Leccia	RPR	Bouches-du-Rhône
Jean-Yves Le Déaut	PS	Meurthe-et-Moselle
Jean-Claude Lefort	PCF	Val-de-Marne
Marc Le Fur	RPR	Côtes-d'Armor
Philippe Legras	RPR	Haute-Saône
Pierre Lellouche	RPR	Val-d'Oise
Jean-Claude Lemoine	RPR	Manche
Jacques Le Nay	Non inscrit	Morbihan
Jean-Claude Lenoir	Non inscrit	Orne
Gérard Léonard	RPR	Meurthe-et-Moselle
Jean-Louis Leonard	RPR	Charente-Maritime
François Léotard	UDF	Var
Serge Lepeltier	RPR	Cher
Louis Le Pensec	PS	Finistère
Arnaud Lepercq	RPR	Vienne
Pierre Lequiller	UDF	Yvelines
Bernard Leroy	UDF	Eure
Roger Lestas	UDF	Mayenne
André Lesueur	RPR	Martinique
Édouard Leveau	RPR	Seine-Maritime
Alain Le Vern	PS	Seine-Maritime
Maurice Ligot	UDF	Maine-et-Loire
Jacques Limouzy	RPR	Tarn
Jean de Lipkowski	RPR	Charente-Maritime
Gérard Longuet	UDF	Meuse
François Loos	UDF	Bas-Rhin
Arsène Lux	a. RPR	Meuse

== M ==
Nom	Groupe	Circonscription
Alain Madalle	Non inscrit	Aude
Alain Madelin	UDF	Ille-et-Vilaine
Claude Malhuret	UDF	Allier
Martin Malvy	PS	Lot
Jean-François Mancel	RPR	Oise
Daniel Mandon	UDF	Loire
Raymond Marcellin	UDF	Morbihan
Georges Marchais	PCF	Val-de-Marne
Yves Marchand	UDF	Hérault
Claude-Gérard Marcus	RPR	Paris
Thierry Mariani	RPR	Vaucluse
Hervé Mariton	UDF	Drôme
Alain Marleix	RPR	Cantal
Alain Marsaud	RPR	Haute-Vienne
Jean Marsaudon	RPR	Essonne
Philippe Martin	Non inscrit	Marne
Henriette Martinez	RPR	Hautes-Alpes
Patrice Martin-Lalande	RPR	Loir-et-Cher
Jacques Masdeu-Arus	RPR	Yvelines
Marius Masse	PS	Bouches-du-Rhône
Jean Louis Masson	RPR	Moselle
Philippe Mathot	UDF	Ardennes
Didier Mathus	PS	Saône-et-Loire
Jean-François Mattei	UDF	Bouches-du-Rhône
Alain Mayoud	UDF	Rhône
Pierre Mazeaud	RPR	Haute-Savoie
Pierre Méhaignerie	UDF	Ille-et-Vilaine
Jacques Mellick	PS	Pas-de-Calais
Paul Mercieca	PCF	Val-de-Marne
Pierre Merli	UDF	Alpes-Maritimes
Denis Merville	RPR	Seine-Maritime
Georges Mesmin	UDF	Paris
Philippe Mestre	UDF	Vendée
Louis Mexandeau	PS	Calvados
Gilbert Meyer	RPR	Haut-Rhin
Michel Meylan	UDF	Haute-Savoie
Pierre Micaux	UDF	Aube
Lucette Michaux-Chevry	RPR	Guadeloupe
Jean-Pierre Michel	PS	Haute-Saône
Didier Migaud	PS	Isère
Jean-Claude Mignon	RPR	Seine-et-Marne
Charles Millon	UDF	Ain
Charles Miossec	RPR	Finistère
Odile Moirin	RPR	Essonne
Aymeri de Montesquiou	UDF	Gers
Louise Moreau	UDF	Alpes-Maritimes
Jean-Marie Morisset	UDF	Deux-Sèvres
Georges Mothron	RPR	Val-d'Oise
Ernest Moutoussamy	a. PCF	Guadeloupe
Alain Moyne-Bressand	UDF	Isère
Alfred Muller	Non inscrit	Bas-Rhin
Bernard Murat	RPR	Corrèze
Renaud Muselier	RPR	Bouches-du-Rhône
Jacques Myard	RPR	Yvelines

== N ==
Name	Group	Department
Véronique Neiertz	PS	Seine-Saint-Denis
Maurice Nénou-Pwataho	RPR	Nouvelle-Calédonie
Jean-Marc Nesme	UDF	Saône-et-Loire
Catherine Nicolas	RPR	Eure
Yves Nicolin	UDF	Loire
Michel Noir	Non inscrit	Rhône
Hervé Novelli	UDF	Indre-et-Loire
Roland Nungesser	RPR	Val-de-Marne

== O ==
Name	Group	Department
Patrick Ollier	RPR	Hautes-Alpes

== P ==
Name	Group	Department
Arthur Paecht	UDF	Var
Dominique Paillé	UDF	Deux-Sèvres
Françoise de Panafieu	RPR	Paris
Robert Pandraud	RPR	Seine-Saint-Denis
Monique Papon	UDF	Loire-Atlantique
Pierre Pascallon	RPR	Puy-de-Dôme
Pierre Pasquini	RPR	Haute-Corse
Michel Pelchat	UDF	Essonne
Jacques Pélissard	RPR	Jura
Daniel Pennec	a. RPR	Côtes-d'Armor
Dominique Perben	RPR	Saône-et-Loire
Jean-Jacques de Peretti	RPR	Dordogne
Michel Péricard	RPR	Yvelines
Pierre-André Périssol	RPR	Allier
Francisque Perrut	UDF	Rhône
Pierre Petit	RPR	Martinique
Alain Peyrefitte	RPR	Seine-et-Marne
Jean-Pierre Philibert	UDF	Loire
Yann Piat	UDF	Var
Daniel Picotin	UDF	Gironde
Louis Pierna	PCF	Seine-Saint-Denis
Jean-Pierre Pierre-Bloch	UDF	Paris
André-Maurice Pihouée	RPR	La Réunion
Xavier Pintat	UDF	Gironde
Étienne Pinte	RPR	Yvelines
Serge Poignant	RPR	Loire-Atlantique
Ladislas Poniatowski	UDF	Eure
Bernard Pons	RPR	Paris
Jean-Pierre Pont	UDF	Pas-de-Calais
Marcel Porcher	RPR	Val-d'Oise
Robert Poujade	RPR	Côte-d'Or
Alain Poyart	RPR	Nord
Jean-Luc Préel	UDF	Vendée
Claude Pringalle	RPR	Nord
Jean Proriol	UDF	Haute-Loire

== Q ==
Name	Group	Department
Paul Quilès	PS	Tarn
Pierre Quillet	RPR	Seine-et-Marne

== R ==
Name	Group	Department
Jean-Bernard Raimond	RPR	Bouches-du-Rhône
Éric Raoult	RPR	Seine-Saint-Denis
Jean-Luc Reitzer	RPR	Haut-Rhin
Charles Revet	UDF	Seine-Maritime
Marc Reymann	UDF	Bas-Rhin
Georges Richard	RPR	Lot-et-Garonne
Henri de Richemont	RPR	Charente
Jean Rigaud	UDF	Rhône
Simone Rignault	RPR	Nièvre
Pierre Rinaldi	RPR	Alpes-de-Haute-Provence
Yves Rispat	a. RPR	Gers
Jean Roatta	UDF	Bouches-du-Rhône
Gilles de Robien	UDF	Somme
Jean-Paul de Rocca Serra	RPR	Corse-du-Sud
François Rochebloine	UDF	Loire
Alain Rodet	PS	Haute-Vienne
Marie-Josée Roig	RPR	Vaucluse
Marcel Roques	UDF	Hérault
Serge Roques	UDF	Aveyron
Jean Rosselot	RPR	Territoire de Belfort
André Rossi	UDF	Aisne
José Rossi	UDF	Corse-du-Sud
André Rossinot	UDF	Meurthe-et-Moselle
Monique Rousseau	RPR	Doubs
François Roussel	RPR	Dordogne
Yves Rousset-Rouard	UDF	Vaucluse
Michel Roussin	RPR	Paris
Max Roustan	UDF	Gard
Jean-Marie Roux	RPR	Ardèche
Xavier de Roux	UDF	Charente-Maritime
Ségolène Royal	PS	Deux-Sèvres
Jean Royer	Non inscrit	Indre-et-Loire
Antoine Rufenacht	RPR	Seine-Maritime

== S ==
Name	Group	Department
Francis Saint-Ellier	UDF	Calvados
Frédéric de Saint-Sernin	RPR	Dordogne
Rudy Salles	UDF	Alpes-Maritimes
André Santini	UDF	Hauts-de-Seine
Nicolas Sarkozy	RPR	Hauts-de-Seine
Joël Sarlot	UDF	Vendée
Georges Sarre	PS	Paris
Bernard Saugey	UDF	Isère
Gérard Saumade	Non inscrit	Hérault
François Sauvadet	UDF	Côte-d'Or
Suzanne Sauvaigo	RPR	Alpes-Maritimes
Bernard Schreiner	RPR	Bas-Rhin
Roger-Gérard Schwartzenberg	a. PS	Val-de-Marne
Philippe Séguin	RPR	Vosges
Jean Seitlinger	UDF	Moselle
Bernard Serrou	RPR	Hérault
Henri Sicre	PS	Pyrénées-Orientales
Jean-Pierre Soisson	Non inscrit	Yonne
Daniel Soulage	UDF	Lot-et-Garonne
Alain Suguenot	RPR	Côte-d'Or

== T ==
Name	Group	Department
Frantz Taittinger	Non inscrit	Hauts-de-Seine
Bernard Tapie	Non inscrit	Bouches-du-Rhône
Jean Tardito	PCF	Bouches-du-Rhône
Christiane Taubira-Delannon	Non inscrit	Guyane
Guy Teissier	UDF	Bouches-du-Rhône
Paul-Louis Tenaillon	UDF	Yvelines
Michel Terrot	RPR	Rhône
André Thien Ah Koon	Non inscrit	La Réunion
Jean-Claude Thomas	RPR	Marne
Jean-Pierre Thomas	UDF	Vosges
Franck Thomas-Richard	UDF	Cher
Jean Tiberi	RPR	Paris
Jacques Toubon	RPR	Paris
Alfred Trassy-Paillogues	RPR	Seine-Maritime
Gérard Trémège	UDF	Hautes-Pyrénées
André Trigano	a. UDF	Ariège
Georges Tron	RPR	Essonne
Anicet Turinay	a. RPR	Martinique

== U ==
Name	Group	Department
Jean Ueberschlag	RPR	Haut-Rhin
Jean Urbaniak	Non inscrit	Pas-de-Calais

== V ==
Name	Group	Department
Léon Vachet	RPR	Bouches-du-Rhône
Jean Valleix	RPR	Gironde
Yves Van Haecke	RPR	Yonne
Christian Vanneste	RPR	Nord
François Vannson	a. RPR	Vosges
Philippe Vasseur	UDF	Pas-de-Calais
Paul Vergès	Non inscrit	La Réunion
Jacques Vernier	RPR	Nord
Françoise de Veyrinas	UDF	Haute-Garonne
Gérard Vignoble	UDF	Nord
Philippe de Villiers	UDF	Vendée
Jean-Paul Virapoullé	UDF	La Réunion
Claude Vissac	a. RPR	Ardennes
Robert-André Vivien	RPR	Val-de-Marne
Gérard Voisin	UDF	Saône-et-Loire
Michel Voisin	UDF	Ain
Michel Vuibert	UDF	Ardennes
Roland Vuillaume	RPR	Doubs

== W ==
Name	Group	Department
Aloyse Warhouver	Non inscrit	Moselle
Jean-Jacques Weber	UDF	Haut-Rhin
Pierre-André Wiltzer	UDF	Essonne

== Z ==
Name	Group	Department
Adrien Zeller	UDF	Bas-Rhin
Émile Zuccarelli	Non inscrit	Haute-Corse
