= Philippe Bonnecarrère =

French politician (born 1955)

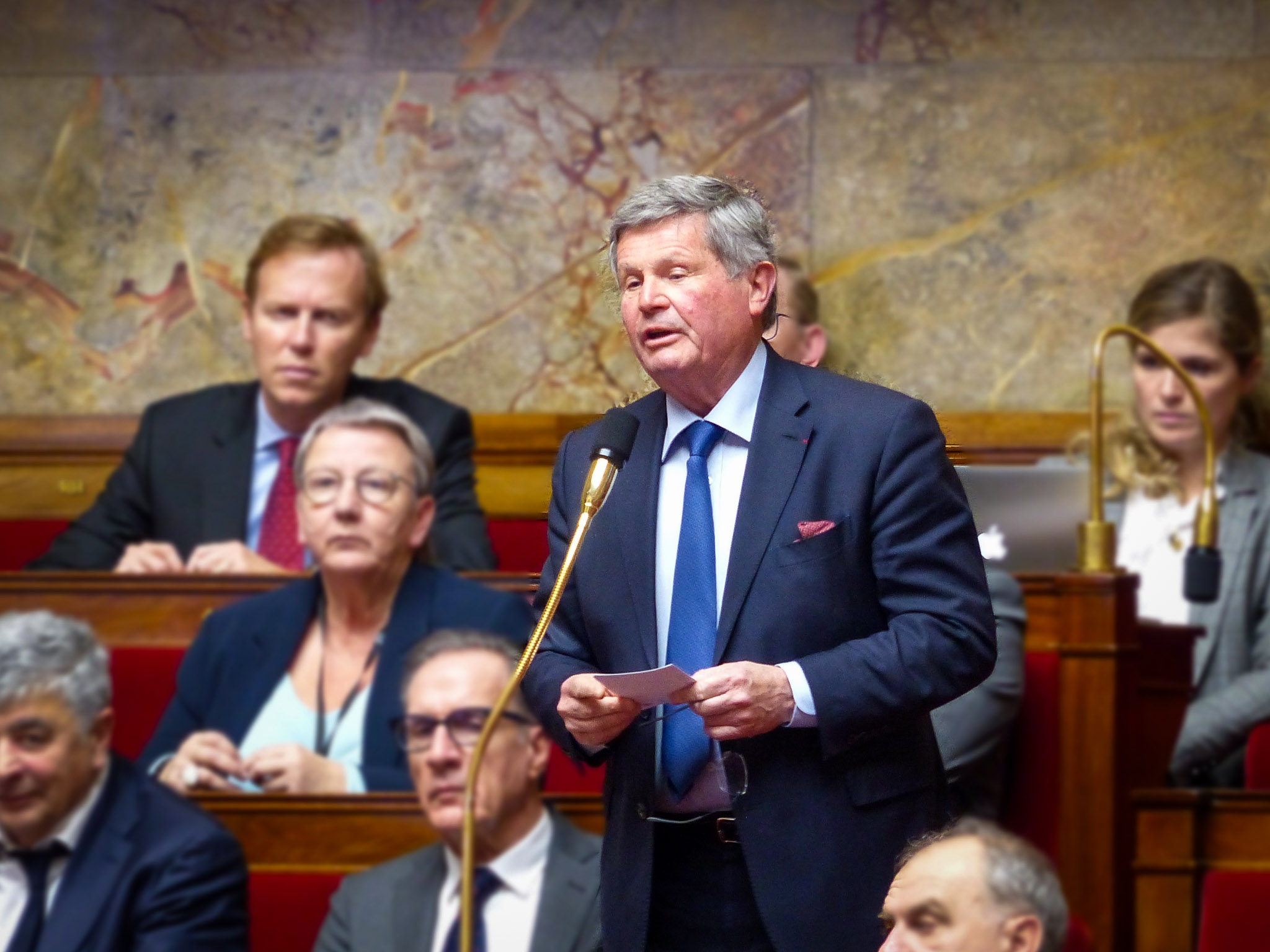
- Bonnecarrère in 2025

Member of the National Assembly for Tarn
- Incumbent
- Assumed office 8 July 2024
- Preceded by: Frédéric Cabrolier
- Constituency: 1st
- In office 2 April 1993 – 21 April 1997
- Preceded by: Charles Pistre
- Succeeded by: Thierry Carcenac
- Constituency: 2nd

Senator for Tarn
- In office 1 October 2014 – 27 September 2024
- Preceded by: Jacqueline Alquier
- Succeeded by: Marie-Lise Housseau

Mayor of Albi
- In office 24 June 1995 – 5 April 2014
- Preceded by: Michel Castel
- Succeeded by: Stéphanie Guiraud-Chaumeil

Personal details
- Born: Philippe Henri Marie Bonnecarrère; 12 July 1955 (age 71) Toulouse, France
- Party: Centrist Alliance (since 2020)
- Other political affiliations: Rally for the Republic (1988–2002); Union of Democrats and Independents (2014–2016)
- Occupation: Lawyer

Philippe Henri Marie Bonnecarrère (French pronunciation: [filip bɔnkaʁɛʁ]; born 12 July 1955) is a French lawyer and politician of the Centrist Alliance who has represented the 1st constituency of Tarn in the National Assembly since 2024. He sits with the Non-Attached Members. Bonnecarrère previously represented the 2nd constituency from 1993 to 1997 as a member of the Rally for the Republic.

Bonnecarrère also served as mayor of Albi from 1995 to 2014, as president of the Communauté d'agglomération de l'Albigeois from 2005 to 2017 and as a senator for Tarn from 2014 until his resignation in 2024 following his return to the National Assembly. He was also first vice president of the Regional Council of Midi-Pyrénées from 1986 to 1993 and a member of the General Council of Tarn for Albi-Sud from 1985 to 1995 and Albi-Est from 1998 to 2008.

== Honours ==
- Knight of the Legion of Honour (2003)

== See also ==
- List of deputies of the 10th National Assembly of France
- List of deputies of the 17th National Assembly of France
- List of senators of Tarn
