= Étienne de Voisins-Lavernière =

French politician (1813–1898)

Marius Étienne de Voisins-Lavernière
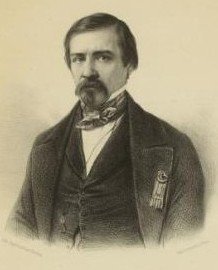
- Voisins-Lavernière in 1848 by Achille Devéria

Deputy of Tarn
- In office 23 April 1848 – 26 May 1849

Senator of Tarn
- In office 30 January 1876 – 29 November 1881

Life Senator
- In office 29 November 1881 – 20 January 1898

Personal details
- Born: 17 May 1813 Lavaur, Tarn, France
- Died: 20 January 1898 (aged 84) Lavaur, Tarn, France

Marius Étienne de Voisins-Lavernière (17 May 1813 – 20 January 1898) was a French landowner and politician. He was a Deputy of Tarn during the French Second Republic, then Senator of Tarn during the French Third Republic.

== Early years (1813–48) ==
Marius Étienne de Voisins-Lavernière was born on 17 May 1813 in Lavaur, Tarn, France. His parents were Marius de Voisins-Lavernière (1786–1865) and Jeanne de Voisins-Lapeyrotte (1792–1866). On his father side he came from an old Catholic and royalist family, originally from Albi, that had been prominent in local administrative and political life for a century and was ennobled by letters patent on 31 May 1817. His grandfather, born in 1744, was a lawyer and president-treasurer of the Toulouse Bureau of Finance who married the daughter of the Marquis de Corn du Peyroux. His father was a wealthy landowner, mayor of Lavaur, General Councilor of Tarn and a royalist deputy in 1830–31.

== Second Republic (1848–51) ==
During the French Second Republic Voisins-Lavernière was Deputy of Tarn in the National Constituent Assembly from 23 April 1848 to 26 May 1849. He did not speak in the assembly, but often voted with the right. He was a member of the foreign affairs committee. He generally voted with the right, including votes for the prosecution of Louis Blanc and Marc Caussidière, against abolition of the death penalty, against the amendment by Jules Grévy to suppress the presidency, against the right to work, for the proposal of Jean-Pierre Rateau to dissolve the Constituent Assembly, against amnesty, for the prohibition of clubs and for credits for the expedition to Rome to destroy the Roman Republic and restore the Pope . However, he voted with the left against reinstatement of the bond, against restoration of debtors' prison, for reduction of the salt tax and for abolition of the tax on beverages. He was not re-elected to the Legislature, and remained out of public affairs until 1871.

== Second Empire (1851–70) ==
Voisins-Lavernière abstained from politics during the Second French Empire, and disapproved of its authoritarianism. He lived as one of the leading landowners of Tarn, owners of two châteaux, one in Dûmes near Lavaur, and one in Rouzèges near Saint-Sulpice. He possessed a very large fortune, with three quarters of his income from land. On 21 May 1851 Voisins-Lavernière married Paule Marcassus de Puymaurin (1827–1918) in Toulouse. His wife was the granddaughter of Jean-Pierre Casimir de Marcassus, Baron de Puymaurin. Their children were Marie Adrienne (born 1852) and Pierre (1855–1935). From 1858 he was President of the Agricultural Committee of the canton of Lavaur, where he defended protectionism to maintain the price of cereals. On 28 February 1858 he joined the literary Académie des jeux floraux in Toulouse, where he specialized in the study of contemporary poetry and criticism. He dismissed authors such as Charles Baudelaire, Gustave Flaubert and the Parnassians.

== Third Republic (1870–98) ==
During the French Third Republic, in October 1871 Voisins-Lavernière was elected General Councilor of Tarn, and in 1877 became president of the council. He supported the republic, tried to persuade the conservative peasantry of the value of representative government, and acted as a spokesman for rural interests.

On 30 January 1876 Voisins-Lavernière was elected to the Senate as a Constitutional Republican by 204 votes out of 396. He sat with the center-left, and voted against dissolution of the Chamber of Deputies in June 1877. He voted with the right on questions of religion. He voted against Article 7 of the Jules Ferry Act, against return of the government to Paris, against reform of the judiciary, against divorce. In 1880 he was rapporteur against the draft amnesty to communards adopted by the House. During the discussion on the convocation of ranks in March 1880 he demanded unlimited freedom, equal to all.

On 19 November 1881 Voisins-Lavernière was elected irremovable senator, replacing Émile Fourcand, by 124 votes out of 245 votes, thanks to a coalition of right wing voters with the friends of Jules Simon. His opponent disputed the result but was overridden. Voisins-Laverniere spoke against expulsion of the princes, for reinstatement of the district poll on 13 February 1889, and for the Lisbonne law restricting freedom of the press. He abstained on the voting on the procedure of the high court against General Boulanger. After this his declining health prevented him from taking much part in the Senate. Voisins-Lavernière died on 20 January 1898 in the Château de Dûmes, Lavaur, aged 84.

== Publications ==
Publications by Voisins-Lavernière included:

- Étienne de Voisins Lavernière (1858), Remerciement de M. Étienne de Voisins Lavernière (prononcé en séance publique, le 28 février 1858), Toulouse: Académie des jeux floraux. Toulouse (impr. de Douladoure frères), p. 16
- Étienne de Voisins Lavernière (1862), Académie des Jeux floraux. Semonce lue en séance publique le 23 février 1862, par M. Étienne de Voisins-Lavernière, un des quarante mainteneurs, Toulouse: Académie des jeux floraux. Toulouse (impr. de C. Douladoure), p. 20
- Étienne de Voisins Lavernière (1865), Rapport au Comice agricole de Lavaur, Lavaur: impr. de M. Vidal, p. 16
- Étienne de Voisins Lavernière (1880), Projet de loi relatif à la liberté de l'enseignement supérieur (Discours - Séance du 24 février 1880), Paris: Sénat (A. Wittersheim), p. 39

== Sources ==
- Bernard, Mathias (1995), "VOISINS-LAVERNIÈRE Etienne de 1813-1898", in Jean Marie Mayeur; Alain Corbin; Arlette Schweitz (eds.), Les immortels du Sénat, 1875-1918: les cent seize inamovibles de la Troisième République (in French), Publications de la Sorbonne, ISBN 978-2-85944-273-6
- Etienne de Voisins-Lavernière (in French), Assemblée nationale
- Étienne de Voisins Lavernière (1813-1898) (in French), BnF: Bibliotheque nationale de France
- Jolly, Jean, ed. (1960), "VOISINS-LAVERNIÈRE (ETIENNE DE)", Dictionnaire des parlementaires français de 1889 à 1940, Presses universitaires de France
- Pierfit, "Marius "Etienne" de VOISINS-LAVERNIÈRE", Geneanet (in French)
- Robert, Adolphe; Cougny, Gaston (1889–1891), "VOISINS-LAVERNIÈRE (ETIENNE DE)", in Edgar Bourloton (ed.), Dictionnaire des Parlementaires français (1789–1889) (in French)
