= Tarn's 1st constituency =

Constituency of the National Assembly of France

1st constituency of Tarn
- inline Constituency of the National Assembly of France

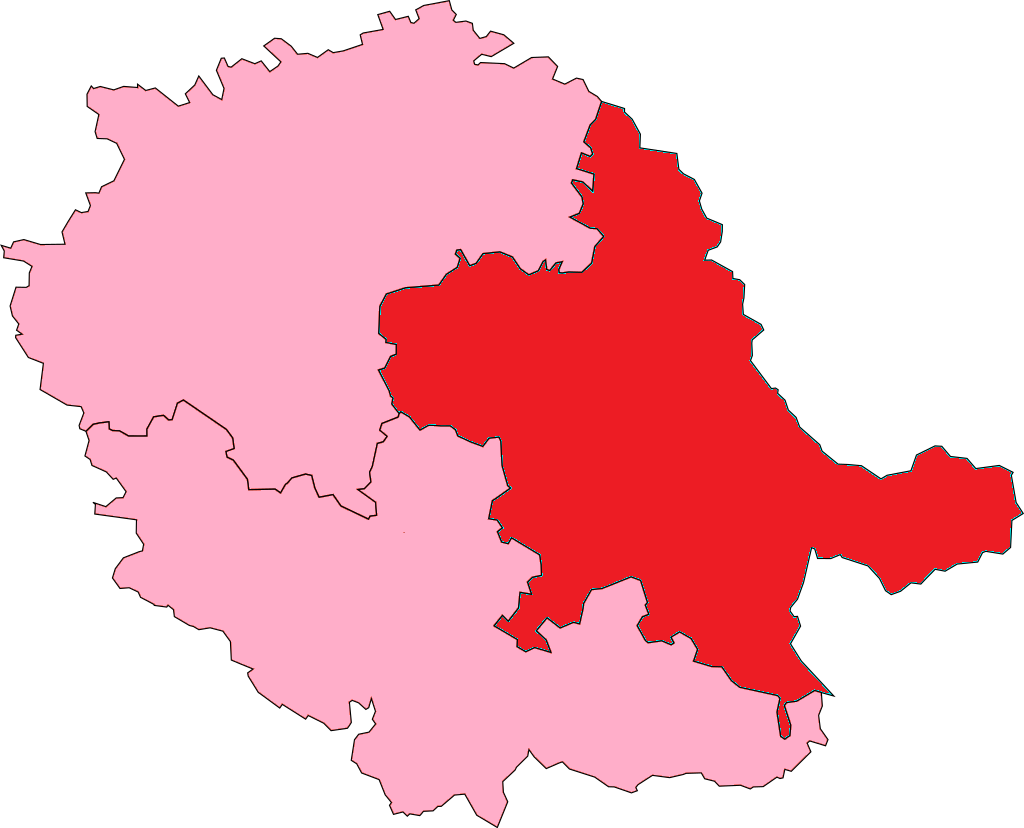
- Tarn's 1st Constituency shown within the Tarn
- Deputy: Philippe Bonnecarrère; DVC
- Department: Tarn
- Cantons: Alban, Albi Centre, Albi Est, Albi Sud, Anglès, Brassac, Castres-Est, Castres Sud, Lacaune, Montredon-Labessonnié, Murat-sur-Vèbre, Réalmont, Rocquecourbe, Vabre, Valence-d'Albigeois, Villefranche-d'Albigeois
- Registered voters: 83,763

The 1st constituency of the Tarn (French: Première circonscription du Tarn) is a French legislative constituency in the Tarn département. Like the other 576 French constituencies, it elects one MP using the two-round system, with a run-off if no candidate receives over 50% of the vote in the first round.

== Description ==
The 1st constituency of Tarn lies in the east of the constituency and includes some of Albi, which it shares with Tarn's 2nd constituency.

After many years of electing centre left PS deputies the seat swung to the right at the 2012 electing Philippe Folliot of the small Centrist Alliance party. In 2022 the constituency shifted even farther to the right, electing Frédéric Cabrolier of National Rally.

== Assembly Members ==
| Election | Member | Party |
|---|---|---|
| 1988 | Pierre Bernard | PS |
| 1993 | Paul Quilès | PS |
| 1997 | Paul Quilès | PS |
| 2002 | Paul Quilès | PS |
| 2007 | Jacques Valax | PS |
| 2012 | Philippe Folliot | AC |
| 2017 | Philippe Folliot | AC |
| 2020 | Muriel Roques-Étienne | LREM |
| 2022 | Frédéric Cabrolier | RN |
| 2024 | Philippe Bonnecarrère | DVC |

== Election results ==
=== 2024 ===
| Candidate | Party | Alliance | First round | | Second round | |
| Candidate | Party | Alliance | Votes | % | Votes | % |
|---|---|---|---|---|---|---|
| Frédéric Cabrolier | RN | | 23,237 | 39.53 | 25,322 | 43.77 |
| Philippe Bonnecarrère | DVC | Ensemble | 17,352 | 29.52 | 32,529 | 56.23 |
| Margot Lapeyre | PS | NFP | 16,673 | 28.37 | | |
| Denis Rouquette | R! | | 769 | 1.31 | | |
| Yann Le Diagon | LO | | 567 | 0.96 | | |
| Orphée Pauthier | Ind | DVG | 178 | 0.30 | | |
| Valid votes | | | 58,776 | 96.71 | 57,851 | 94.83 |
| Blank votes | | | 1,314 | 2.16 | 2,069 | 3.39 |
| Null votes | | | 683 | 1.12 | 1,088 | 1.78 |
| Turnout | | | 60,773 | 71.21 | 61,008 | 71.47 |
| Abstentions | | | 24,571 | 28.71 | 24,536 | 28.53 |
| Registered voters | | | 85,344 | | 85,364 | |
| Result | | | DVC GAIN FROM RN | | | |

=== 2022 ===
Legislative Election 2022: Tarn's 1st constituency
| Party | Candidate | Votes | % | ±% |
|---|---|---|---|---|
| LFI (NUPÉS) | Gérard Poujade | 9,529 | 21.37 | -3.84 |
| RN | Frédéric Cabrolier | 8,999 | 20.18 | +4.55 |
| LREM (Ensemble) | Muriel Roques-Etienne | 8,600 | 19.29 | N/A |
| DVD | Julie Capo Ortega | 4,277 | 9.59 | N/A |
| PS | Etienne Moulin* | 4,186 | 9.39 | N/A |
| DVD | Roland Gilles | 2,391 | 5.36 | N/A |
| LR (UDC) | Rodolphe Pires | 1,856 | 4.16 | −4.00 |
| REC | Stéphane Bardy | 1,489 | 3.34 | N/A |
| LREM | Johann Ricci** | 1,186 | 2.66 | N/A |
| DVE | Patricia Andrieu | 1,075 | 2.41 | N/A |
| Others | N/A | 1,005 | 2.25 | |
| Turnout | | 44,593 | 53.78 | +1.07 |
2nd round result
| RN | Frédéric Cabrolier | 19,125 | 53.09 | +17.60 |
| LFI (NUPÉS) | Gérard Poujade | 16,900 | 46.91 | N/A |
| Turnout | | 36,025 | 51.47 | +9.32 |
| RN gain from AC | | | | |

* PS dissident
** LREM dissident

=== 2017 ===
Legislative Election 2017: Tarn's 1st constituency
| Party | Candidate | Votes | % | ±% |
|---|---|---|---|---|
| AC | Philippe Folliot | 14,404 | 32.62 | |
| FN | Frédéric Cabrolier | 6,903 | 15.63 | |
| DIV | Pierre Laporte | 5,841 | 13.23 | |
| LFI | Tanhinan Hadji | 4,759 | 10.78 | |
| PS | Patrice Bedier | 3,904 | 8.84 | |
| LR | Anne-Michèle Bianchi | 3,604 | 8.16 | |
| EELV | Julia Rivet | 1,550 | 3.51 | |
| PCF | André Boudes | 919 | 2.08 | |
| Others | N/A | 2,272 | | |
| Turnout | | 44,156 | 52.71 | |
2nd round result
| AC | Philippe Folliot | 24,959 | 70.69 | |
| FN | Frédéric Cabrolier | 10,350 | 29.31 | |
| Turnout | | 35,309 | 42.15 | |
| AC hold | | | | |

=== 2012 ===
Legislative Election 2012: Tarn's 1st constituency
| Party | Candidate | Votes | % | ±% |
|---|---|---|---|---|
| PS | Gérard Poujade | 18,985 | 35.71 | |
| AC | Philippe Folliot | 13,090 | 24.62 | |
| UMP | Richard Amalvy | 8,414 | 15.83 | |
| FN | Frédéric Cabrolier | 7,019 | 13.20 | |
| FG | Géraldine Rouquette | 3,267 | 6.14 | |
| EELV | Benoist Couliou | 1,767 | 3.32 | |
| Others | N/A | 624 | | |
| Turnout | | 53,166 | 63.99 | |
2nd round result
| AC | Philippe Folliot | 25,256 | 50.79 | |
| PS | Gérard Poujade | 24,372 | 49.21 | |
| Turnout | | 49,528 | 59.63 | |
| AC gain from PS | | | | |

=== 2007 ===
Legislative Election 2007: Tarn's 1st constituency
| Party | Candidate | Votes | % | ±% |
|---|---|---|---|---|
| PS | Jacques Valax | 13,847 | 37.00 | |
| UMP | Jacqueline Bousquet Salmani | 9,368 | 25.03 | |
| PCF | Roland Foissac | 5,590 | 14.94 | |
| DVD | Frédéric Esquevin | 2,954 | 7.89 | |
| FN | Frédéric Cabrolier | 1,508 | 4.03 | |
| LV | Guillaume Cros | 1,090 | 2.91 | |
| Far left | Claude Roelens-Dequidt | 910 | 2.43 | |
| Others | N/A | 2,157 | | |
| Turnout | | 38,785 | 67.52 | |
2nd round result
| PS | Jacques Valax | 22,744 | 62.67 | |
| UMP | Jacqueline Bousquet Salmani | 13,545 | 37.33 | |
| Turnout | | 38,648 | 67.28 | |
| PS hold | | | | |

=== 2002 ===
Legislative Election 2002: Tarn's 1st constituency
| Party | Candidate | Votes | % | ±% |
|---|---|---|---|---|
| PS | Paul Quiles | 16,234 | 41.35 | |
| UMP | Richard de Putmorin | 5,562 | 14.17 | |
| DVD | Frédéric Esquevin | 5,290 | 13.47 | |
| FN | Frédéric Cabrolier | 3,725 | 9.49 | |
| PCF | Rolland Foissac | 3,511 | 8.94 | |
| LV | Guillaume Cros | 1,157 | 2.95 | |
| CPNT | Colette Resplandy | 1,078 | 2.75 | |
| LCR | Gilles Jeanjean | 967 | 2.46 | |
| Others | N/A | 1,740 | | |
| Turnout | | 40,750 | 72.68 | |
2nd round result
| PS | Paul Quiles | 21,527 | 61.09 | |
| UMP | Richard de Putmorin | 13,714 | 38.91 | |
| Turnout | | 38,053 | 67.87 | |
| PS hold | | | | |

=== 1997 ===
Legislative Election 1997: Tarn's 1st constituency
| Party | Candidate | Votes | % | ±% |
|---|---|---|---|---|
| PS | Paul Quiles | 16,561 | 42.16 | |
| UDF | Richard Canac | 8,827 | 22.47 | |
| PCF | Nelly Foissac | 4,835 | 12.31 | |
| FN | Frédéric Cabrolier | 3,962 | 10.09 | |
| DVD | Jean-Marc Vieules | 1,464 | 3.73 | |
| LV | Rosine Caminade | 1,418 | 3.61 | |
| Others | N/A | 2,210 | | |
| Turnout | | 45,858 | 82.95 | |
2nd round result
| PS | Paul Quiles | 25,514 | 64.77 | |
| UDF | Richard Canac | 13,879 | 35.23 | |
| Turnout | | 42,733 | 77.31 | |
| PS hold | | | | |
