= List of senators of Tarn =

Department of Tarn in France

Following is a List of senators of Tarn, people who have represented the department of Tarn in the Senate of France.

== Third Republic ==
- Étienne de Voisins-Lavernière (1876–1881), then inamovible from 1881 to 1898
- Sylvain Espinasse (1879–1882)
- Pascal Rigal (1882–1889)
- Édouard Barbey (1882–1905)
- Bertrand Lavergne (1889–1900)
- Adrien Gay de Savary (1898–1927)
- Louis Boularan (1900–1909)
- Louis Vieu (1905–1931)
- Paul Gouzy (1909–1919)
- Édouard Andrieu (1920–1936)
- Pierre Loubat (1927–1940)
- Fernand Lavergne (1931–1940)
- Laurent Camboulives (1936–1940)

== Fourth Republic ==
- Marcel Grimal (1946–1952)
- François Monsarrat (1952–1959)
- Fernand Verdeille (1946–1959)

== Fifth Republic ==
- François Monsarrat (1959–1968)
- Fernand Verdeille (1959–1974)
- Louis Brives (1968–1995)
- Frédéric Bourguet (1974–1977)
- Georges Spénale (1977–1983)
- Jacques Durand (1983–1986)
- François Delga (1986–1995)
- Georges Mazars (1995–1998)
- Roger Lagorsse (1998–2004)
- Jacqueline Alquier (PS) (2004–2014)
- Jean-Marc Pastor (PS) (1995–2014)
- Philippe Bonnecarrère from 2014
- Thierry Carcenac from 2014
