= Castelnau-de-Brassac =

Commune in Tarn, France

Castelnau de Brassac
- Part of Fontrieu
- Coat of arms
- Location of Castelnau de Brassac
- Location within France Location within Occitanie
- Coordinates: 43°38′59″N 2°30′54″E
- Country: France
- Region: Occitania
- Department: Tarn
- Arrondissement: Castres
- Canton: Les Hautes Terres d'Oc
- Commune: Fontrieu
- Area^{1}: 72.88 km^{2} (28.14 sq mi)
- Elevation: 520 m (1,710 ft)
- Highest elevation: 1,137 m (3,730 ft)
- Lowest elevation: 396 m (1,299 ft)
- Population (2018): 733
  - Density: 10.1/km^{2} (26.0/sq mi)
- Time zone: UTC+01:00 (CET)
  - Summer (DST): UTC+02:00 (CEST)
- Postal code: 81260
- ^{1} French Land Register data, which excludes lakes, ponds, glaciers > 1 km^{2} (0.386 sq mi or 247 acres) and river estuaries.

Castelnau-de-Brassac (French pronunciation: [kastɛlno də bʁasak]; Languedocien: Castèlnòu de Braçac) is a former commune in the Tarn department in southern France. On 1 January 2016, it was merged into the new commune of Fontrieu.

== See also ==
- Communes of the Tarn department
