= Marie-Christine Verdier-Jouclas =

French politician

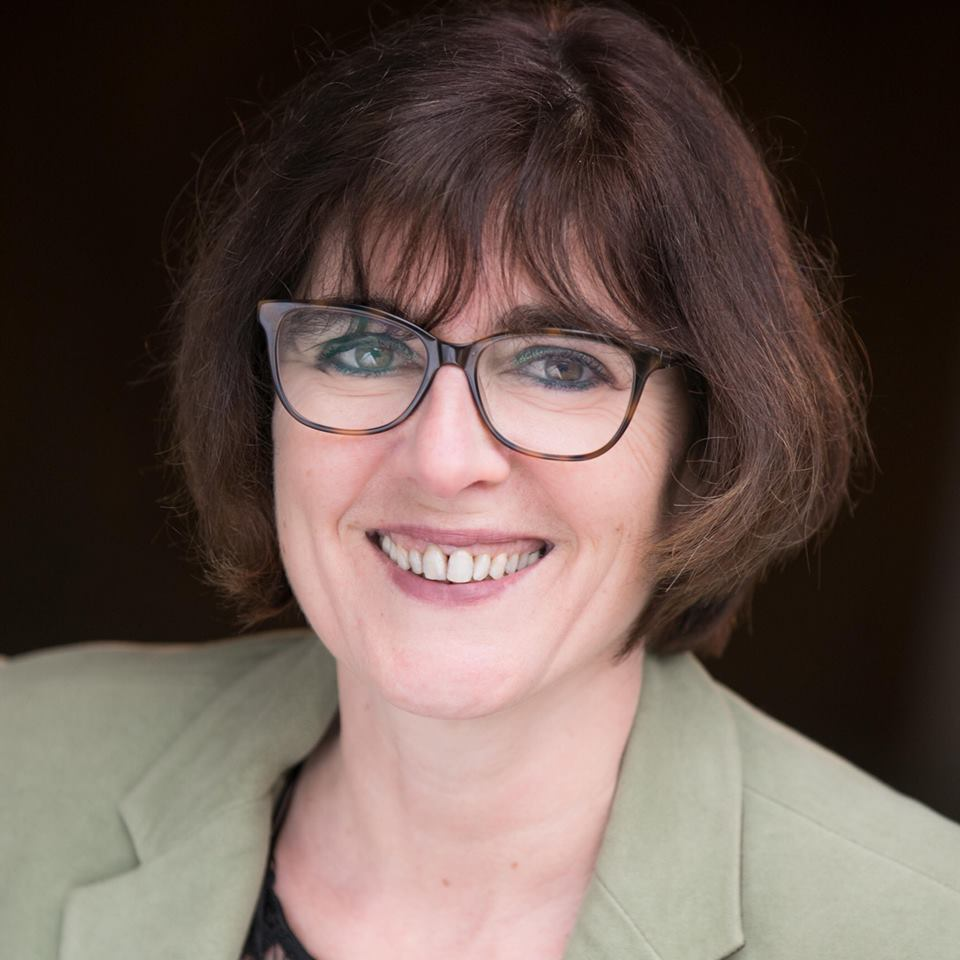

Member of the National Assembly for Tarn's 2nd constituency
- In office 21 June 2017 – 21 June 2022
- Preceded by: Jacques Valax
- Succeeded by: Karen Erodi

Personal details
- Born: 19 March 1965 (age 61) Albi, France
- Party: La République En Marche

Marie-Christine Verdier-Jouclas (born 19 March 1965 in Albi) is a French politician representing La République En Marche! She was elected to the French National Assembly on 18 June 2017, representing the department of Tarn. In the June 2022 election she was narrowly defeated in the second round by Karen Erodi of LFI.

== Political career ==
In parliament, Verdier-Jouclas served on the Finance Committee. She was also a member of the parliamentary friendship groups with Gabon, Jamaica and Morocco.

In addition to her committee assignments, Verdier-Jouclas has been a member of the French delegation to the Parliamentary Assembly of the Council of Europe since 2017. In this capacity, she served on the Committee on Migration, Refugees and Displaced Persons and the Sub-Committee on Integration. She was selected as the Assembly’s rapporteur on disaster preparedness in 2019.

As of 2019, Verdier-Jouclas served as one of her parliamentary group's spokespersons under the leadership of its chairman Gilles Le Gendre.

== Political positions ==
In May 2018, Verdier-Jouclas co-sponsored an initiative in favour of a bioethics law extending to homosexual and single women free access to fertility treatments such as in vitro fertilisation (IVF) under France's national health insurance; it was one of the campaign promises of President Emmanuel Macron and marked the first major social reform of his five-year term.

In September 2018, following the appointment of François de Rugy to the government, Verdier-Jouclas supported the candidacy of Richard Ferrand as president of the National Assembly.

== See also ==
- 2017 French legislative election
- 2022 French legislative election
