= Thierry Carcenac =

French politician

Member of the French Senate for Tarn
- In office 1 October 2014 – 30 September 2020

Member of the National Assembly for Tarn's 2nd constituency
- In office 12 June 1997 – 19 June 2012
- Preceded by: Philippe Bonnecarrère
- Succeeded by: Jacques Valax

Personal details
- Born: 19 December 1950 (age 75) Lescure-d'Albigeois, France
- Party: Socialist Party
- Profession: Tax inspector

Thierry Carcenac (born 19 December 1950) is a member of the National Assembly of France. He represents the Tarn department, and is a member of the Socialiste, radical, citoyen et divers gauche.

== Biography ==
From a modest background, Thierry Carcenac was a tax inspector who was elected municipal councilor of Lescure-d'Albigeois in 1976, then elected general councilor in the canton of Albi-Nord-Est in 1979, before becoming first deputy mayor of his municipality in 1983. In the 1980s and 1990s, Thierry Carcenac served as a special advisor to several ministers (Édith Cresson, Michel Charasse, Martin Malvy). In 1991, upon the death of Jacques Durand, he succeeded him as president of the Tarn General Council. In addition to his duties as a local elected official, Thierry Carcenac was a member of the House of Representatives from 1997 to 2012, and then a senator from 2014 onwards. During his campaign for the senatorial elections, he defended the construction of the Sivens dam, of which he was one of the main promoters as president of the General Council.

When, on the night of October 25-26, 2014, a 21-year-old opponent of the dam project, Rémi Fraisse, was killed on site by a Grenade thrown by a gendarme, Thierry Carcenac said of the young man's death: "Dying for your beliefs is one thing, but it's still relatively stupid and foolish."

In March 2015, he was elected departmental councilor for the Canton of Albi-4 alongside Élisabeth Claverie. Following the second round of departmental elections, which saw his majority come out on top (13 cantons out of 23), Thierry Carcenac was re-elected as head of the Tarn department on April 2. The outgoing president obtained 28 votes. Philippe Folliot (UDI), also a candidate for the presidency, received 18 votes.
