= Claire Fita =

French politician of the Socialist Party (born 1976)

Claire Fita MEP
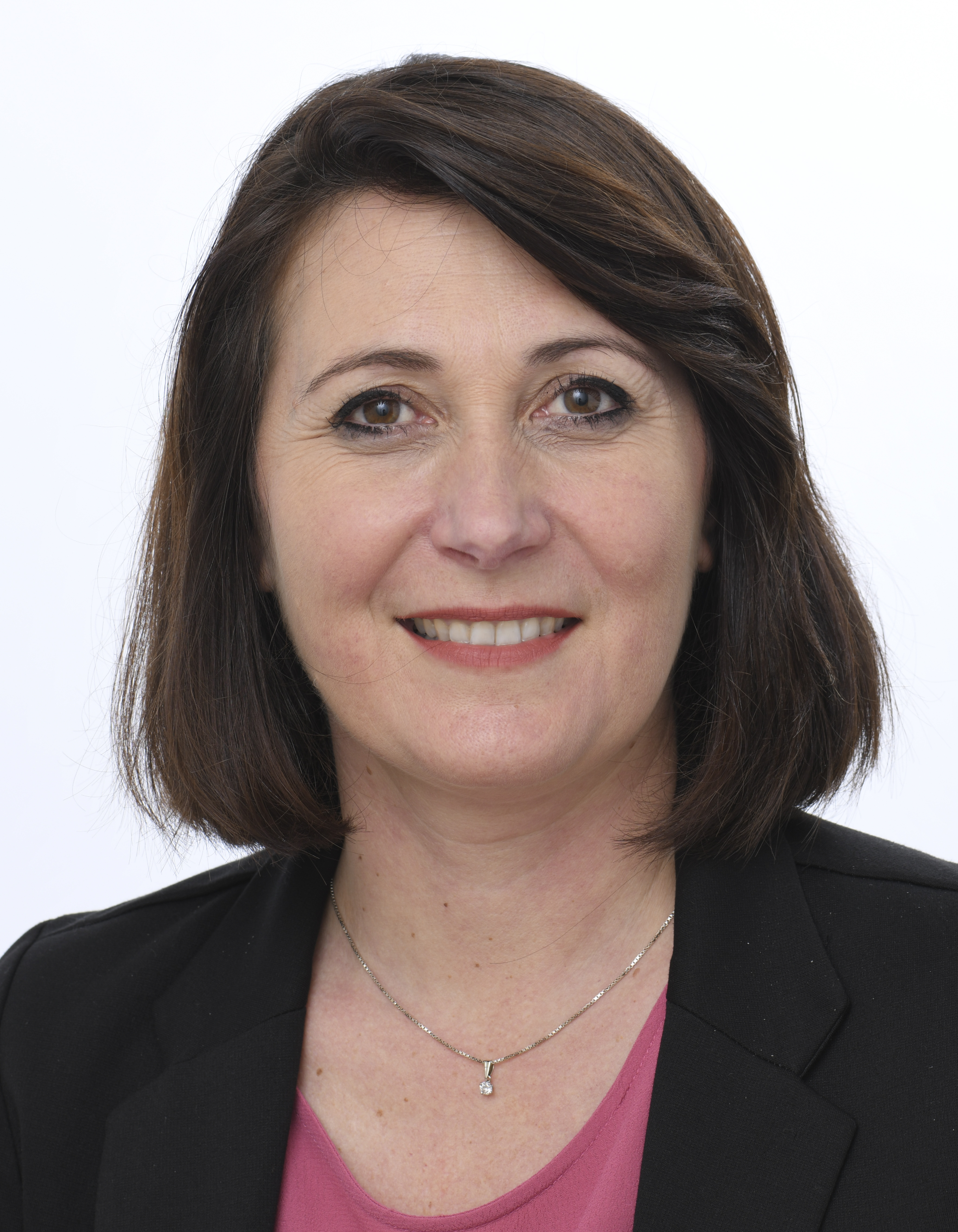
- Fita in June 2024

Member of the European Parliament for France
- Incumbent
- Assumed office 16 July 2024

Personal details
- Born: 31 December 1976 (age 49) Toulouse, France
- Party: Socialist Party
- Other political affiliations: Progressive Alliance of Socialists and Democrats

Claire Fita (born 31 December 1976) is a French politician of the Socialist Party who was elected member of the European Parliament in 2024. In June 2024 she was elected as a Member of the European Parliament for the 2024–2029 period, as a candidate the Socialist Party (PS). In 2016 she became a regional councillor for the Occitania region of France and has also served as the deputy mayor of Graulhet.

== Early life and education ==
Fita was born in Toulouse in 1976. Her grandparents had been Spanish republican refugees. She graduated from the Institute of Political Studies of Toulouse in 1997 and also studied at the Regional Institute of Administration (IRA) of Nantes, graduating in 2000. She then went on to work in the education sector.

== Political career ==
As a member of PS, Fita served as deputy mayor of Graulhet in the Tarn department between 2008 and 2014, later being a city councillor. In 2015 she was elected as a councillor of the newly created Occitania region, where she served on the Committee on Agriculture, Agri-food and Viticulture and the Committee on Culture, Heritage and Regional Languages. In 2021, she joined the region's executive team as vice-president for culture, heritage and regional languages.In the 2017 French legislative election she was a candidate for Tarn's 2nd constituency.

In 2024, as a representative of the PS and Place Publique coalition, she was elected as a member of the European Parliament for 2024–2029. In common with other members of the coalition she became a member of the Progressive Alliance of Socialists and Democrats (S&D) group in the parliament. She became a member of the parliament's Committee on Economic and Monetary Affairs.
