= Le Margnès =

- Part of Fontrieu
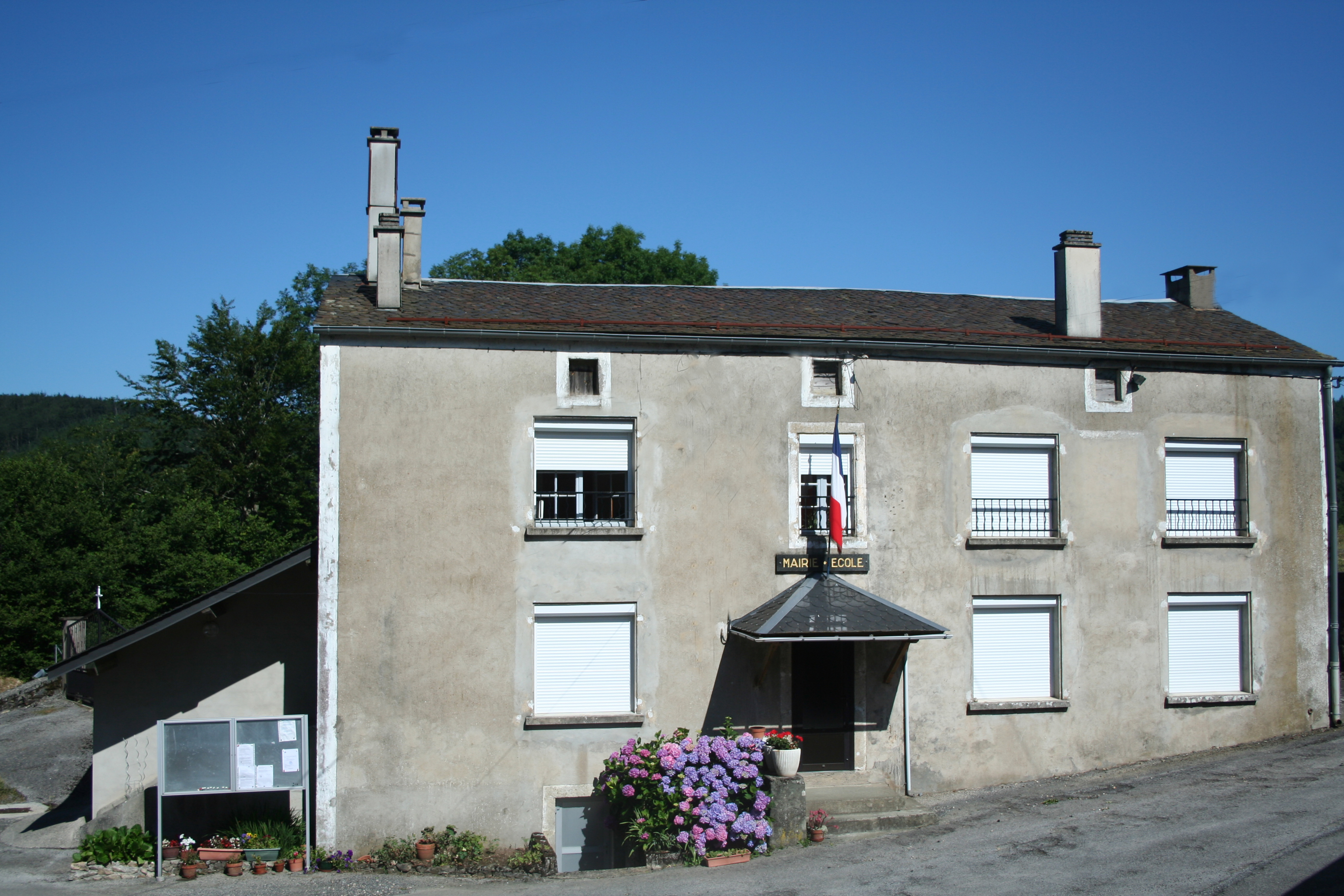
- The town hall in Le Margnès
- Location of Le Margnès
- Location within France Location within Occitanie
- Coordinates: 43°38′31″N 2°36′07″E
- Country: France
- Region: Occitania
- Department: Tarn
- Arrondissement: Castres
- Canton: Les Hautes Terres d'Oc
- Commune: Fontrieu
- Area^{1}: 17.89 km^{2} (6.91 sq mi)
- Elevation: 900 m (3,000 ft)
- Highest elevation: 1,070 m (3,510 ft)
- Lowest elevation: 736 m (2,415 ft)
- Population (2018): 50
  - Density: 2.8/km^{2} (7.2/sq mi)
- Time zone: UTC+01:00 (CET)
  - Summer (DST): UTC+02:00 (CEST)
- Postal code: 81260
- ^{1} French Land Register data, which excludes lakes, ponds, glaciers > 1 km^{2} (0.386 sq mi or 247 acres) and river estuaries.

Le Margnès (French pronunciation: [lə maʁɲɛs]; Languedocien: Lo Marnhès) is a former commune in the Tarn department in southern France. On 1 January 2016, it was merged into the new commune of Fontrieu.

== See also ==
- Communes of the Tarn department
