= Fontrieu =

- Commune
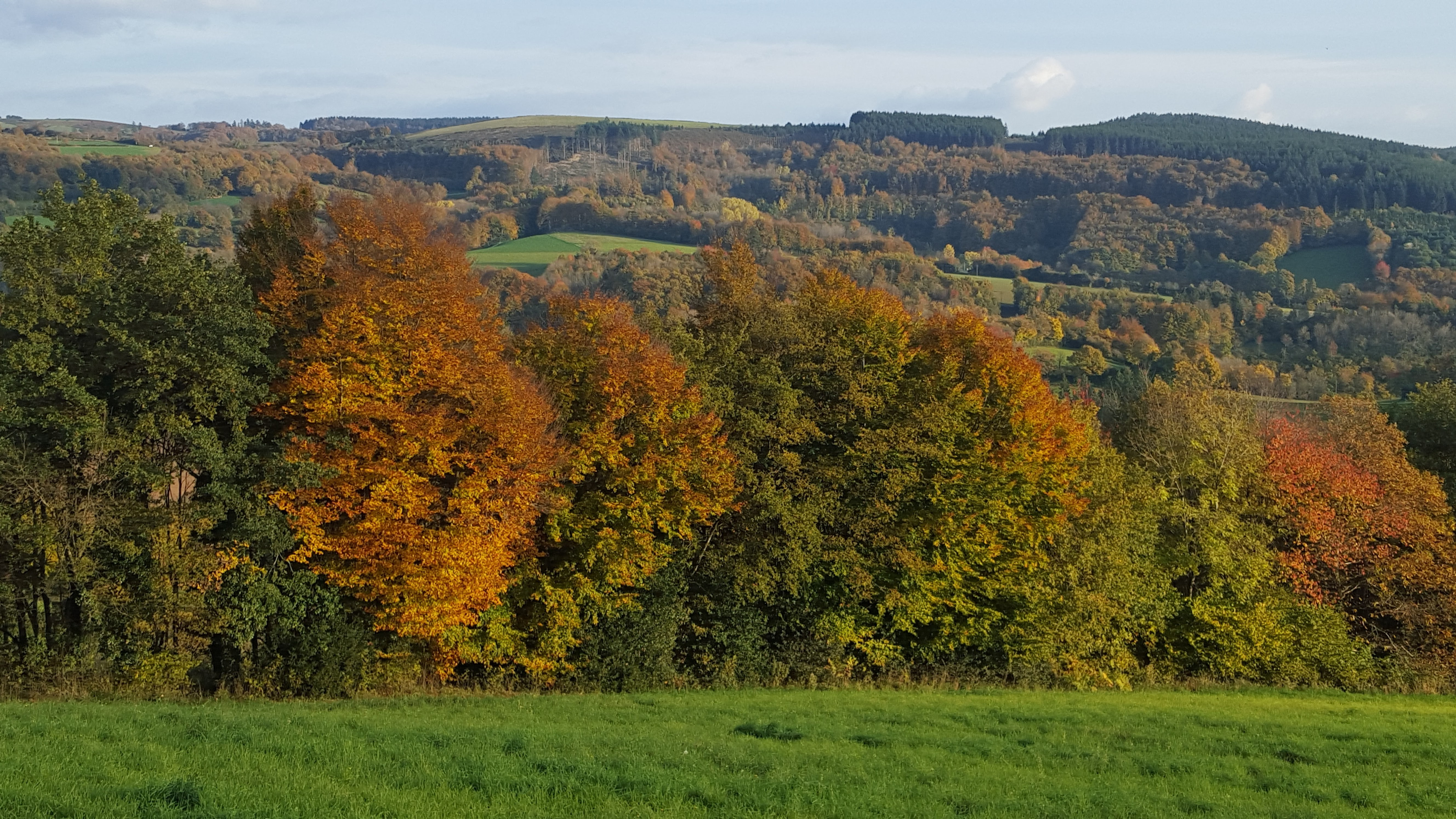
- A panorama of the Fontrieu landscape
- Location of Fontrieu
- Location within France Location within Occitanie
- Coordinates: 43°38′56″N 2°30′50″E
- Country: France
- Region: Occitania
- Department: Tarn
- Arrondissement: Castres
- Canton: Les Hautes Terres d'Oc

Government
  - Mayor (2020–2026): Didier Gavalda
- Area^{1}: 102.62 km^{2} (39.62 sq mi)
- Population (2023): 968
  - Density: 9.43/km^{2} (24.4/sq mi)
- Time zone: UTC+01:00 (CET)
  - Summer (DST): UTC+02:00 (CEST)
- INSEE/Postal code: 81062 /81260
- ^{1} French Land Register data, which excludes lakes, ponds, glaciers > 1 km^{2} (0.386 sq mi or 247 acres) and river estuaries.

Fontrieu (French pronunciation: [fɔ̃ʁjø]; Occitan: Fontriu) is a commune in the Tarn department and Occitanie region of southern France. The municipality was established on 1 January 2016 by merger of the former communes of Castelnau-de-Brassac, Ferrières and Le Margnès.

== See also ==
- Communes of the Tarn department
