= Jacques Valax =

French politician

Member of the National Assembly for Tarn's 2nd constituency
- In office 20 June 2012 – 20 June 2017
- Preceded by: Thierry Carcenac
- Succeeded by: Marie-Christine Verdier-Jouclas

Member of the National Assembly for Tarn's 1st constituency
- In office 20 June 2007 – 19 June 2012
- Preceded by: Paul Quilès
- Succeeded by: Philippe Folliot

Personal details
- Born: 23 August 1951 (age 73); Albi, France
- Political party: Socialist Party
- Profession: Lawyer

Jacques Valax (born August 23, 1951 in Albi, Tarn) is a member of the National Assembly of France. He represents the Tarn department, and is a member of the Socialiste, radical, citoyen et divers gauche.
