= Muriel Roques-Étienne =

French politician

Muriel Roques-Étienne (born 5 March 1979) is a French politician of La République En Marche! (LREM) who served as a member of the National Assembly from 2020 to 2022, representing Tarn's 1st constituency.

== Biography ==
Roques-Étienne was born in Albi, Tarn. In the 2020 French municipal elections, Roques-Étienne withdrew her mayoral candidacy having qualified for the second round, in order to not split the vote and allow what she described as a far-left candidacy to win. In October that year, she was sworn into the National Assembly as the replacement for Philippe Folliot representing Tarn's 1st constituency, as he had won a seat in the Senate.

In October 2021, she was threatened and called a Nazi and collaborator in graffiti on her offices, when she voted in favour of vaccine passports.

Roques-Étienne lost her seat in the 2022 French legislative election, taking 19.29% in the first round behind the candidates of the New Ecologic and Social People's Union and National Rally. The seat was taken by Frédéric Cabrolier from the National Rally in the second round.
