= 1992 French cantonal elections =

Cantonale elections to renew canton general councillors were held in France on 22 and 29 March 1992. The left, in power since 1988, lost 6 departments.

== Electoral system ==
The cantonales elections use the same system as the regional or legislative elections. There is a 10% threshold (10% of registered voters) needed to proceed to the second round.

== Change in control ==
=== From left to right ===
- Nord
- Puy-de-Dôme
- Drôme
- Gers
- Dordogne
- Vaucluse

== National results ==
Party/Alliance	% (first round)	% (second round)
PS	19.00%	24.72%
UDF	14.85%	19.09%
RPR	14.51%	19.99%
Miscellaneous Right	13.47%	14.78%
FN	12.31%	6.36%
PCF	9.48%	6.95%
Les Verts	8.00%	1.69%
Miscellaneous Left	4.07%	4.38%
GE	2.04%	0.47%
PRG	0.87%	1.04%
Far-Left	0.85%	0.42%
Regionalists	0.31%	0.11%
Far-Right	0.15%	0.00%
Miscellaneous	0.09%	0.00%

== Sources ==
E-P
