= Ferrières, Tarn =

Ferrières
- Part of Fontrieu
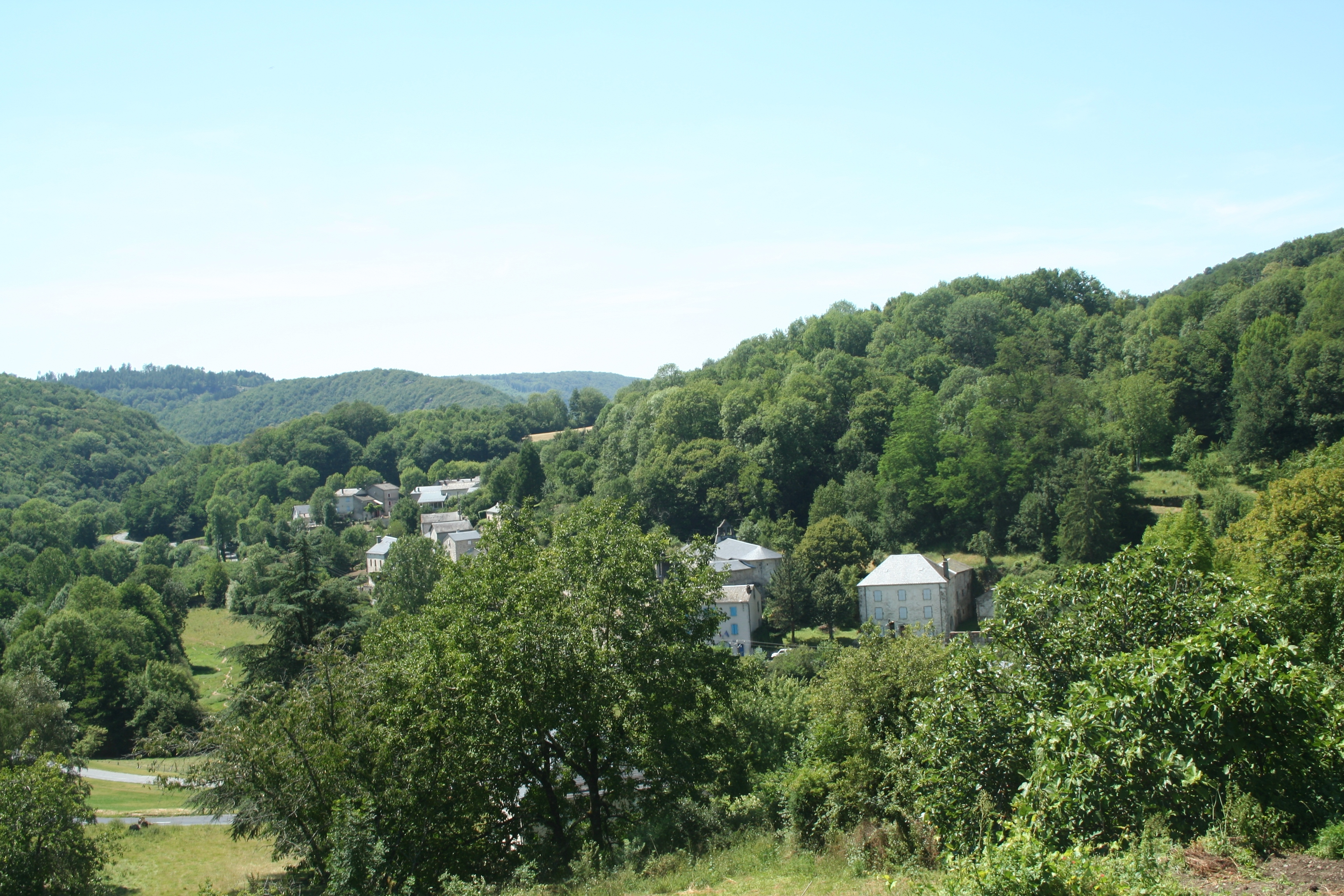
- A general view of Ferrières

- Coat of arms
- Location of Ferrières
- Location within France Location within Occitanie
- Coordinates: 43°39′49″N 2°26′58″E
- Country: France
- Region: Occitania
- Department: Tarn
- Arrondissement: Castres
- Canton: Les Hautes Terres d'Oc
- Commune: Fontrieu
- Area^{1}: 11.85 km^{2} (4.58 sq mi)
- Elevation: 480 m (1,570 ft)
- Highest elevation: 725 m (2,379 ft)
- Lowest elevation: 337 m (1,106 ft)
- Population (2018): 157
  - Density: 13.2/km^{2} (34.3/sq mi)
- Time zone: UTC+01:00 (CET)
  - Summer (DST): UTC+02:00 (CEST)
- Postal code: 81260
- ^{1} French Land Register data, which excludes lakes, ponds, glaciers > 1 km^{2} (0.386 sq mi or 247 acres) and river estuaries.

Ferrières (French pronunciation: [fɛʁjɛʁ]; Languedocien: Ferrièiras) is a former commune in the Tarn department in southern France. On 1 January 2016, it was merged into the new commune of Fontrieu.

== See also ==
- Communes of the Tarn department
