= Marie-Christine Boutonnet =

French politician (1949–2026)

Marie-Christine Boutonnet MEP
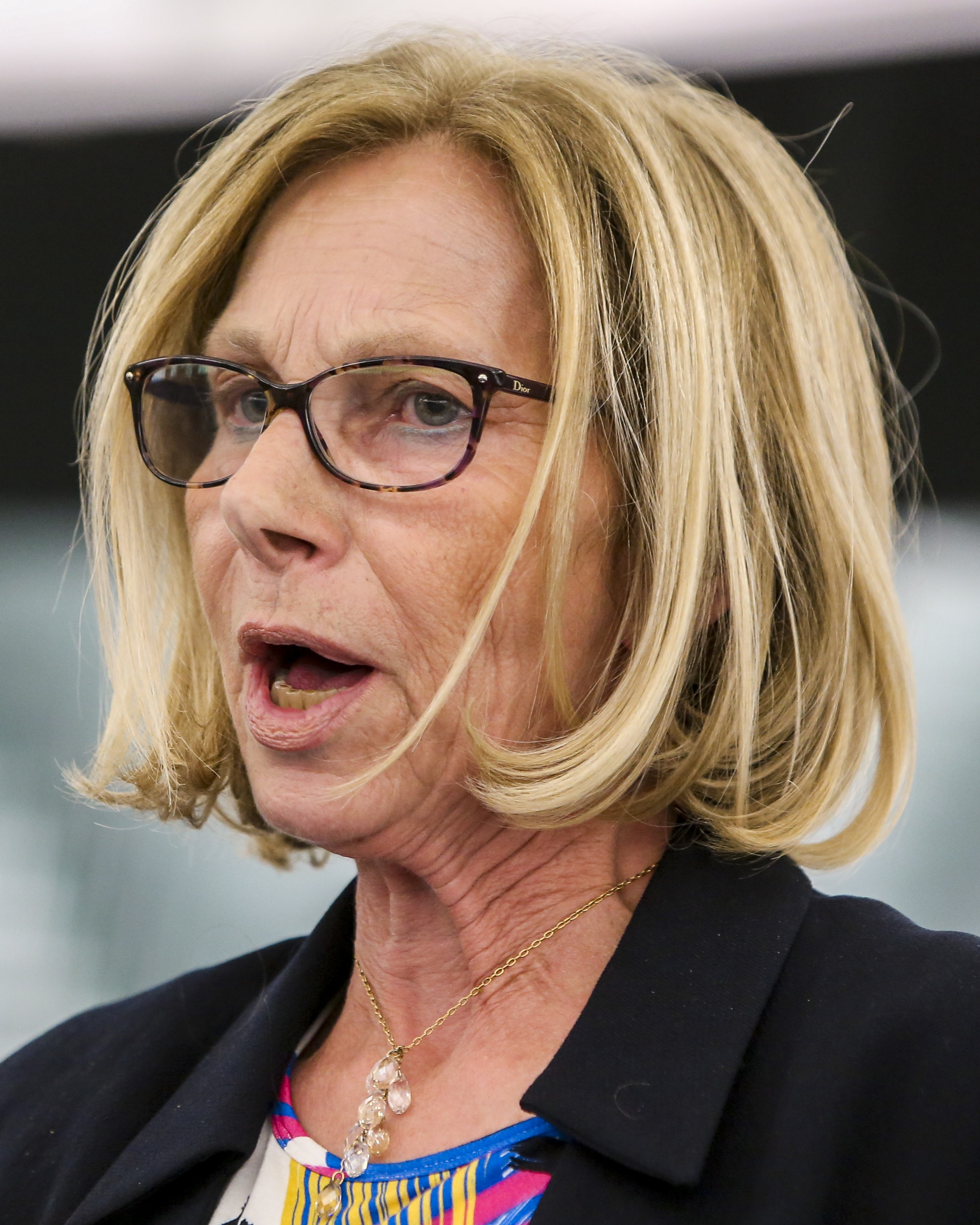
- Boutonnet in 2018

Member of the European Parliament for Île-de-France
- In office 1 July 2014 – 1 July 2019

Personal details
- Born: 10 February 1949 Albi, France
- Died: 7 March 2026 (aged 77)
- Party: National Front

Marie-Christine Boutonnet (10 February 1949 – 7 March 2026) was a French National Front politician who was a Member of the European Parliament, representing Île-de-France. She died on 7 March 2026, at the age of 77.
