= Tarn's 2nd constituency =

Constituency of the National Assembly of France

2nd constituency of Tarn
- inline Constituency of the National Assembly of France

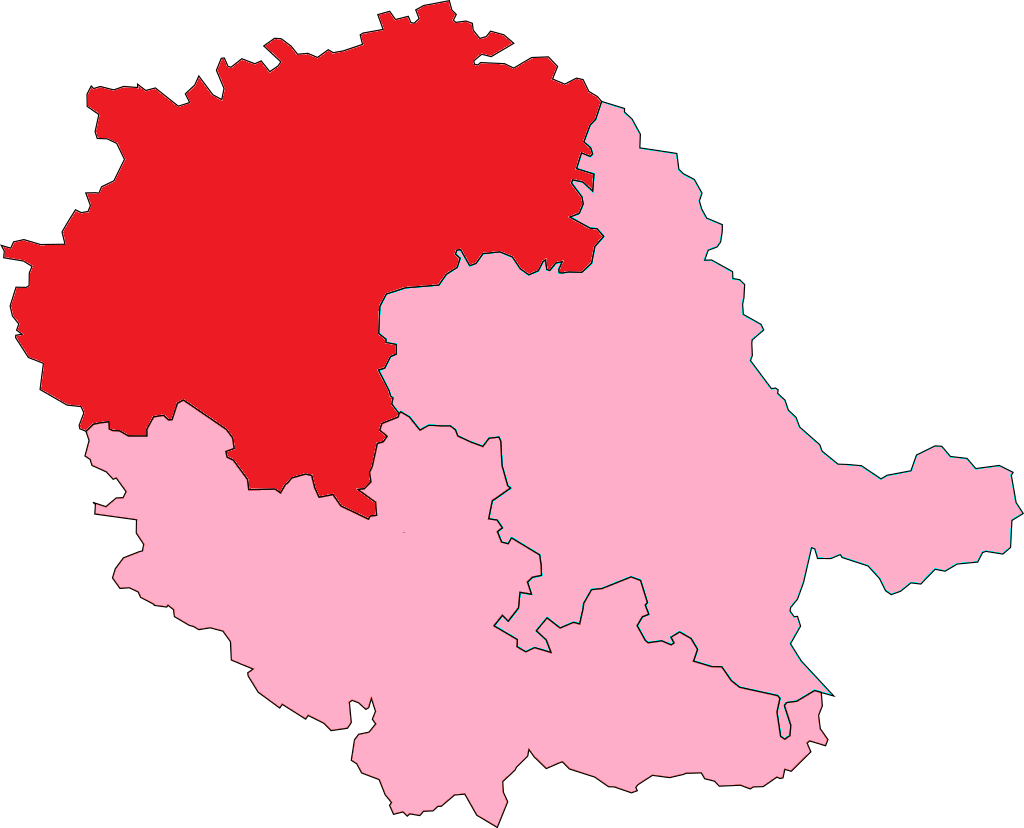
- Tarn's 2nd Constituency shown within the Tarn
- Deputy: Karen Erodi; LFI
- Department: Tarn
- Cantons: Albi Nord-Est, Albi Nord-Ouest, Albi Ouest, Cadalen, Carmaux Nord, Carmaux Sud, Castelnau-de-Montmiral, Cordes-sur-Ciel, Gaillac, Graulhet, Lisle-sur-Tarn, Monestiés, Pampelonne, Rabastens, Salvagnac, Valderiès, Vaour
- Registered voters: 106,014

The 2nd constituency of the Tarn (French: Deuxième circonscription du Tarn) is a French legislative constituency in the Tarn département. Like the other 576 French constituencies, it elects one MP using the two-round system, with a run-off if no candidate receives over 50% of the vote in the first round.

== Description ==
The 2nd constituency of Tarn lies in the north west of the constituency and includes some of Albi, which it shares with Tarn's 1st constituency.

Until 2017 the constituency historically elected PS deputies, with the sole exception of 1993. At the 2017 election the previously dominant PS came a distant 4th in the first round behind En Marche!, the National Front and La France Insoumise.

== Assembly Members ==
Election	Member	Party
1988	Charles Pistre	PS
1993	Paul Quilès	RPR
1997	Thierry Carcenac	PS
2002	Thierry Carcenac	PS
2007	Thierry Carcenac	PS
2012	Jacques Valax	PS
2017	Marie-Christine Verdier-Jouclas	LREM
2022	Karen Erodi	LFI

== Election results ==
=== 2022 ===
Legislative Election 2022: Tarn's 2nd constituency
Party	Candidate	Votes	%	±%
LFI (NUPÉS)	Karen Erodi	17,400	29.91	-5.25
LREM (Ensemble)	Marie-Christine Verdier-Jouclas	16,487	28.34	-5.95
RN	Julien Bacou	13,775	23.68	+6.84
R!	Corinne Darmani	2,399	4.12	N/A
REC	Céline Boyer	2,342	4.03	N/A
DVG	Sandrine Madesclair	2,155	3.70	N/A
DVE	Fabienne Marie Lada	1,182	2.03	N/A
Others	N/A	2,442	4.20	
Turnout		58,182	54.73	+1.99
2nd round result
LFI (NUPÉS)	Karen Erodi	22,633	37.50	N/A
LREM (Ensemble)	Marie-Christine Verdier-Jouclas	21,151	35.05	−31.09
RN	Julien Bacou	16,564	27.45	−6.41
Turnout		50,348	56.75	+15.37
LFI gain from LREM				

=== 2017 ===
Legislative Election 2017: Tarn's 2nd constituency
Party	Candidate	Votes	%	±%
LREM	Marie-Christine Verdier-Jouclas	19,174	34.29	
FN	Doriane Albarao	9,418	16.84	
LFI	Thomas Domenech	8,213	14.69	
PS	Claire Fita	7,260	12.98	
LR	Pascal Grandin	3,996	7.15	
EELV	Pascal Pragnere	2,250	4.02	
PCF	Rachid Touzani	1,943	3.47	
DLF	Pascal Thibaut	1,152	2.06	
Others	N/A	2,512		
Turnout		55,918	52.74	
2nd round result
LREM	Marie-Christine Verdier-Jouclas	29,014	66.14	
FN	Doriane Albarao	14,851	33.86	
Turnout		43,865	41.38	
LREM gain from PS				

=== 2012 ===
Legislative Election 2012: Tarn's 2nd constituency
Party	Candidate	Votes	%	±%
PS	Jacques Valax	29,407	46.47	
FN	Marie-Christine Boutonnet	11,041	17.45	
DVD	Henri Del Rey	10,217	16.15	
FG	André Boudes	5,238	8.28	
EELV	Catherine Manuel	2,453	3.88	
AC	Françoise Rodet	1,928	3.05	
Others	N/A	2,994		
Turnout		63,278	61.78	
2nd round result
PS	Jacques Valax	38,969	66.69	
FN	Marie-Christine Boutonnet	19,461	33.31	
Turnout		58,430	57.05	
PS hold				

=== 2007 ===
Legislative Election 2007: Tarn's 2nd constituency
Party	Candidate	Votes	%	±%
PS	Thierry Carcenac	20,545	39.59	
UMP	Catherine Reveillon	19,176	36.95	
MoDem	Laurence Pujol	3,585	6.91	
FN	Marie-Christine Boutonnet	2,119	4.08	
LV	Pierre Courjault-Rade	1,539	2.97	
PCF	Roxana Farina Concha	1,271	2.45	
Far left	Danièle Wargnies	1,202	2.32	
Others	N/A	2,460		
Turnout		52,931	66.19	
2nd round result
PS	Thierry Carcenac	28,796	54.25	
UMP	Catherine Reveillon	24,283	45.75	
Turnout		54,631	68.31	
PS hold				

=== 2002 ===
Legislative Election 2002: Tarn's 2nd constituency
Party	Candidate	Votes	%	±%
PS	Thierry Carcenac	19,600	38.23	
UMP	Catherine Reveillon	13,058	25.47	
FN	Marie-Christine Boutonnet	5,993	11.69	
UDF	Richard Canac	5,408	10.55	
LV	Jean Gautronneau	1,361	2.65	
PCF	Marie-Claire Culie	1,342	2.62	
CPNT	Jean-Louis Boyer	1,310	2.56	
Others	N/A	3,190		
Turnout		52,648	71.11	
2nd round result
PS	Thierry Carcenac	25,398	52.75	
UMP	Catherine Reveillon	22,749	47.25	
Turnout		50,320	67.98	
PS hold				

=== 1997 ===
Legislative Election 1997: Tarn's 2nd constituency
Party	Candidate	Votes	%	±%
PS	Thierry Carcenac	16,612	33.76	
RPR	Philippe Bonnecarrère	15,825	32.16	
FN	Camille Fabas	7,352	14.94	
PCF	Josian Vayre	3,567	7.25	
LV	Denis Crépin	1,751	3.56	
DVD	Philippe Taurines	1,364	2.77	
Others	N/A	2,731		
Turnout		52,263	73.85	
2nd round result
PS	Thierry Carcenac	27,389	52.25	
RPR	Philippe Bonnecarrère	25,029	47.75	
Turnout		55,895	79.00	
PS gain from RPR				
