= Guilhem Carayon =

French politician (born 1999)

Leader of Les Jeunes Républicains
- In office 12 April 2021 – 24 September 2024
- Preceded by: Aurane Reihanian

Personal details
- Born: 26 May 1999 (age 26)
- Party: Union of the Right for the Republic (since 2024)
- Other political affiliations: The Republicans (until 2024)
- Parent: Bernard Carayon (father)

Guilhem Carayon (born 26 May 1999) is a French politician serving as vice president of the Union of the Right for the Republic (UDR) since 2024. He was a member of The Republicans until 2024, and served as leader of its youth wing Les Jeunes Républicains and as spokesperson and vice president of the party until switching to the UDR. He was a candidate for Tarn's 3rd constituency in the 2022 and 2024 legislative elections, and a candidate for member of the European Parliament in 2024. He is the son of Bernard Carayon.
