= Jean Terlier =

French politician

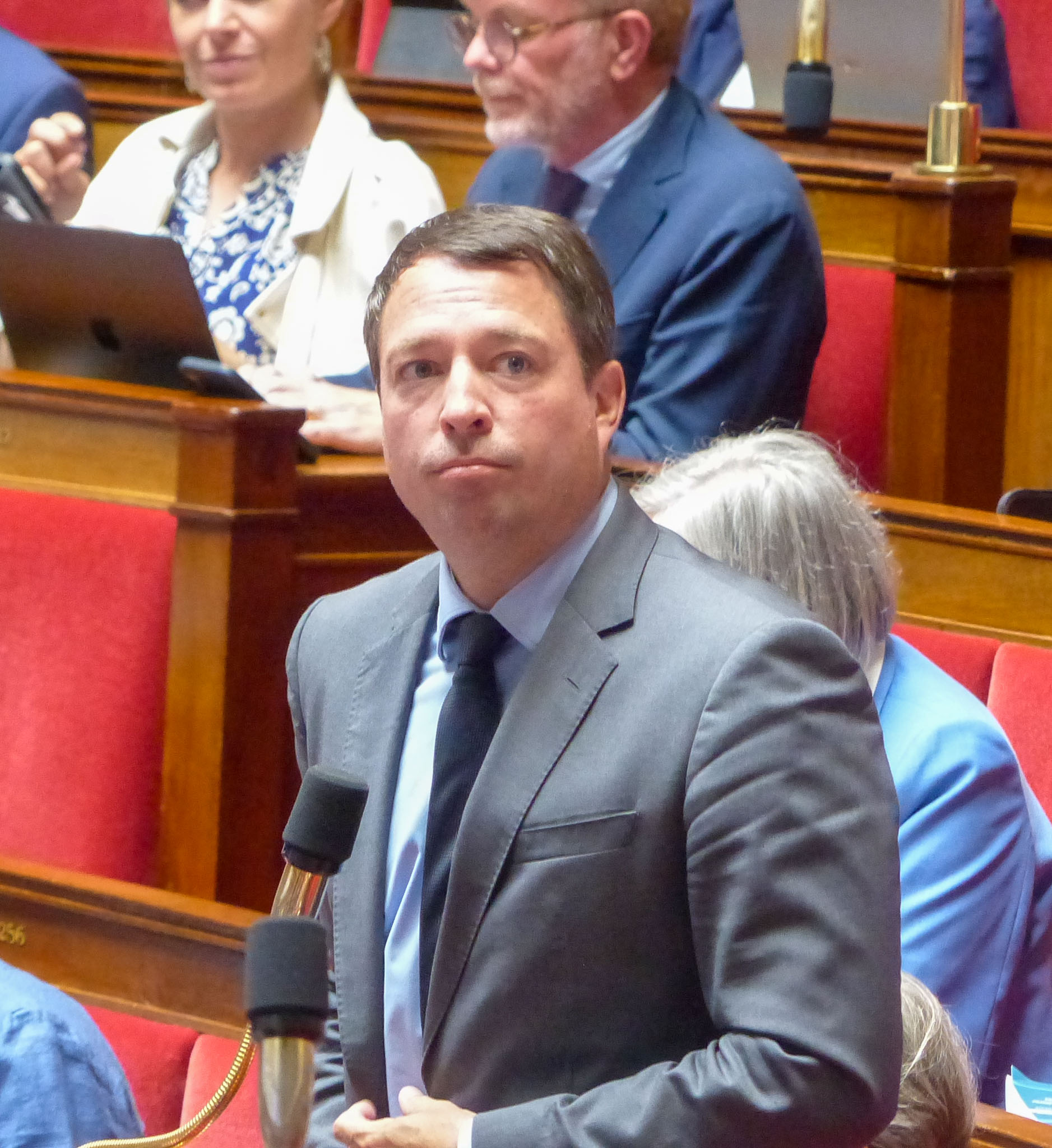
Jean Terlier in 2026.

Jean Terlier (born 2 March 1977 in Toulon) is a French politician of La République En Marche! (LREM) who has been serving as a member of the French National Assembly since the 2017 elections, representing Tarn's 3rd constituency. He is also one of his parliamentary group's spokespeople.

== Political career ==
In parliament, Terlier serves on the Committee on Legal Affairs. In this capacity, he is the parliament's rapporteur on a 2021 reform of France's juvenile criminal justice. In addition to his committee assignments, he chairs the French-Gabonese Parliamentary Friendship Group.

In July 2019, Terlier voted in favour of the French ratification of the European Union’s Comprehensive Economic and Trade Agreement (CETA) with Canada.

He was re-elected in the 2022 French legislative election.

== See also ==
- 2017 French legislative election
