= Karen Erodi =

French politician (born 1977)

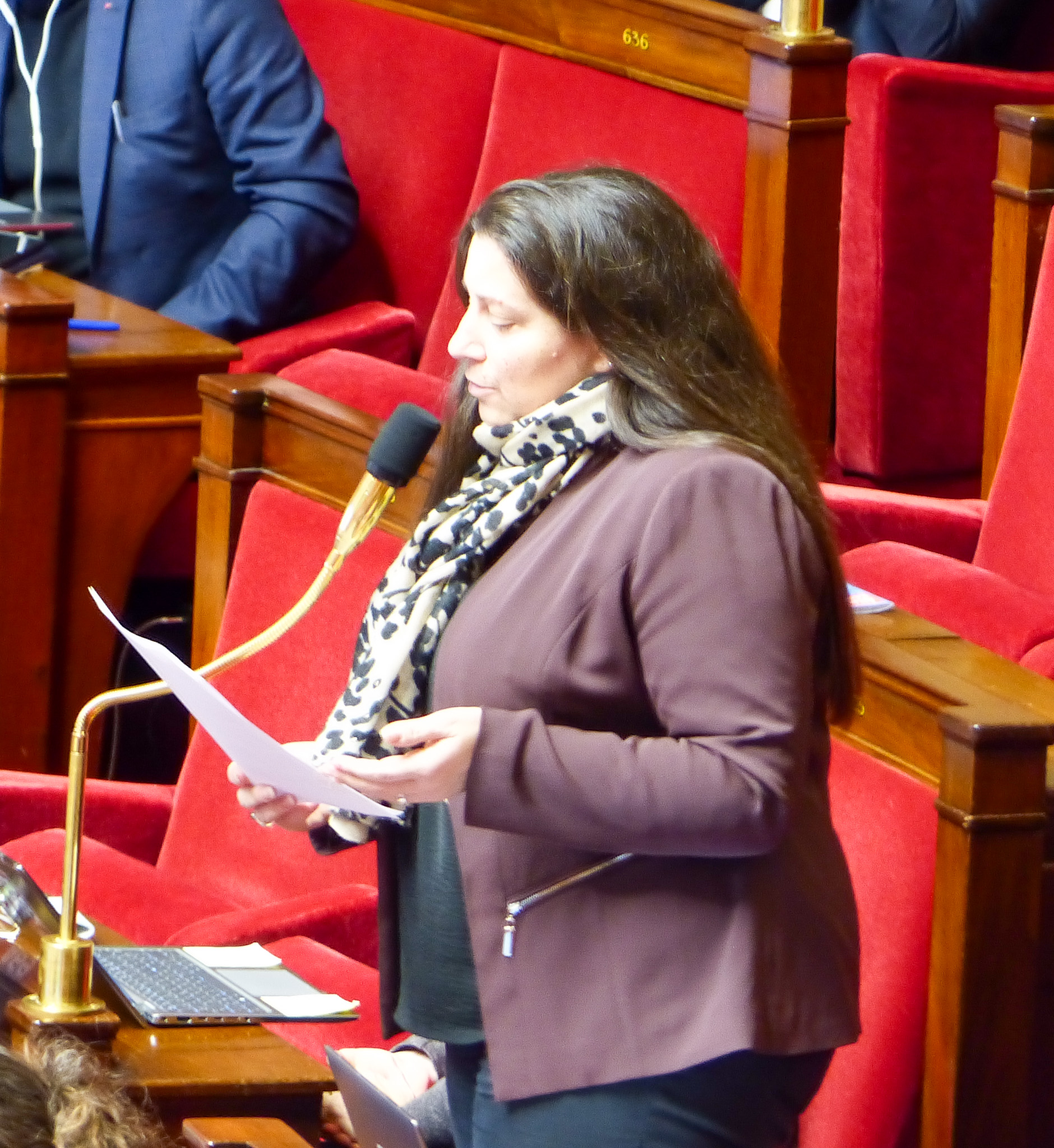

Member of the National Assembly for Tarn's 2nd constituency
- Incumbent
- Assumed office 21 June 2022
- Preceded by: Marie-Christine Verdier-Jouclas

Personal details
- Born: 4 February 1977 (age 49) Toulouse, France
- Party: La France Insoumise
- Other political affiliations: NUPES

Karen Erodi (born 4 February 1977 in Toulouse) is a French politician from La France Insoumise (NUPES). She has been member of the National Assembly for Tarn's 2nd constituency since 2022.

== See also ==
- List of deputies of the 16th National Assembly of France
