= Jean-Pierre Casimir de Marcassus, Baron de Puymaurin =

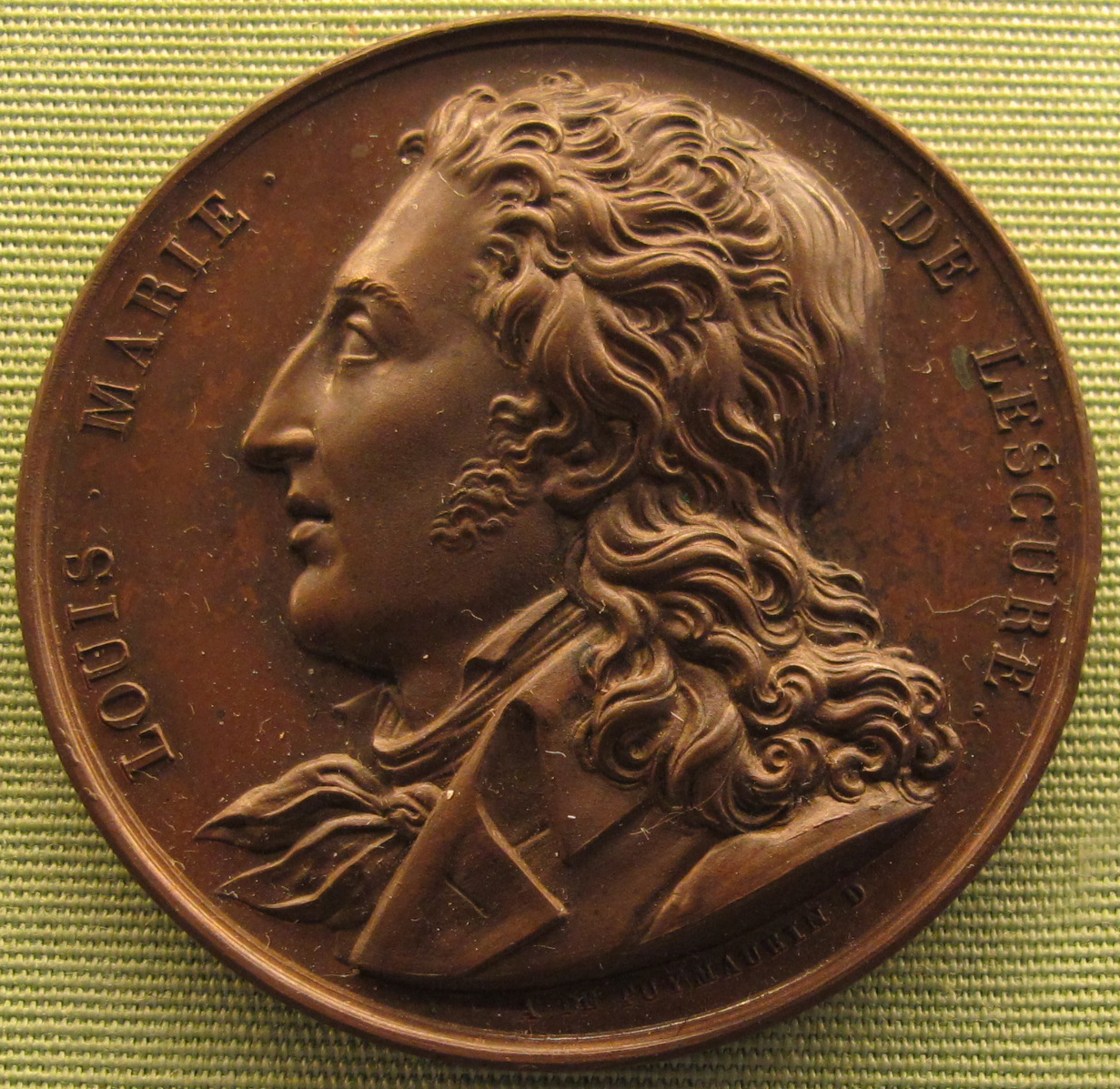
medallion depicting Louis Marie de Lescure by Jean-Pierre Casimir de Marcassus, 1824

Jean-Pierre Marcassus de Puymaurin (5 December 1757 – 14 February 1841), also Jean-Pierre-Casimir de Marcassus, Baron de Puymaurin, was a French chemist, medallist, politician, and man of letters.

Casimir de Marcassus was born in Toulouse to a distinguished family. His grandfather and father both served as governing magistrates for the Capitole de Toulouse. His father was also a patron of the arts and avid art collector. He married Marie-Antoinette Good, and lived and worked in Toulouse his entire life.

Casimir de Marcassus was a chemist who introduced into France glass etching by hydrofluoric acid. Following in his father's footsteps he became councilor of Toulouse and general counsel of the Haute-Garonne. In 1805 he was elected to the legislature, and was re-elected in 1811. When the legislature was interrupted by the return of Napoleon in between wars, Casimir returned home until after the Hundred Days. He then continued to be re-elected from 1815 through 1830. He was appointed on 1 May 1816 to become the Director of the Royal Mint of Medals. Many of his works are collected at Academy of Toulouse. He died on 14 February 1841 in his hometown.
