= Philippe Folliot =

French politician

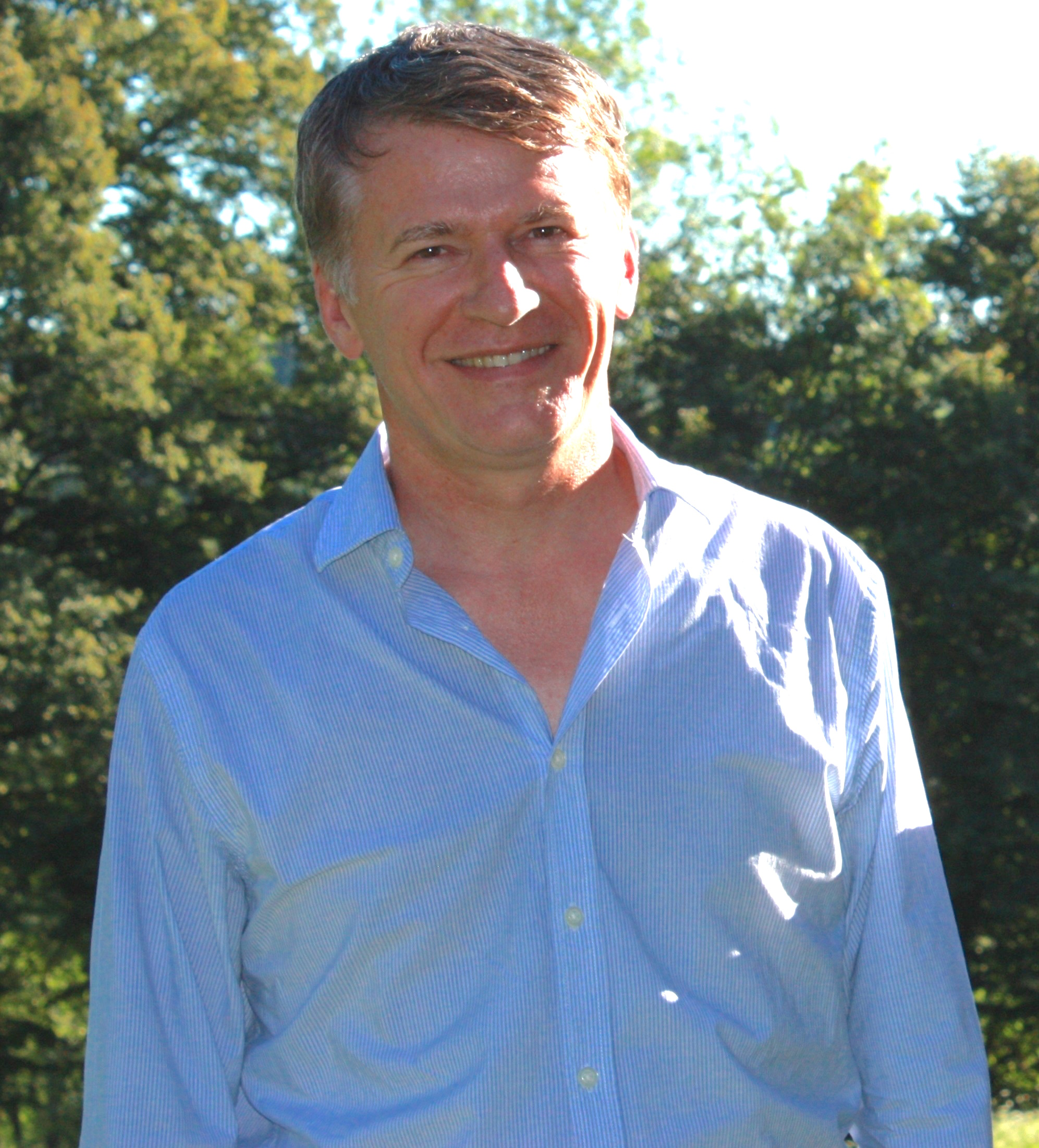
- Philippe Folliot in 2016

Member of the French Senate for Tarn
- Incumbent
- Assumed office 1 October 2020

Member of the National Assembly for Tarn's 1st constituency
- In office 19 June 2002 – 30 September 2020
- Preceded by: Jacques Valax
- Succeeded by: Muriel Roques-Étienne

Personal details
- Born: 14 July 1963 (age 63) Albi, France
- Party: Centrist Union
- Education: Institut d'études politiques de Toulouse; Toulouse 1 University Capitole

Philippe Folliot (French: [filip fɔljo]; born 14 July 1963 in Albi, Tarn) is a French politician who serves as a member of the National Assembly of France, representing the Tarn department. He is the founder of the Centrist Alliance.

== Political career ==
Ahead of the 2012 presidential election, Folliot endorsed François Bayrou's candidacy as President of France. In 2013, Jean-Louis Borloo of the Union of Democrats and Independents (UDI) included Folliot in his shadow cabinet; in this capacity, he served as opposition counterpart to Minister of Defense Jean-Yves Le Drian.

In the 2017 legislative election, Folliot claimed the banner of the presidential majority without being explicitly invested by La République En Marche!. Following the election, he stood as a candidate for the National Assembly's presidency; in an internal vote within the LREM parliamentary group, he lost against François de Rugy. He came in last with the support of 32 deputies.

In parliament, Folliot serves on the Defence Committee. In addition to his committee assignments, he chairs the French-Egyptian Parliamentary Friendship Group.

== Political positions ==
In July 2019, Folliot voted in favor of the French ratification of the European Union’s Comprehensive Economic and Trade Agreement (CETA) with Canada.
