= Bernard Carayon =

French politician (born 1957)

Mayor of Lavaur
- Incumbent
- Assumed office 19 June 1995

Member of the French National Assembly for Tarn
- In office 1993–2012

Personal details
- Born: 1 October 1957 (age 68) Paris, France
- Party: The Republicans
- Children: Guilhem Carayon
- Education: Panthéon-Assas University

Bernard Carayon (French pronunciation: [bɛʁnaʁ kaʁajɔ̃]; born 1 October 1957, in Paris) was a member of the French parliament. First elected in Tarn in 1993; he has been then reelected in 2002 and 2007. He is also mayor of Lavaur, a historic city near Toulouse, since 1995. He is a member of the Union for a Popular Movement. Since 2009, he has been a lecturer at SciencesPo Paris in the department of public affairs. With a focus on the questions of globalization, he has written two books entitled "Patriotisme économique" and "Changeons le monde" ("Let's change the world"). Together with a socialist MP he started a foundation called "Prometheus". Supported by a dozen prominent French companies, Prometheus tries to bridge the gap between the private and the public reflexions about globalization in order to build a genuine economic strategy for France and Europe.
