= 1993 French legislative election =

- 21 and 28 March 1993

All 577 seats to the French National Assembly 289 seats were needed for a majority
- Turnout: 68.93% (▲3.2 pp) (1st round); 67.51% (▼1.4pp) (2nd round)
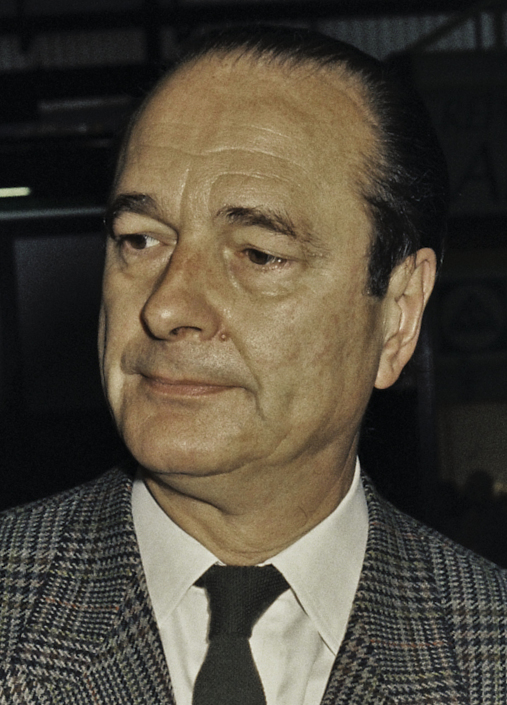

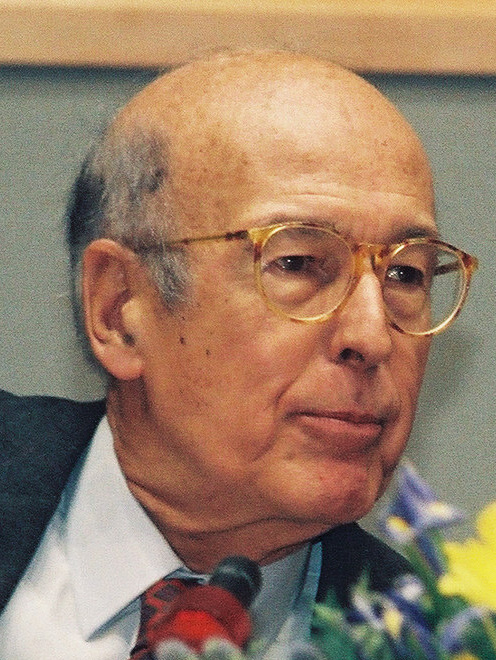

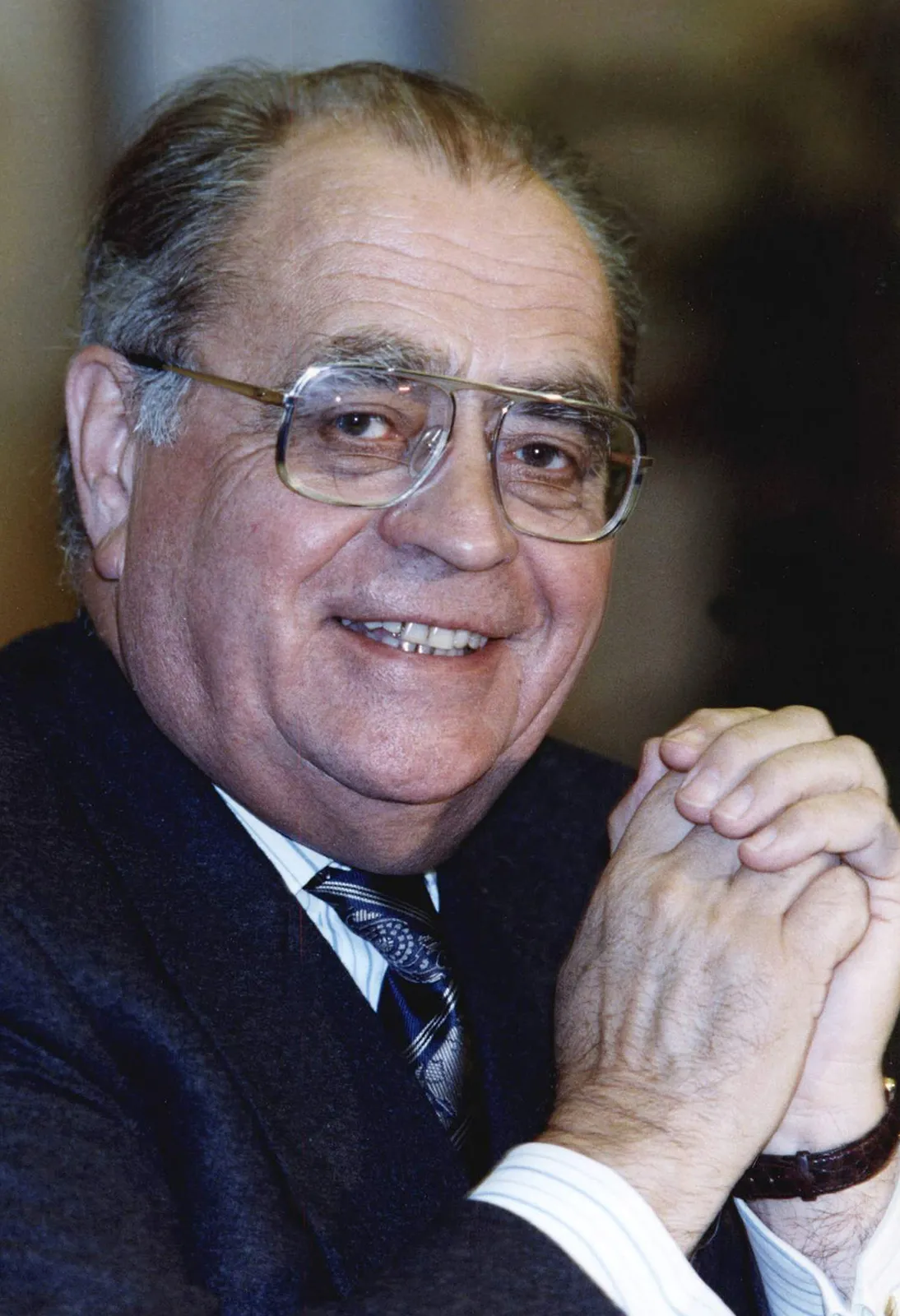

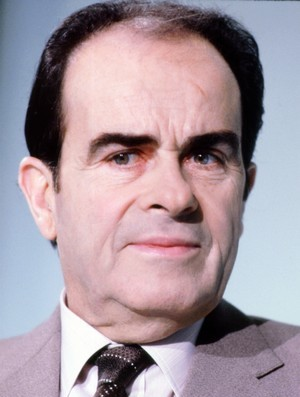

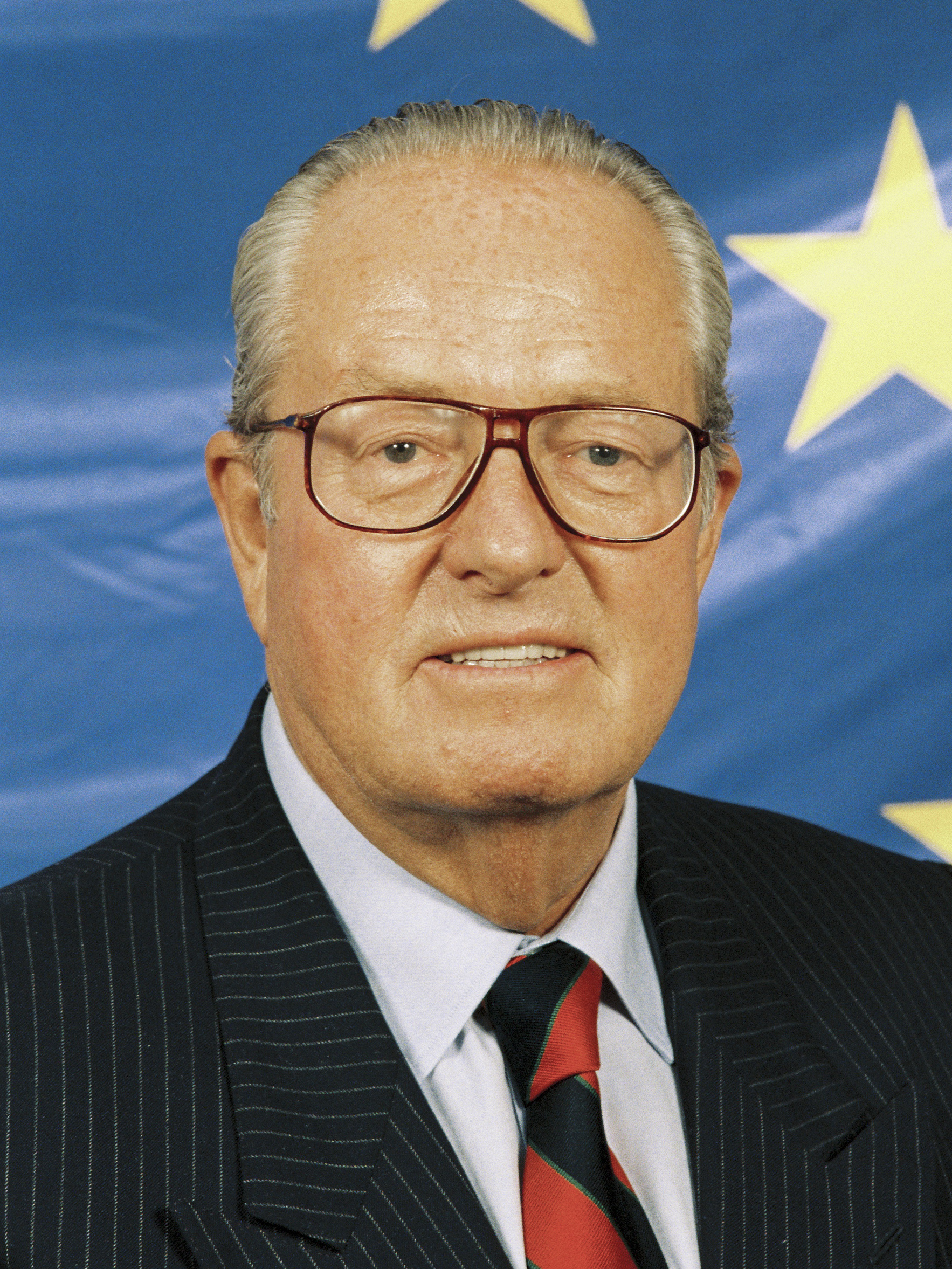
	First party	Second party	Third party
Leader	Jacques Chirac	Valéry Giscard d'Estaing	Pierre Bérégovoy
Party	RPR	UDF	PS
Leader's seat	Corrèze-3rd	Puy-de-Dôme-3rd	Nièvre 1st
Last election	126 seats, 19.2%	129 seats, 18.5%	260 seats, 34.8%
Seats won	247	213	53
Seat change	▲119	▲83	▼209
Popular vote	5,188,196 (1st round); 5,832,987 (2nd round)	4,855,274(1st round); 5,331,935 (2nd round)	4,476,716 (1st round); 5,829,493 (2nd round)
Percentage	20.39% (1st round); 28.27% (2nd round)	19.08% (1st round); 25.84% (2nd round)	17.60% (1st round); 28.25% (2nd round)
	Fourth party	Fifth party
Leader	Georges Marchais	Jean-Marie Le Pen
Party	PCF	FN
Leader's seat	none
Last election	27 seats, 11.3%	1 seat, 9.7%
Seats won	24	0
Seat change	▼3	▼1
Popular vote	2,336,254 (1st round); 951,213 (2nd round)	3,159,477 (1st round); 1,168,150 (2nd round)
Percentage	9.18% (1st round); 4.61% (2nd round)	12.42% (1st round); 5.66% (2nd round)
Prime Minister before election
Pierre Bérégovoy
PS
Elected Prime Minister
Edouard Balladur
RPR

Legislative elections were held in France on 21 and 28 March 1993, to elect the tenth National Assembly of the Fifth Republic.

Since 1988, President François Mitterrand and his Socialist cabinets had relied on a relative parliamentary majority. In an attempt to avoid having to work with the Communists, Prime Minister Michel Rocard tried to gain support from the UDF by appointing four UDF ministers. After the UDF withdrew its support for the government in 1991, Rocard and the UDF ministers resigned. The UDF then became allied with the Gaullist Rally for the Republic (RPR).

The Socialist Party (PS) was further weakened by scandals (involving illicit financing, contaminated blood and other affairs) and an intense rivalry between François Mitterrand's potential successors Lionel Jospin and Laurent Fabius. In March 1992 the Socialists were punished at the regional and cantonal elections and the following month Prime Minister Édith Cresson was replaced by Pierre Bérégovoy. The latter promised to fight against economic recession and corruption, but he was himself suspected to have received a loan from a controversial businessman, Roger-Patrice Pelat.

The election was a landslide victory for the RPR–UDF alliance, while the PS and their left-wing allies received their worst result since the 1960s. The PS lost nearly 80% of the seats they had held at the time of the chamber's dissolution. This caused a crisis within the PS; Fabius lost his position as First Secretary in favour of Rocard, who claimed that a political "big bang" was needed. Jospin announced his political retirement after he was defeated in his Haute-Garonne constituency. Depressed by the defeat and the accusations about the loan from Pelat, Bérégovoy committed suicide on 1 May.

Some traditional PS voters voted for the Greens in the first round. These ecologists obtained a total of 11%, making this the best total score for green parties in legislative elections. However, only two ecologists qualified for the runoff, including Dominique Voynet in her constituency in the Doubs département. Both of these candidates were eventually defeated. Lack of major political allies for these ecologists explained this failure to take any seats.

The RPR–UDF coalition (together with supportive right-wing parties) formed the largest parliamentary majority since 1958, taking a total of 484 of the 577 seats. The RPR leader Jacques Chirac demanded President Mitterrand's resignation and refused to be Prime Minister in a new "cohabitation" government. Finally, he suggested the nomination of his former RPR Finance Minister Edouard Balladur at the head of the government. Balladur promised publicly that he would not run against Chirac for the next presidential election. The second "cohabitation" finished with the 1995 presidential election.

== Results ==
Party	First round			Second round			Total seats
Party	Votes	%	Seats	Votes	%	Seats	Total seats
Rally for the Republic	5,188,196	20.39	42	5,832,987	28.27	205	247
Union for French Democracy	4,855,274	19.08	36	5,331,935	25.84	177	213
Socialist Party	4,476,716	17.60	0	5,829,493	28.25	54	54
National Front	3,159,477	12.42	0	1,168,150	5.66	0	0
French Communist Party	2,336,254	9.18	0	951,213	4.61	23	23
Miscellaneous right	1,199,887	4.72	2	736,372	3.57	22	24
The Greens	1,022,749	4.02	0	20,088	0.10	0	0
Miscellaneous	957,711	3.76	0				0
Ecology Generation	921,925	3.62	0	17,403	0.08	0	0
Miscellaneous left	457,193	1.80	0	448,187	2.17	10	10
Far-left	451,804	1.78	0	22,509	0.11	0	0
Movement of Radicals of the Left	228,758	0.90	0	237,622	1.15	6	6
Regionalists	116,474	0.46	0	36,971	0.18	0	0
Far-right	69,985	0.28	0				0
Total	25,442,403	100.00	80	20,632,930	100.00	497	577
Valid votes	25,442,403	94.72		20,632,930	90.49		
Invalid/blank votes	1,417,774	5.28		2,169,371	9.51		
Total votes	26,860,177	100.00		22,802,301	100.00		
Registered voters/turnout	38,968,660	68.93		33,773,804	67.51		
Source: IPU, National Assembly

=== Parliamentary groups in the National Assembly ===
Party	Seats		
Party	Members	Caucusing	total
RPR Group	245	12	257
UDF Group	213	2	215
Socialist Group	52	5	57
Republic and Liberty Group	23	0	23
Communist Group	22	1	23
Non-Inscrits	2	0	2
Total	557	20	577
Source: IPU

== See also ==
- List of deputies of the 10th National Assembly of France
