= Frédéric Cabrolier =

French politician (born 1966)

Frédéric Cabrolier (born 12 October 1966 in Bourges) is a French politician from the National Rally.

He is a FN regional councillor in Midi-Pyrénées. In 2009, he was selected to be National Front's candidate in Midi-Pyrénées for the 2010 regional elections.

He was elected Member of Parliament for Tarn's 1st constituency in the 2022 French legislative election, defeating Gérard Poujade of LFI in the second round; incumbent MP Muriel Roques-Étienne (LREM) was eliminated in the first round.
