= Jacques Limouzy =

French politician (1926–2021)

Jacques Limouzy (29 August 1926 – 7 November 2021) was a French politician.

Limouzy was first elected to the National Assembly in 1967, to replace Antonin Tirefort, who did not run for reelection. Limouzy lost the 1969 legislative elections, but returned to office in 1973, and later served as deputy from 1975 to 1981 and between 1986 and 2002.
