= Albina =

Albina may refer to:

== Places ==
- Albina, Suriname, a city in Suriname
- Albina, Oregon, a city annexed by Portland, Oregon, US
- Albina, Brăila, a village in Tichilești Commune, Brăila County, Romania
- Albina, Timiș, a village in Moșnița Nouă Commune, Timiș County, Romania
- Albina, Vaslui, a village in Ivănești Commune, Vaslui County, Romania
- Albina, Cimişlia, a commune in Raionul Cimişlia, Moldova
- Lake Albina, a lake in the Snowy Mountains in New South Wales, Australia

== People etc. ==
- Albina (given name), people with the name "Albina"
- Albina (mythology), legendary ancestor of the giants of Albion
- Saint Albina

== Other uses ==
- Albina (play), a 1779 tragedy by the British writer Hannah Crowley
- One of the Russian space dogs
- Albina Românească, Romanian-language bi-weekly political and literary magazine, printed in Iaşi, Moldavia
- Appias albina, butterfly found in India

== See also ==
- Albino (disambiguation)
- Albine
