= Albino (disambiguation) =

Albino may refer to:

- Albino, an organism with the disorder albinism, the congenital lack of normal pigmentation
- Albino, a person with albinism; albino in this sense is increasingly regarded as derogatory

== People ==
- Albino (name)

== Places ==
- Albino, Lombardy, a comune in the province of Bergamo, Italy
- Albino Rock, an island in Queensland, Australia

== Other uses ==
- Albino (chess), a problem in the game of chess
- Albino (comics), a Marvel Comics supervillain
- Albino (film), a 1976 thriller film distributed by Troma Entertainment
- Albino, Spanish colonial term for an octoroon, a person of 1/8 African and 7/8 European ancestry

== See also ==
- Albina
- Albine
- Albanianism
