= Saint-Amans =

Saint-Amans may refer to the following communes in France:

- Saint-Amans, Ariège, a former commune in the Ariège département
- Saint-Amans, Aude, in the Aude département
- Saint-Amans, Lozère, in the Lozère département
- Saint-Amans-de-Pellagal, in the Tarn-et-Garonne département
- Saint-Amans-des-Cots, in the Aveyron département
- Saint-Amans-du-Pech, in the Tarn-et-Garonne département
- Saint-Amans-Soult, in the Tarn département
- Saint-Amans-Valtoret, in the Tarn département

== See also ==
- St.-Amans, taxonomic author abbreviation of Jean Florimond Boudon de Saint-Amans (1748–1831), French naturalist
- Saint-Amand (disambiguation)
- Saint-Amant (disambiguation)
- Saint Amand
