= Saint-Amand =

Saint-Amand may refer to:

== People ==
- Saint-Amand (writer) (1797–1885), French playwright
- Aline Saint-Amand (born 1936), Canadian politician
- Alphée Saint-Amand (1903–1983), Canadian politician and businessman
- Edris Saint-Amand (1918–2004), Haitian novelist
- James St. Amand (1687–1754), English classical scholar and book collector.
- Lloyd St. Amand (born 1952), Canadian politician
- Danielle St-Amand (born 1964), politician in the Canadian province of Quebec
- Mario Saint-Amand (born 1968), Canadian singer and actor
- Pierre St-Amand, retired Royal Canadian Air Force Lieutenant-General

== Places ==
=== Belgium ===
- Saint-Amand, Fleurus, a village in Hainaut
- Sint-Amands, a former municipality in the province of Antwerp

=== France ===
- Saint-Amand, Creuse
- Saint-Amand, Manche
- Saint-Amand, Pas-de-Calais
- Saint-Amand-de-Belvès, in the Dordogne department
- Saint-Amand-de-Coly, in the Dordogne department
- Saint-Amand-des-Hautes-Terres, in the Eure department
- Saint-Amand-de-Vergt, in the Dordogne department
- Saint-Amand-en-Puisaye, in the Nièvre department
- Saint-Amand-Jartoudeix, in the Creuse department
- Saint-Amand-le-Petit, in the Haute-Vienne department
- Saint-Amand-les-Eaux, in the Nord department
- Saint-Amand-Longpré, in the Loir-et-Cher department
- Saint-Amand-Magnazeix, in the Haute-Vienne department
- Saint-Amand-Montrond, in the Cher department
- Saint-Amand-sur-Fion, in the Marne department
- Saint-Amand-sur-Ornain, in the Meuse department
- Saint-Amand-sur-Sèvre, in the Deux-Sèvres department

== Other uses ==
- Saint-Amand Abbey, Saint-Amand-les-Eaux, Nord, France
- Saint-Amand Handball, he name of a French handball club from Saint-Amand-les-Eaux, France

== See also ==
- Saint Amand, 7th-century saint
- Saint-Amant (disambiguation)
- Saint-Amans (disambiguation)
