= Amant =

Amant may refer to:

- Les Amants (The Lovers), a 1958 French film
- Les Amants, a 1927–1928 painting by René Magritte
- Amant, a disco music studio group formed by Ray Martínez in 1978

== See also ==
- Saint-Amant (disambiguation), the name of several people and towns
