= Juxon =

Juxon is a surname. Notable people with the surname include:

- William Juxon (1582–1663), English churchman
- Juxon Baronets

== See also ==
- Juxon Street, Oxford, England
