= Gogmagog (giant) =

Giant in Welsh and English mythology

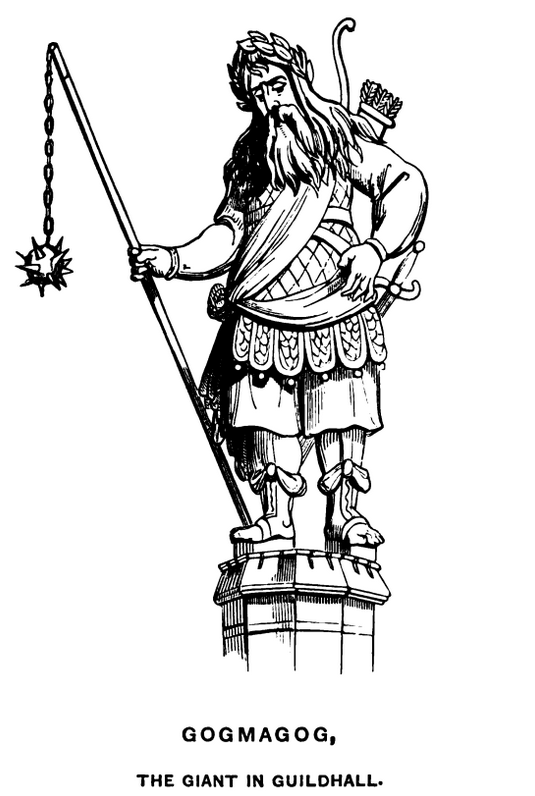
Gogmagog. This and Corineus were a pair of figures displayed at Guildhall, London, carved by Captain Richard Saunders in 1709.

Gogmagog (also Goemagot, Goemagog, Goëmagot and Gogmagoc) was a legendary giant in the Matter of Britain. According to Geoffrey of Monmouth's Historia Regum Britanniae ("The History of The Kings of Britain", 12th century), he was a giant inhabitant of Cornwall who was thrown off a cliff during a wrestling match with Corineus (the legendary namesake of Cornwall and companion of Brutus of Troy). Later tradition expanded on this story, with Gogmagog described as a descendant of Albina, and the chieftain and largest of the giants found by Brutus and his men inhabiting the land of Albion. The effigies of Gogmagog and Corineus, used in English pageantry and later instituted as guardian statues at Guildhall in London, eventually earned the familiar names "Gog and Magog".

== Etymology ==
The name Gogmagog is commonly considered to be derived from the biblical characters Gog and Magog; however, Peter Roberts, author of an 1811 English translation of the Welsh chronicle Brut Tysilio (itself a translation of Geoffrey of Monmouth's Historia Regum Britanniae), argued that it was a corruption of Cawr-Madog ('the giant or great warrior Madog'), supported by Ponticus Virunnius' spelling of the name as Goermagog.

== Geoffrey of Monmouth ==
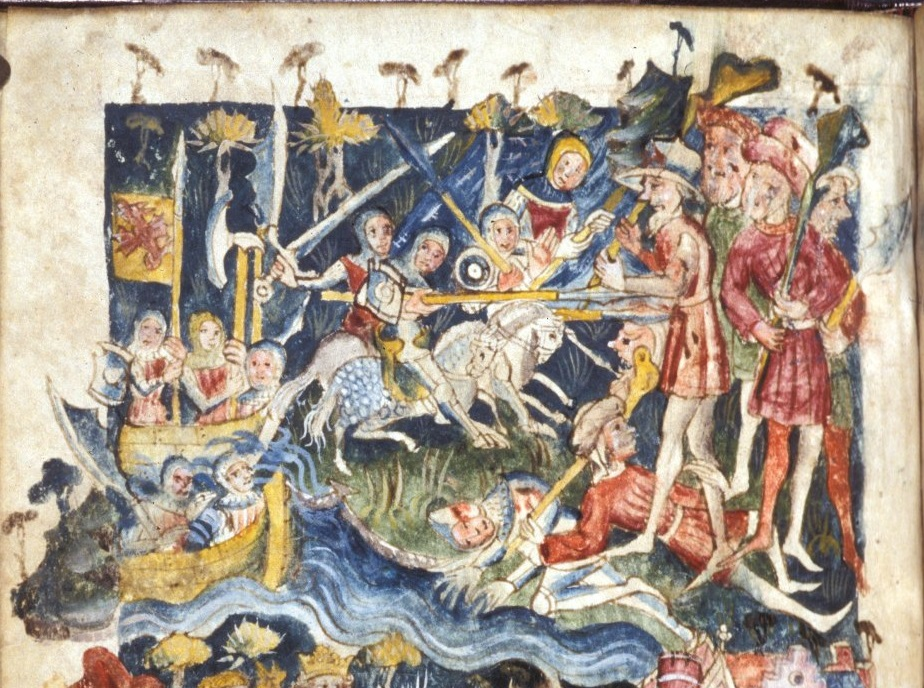
Combat between Brutus's troops and the giants led by Gogmagog —abridged Historia Regnum Britannae; British Library MS Harley 1808, fol. 8

Gogmagog ("Goemagot", "Goemagog") appears in the legend of the founding of Britain as written by Geoffrey of Monmouth in Historia Regum Britanniae (1136). The island of Albion was once inhabited by giants, but their numbers had dwindled and few remained. Gogmagog was one of these last giants, and was slain by Corineus, a member of the invading Trojan colonisers headed by Brutus. Corineus was subsequently granted a piece of land that was named "Cornwall" after him.

The Historia details the encounter as follows: Gogmagog, accompanied by twenty fellow giants, attacked the Trojan settlement and caused great slaughter. The Trojans rallied back and killed all giants, except for "one detestable monster named Gogmagog, in stature twelve cubits, and of such prodigious strength that at one shake he pulled up an oak as if it had been a hazel wand". He is captured so that Corineus can wrestle with him. The giant breaks three of Corineus's ribs, which so enrages him that he picks up the giant and carries him on his shoulders to the top of a high rock, from which he throws the giant down into the sea. The place where he fell was known as "Gogmagog's Leap" to posterity.

Archbishop Michael Joseph Curley suggests that Geoffrey of Monmouth may have been inspired by the giant Antaeus in Lucan's Pharsalia, who was defeated by Hercules in a wrestling match by lifting him from the earth, the source of his strength; both giants lived in caves and gave their names to a place.

== Later versions ==
Gogmagog's combat with Corineus according to Geoffrey was repeated in Wace's Anglo-Norman Brut and Layamon's Middle-English Brut. Because Geoffrey's work was regarded as fact until the late 17th century, the story continued to appear in most early histories of Britain. Some expanded on the Historia, such as John of Hauville's Architrenius (c. 1184), which describes how "the towering height of Gemagog's twelve cubits, rushing upon them, was enough to terrify the Trojans, until he was overthrown by the strong limbs of Corineus" and goes on to say that before the time of Brutus:

[Britain] provided a home only for a few Titans, whose garments came from the damp bodies of wild beasts, who drank blood from goblets of wood, who made their homes in caves, their beds out of brush, their tables from rocks. Hunting gave them food, rape served for love, slaughter was their entertainment. Brute strength was their law, madness their courage, impulsive violence their warfare. Battle was their death, and thickets were their tombs. The whole land complained of these mountain-dwelling monsters, but they were for the most part the terror of the western region, and their mad ravages most afflicted you, Cornwall, uttermost threshold of the west wind. It was the might of Corineus, ever ready for battle, that drove these creatures headlong into Avernos. In a Herculean struggle he lifted Gemagog, twelve cubits tall, on high, then cast his Antaean enemy from a rock into the sea. Drunken Thetis drank the stream of blood he gave forth. The sea scattered his limbs; Cerberus received his shade.

The tale of Gogmagog's ancestry was composed later in the 14th century. Known as the "Albina story" (or Des Grantz Geanz), it claimed Gogmagog to be a giant descended from Albina and her sisters, thirty daughters of the king of Greece exiled to the land later to be known as "Albion". This story was added as a prologue to later versions of Brut pseudo-history.

Thus according to the Middle English prose version of the Brut, known as the Chronicles of England, Albina was the daughter of Syrian king named Diodicias, from whom Gogmagog and Laugherigan and the other giants of Albion are descended. These giants lived in caves and hills until being conquered by Brutus' party arriving in "Tottenesse" (Totnes, Devon). A later chapter describes Gogmagog's combat with Corineus (Middle English: Coryn) "at Totttenes", more or less as according to Geoffrey. Gogmagog was the tallest of these giants; Coryn in comparison was at least the largest man from the waist upward among Brutus's crew. Caxton's printed edition, The Cronycles of Englond (1482), closely matches this content.

Raphael Holinshed also localises the event of the "leape of Gogmagog" at Dover, but William Camden in his 1586 work Brittannia locates it on Plymouth Hoe, perhaps following Richard Carew's Survey of Cornwall. Carew describes "the portraiture of two men, one bigger, the other lesser.. (whom they term "Gogmagog") which was cut upon the ground at the Hawe (i.e. The Hoe) in Plymouth...". These figures were first recorded in 1495 and were destroyed by the construction of the Royal Citadel in 1665.

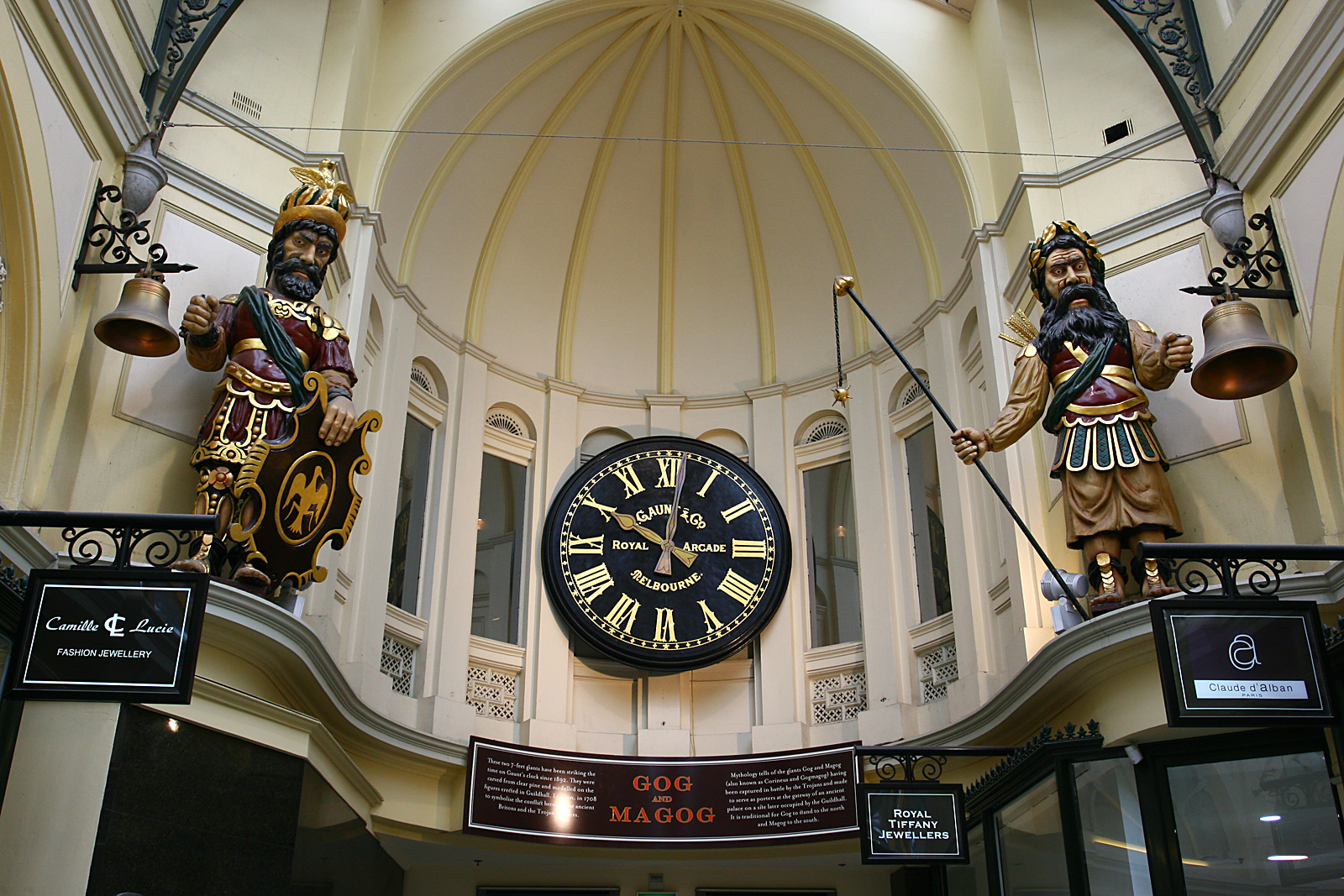
Gog and Magog figures located in the Royal Arcade, Melbourne (Australia)

Michael Drayton's Poly-Olbion preserves the tale as well:

Amongst the ragged Cleeves those monstrous giants sought:
Who (of their dreadful kind) t'appal the Trojans brought
Great Gogmagog, an oake that by the roots could teare;
So mighty were (that time) the men who lived there:
But, for the use of armes he did not understand
(Except some rock or tree, that coming next to land,
He raised out of the earth to execute his rage),
He challenge makes for strength, and offereth there his gage,
Which Corin taketh up, to answer by and by,
Upon this sonne of earth his utmost power to try.

== Guardians of London ==
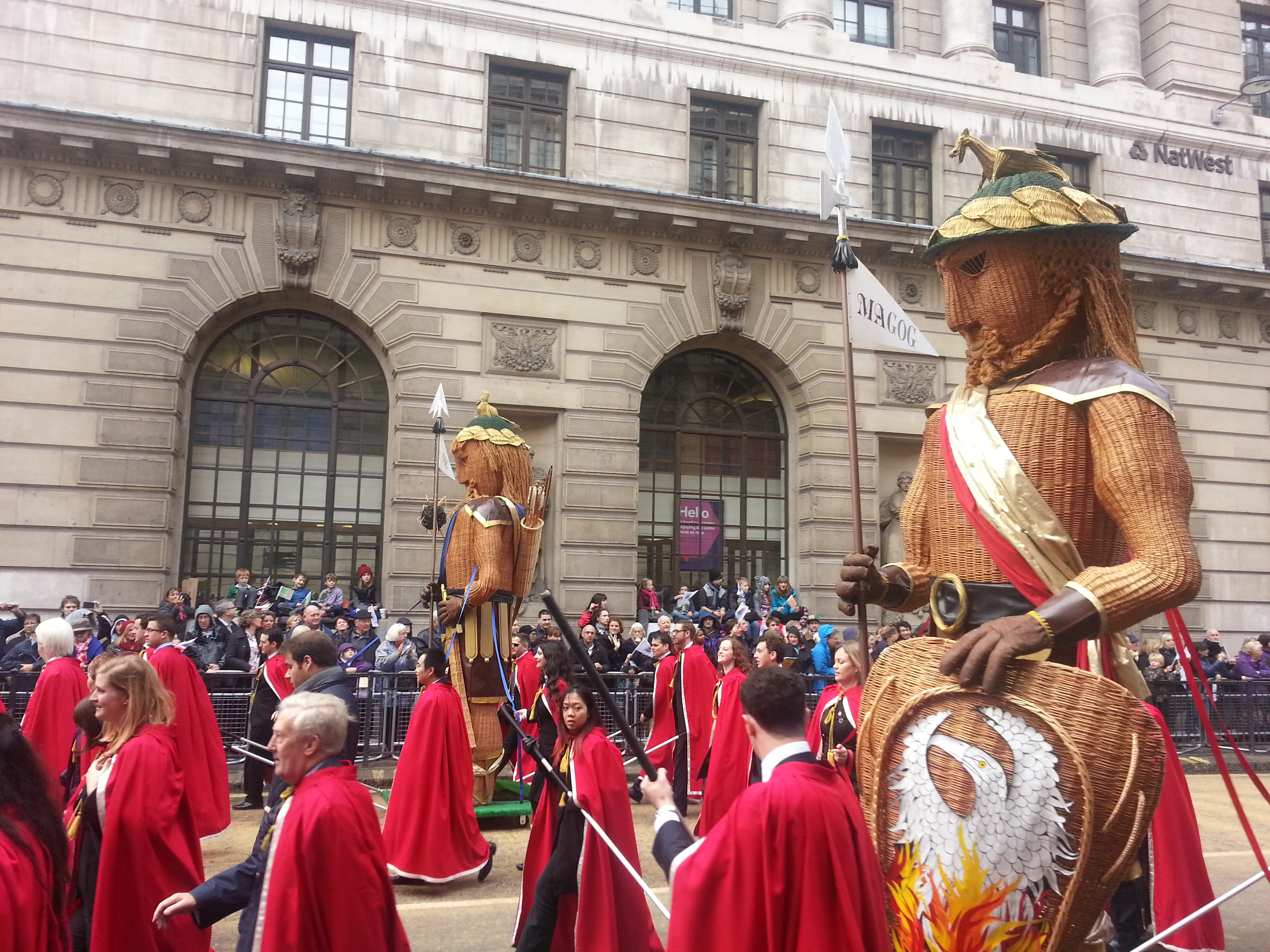
Gog and Magog effigies being carried in the Lord Mayor's Show in London

The Lord Mayor's account of Gogmagog says that the Roman emperor Diocletian had thirty-three wicked daughters. He found thirty-three husbands for them to curb their wicked ways; they chafed at this, and under the leadership of the eldest sister, Alba, they murdered their husbands. For this crime they were set adrift at sea; they washed ashore on a windswept island, which they named "Albion"—after Alba. Here they coupled with demons and gave birth to a race of giants, whose descendants included Gog and Magog. The effigies of two giants were recorded in 1558 at the coronation of Elizabeth I and were described as "Gogmagot the Albion" and "Corineus the Britain". These, or similar figures, made of "wickerwork and pasteboard" made regular appearances in the Lord Mayor's Show thereafter, although they became known as Gog and Magog over the years. New figures were carved from pine in 1709 by Captain Richard Saunders and displayed in the Guildhall until 1940 when they were destroyed in an air-raid; they were replaced by David Evans in 1953.

Images of Gog and Magog (depicted as giants) are carried before Lord Mayors of the City of London in a traditional procession in the Lord Mayor's Show each year on the second Saturday of November.

== In French literature ==
Under the influence of Geoffrey's Gogmagog (Goemagot), Gos et Magos, the French rendition of "Gog and Magog", were recast in the role of enemies defeated by the giant Gargantua, and taken prisoner to King Arthur who held court in London in Rabelais's Gargantua (1534). (Note: This was first set out in Les grandes et inestimables cronicques (1532) though better known in Rabelais's Gargantua.) Gargantua's son Pantagruel also had an ancestor named Gemmagog, whose name was also a corruption of "Gog and Magog", influenced by the British legend.

== In Irish folklore ==
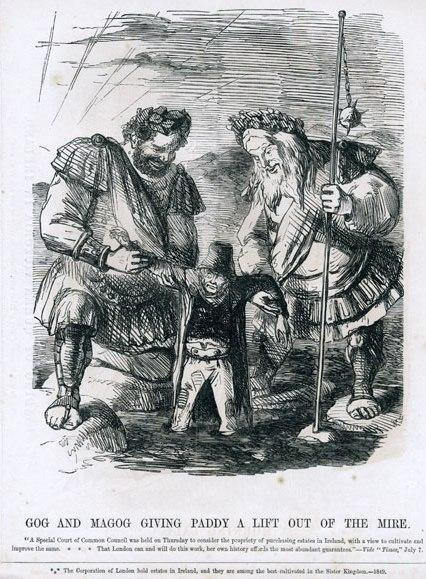
"Gog and Magog giving Paddy a Lift Out of the Mire." From Punch magazine, 1849. Here the giants stand for London, said to be assisting Ireland after the famine by purchasing land to improve trade.

Works of Irish mythology, including the Lebor Gabála Érenn (the Book of Invasions), expand on Magog and make him the ancestor of Irish through Partholón, leader of the first group to colonise Ireland after the Deluge, and a descendant of Magog, as also were the Milesians, the people of the fifth invasion of Ireland. Magog was also the progenitor of the Scythians, as well as of numerous other races across Europe and Central Asia.
