= Louis Donnadieu =

French politician (1930–2026)

Deputy of the French National Assembly for Tarn's 2nd constituency
- In office 7 May 1978 – 22 May 1981
- Preceded by: Jacques Limouzy
- Succeeded by: Jean-Pierre Gabarrou
- In office 13 May 1973 – 10 April 1975
- Preceded by: Jacques Limouzy
- Succeeded by: Jacques Limouzy
- In office 23 July 1969 – 1 April 1973
- Preceded by: Jacques Limouzy
- Succeeded by: Jacques Limouzy

Mayor of Bout-du-Pont-de-Larn
- In office March 1971 – March 1989
- Preceded by: André Caville
- Succeeded by: Jean Marty

Personal details
- Born: 17 March 1930 Saint-Étienne-d'Albagnan, France
- Died: 7 June 2026 (aged 96)
- Party: UDR; RPR
- Occupation: Doctor

Louis Donnadieu (French: [lwˈi dɔnadjˈø]; 17 March 1930 – 7 June 2026) was a French politician of the Union of Democrats for the Republic (UDR) and the Rally for the Republic (RPR).

Donnadieu notably served three terms as a deputy in the National Assembly: from 1969 to 1973, from 1973 to 1975, and from 1978 to 1981. He was also mayor of Bout-du-Pont-de-Larn from 1971 to 1989.

Donnadieu died on 7 June 2026, at the age of 96.
