= Frédéric Bourguet =

French politician (1889–1978)

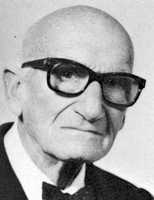

French Senator
- In office 20 October 1974 – 2 October 1977
- Preceded by: Fernand Verdeille
- Succeeded by: Georges Spénale

President of the Comité départemental de libération of Tarn
- In office 1944–1945

Conseiller général of Tarn
- In office 1925–1942 (Dismissed by Vichy France)
- In office 1945–1976 (Reinstated by GPRF)

Mayor of Labastide-Rouairoux
- In office 1919–1941 (Dismissed by Vichy France)
- In office 1944–1947 (Reinstated by GPRF)

Personal details
- Born: 7 February 1889 Montpellier, France
- Died: 20 April 1978 (aged 89) Labastide-Rouairoux, France
- Education: University of Montpellier

Military service
- Allegiance: French Third Republic; (Free France) French Resistance
- Branch/service: Train
- Rank: Chef d'escadron

Jean Auguste Frédéric Bourguet (7 February 1889 – 20 April 1978) was a French industrialist and politician who led the French Resistance in the Tarn department during World War II.

== Biography ==
He graduated from the University of Montpellier as Doctor of Law and practiced as a lawyer for a few years.

In 1912, he took over the textile factory of his family-in-law in Labastide-Rouairoux. "Imbued with social convictions", he offered free housing to his workers and implemented an inflation-based salary scale in order to protect his employees' purchasing power. He employed up to 300 people at once in the factory.

Right after World War I, he became mayor of Labastide-Rouairoux and was reelected until 1947. Between 1925 and 1976, he was also elected conseiller général of the Tarn department.

During World War II, when Southern France was annexed by Nazi Germany, Bourguet got involved into the Resistance, and soon became its leader in the Tarn. In 1944, he was nominated by Free France as president of the Comité départemental de libération.

In 1974, he became senator and held office until 1977.

== Honours ==
- Officier of the Legion of Honour (1953)
- 1914–1918 War Cross
- Resistance Medal (1945)
- Chevalier of the Academic Palms
- Commandeur of the Order of Commercial Merit
- Médaille d'honneur départementale et communale, gold (1958)
