= Albino (name) =

Albino is both a given name and a surname. Notable people with the name include:

== Given name ==
- Albino Aboug (born 1979), South Sudanese politician
- Albino Jara (1877–1912), provisional President of Paraguay from 19 January to 5 July 1911
- Albino Luciani (1912–1978), better known as Pope John Paul I
- Albino Souza Cruz (1869–1962), Brazilian businessman
- Albino Núñez Domínguez (1901–1974), Galician writer and poet
- Albino Pérez (died 1837), Mexican soldier and politician
- Albino Pierro (1916–1995), Italian poet
- Albino SyCip, Chinese-Filipino financier

== Surname ==
- Francisco Alves Albino (1912–1993), Portuguese footballer
- Johnny Albino (1919–2011), Puerto Rican bolero singer
- Nina and Natalie Albino (Puerto Rican identical twins born 1984), who form the musical duo Nina Sky
