= Sauveterre, Tarn =

Sauveterre
- Commune
- Coat of arms
- Location of Sauveterre
- Location within France Location within Occitanie
- Coordinates: 43°28′31″N 2°33′12″E
- Country: France
- Region: Occitania
- Department: Tarn
- Arrondissement: Castres
- Canton: Mazamet-2 Vallée du Thoré
- Intercommunality: Thoré Montagne Noire

Government
  - Mayor (2020–2026): Jacques Assemat
- Area^{1}: 12.39 km^{2} (4.78 sq mi)
- Elevation: 301 m (988 ft)
- Highest elevation: 986 m (3,235 ft)
- Lowest elevation: 279 m (915 ft)
- Population (2023): 188
  - Density: 15.2/km^{2} (39.3/sq mi)
- Time zone: UTC+01:00 (CET)
  - Summer (DST): UTC+02:00 (CEST)
- INSEE/Postal code: 81278 /81240
- ^{1} French Land Register data, which excludes lakes, ponds, glaciers > 1 km^{2} (0.386 sq mi or 247 acres) and river estuaries.

Sauveterre (French pronunciation: [sovtɛʁ]; Occitan: Sauvatèrra, meaning safe land) is a commune in the Tarn department in southern France.

== Geography ==
The Thoré forms the commune's northern border.

== See also ==
- Communes of the Tarn department
