= Saint Albina =

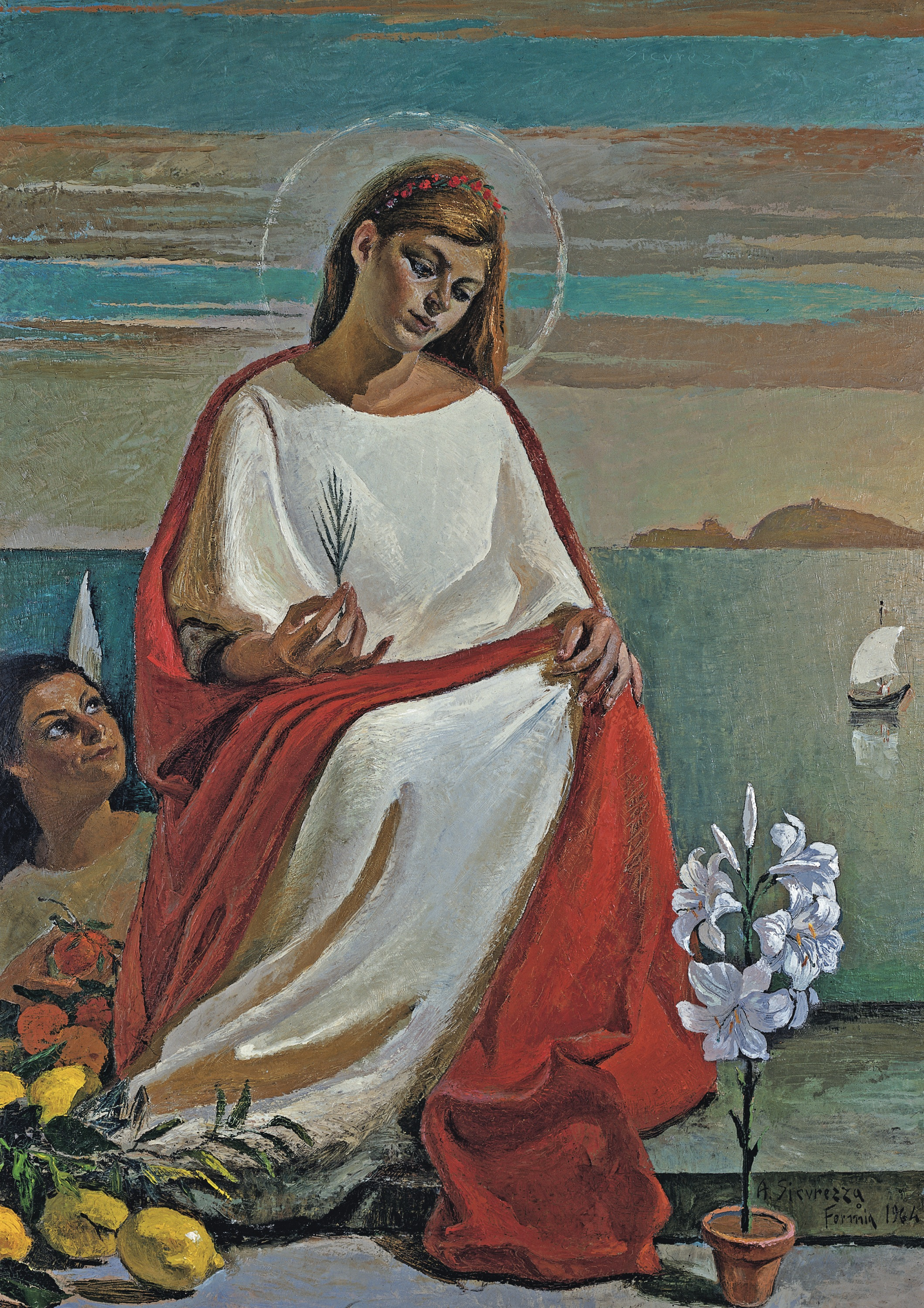
Saint Albina, painting by Antonio Sicurezza. The palm-leaf in her hand is the attribute of the martyr in Christian iconography.

The name Albina comes from Albina, "the White Goddess," the Etruscan goddess of the dawn and protector of ill-fated lovers. It was a common name in ancient Rome. According to Nennius, Britain gains its earliest name, Albion from Albina, the White Goddess, the eldest of the fifty Danaïdes. There appear to be several different women named Albina remembered as saints in the Roman Catholic Church.

== 2nd century ==
Albina refers to a woman put to death in the second century, along with her brother Paxentius, during the reign of Marcus Aurelius (161-180). Their relics ended up in Saint-Martin-des-Champs Priory after being sent from Rome to Paris, and their fate is recorded in a Parisian breviary. This Albina's feast day is 23 September.

Albina also refers to a Roman woman beheaded because she was a Roman citizen as one of the Martyrs of Lyon AD 177.

== 3rd century ==
According to the Roman Martyrology, Saint Albina was a young woman from Caesarea, Palestine, who died a martyr in the third century, during the reign of the emperor Decius, ca. 250. There are two conflicting traditions: one, the Greek tradition, is that she died in Caesarea; another, cited in the Martyrology, states that she was brought to Italy and was killed in the town of Formia. Her remains are kept in the cathedral of the Italian city of Gaeta. According to the Greek tradition, they were miraculously transported there. This is the Saint Albina depicted in the picture, venerated as a saint in Italy. Her feast day is 16 December.

== 4th century ==
Another Albina, who died on 4 March 387, was the mother of Saint Marcella. The Bollandists Henchenius and Papenbroch (of the Acta Sanctorum) did not consider her inclusion in the calendar properly supported by authority. Athanasius of Alexandria may have stayed at her house in Rome. Another Albina is said to have been martyred in Rome "with many others", according to the Acta Sanctorum. Her feast day is 17 February.
