= Le Rialet =

- Commune
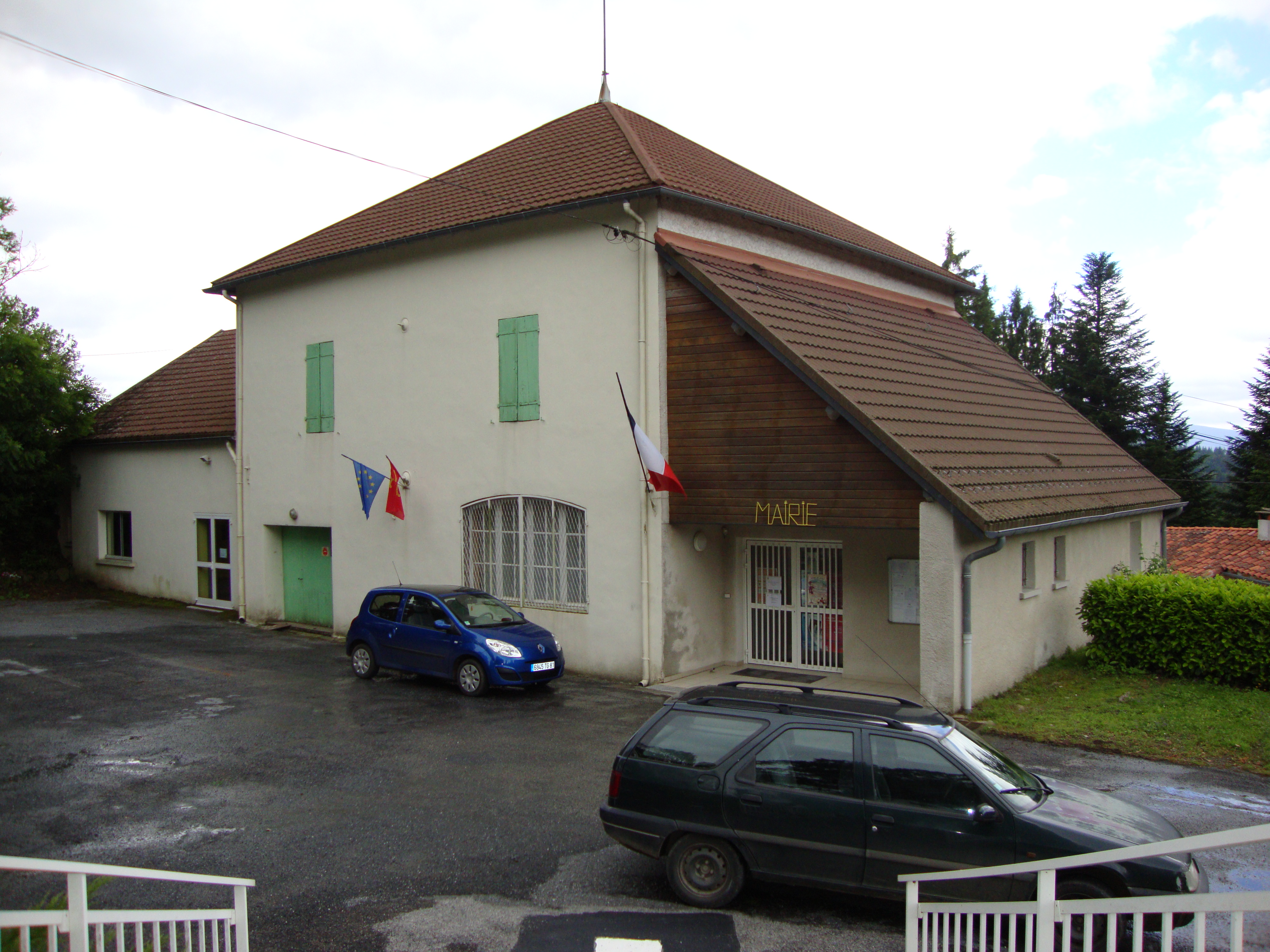
- The town hall in Le Rialet
- Location of Le Rialet
- Location within France Location within Occitanie
- Coordinates: 43°33′43″N 2°27′43″E
- Country: France
- Region: Occitania
- Department: Tarn
- Arrondissement: Castres
- Canton: Mazamet-2 Vallée du Thoré
- Intercommunality: Thoré Montagne Noire

Government
  - Mayor (2020–2026): Michel Castan
- Area^{1}: 7.64 km^{2} (2.95 sq mi)
- Elevation: 695 m (2,280 ft)
- Highest elevation: 783 m (2,569 ft)
- Lowest elevation: 581 m (1,906 ft)
- Population (2023): 63
  - Density: 8.2/km^{2} (21/sq mi)
- Time zone: UTC+01:00 (CET)
  - Summer (DST): UTC+02:00 (CEST)
- INSEE/Postal code: 81223 /81240
- ^{1} French Land Register data, which excludes lakes, ponds, glaciers > 1 km^{2} (0.386 sq mi or 247 acres) and river estuaries.

Le Rialet (French pronunciation: [lə ʁjalɛ]; Occitan: Lo Rialet) is a commune in the Tarn department in southern France.

== See also ==
- Communes of the Tarn department
