= Rouairoux =

- Commune
- Coat of arms
- Location of Rouairoux
- Location within France Location within Occitanie
- Coordinates: 43°29′34″N 2°34′09″E
- Country: France
- Region: Occitania
- Department: Tarn
- Arrondissement: Castres
- Canton: Mazamet-2 Vallée du Thoré

Government
  - Mayor (2020–2026): Danièle Escudier
- Area^{1}: 28.48 km^{2} (11.00 sq mi)
- Elevation: 573 m (1,880 ft)
- Highest elevation: 863 m (2,831 ft)
- Lowest elevation: 279 m (915 ft)
- Population (2023): 389
  - Density: 13.7/km^{2} (35.4/sq mi)
- Time zone: UTC+01:00 (CET)
  - Summer (DST): UTC+02:00 (CEST)
- INSEE/Postal code: 81231 /81240
- ^{1} French Land Register data, which excludes lakes, ponds, glaciers > 1 km^{2} (0.386 sq mi or 247 acres) and river estuaries.

Rouairoux (French pronunciation: [ʁwɛʁu]; Occitan: Roairós) is a commune in the Tarn department in southern France.

== Geography ==
The Thoré forms the commune's southern border; the Fontanelles, a tributary of the Thoré, forms part of its eastern border; the Peyrettes, another tributary of the Thoré, forms most of its western border.

== See also ==
- Communes of the Tarn department
