= Albino Núñez Domínguez =

Galician poet and writer (1901–1974)

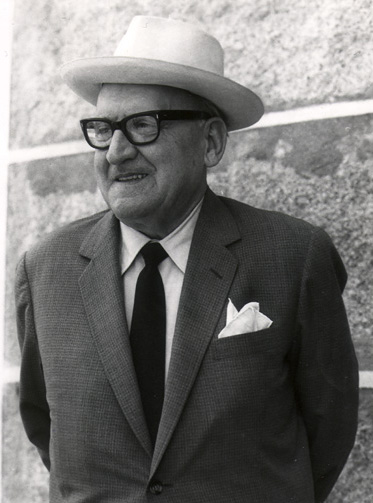
Albino Núñez Domínguez

Albino Núñez Domínguez (December 13, 1901 – February 7, 1974) was a Galician writer and poet.

== Life ==
He was born in San Pedro da Mezquita, A Merca, Ourense, Galicia, a region of northwest Spain. He wrote in both Galician and Castilian, and worked as a teacher in the areas of Amoroce and Maceda (Ourense). In the impoverished Galician village atmosphere, a love-affair with pedagogy began, which would be the great passion of his life.

In 1932 he was the director of a pedagogical magazine Escuela del Trabajo (School of Work), published by ATEO (Asociacion de Trabajadores de la Ensenanza de Orense, Ourense Teachers Association), of which he was president. The magazine had a successful two-year run, with twenty-six published editions, and caused an authentic revolution within the education system, which was anchored in the old methods of the time. Nuñez imposed on this system a distinctively technical and pedagogical character, rejecting the old methods of memorisation and excessive intellectualism completely. He introduced methods from the new school, based on the latest pedagogical doctrines, and worked tentatively, yet steadily towards their establishment. It was the beginning of the introduction of new pedagogical techniques to schools in Ourense, and Nuñez was the central figure in this change (Montessori, Kerschensteiner, Ovide Decroly, Dewey, Cousinet, etc.).

Headmaster at «Concepción Arenal» school, in A Coruña, he continued developing the new scholastic techniques, establishing "new aims" of the education and orienting the social work of the school towards those aims. But The Spanish Civil War truncated his humanitarian aspirations. From 1936 on he became dedicated to deprived education, first in Lugo, and later in Orense, where he founded, in 1949 the center for the study of "Estudios Galicia". The interest of this center was mainly the special attention dedicated to the formation of teachers who would soon take the new techniques of education to their classrooms.

In August 1959 he was reinstated, first as a teacher and soon after as school headmaster, holding his last position in A Estrada (Pontevedra). The primary school of Casardomato (Ourense) was named after him by city council agreement (1980).

== Works ==
Although most of the work of Albino Núñez Domínguez remains unpublished, some interesting works can be mentioned:

- Parnaso Galaico (1956)
- Musa Galega (1957)
- A nosa fala (1958)
- Maruxa ou a femineidade' (1958)
- Grandezas e miserias da nosa terra (1959)
- Nin lendas negras nin historias brancas (1962)
- Toponimia galaica (1965)
- Romance de Castrelo de Miño

He also wrote the book Temas de pedagogía (Ourense, 1963), where his educative ideals are gathered, based on his personal experiences and deep readings of the most important pedagogy experts of the time. He defended active and functional schooling, respect and freedom of pupils and advocated the heuristic-socratic method as the most suitable to achieve scientific knowledge.

AsAside from his educative work, Núñez Domínguez made geographic studies, research into toponymy and literature, collaborated assiduously with the press -La Región, La Voz de Galicia, Faro de Vigo, La Noche, Lar, Vieiros, ABC, El Pueblo Gallego, Irmandade (Caracas) ...- and translated poems by Antonio Machado to Galician.
