= Albino Rock Lighthouse =

Lighthouse in Queensland, Australia

Albino Rock lighthouse
- Location: Albino Rock, Queensland, Australia
- Coordinates: 18°46′21″S 146°43′05″E

Tower
- Constructed: Unknown
- Construction: concrete
- Height: 5 m (16 ft)
- Shape: square

Light
- Focal height: 26 m (85 ft)
- Intensity: 15,000 candela
- Range: 15 mi (24 km)
- Characteristic: Fl W 20s

Plans for the Albino Rock Lighthouse were published in 1940 with construction scheduled to begin the same year. The plans showed a 30-foot (9.1 m) tower with square white concrete standing at a base elevation of 96 feet (29 m). It was the last light to complete the chain along Northern Queensland to Torres Strait. 44 miles (71 km) to the north lay the Hinchinbrook Light, and 32 miles (51 km) to the south was Cape Cleveland Light. The light characteristic was white with three flashes every 20 seconds (Fl.W.20s), 15,000 candlepower, and 15 miles (24 km) visibility.

In 2012, after showing significant cracking and deterioration, the tower was completely demolished down to the concrete base and replaced with a fiberglass hexagonal tower. The former Fresnel lens is on display at the Townsville Maritime Museum.
