= Verreries-de-Moussans =

- Commune
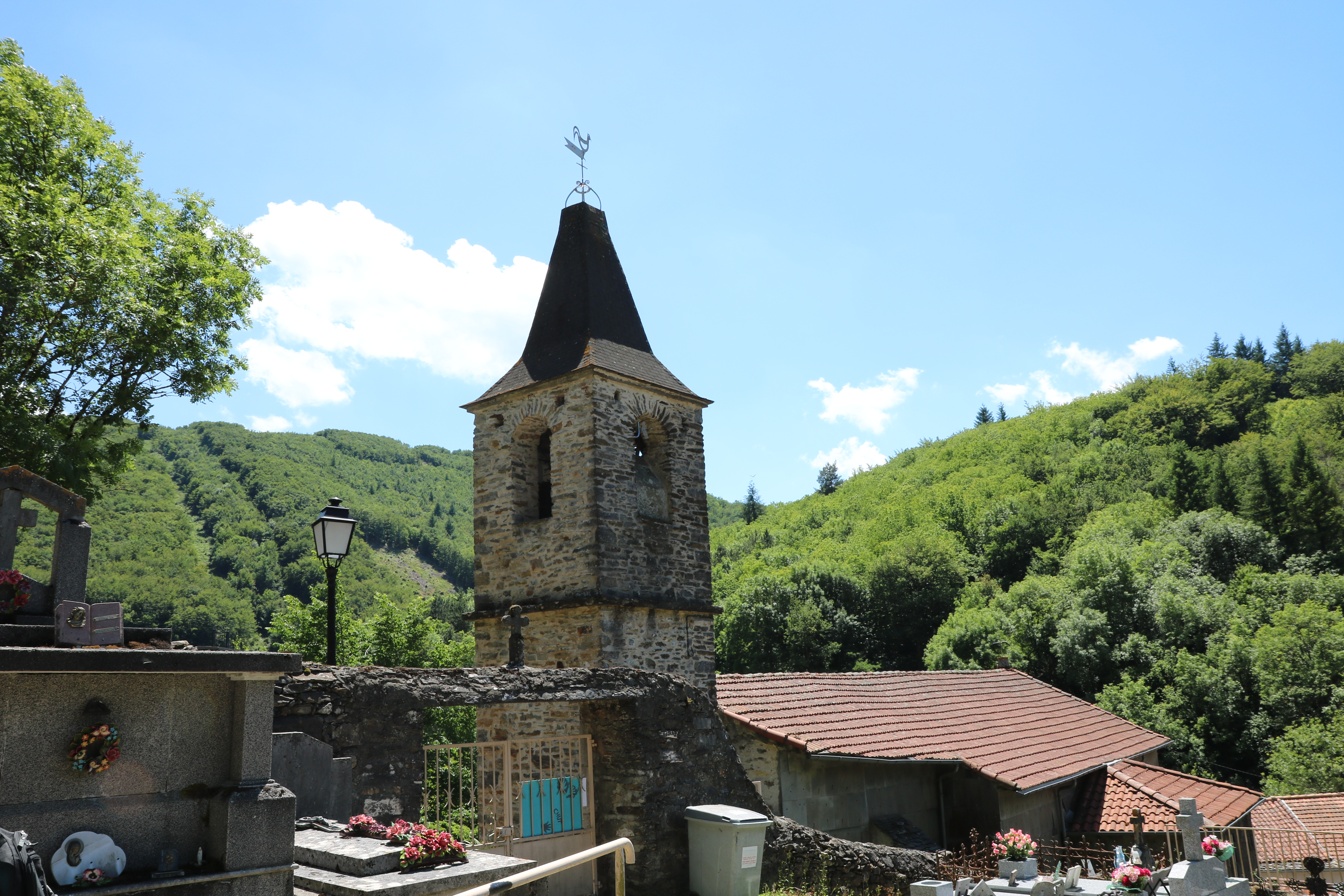
- Church of Saint-Thomas

- Coat of arms
- Location of Verreries-de-Moussans
- Location within France Location within Occitanie
- Coordinates: 43°26′57″N 2°41′12″E
- Country: France
- Region: Occitania
- Department: Hérault
- Arrondissement: Béziers
- Canton: Saint-Pons-de-Thomières
- Intercommunality: CC du Minervois au Caroux

Government
  - Mayor (2020–2026): Franck Poujol-Ricard
- Area^{1}: 18.69 km^{2} (7.22 sq mi)
- Elevation: 460 m (1,510 ft)
- Highest elevation: 849 m (2,785 ft)
- Lowest elevation: 404 m (1,325 ft)
- Population (2023): 84
  - Density: 4.5/km^{2} (12/sq mi)
- Time zone: UTC+01:00 (CET)
  - Summer (DST): UTC+02:00 (CEST)
- INSEE/Postal code: 34331 /34220
- ^{1} French Land Register data, which excludes lakes, ponds, glaciers > 1 km^{2} (0.386 sq mi or 247 acres) and river estuaries.

Verreries-de-Moussans (French pronunciation: [vɛʁ.ʁi də musɑ̃]; Occitan: Las Veirièiras de Moçan) is a commune in the Hérault department in the Occitanie region in southern France.

== Geography ==
The Thoré flows northwest through the commune and forms part of its northwestern border.

== Population ==
Historical population
Year	Pop.	±% p.a.
1968	252	—
1975	139	−8.15%
1982	113	−2.92%
1990	106	−0.80%
1999	105	−0.11%
2007	97	−0.99%
2012	94	−0.63%
2017	97	+0.63%
2023	84	−2.37%
Source: INSEE

== See also ==
- Communes of the Hérault department
