= Thoré =

River in southern France

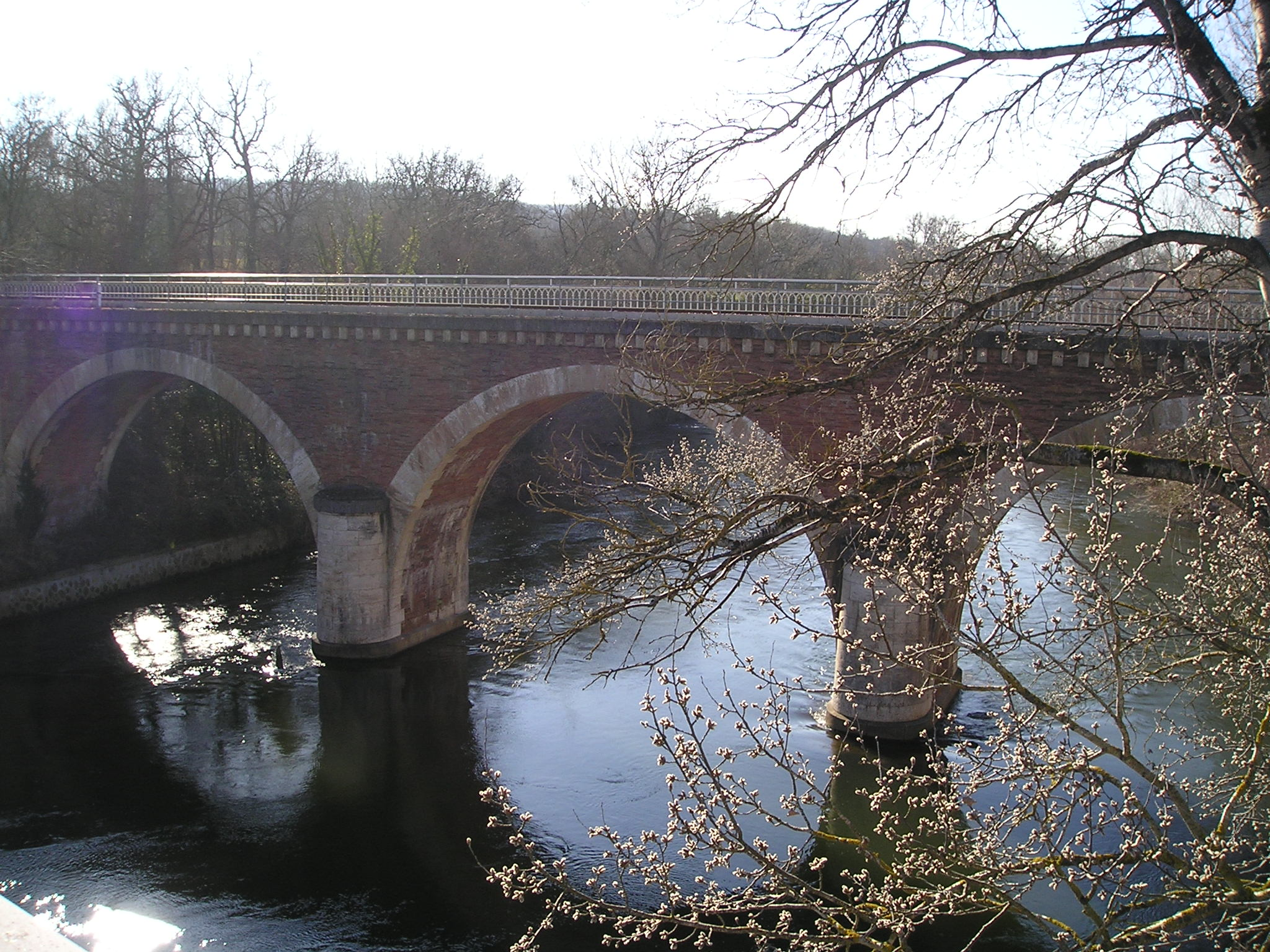

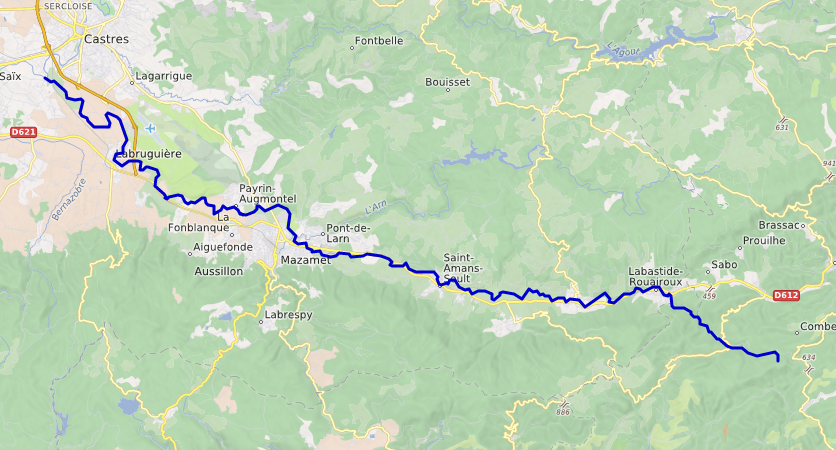

Location
- Country: France

Physical characteristics
- Source
  - location: Rieussec
  - coordinates: 43°26′21″N 02°43′14″E
  - elevation: 800 m (2,600 ft)
- Mouth
  - location: Agout
  - coordinates: 43°34′52″N 02°13′04″E
  - elevation: 163 m (535 ft)
- Length: 61.6 km (38.3 mi)
- Basin size: 608 km^{2} (235 sq mi)
- Discharge
  - average: 15.9 m^{3}/s (560 cu ft/s)

Basin features
- Progression: Agout→ Tarn→ Garonne→ Gironde estuary→ Atlantic Ocean

The Thoré (French pronunciation: [tɔʁe]) is a 61.6-kilometre-long (38.3 mi) river in the Hérault and Tarn departments in southern France. Its source is in the northern part of Rieussec. It flows generally northwest. It is a left tributary of the Agout, into which it flows between Navès and Castres.

== Departments and communes along its course ==
This list is ordered from source to mouth:

- Hérault: Rieussec, Verreries-de-Moussans,
- Tarn: Labastide-Rouairoux, Anglès, Lacabarède, Rouairoux, Sauveterre, Albine, Saint-Amans-Valtoret, Saint-Amans-Soult, Bout-du-Pont-de-Larn, Mazamet, Pont-de-Larn, Aussillon, Payrin-Augmontel, Aiguefonde, Caucalières, Labruguière, Castres, Navès,
