= Pont-de-Larn =

- Commune
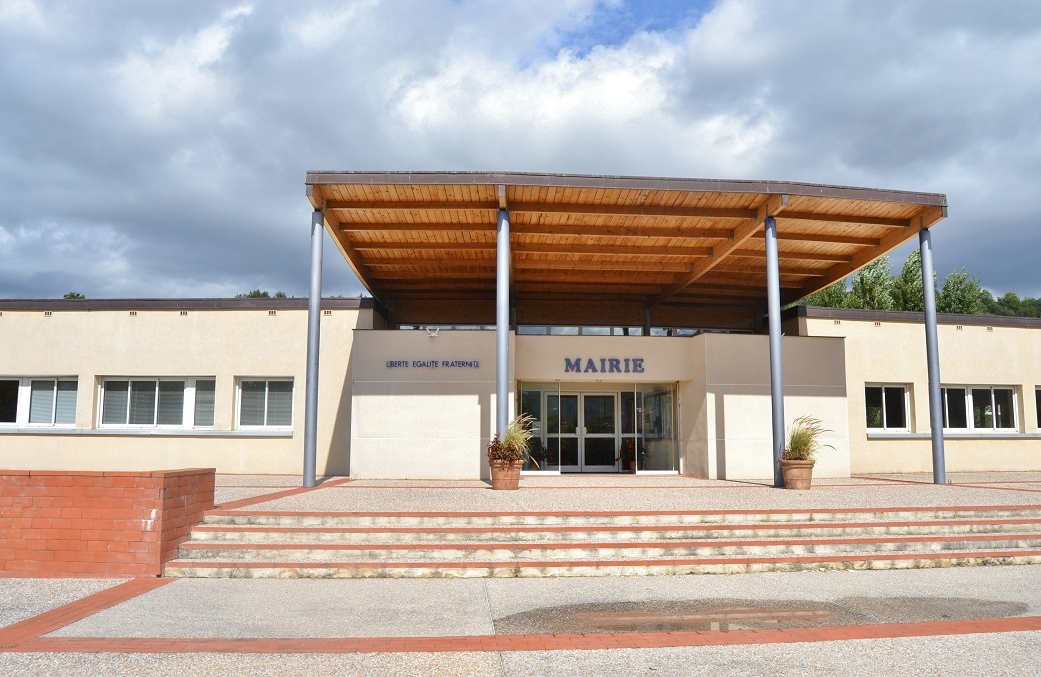
- Town hall

- Coat of arms
- Location of Pont-de-Larn
- Location within France Location within Occitanie
- Coordinates: 43°30′19″N 2°24′24″E
- Country: France
- Region: Occitania
- Department: Tarn
- Arrondissement: Castres
- Canton: Mazamet-2 Vallée du Thoré
- Intercommunality: CA Castres Mazamet

Government
  - Mayor (2020–2026): Christian Carayol
- Area^{1}: 34.51 km^{2} (13.32 sq mi)
- Elevation: 250 m (820 ft)
- Highest elevation: 701 m (2,300 ft)
- Lowest elevation: 202 m (663 ft)
- Population (2023): 2,947
  - Density: 85.40/km^{2} (221.2/sq mi)
- Time zone: UTC+01:00 (CET)
  - Summer (DST): UTC+02:00 (CEST)
- INSEE/Postal code: 81209 /81660
- ^{1} French Land Register data, which excludes lakes, ponds, glaciers > 1 km^{2} (0.386 sq mi or 247 acres) and river estuaries.

Pont-de-Larn (French pronunciation: [pɔ̃ də laʁn]; Occitan: Lo Pont de L'Arn) is a commune in the Tarn department in southern France. It is 2 kilometers from Mazamet in the Occitanie region.

The town is situated on the river Arn (a tributary of the Thoré) in the Haut-Languedoc Regional Nature Park at the foot of the Montagne Noire.

On the sunny side of the Thoré valley, Pont-de-Larn offers residents and guests the ambience of a "country town". There are guest houses and lodges in the vicinity, and marked hiking trails.

There is also a tennis club, stadiums, bowling and one of the oldest golf courses in the region, de la Barouge. The village offers a wide selection of shops, restaurants and services.

Pont-de-Larn can be the starting point for excursions to the Sidobre, the valley of the Orb and the Caroux Lacaune.

== Population ==
Historical population
Year	Pop.	±% p.a.
1968	2,297	—
1975	2,304	+0.04%
1982	2,311	+0.04%
1990	2,525	+1.11%
1999	2,737	+0.90%
2007	2,863	+0.56%
2012	2,882	+0.13%
2017	2,832	−0.35%
2023	2,947	+0.67%
Source: INSEE
