= Canton of Mazamet-2 Vallée du Thoré =

Coordinates: 43.49°N 2.38°E

The canton of Mazamet-2 Vallée du Thoré is an administrative division of the Tarn department, southern France. It was created at the French canton reorganisation which came into effect in March 2015. Its seat is in Mazamet.

It consists of the following communes:

1. Albine
2. Bout-du-Pont-de-Larn
3. Labastide-Rouairoux
4. Lacabarède
5. Mazamet (partly)
6. Pont-de-Larn
7. Le Rialet
8. Rouairoux
9. Saint-Amans-Soult
10. Saint-Amans-Valtoret
11. Sauveterre
12. Le Vintrou
