= Lacabarède =

- Commune
- Coat of arms
- Location of Lacabarède
- Location within France Location within Occitanie
- Coordinates: 43°28′15″N 2°34′58″E
- Country: France
- Region: Occitania
- Department: Tarn
- Arrondissement: Castres
- Canton: Mazamet-2 Vallée du Thoré

Government
  - Mayor (2020–2026): Joël Cabrol
- Area^{1}: 14.5 km^{2} (5.6 sq mi)
- Elevation: 300 m (980 ft)
- Highest elevation: 963 m (3,159 ft)
- Lowest elevation: 320 m (1,050 ft)
- Population (2023): 288
  - Density: 19.9/km^{2} (51.4/sq mi)
- Time zone: UTC+01:00 (CET)
  - Summer (DST): UTC+02:00 (CEST)
- INSEE/Postal code: 81121 /81240
- ^{1} French Land Register data, which excludes lakes, ponds, glaciers > 1 km^{2} (0.386 sq mi or 247 acres) and river estuaries.

Lacabarède (French pronunciation: [lakabaʁɛd]; Occitan: La Cabareda) is a commune in the Tarn department in southern France.

== Geography ==
The Thoré forms the commune's northern border.

== See also ==
- Communes of the Tarn department
