= Juxon baronets =

Extinct English title in use 1660–1740

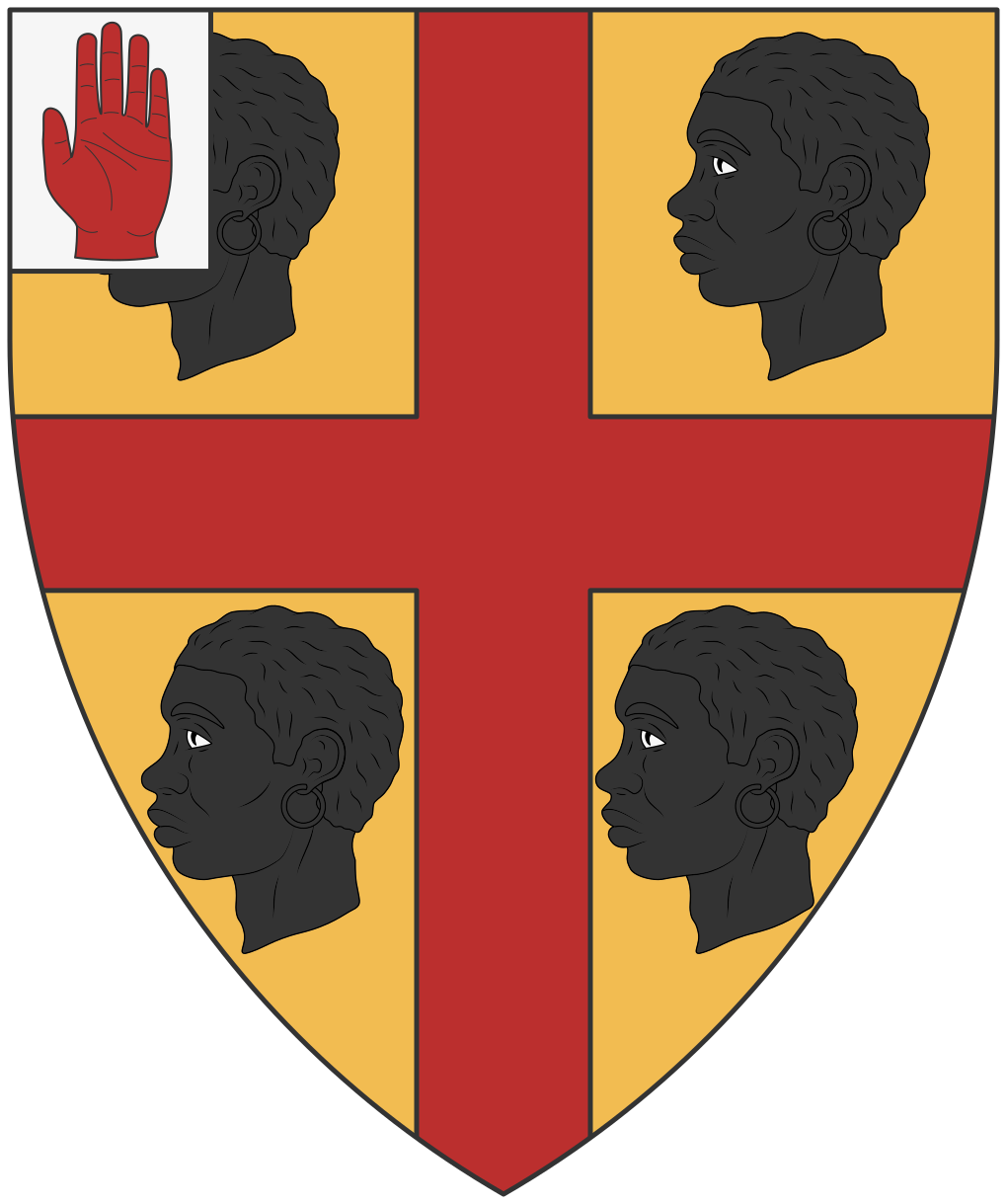
The coat of arms of Juxon of Albourne, Baronets.

The Juxon Baronetcy, of Albourne in the County of Sussex, was a title in the Baronetage of England. It was created on 28 December 1660 for William Juxon. The title became extinct on the death of the second Baronet in 1740.

== Juxon baronets, of Albourne (1660) ==
=== Sir William Juxon, 1st Baronet (1637–1719) ===
He was the son of John Juxon (d. 1655) of Albury Place, Sussex and Anne, daughter and co-heiress of William Michelbourne of Westmeston, Sussex. William Juxon, bishop of London before the civil war and archbishop of Canterbury at the coronation of Charles II was his uncle. He inherited the manors of Little Compton, Warwickshire and Lower Lemington, Gloucestershire from his uncle and married Elizabeth, daughter of Sir John Walter of Sarsden, Oxfordshire. He served as high sheriff of Gloucestershire in 1676. His daughter Elizabeth married James St Amand, apothecary to James II and was the mother of James St. Amand, a classical scholar and book collector.

=== Sir William Juxon, 2nd Baronet (1660–1740) ===
He married Susanna, daughter of John Marriott of Stuston, Suffolk. He was buried at Little Compton. His widow, who held a life interest in Little Compton, Lower Lemington and other property, subsequently married Charles Fane, 2nd Viscount Fane. On her death in 1792 the estate descended to his great-nephew Sir Robert Hesketh, the son of Martha St Amand and Thomas Hesketh of Rufford, Lancashire, who took the name Juxon.
