= Pays-de-Belvès =

- Commune
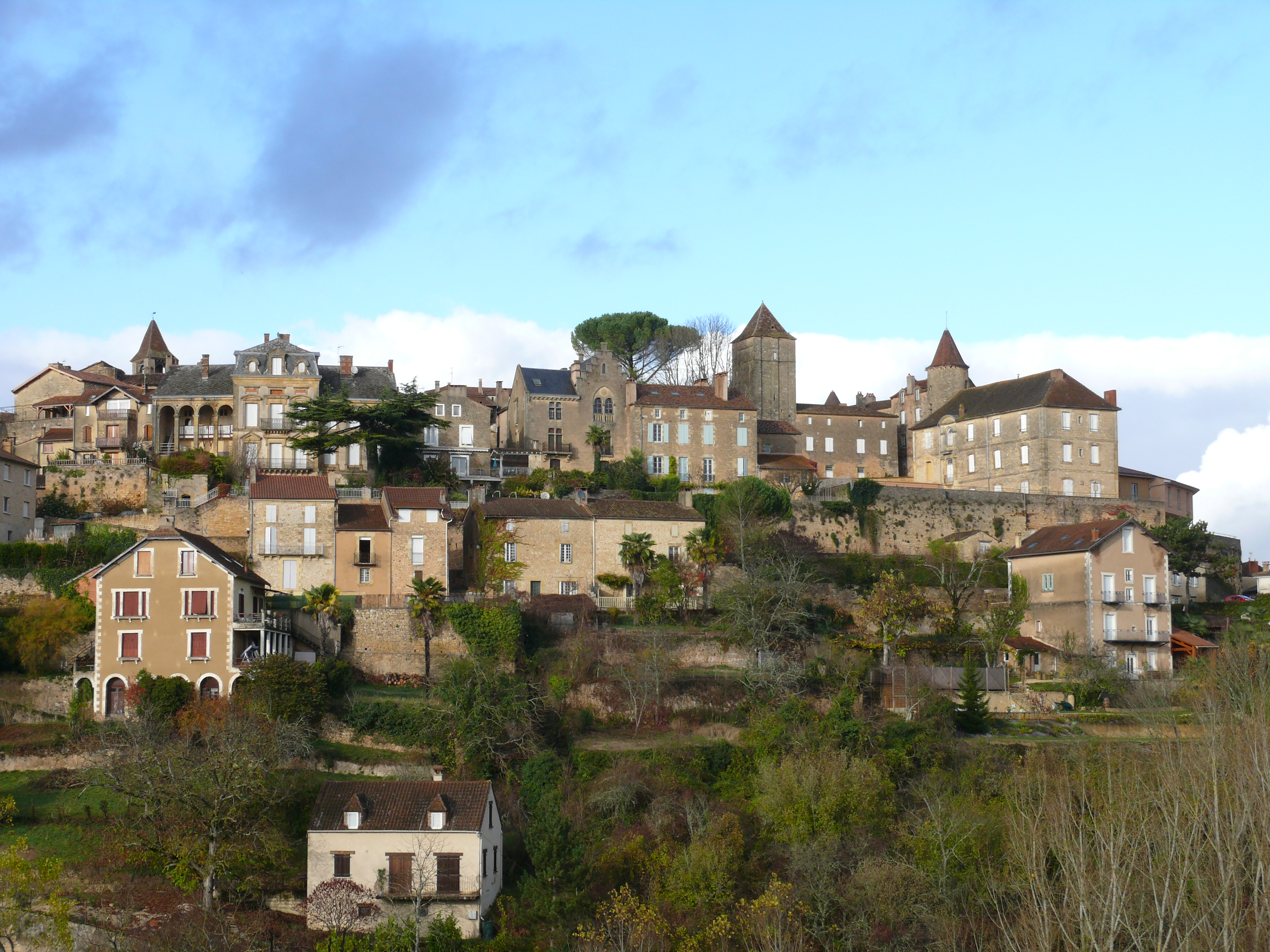
- A general view of Belvès
- Location of Pays-de-Belvès
- Location within France Location within Nouvelle-Aquitaine
- Coordinates: 44°46′37″N 1°00′22″E
- Country: France
- Region: Nouvelle-Aquitaine
- Department: Dordogne
- Arrondissement: Sarlat-la-Canéda
- Canton: Vallée Dordogne

Government
  - Mayor (2020–2026): Christian Leothier
- Area^{1}: 30.72 km^{2} (11.86 sq mi)
- Population (2023): 1,298
  - Density: 42.25/km^{2} (109.4/sq mi)
- Time zone: UTC+01:00 (CET)
  - Summer (DST): UTC+02:00 (CEST)
- INSEE/Postal code: 24035 /24170
- ^{1} French Land Register data, which excludes lakes, ponds, glaciers > 1 km^{2} (0.386 sq mi or 247 acres) and river estuaries.

Pays-de-Belvès (French pronunciation: [pe.i də bɛlvɛs], literally Land of Belvès; Occitan: País de Belvés) is a commune in the Dordogne department of southwestern France. The municipality was established on 1 January 2016 and consists of the former communes of Belvès and Saint-Amand-de-Belvès. Belvès station has rail connections to Périgueux and Agen.

== See also ==
- Communes of the Dordogne department
