= Le Vintrou =

- Commune
- Coat of arms
- Location of Le Vintrou
- Location within France Location within Occitanie
- Coordinates: 43°31′30″N 2°27′47″E
- Country: France
- Region: Occitania
- Department: Tarn
- Arrondissement: Castres
- Canton: Mazamet-2 Vallée du Thoré
- Intercommunality: Thoré Montagne Noire

Government
  - Mayor (2020–2026): Gérard Cauquil
- Area^{1}: 11.38 km^{2} (4.39 sq mi)
- Elevation: 575 m (1,886 ft)
- Highest elevation: 742 m (2,434 ft)
- Lowest elevation: 396 m (1,299 ft)
- Population (2023): 91
  - Density: 8.0/km^{2} (21/sq mi)
- Time zone: UTC+01:00 (CET)
  - Summer (DST): UTC+02:00 (CEST)
- INSEE/Postal code: 81321 /81240
- ^{1} French Land Register data, which excludes lakes, ponds, glaciers > 1 km^{2} (0.386 sq mi or 247 acres) and river estuaries.

Le Vintrou (French pronunciation: [lə vɛ̃tʁu]; Occitan: Lo Vintron) is a commune in the Tarn department in southern France.

== See also ==
- Communes of the Tarn department
