= Belvès =

Commune in Dordogne, France

- Part of Pays-de-Belvès
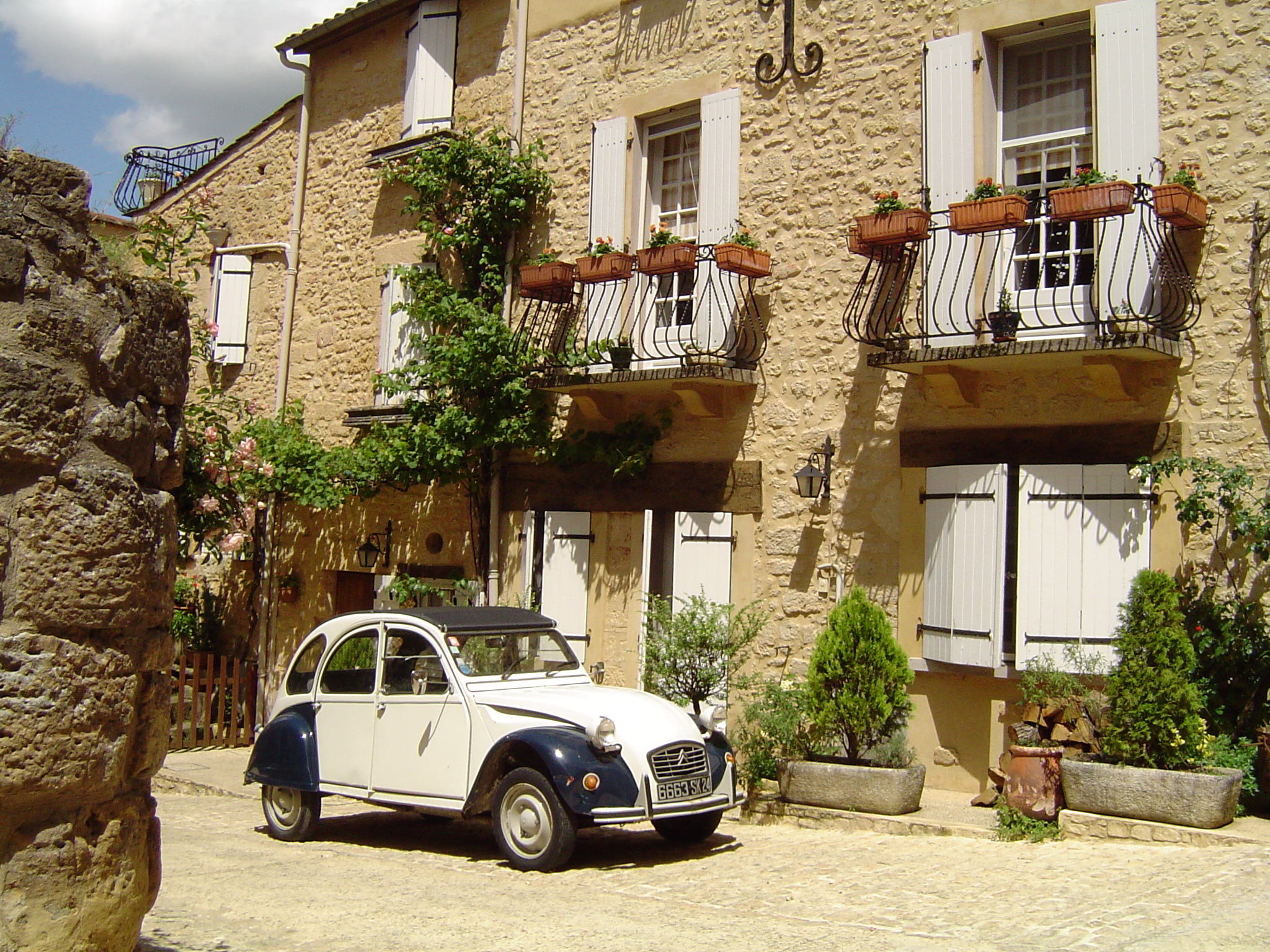

- Coat of arms
- Location of Belvès
- Location within France Location within Nouvelle-Aquitaine
- Coordinates: 44°46′36″N 1°00′29″E
- Country: France
- Region: Nouvelle-Aquitaine
- Department: Dordogne
- Arrondissement: Sarlat-la-Canéda
- Canton: Vallée Dordogne
- Commune: Pays-de-Belvès
- Area^{1}: 23.66 km^{2} (9.14 sq mi)
- Elevation: 190 m (620 ft)
- Highest elevation: 288 m (945 ft)
- Lowest elevation: 82 m (269 ft)
- Population (2022): 1,204
  - Density: 50.89/km^{2} (131.8/sq mi)
- Time zone: UTC+01:00 (CET)
  - Summer (DST): UTC+02:00 (CEST)
- Postal code: 24170
- ^{1} French Land Register data, which excludes lakes, ponds, glaciers > 1 km^{2} (0.386 sq mi or 247 acres) and river estuaries.

Belvès (French pronunciation: [bɛlvɛs]; Languedocien: Belvés) is a former commune in the Dordogne department in southwestern France. In 1973 it absorbed the former commune Fongalop. On 1 January 2016, it was merged into the new commune Pays-de-Belvès.

It is a member of Les Plus Beaux Villages de France. The nearest city is Sarlat-la-Canéda.

== Population ==
Historical population
Year	Pop.	±% p.a.
1866	2,517	—
1962	1,572	−0.49%
1968	1,630	+0.61%
1975	1,623	−0.06%
1982	1,581	−0.37%
1990	1,553	−0.22%
1999	1,431	−0.90%
2006	1,483	+0.51%
2022	1,204	−1.29%
Source: EHESS and INSEE

== Notable inhabitants ==
- Jacques Rispal, (1 August 1923 – 9 February 1986) was a French film actor. He appeared in 100 films between 1952 and 1986.

== See also ==
- Communes of the Dordogne department
