= Rieussec =

- Commune
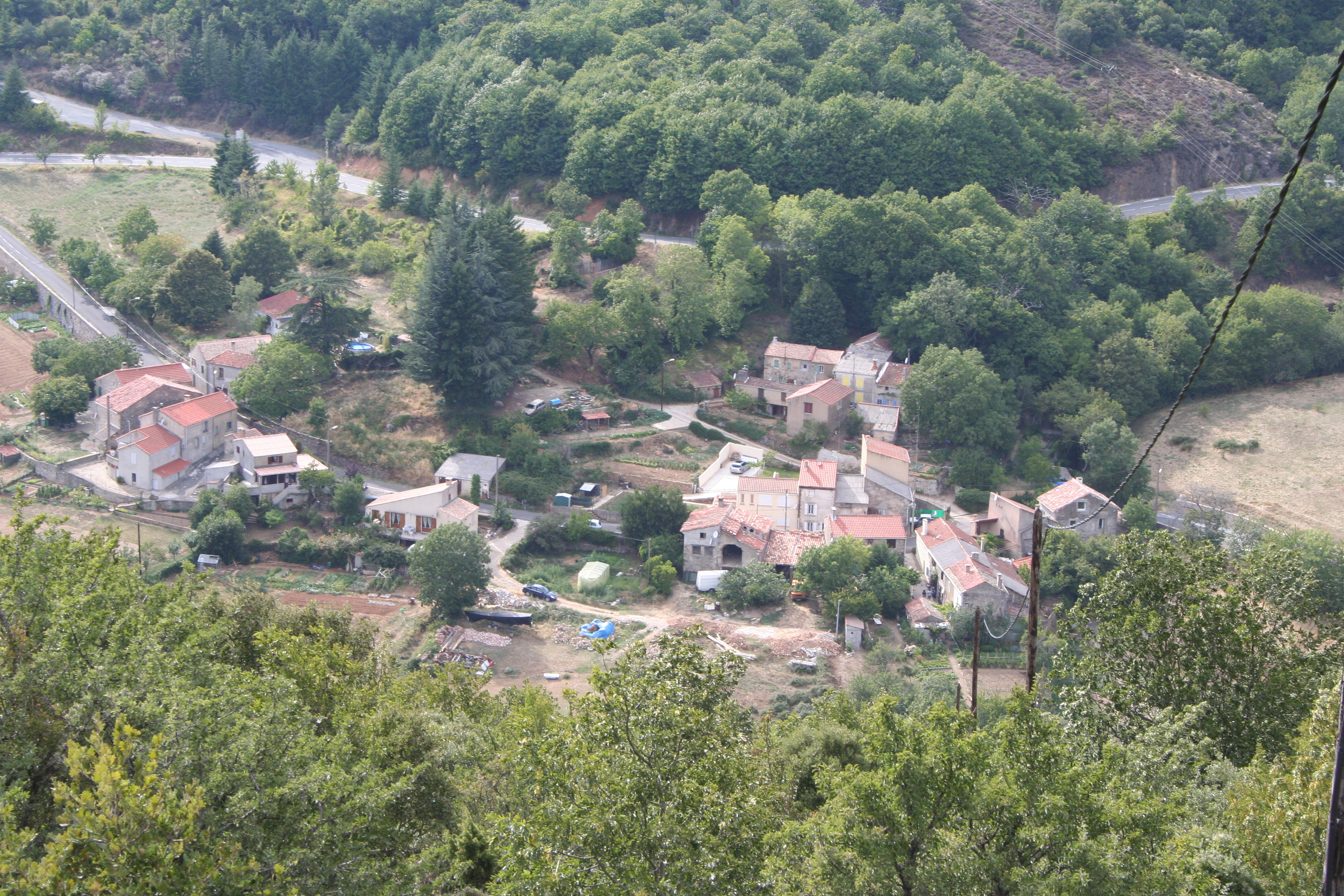
- Rieussec seen from the hillside

- Coat of arms
- Location of Rieussec
- Location within France Location within Occitanie
- Coordinates: 43°25′05″N 2°44′24″E
- Country: France
- Region: Occitania
- Department: Hérault
- Arrondissement: Béziers
- Canton: Saint-Pons-de-Thomières

Government
  - Mayor (2020–2026): Alain Mouly
- Area^{1}: 22.2 km^{2} (8.6 sq mi)
- Elevation: 490 m (1,610 ft)
- Highest elevation: 860 m (2,820 ft)
- Lowest elevation: 314 m (1,030 ft)
- Population (2023): 82
  - Density: 3.7/km^{2} (9.6/sq mi)
- Time zone: UTC+01:00 (CET)
  - Summer (DST): UTC+02:00 (CEST)
- INSEE/Postal code: 34228 /34220
- ^{1} French Land Register data, which excludes lakes, ponds, glaciers > 1 km^{2} (0.386 sq mi or 247 acres) and river estuaries.

Rieussec (French pronunciation: [ʁjøsɛk]; Occitan: Riu Sec, meaning dry river) is a commune in the Hérault department in the Occitanie region in southern France.

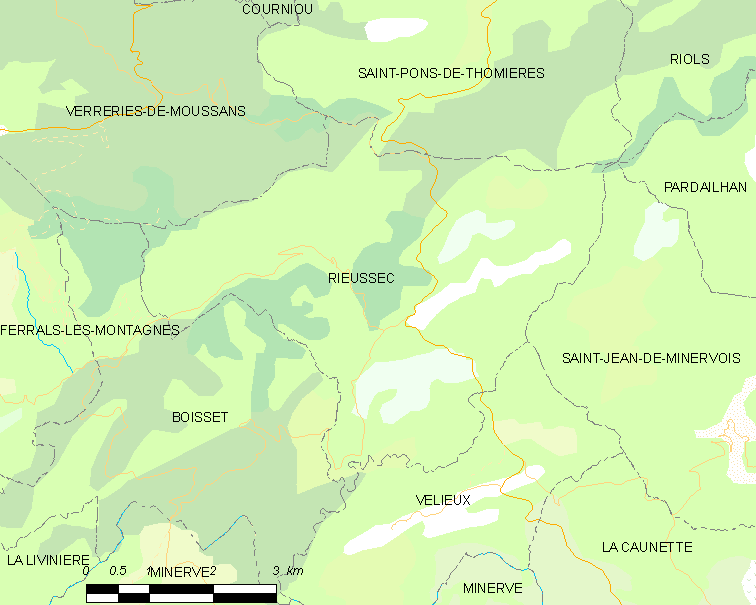
Map

== Population ==
Historical population
Year	Pop.	±% p.a.
1968	70	—
1975	62	−1.72%
1982	71	+1.96%
1990	54	−3.36%
1999	76	+3.87%
2007	96	+2.96%
2012	91	−1.06%
2017	66	−6.22%
2023	82	+3.68%
Source: INSEE

== Geography ==
The Thoré has its source in the northern part of the commune.

== See also ==
- Communes of the Hérault department
