= Saint-Amand-de-Belvès =

- Part of Pays-de-Belvès
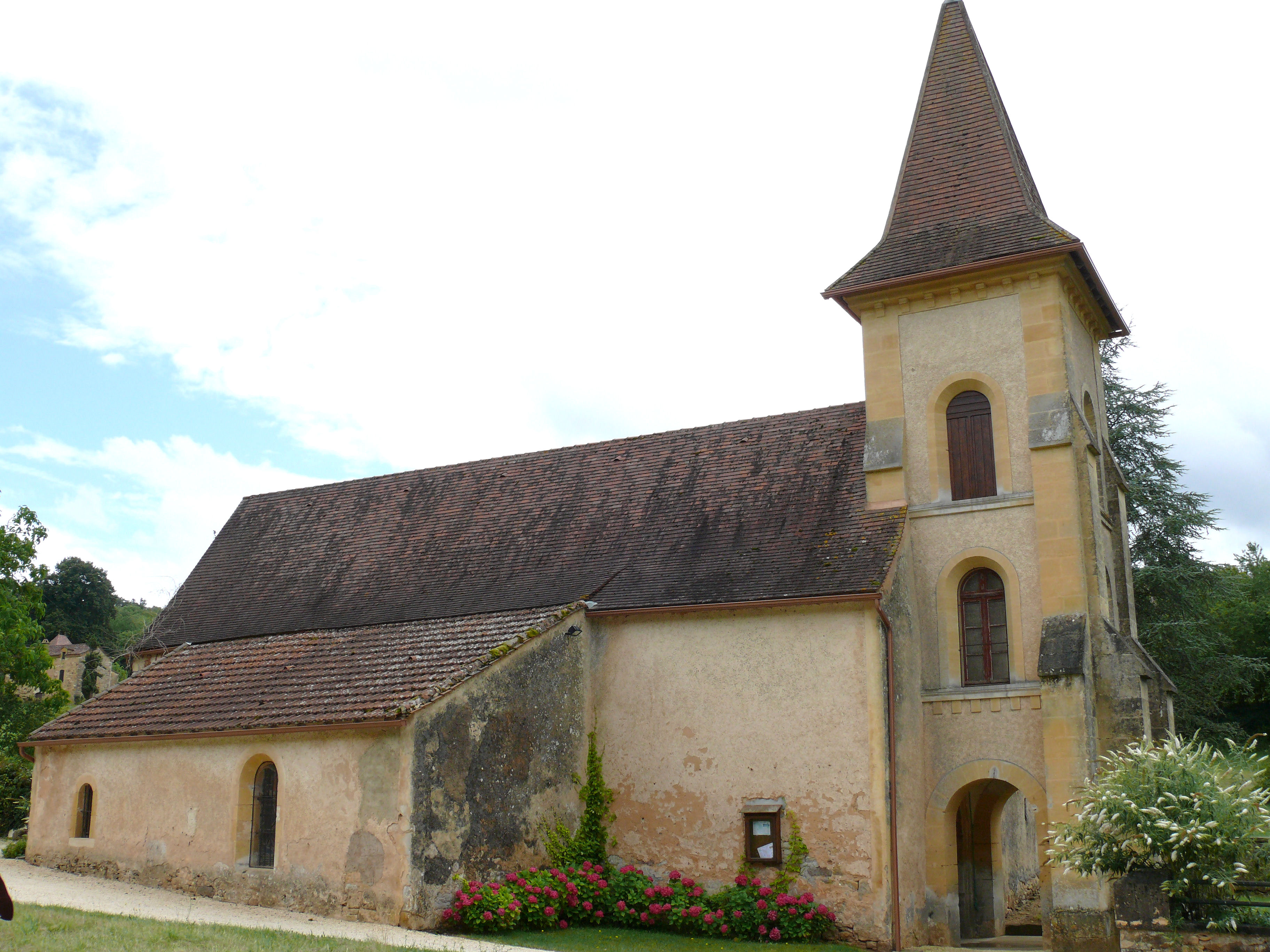
- Location of Saint-Amand-de-Belvès
- Location within France Location within Nouvelle-Aquitaine
- Coordinates: 44°45′44″N 1°02′18″E
- Country: France
- Region: Nouvelle-Aquitaine
- Department: Dordogne
- Arrondissement: Sarlat-la-Canéda
- Canton: Vallée Dordogne
- Commune: Pays-de-Belvès
- Area^{1}: 7.06 km^{2} (2.73 sq mi)
- Elevation: 130 m (430 ft)
- Highest elevation: 257 m (843 ft)
- Lowest elevation: 103 m (338 ft)
- Population (2023): 118
  - Density: 16.7/km^{2} (43.3/sq mi)
- Time zone: UTC+01:00 (CET)
  - Summer (DST): UTC+02:00 (CEST)
- Postal code: 24170
- ^{1} French Land Register data, which excludes lakes, ponds, glaciers > 1 km^{2} (0.386 sq mi or 247 acres) and river estuaries.

Saint-Amand-de-Belvès (French pronunciation: [sɛ̃.t‿amɑ̃ də bɛlvɛs]; Languedocien: Sench Amand de Belvés) is a former commune in the Dordogne department in southwestern France. On 1 January 2016, it was merged into the new commune Pays-de-Belvès.

== See also ==
- Communes of the Dordogne department
