= Albion =

Ancient name for the island of Great Britain

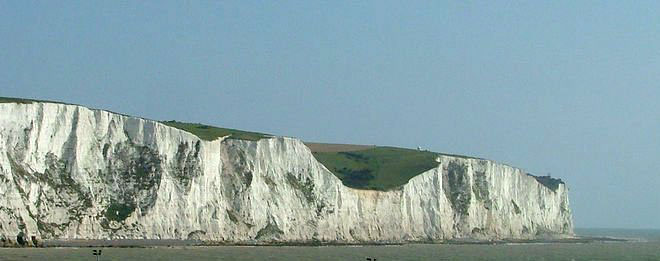
The White Cliffs of Dover may have given rise to the name Albion.

Albion is an alternative name for Great Britain. The oldest attestation of the toponym comes from the Greek language. Today the term is only used poetically.

The name for Scotland in most of the Celtic languages is related to Albion: Alba in Scottish Gaelic, Albain (genitive Alban) in Irish, Nalbin in Manx and Alban in Welsh and Cornish. These names were later Latinised as Albania and Anglicised as Albany, which were once alternative names for Scotland.

New Albion and Albionoria ("Albion of the North") were briefly suggested as names of Canada during the period of the Canadian Confederation. Francis Drake gave the name New Albion to what is now California when he landed there in 1579.

== Etymology ==
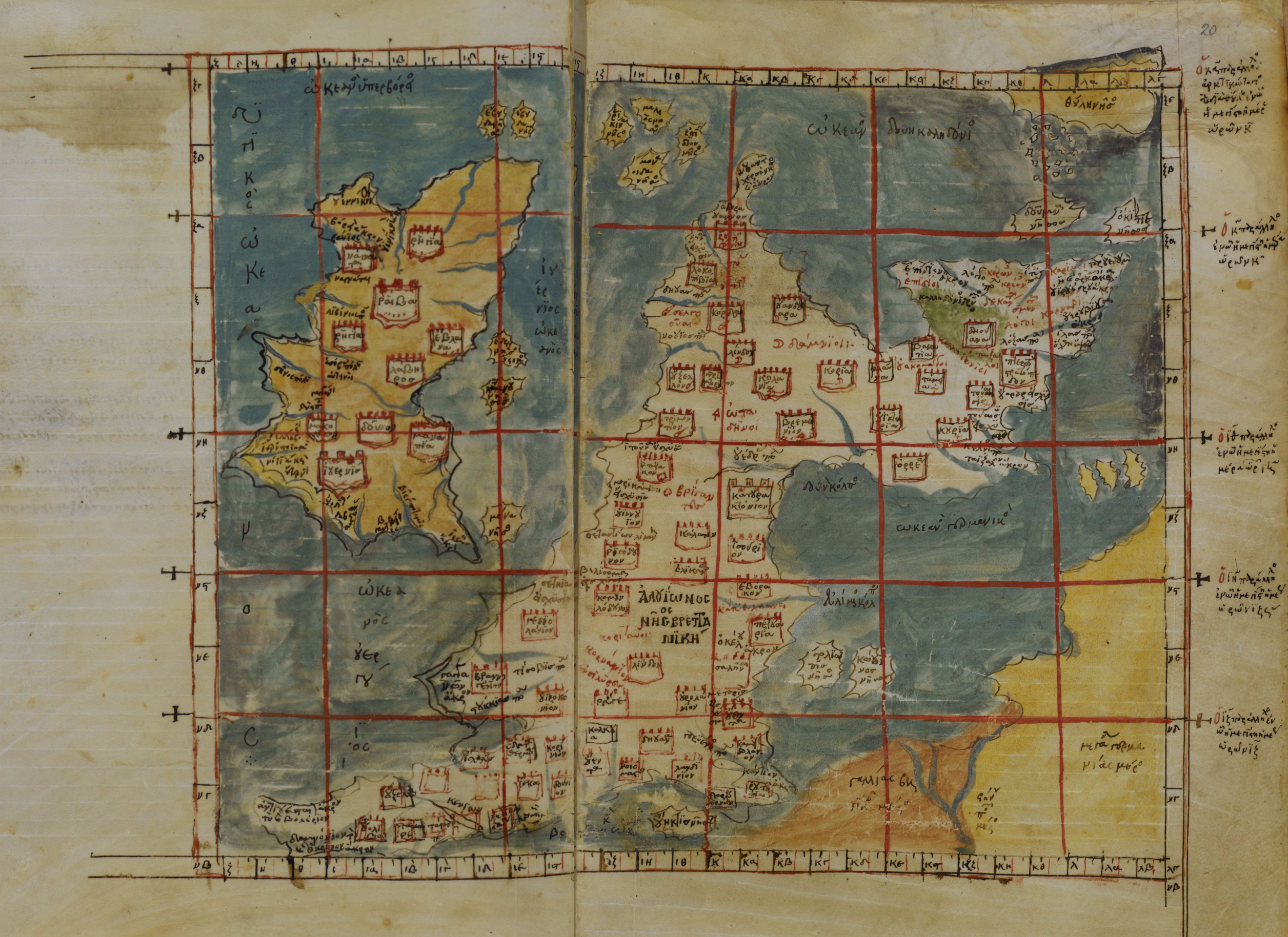
The Codex Vatopedinus's Ptolemy's map of the British Isles, labelled "Ἀλουΐων" (Alouíōn, "Albion") and Ἰουερνία (Iouernía, "Hibernia"). c. 1300

The toponym in English is thought to derive from the Greek word Ἀλβίων mentioned by pseudo-Aristotle in De Mundo, Latinised as Albiōn (genitive Albionis). It is similarly mentioned by Ptolemy in his Geography and Pliny in the Naturalis Historia.

The root *albiyo- is also found in Gaulish and Galatian albio- 'world' and Welsh elfydd (Old Welsh elbid 'earth, world, land, country, district'). It may be related to other European and Mediterranean toponyms such as Alpes, Albania or the river god Alpheus (originally 'whitish'). which has a possible etymology in the Proto-Indo-European word *albʰo- 'white' (cf. Ancient Greek ἀλφός, Latin albus).

The derivation from a word for 'white' is thought to refer perhaps to the white Cliffs of Dover in the southeast, visible from mainland Europe and a landmark at the narrowest crossing point. On the other hand, Celtic linguist Xavier Delamarre argued that it originally meant 'the world above, the visible world', in opposition to 'the world below', i.e. the underworld.

== Attestation ==
Judging from Avienius' Ora Maritima, for which it is considered to have served as a source, the Massaliote Periplus (originally written in the 6th century BC, translated by Avienus at the end of the 4th century AD), does not use the name Britannia; instead it speaks of nēsos Iernōn kai Albiōnōn "the islands of the Iernians and the Albiones". Likewise, Pytheas (c. 320 BC), as directly or indirectly quoted in the surviving excerpts of his works in later writers, speaks of Albiōn and Iernē (Great Britain and Ireland). Pytheas's grasp of the νῆσος Πρεττανική (nēsos Prettanikē, "Prettanic island") is somewhat blurry, and appears to include anything he considers a western island, including Thule.

The name Albion was used by Isidore of Charax (1st century BC – 1st century AD) and subsequently by many classical writers. By the 1st century AD, the name refers unequivocally to Great Britain. But this "enigmatic name for Britain, revived much later by Romantic poets like William Blake, did not remain popular among Greek writers. It was soon replaced by Πρεττανία (Prettanía) and Βρεττανία (Brettanía 'Britain'), Βρεττανός (Brettanós 'Briton'), and Βρεττανικός (Brettanikós, meaning the adjective British). From these words the Romans derived the Latin forms Britannia, Britannus, and Britannicus respectively".

Describing the ocean beyond the Mediterranean Basin, the Pseudo-Aristotelian text On the Universe (Ancient Greek: Περὶ Κόσμου, romanized: Perì Kósmou; Latin: De Mundo) mentions the British Isles, naming the two largest islands Albion and Ierne:

ἐν τούτῳ γε μὴν νῆσοι μέγισται τυγχάνουσιν οὖσαι δύο, Βρεττανικαὶ λεγόμεναι, Ἀλβίων καὶ Ἰέρνη, τῶν προϊστορημένων μείζους, ὑπὲρ τοὺς Κελτοὺς κείμεναι.
There are two very large islands in it, called the British Isles, Albion and Ierne; they are larger than those already mentioned, and lie beyond the land of the Celts.

— Pseudo-Aristotle, On the Universe, 393b

Pliny the Elder, in the fourth book of his Natural History (Latin: Naturalis historia) likewise calls Great Britain Albion. He begins his chapter on the British Isles (Latin: Britanniae, lit. 'the Britains') as follows, after describing the Rhine delta:

Ex adverso huius situs Britannia insula clara Graecis nostrisque monimentis inter septentrionem et occidentem iacet, Germaniae, Galliae, Hispaniae, multo maximis Europae partibus magno intervallo adversa. Albion ipsi nomen fuit, cum Britanniae vocarentur omnes de quibus mox paulo dicemus.
Opposite to this region lies the island of Britain, famous in the Greek records and in our own; it lies to the north-west, facing, across a wide channel, Germany, Gaul and Spain, countries which constitute by far the greater part of Europe. It was itself named Albion, while all the islands about which we shall soon briefly speak were called the Britains.

— Pliny the Elder, Natural History, IV.16

In his 2nd century Geography, Ptolemy uses the name Ἀλουΐων (Alouiōn, "Albion") instead of the Roman name Britannia, possibly following the commentaries of Marinus of Tyre. He calls both Albion and Ierne in Ancient Greek: νῆσοι Βρεττανικαὶ, romanized: nēsoi Brettanikai, lit. 'British Isles'.

In 930, the English king Æthelstan used the title rex et primicerius totius Albionis regni, 'king and chief of the whole realm of Albion'. His nephew, Edgar the Peaceful, styled himself in 970: totius Albionis imperator augustus, 'august emperor of all Albion'.

== The giants of Albion ==
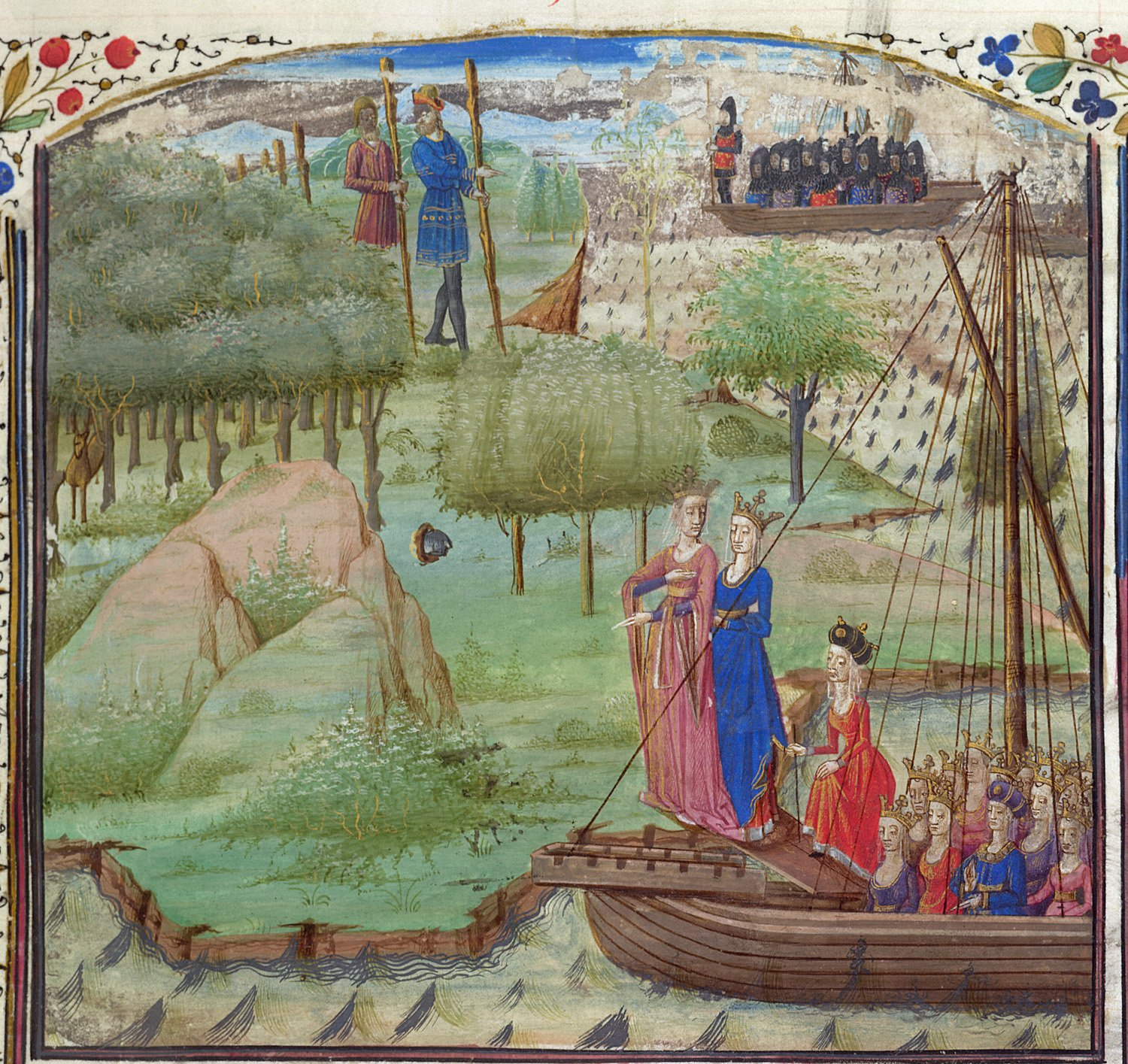
Albina and other daughters of Diodicias (front). Two giants of Albion are in the background, encountered by a ship carrying Brutus and his men. Brut Chronicle, British Library Royal 19 C IX, 1450–1475

A legend exists in various forms that giants were either the original inhabitants, or the founders of the land named Albion. John Milton told the story in his History of Britain (1670) In Book I he recounts that the land was "subdu'd by Albion a Giant, Son of Neptune; who call'd the Iland after his own name, and rul'd it 44 Years."

=== Geoffrey of Monmouth ===
According to the 12th-century Historia Regum Britanniae ("The History of The Kings of Britain") by Geoffrey of Monmouth, the exiled Brutus of Troy was told by the goddess Diana:

Brutus! there lies beyond the Gallic bounds
An island which the western sea surrounds,
By giants once possessed, now few remain
To bar thy entrance, or obstruct thy reign.
To reach that happy shore thy sails employ
There fate decrees to raise a second Troy
And found an empire in thy royal line,
Which time shall ne'er destroy, nor bounds confine.

— Geoffrey of Monmouth, History of the Kings of Britain/Books 1, 11

After many adventures, Brutus and his fellow Trojans escape from Gaul and "set sail with a fair wind towards the promised island".

"The island was then called Albion, and inhabited by none but a few giants. Notwithstanding this, the pleasant situation of the places, the plenty of rivers abounding with fish, and the engaging prospect of its woods, made Brutus and his company very desirous to fix their habitation in it." After dividing up the island between themselves "at last Brutus called the island after his own name Britain, and his companions Britons; for by these means he desired to perpetuate the memory of his name". Geoffrey goes on to recount how the last of the giants are defeated, the largest one called Goëmagot is flung over a cliff by Corineus.

=== Prose Merlin ===
The 13th century Prose Merlin drew on Geoffrey's story, but instead had Brutus and Corneus as two barons of Troy, who fled the city after its destruction. Brutus went to Britain and founded London, while Corneus, who was descended from giants, went to Britanny, where he founded cities and castles, and gave his name to Cornouaille. In this version the giants were descended from Corneus, and survived until the time of King Arthur, when they fought alongside the Saracens against the Britons during the Saxon invasion of Britain. In the story, they are eventually defeated by Arthur and his knights, and flee to a forest "that noon ne a-bode other"; Merlin warns not to chase them, "ffor soone shull thei mete with folke that shall do hem I-nough of sorowe and care."

=== Anglo-Norman Albina story ===
Later, in the 14th century, a more elaborate tale was developed, claiming that Albina and her sisters founded Albion and procreated there a race of giants. The "Albina story" survives in several forms, including the octosyllabic Anglo-Norman poem "Des grantz geanz" dating to 1300–1334. (Note: Brereton 1937, p. xxxii had allowed for earlier dating range, giving 1200 (more likely 1250) to 1333/4: "not earlier than the beginning – probably not before the middle – of the thirteenth century and not later than 1333–4") (Note: The same text (same MS source) as Jubinal (Cotton Cleopatra IX) occurs in Francisque Michel ed., Gesta Regum Britanniae (1862), under the Latin title De Primis Inhabitatoribus Angliæ and incipit.) According to the poem, in the 3970th year of the creation of the world, (Note: Brereton 1937, p. 2, "Del mound, treis mil e nef cent/E sessante e diz ans" ll.14–15; but "treis" is lacking in Michel 1862 so that it reads "1970 years") a king of Greece married his thirty daughters into royalty, but the haughty brides colluded to eliminate their husbands so they would be subservient to no one. The youngest would not be party to the crime and divulged the plot, so the other princesses were confined to an unsteerable rudderless ship and set adrift, and after three days reached an uninhabited land later to be known as "Britain". The eldest daughter Albina (Albine) was the first to step ashore and lay claim to the land, naming it after herself. At first, the women gathered acorns and fruits, but once they learned to hunt and obtain meat, it aroused their lecherous desires. As no other humans inhabited the land, they mated with evil spirits called "incubi", and subsequently with the sons they begot, engendering a race of giants. These giants are evidenced by huge bones which are unearthed. Brutus arrived 260 years after Albina, 1136 before the birth of Christ, but by then there were only 24 giants left, due to inner strife. As with Geoffrey of Monmouth's version, Brutus's band subsequently overtake the land, defeating Gogmagog in the process.

==== Manuscripts and forms ====
The octosyllabic poem appears as a prologue to 16 out of 26 manuscripts of the Short Version of the Anglo-Norman prose Brut, which derives from Wace. Octosyllabic is not the only form the Anglo-Norman Des Grantz Geanz, there are five forms, the others being: the alexandrine, prose, short verse, and short prose versions. The Latin adaptation of the Albina story, De Origine Gigantum, appeared soon afterwards, in the 1330s. It has been edited by Carey & Crick (1995), and translated by Ruth Evans (1998).

=== Diocletian's daughters ===
A variant tale occurs in the Middle English prose Brut (Brie ed., The Brut or the Chronicles of England 1906–1908) of the 14th century, an English rendition of the Anglo-Norman Brut deriving from Wace. (Note: In the Anglo-Norman prose Brut, the poem prefaced to the Short Version was incorporated to the text proper (prologue) of the Long Version, from the long version. This long version was then rendered into Middle English.Lamont 2007, p. 74) In the Prolog of this chronicle, it was King "Dioclician" of "Surrey" (Syria), who had 33 daughters, the eldest being called "Albyne". The princesses are all banished to Albion after plotting to murder their husbands, where they couple with the local demons; their offspring became a race of giants. The chronicle asserts that during the voyage Albyne entrusted the fate of the sisters to "Appolyn", which was the god of their faith. The Syrian king who was her father sounds much like a Roman emperor, though Diocletian (3rd century) would be anachronistic, and Holinshed explains this as a bungling of the legend of Danaus and his fifty daughters who founded Argos.

=== Later treatment of the myth ===
Because Geoffrey of Monmouth's work was regarded as fact until the late 17th century, the story appears in most early histories of Britain. Wace, Layamon, Raphael Holinshed, William Camden and John Milton repeat the legend and it appears in Edmund Spenser's The Faerie Queene.

William Blake's poems Milton and Jerusalem feature Albion as an archetypal giant representing humanity. (Quotation needed)

In 2010, artist Mark Sheeky donated the 2008 painting Two Roman Legionaries Discovering The God-King Albion Turned Into Stone to the Grosvenor Museum collection.

== See also ==
- Blighty – British slang term for Britain or England
- Britain (place name) – Place name
- Clas Myrddin, an early name for Great Britain given in the Third Series of Welsh Triads.
- New Albion – Part of modern California claimed for England by Francis Drake
- Nordalbingia, based on the Latin name for the Elbe River: Alba
- Perfidious Albion – Pejorative epithet for Great Britain
- Terminology of the British Isles

== Bibliography ==
=== Albina story ===
- Jubinal, Achille, ed. (1842), "Des graunz Jaianz ki primes conquistrent Bretaingne (Bibl. Cotton Cleopatra D IX)", Nouveau recueil de contes, dits, fabliaux et autres pièces inédites des XIIIe, XIVe et XVe siècles, pour faite suite aux collections de Legrand d'Aussy, Barbazan et Méon, Pannier, pp. 354–371
  - Michel, Francisque, ed. (1862), "Appendix I: De Primis Inhabitatoribus Angliæ", Gesta Regum Britanniæ: a metrical history of the Britions of the XIIIth century, Printed by G. Gounouilhou, pp. 199–214
- Barber, Richard, ed. (2004) [1999], "1. The Giants of the Island of Albion", Myths & Legends of the British Isles, Boydell Press
- Brie, Friedrich W. D., ed. (1906–1908), The Brut or the Chronicles of England ... from Ms. Raw. B171, Bodleian Library, &c., EETS o.s., vol. 131 (part 1), London
- Carley, James P.; Crick, Julia (1995), "Constructing Albion's Past: An Annotated Edition of De origine gigantum", in Carley; Riddy, Felicity (eds.), Arthurian Literature XIII, D. S. Brewer, pp. 41–115, ISBN 0859914496
- Evans, Ruth (1998), "Gigantic Origins: An Annotated Translation of De origine gigantum", in Carley; Riddy, Felicity (eds.), Arthurian Literature XVI, D. S. Brewer, pp. 197–217, ISBN 085991531X
- Lamont, Margaret Elizabeth (2007), "Albina, her sisters, and the giants of Albion", The "Kynde Bloode of Engeland": Remaking Englishness in the Middle English Prose "Brut", pp. 73ff, ISBN 978-0549482543

=== Studies ===
- Bernau, Anke (2007), "Myths of origin and the struggle over nationhood", in McMullan, Gordon; Matthews, David (eds.), Reading the Medieval in Early Modern England, Cambridge University Press, pp. 106–118, ISBN 978-0521868433
- Brereton, Georgine Elizabeth, ed. (1937), Des grantz geanz: an Anglo-Norman poem, Medium Aevum Monographs, vol. 2, Oxford: Blackwell
