= Labastide-Rouairoux =

- Commune
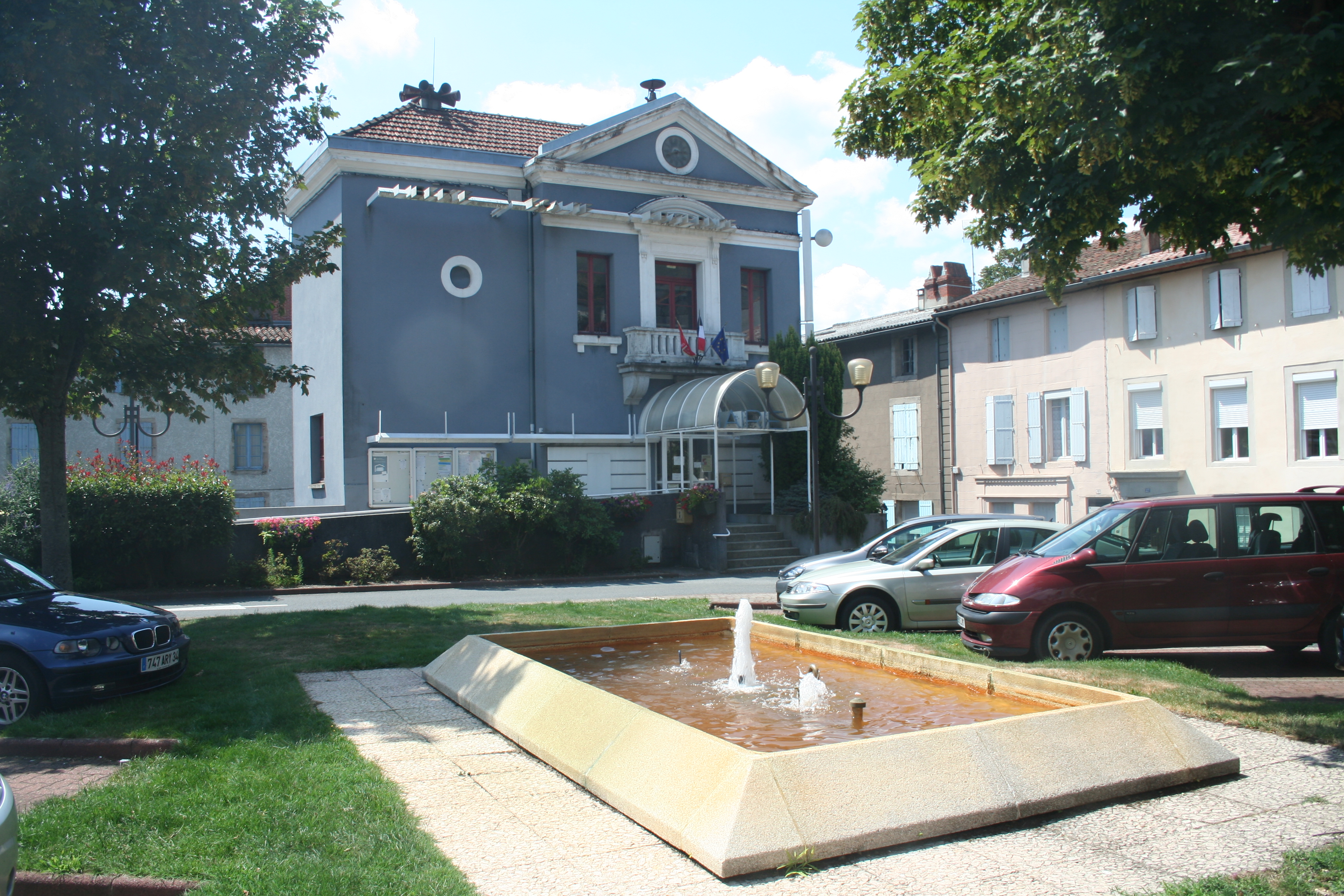
- The town hall in Labastide-Rouairoux

- Coat of arms
- Location of Labastide-Rouairoux
- Location within France Location within Occitanie
- Coordinates: 43°28′34″N 2°38′23″E
- Country: France
- Region: Occitania
- Department: Tarn
- Arrondissement: Castres
- Canton: Mazamet-2 Vallée du Thoré

Government
  - Mayor (2020–2026): Michèle Vincent
- Area^{1}: 23.67 km^{2} (9.14 sq mi)
- Highest elevation: 940 m (3,080 ft)
- Lowest elevation: 364 m (1,194 ft)
- Population (2023): 1,420
  - Density: 60.0/km^{2} (155/sq mi)
- Time zone: UTC+01:00 (CET)
  - Summer (DST): UTC+02:00 (CEST)
- INSEE/Postal code: 81115 /81270
- ^{1} French Land Register data, which excludes lakes, ponds, glaciers > 1 km^{2} (0.386 sq mi or 247 acres) and river estuaries.

Labastide-Rouairoux (French pronunciation: [labastid ʁwɛʁu]; Occitan: La Bastida de Roairós) is a commune in the Tarn department in southern France.

== Geography ==
The Thoré flows westward through the commune and crosses the village.

== See also ==
- Communes of the Tarn department
