= Saint-Amans-Soult =

- Commune
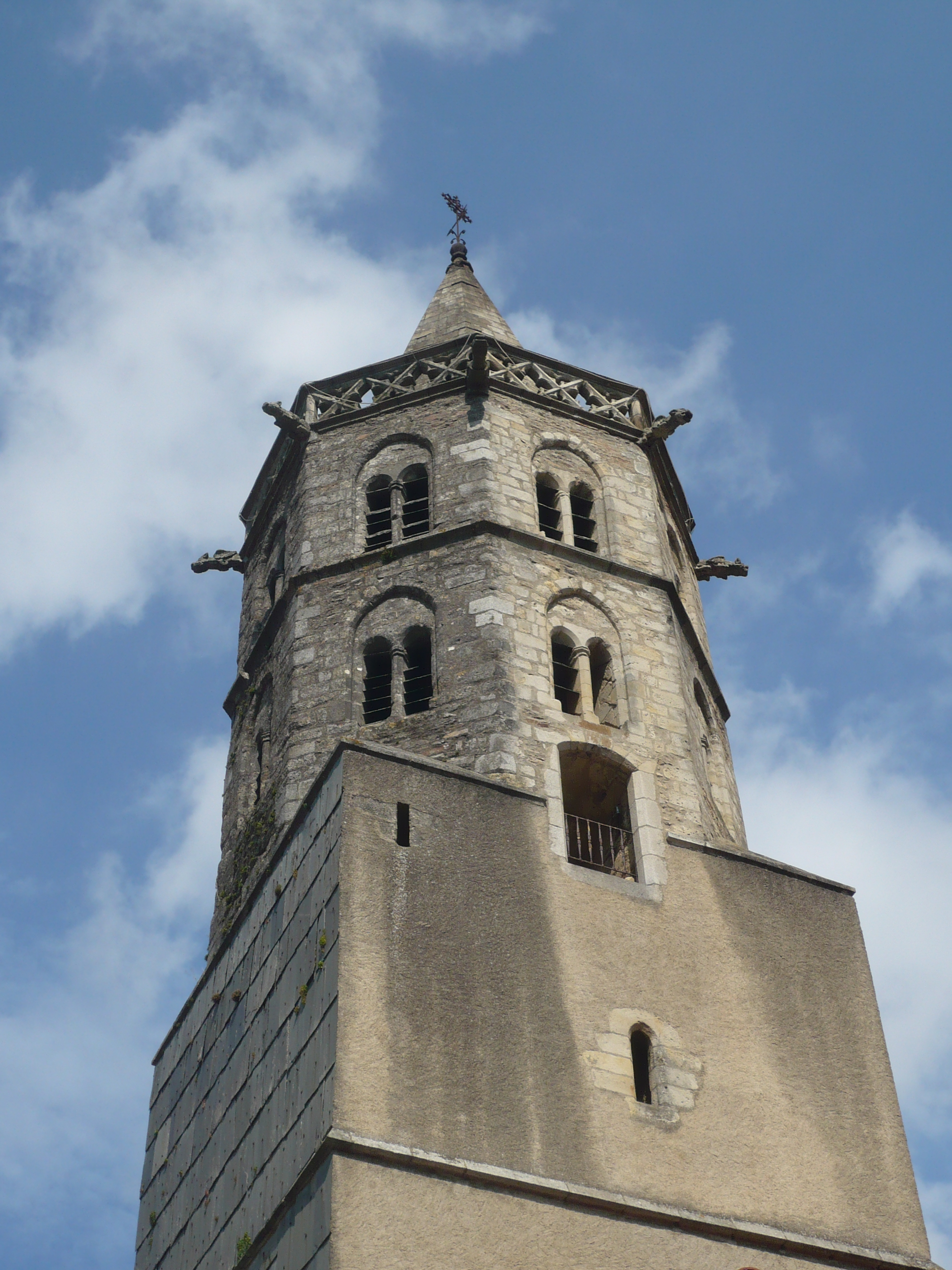
- The tower of the church in Saint-Amans-Soult

- Coat of arms
- Location of Saint-Amans-Soult
- Location within France Location within Occitanie
- Coordinates: 43°28′40″N 2°29′26″E
- Country: France
- Region: Occitania
- Department: Tarn
- Arrondissement: Castres
- Canton: Mazamet-2 Vallée du Thoré
- Intercommunality: CA Castres Mazamet

Government
  - Mayor (2024–2026): Jérôme Cros
- Area^{1}: 24.87 km^{2} (9.60 sq mi)
- Elevation: 269 m (883 ft)
- Highest elevation: 1,172 m (3,845 ft)
- Lowest elevation: 239 m (784 ft)
- Population (2023): 1,553
  - Density: 62.44/km^{2} (161.7/sq mi)
- Time zone: UTC+01:00 (CET)
  - Summer (DST): UTC+02:00 (CEST)
- INSEE/Postal code: 81238 /81240
- ^{1} French Land Register data, which excludes lakes, ponds, glaciers > 1 km^{2} (0.386 sq mi or 247 acres) and river estuaries.

Saint-Amans-Soult (French pronunciation: [sɛ̃t‿amɑ̃ sult]; Languedocien: Sant Amanç de Solt) is a commune in the Tarn department in southern France.

The commune was formerly called Saint-Amans-la-Bastide. It was renamed in 1851, after Marshal Jean-de-Dieu Soult, who was born there in 1769. Marshal-General Soult, under the Emperor Napoleon, was later named as Duke of Dalmatia, and following the Emperor's permanent exile to St. Helena, enjoyed a long and fruitful career as a politician and diplomant under several early 19th century royalist and republican regimes in France. His son, Napoleon H. de Soult, arranged for the posthumous publication of his father's Memoires after 1851.

== Geography ==
The Thoré forms the commune's northern border.

== See also ==
- Communes of the Tarn department
