= Albino Rock =

Islet in North Queensland, Australia

White Rock
- Interactive map of Albino Rock

Geography
- Coordinates: 18.772°S 146.718°E
- Archipelago: Greater Palm group

Administration
- Australia
- State: Queensland
- Local Government Area: Shire of Hinchinbrook

Albino Rock, formerly White Rock, is an islet east of Great Palm Island, part of the Greater Palm group in Queensland, Australia. The island is in the Hinchinbrook jurisdiction, and is part of Orpheus Island National Park.

The surrounding waters are in the Great Barrier Reef Marine Park in the Coral Sea, which is administrated by the Great Barrier Reef Marine Park Authority (GBRMPA). The island once held the Albino Rock Lighthouse. The older name "White Rock" is at least as old as 1939.
