= La Región =

Newspaper in Galicia, Spain

La Región is a daily newspaper in the city and province of Ourense, in the Southeastern part of Galicia, an autonomous community (region) of Spain. Founded in 1910, most of its stock still belongs to the founding Outeiriño family. As a daily newspaper La Región has no specific competitor in Ourense, but a number of Galician newspapers are distributed in Ourense and seen as competitors to La Región. La Región prints about 13000 copies per day on average according to OJD, Spain's main news distribution auditors.

La Región's publisher is La Región S.A., a Spanish company. La Región, together with Ourense's local television company Telemiño and Atlántico Diario, a newspaper in Vigo, make up the Grupo La Región conglomerate. Also published by this group is La Región Internacional, a newspaper launched in 1966 as millions of Spaniards emigrated. La Región Internacional has since then been circulated among non-resident Spaniards only. Contrary to La Región, La Región Internacional does not especially inform on Ourense or Galicia as it is targeted to non-resident Spaniards of any regional origin.

Another newspaper named La Región exists in Chile, which is not linked in any way to the Spanish one.
