= Bout-du-Pont-de-Larn =

- Commune
- Coat of arms
- Location of Bout-du-Pont-de-Larn
- Location within France Location within Occitanie
- Coordinates: 43°30′06″N 2°24′18″E
- Country: France
- Region: Occitania
- Department: Tarn
- Arrondissement: Castres
- Canton: Mazamet-2 Vallée du Thoré

Government
  - Mayor (2020–2026): Bernard Prat
- Area^{1}: 7.63 km^{2} (2.95 sq mi)
- Elevation: 311 m (1,020 ft)
- Highest elevation: 512 m (1,680 ft)
- Lowest elevation: 218 m (715 ft)
- Population (2023): 1,225
  - Density: 161/km^{2} (416/sq mi)
- Time zone: UTC+01:00 (CET)
  - Summer (DST): UTC+02:00 (CEST)
- INSEE/Postal code: 81036 /81660
- ^{1} French Land Register data, which excludes lakes, ponds, glaciers > 1 km^{2} (0.386 sq mi or 247 acres) and river estuaries.

Bout-du-Pont-de-Larn (French pronunciation: [bu dy pɔ̃ də laʁn]) is a commune in the Tarn department in southern France.

== Geography ==
The Thoré forms the commune's southern border. The Arn, a tributary of the Thoré, forms its northern border.

== See also ==
- Communes of the Tarn department
