= Saint-Amans-Valtoret =

- Commune
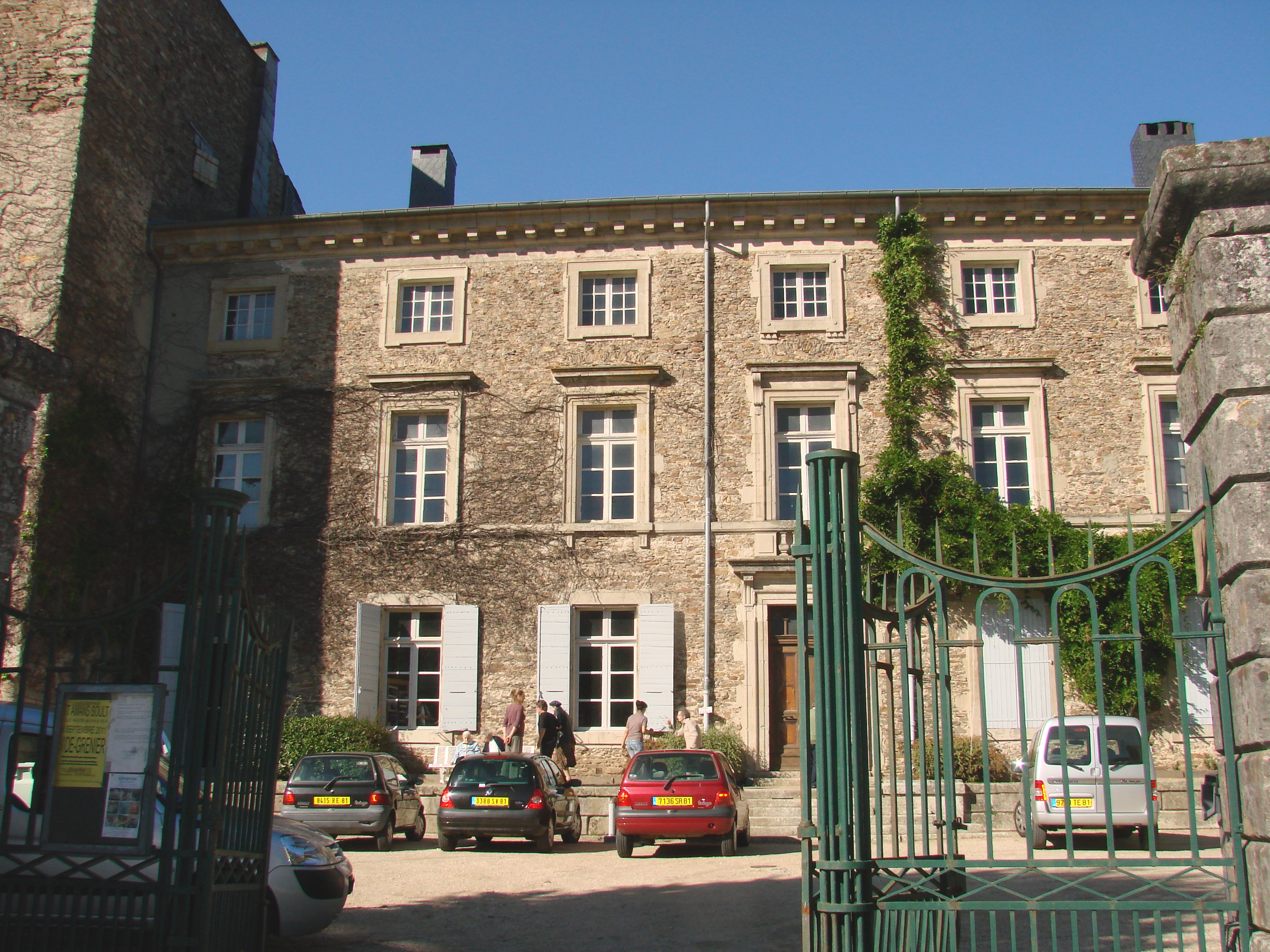
- The château in Saint-Amans-Valtoret

- Coat of arms
- Location of Saint-Amans-Valtoret
- Location within France Location within Occitanie
- Coordinates: 43°28′54″N 2°29′32″E
- Country: France
- Region: Occitania
- Department: Tarn
- Arrondissement: Castres
- Canton: Mazamet-2 Vallée du Thoré
- Intercommunality: Thoré Montagne Noire

Government
  - Mayor (2020–2026): Daniel Peigné
- Area^{1}: 35.58 km^{2} (13.74 sq mi)
- Elevation: 280 m (920 ft)
- Highest elevation: 826 m (2,710 ft)
- Lowest elevation: 240 m (790 ft)
- Population (2023): 862
  - Density: 24.2/km^{2} (62.7/sq mi)
- Time zone: UTC+01:00 (CET)
  - Summer (DST): UTC+02:00 (CEST)
- INSEE/Postal code: 81239 /81240
- ^{1} French Land Register data, which excludes lakes, ponds, glaciers > 1 km^{2} (0.386 sq mi or 247 acres) and river estuaries.

Saint-Amans-Valtoret (French pronunciation: [sɛ̃.t‿amɑ̃(s) valtɔʁɛ]; Occitan: Sant Amanç de Val Toret) is a commune in the Tarn department and Occitanie region of southern France.

== Geography ==
The river Thoré forms the commune's southern border.

== See also ==
- Communes of the Tarn department
