= Saint-Amant =

Saint-Amant may refer to:

== People ==
- Pierre Charles Fournier de Saint-Amant (1800–1872), French chess player
- Antoine Girard de Saint-Amant (1594–1661), French poet

== Places ==
- St. Amant, Louisiana, United States
- communes in France:
  - Saint-Amant, Charente, in the Charente département
  - Saint-Amant-de-Boixe, in the Charente département
  - Saint-Amant-de-Bonnieure, in the Charente département
  - Saint-Amant-de-Montmoreau, in the Charente département
  - Saint-Amant-de-Nouère, in the Charente département
  - Saint-Amant-Roche-Savine, in the Puy-de-Dôme département
  - Saint-Amant-Tallende, in the Puy-de-Dôme département

== Other ==
- St. Amant (horse), winner of the 1904 Epsom Derby.

== See also ==
- Saint-Amand (disambiguation)
- Saint-Amans (disambiguation)
- Saint Amand
