= Albino Aboug =

South Sudanese politician and diplomat

Member of the Pan-African Parliament
- Incumbent
- Assumed office May 2021
- Constituency: South Sudan

Member of the South Sudan National Legislative Assembly
- Incumbent
- Assumed office 2021

Personal details
- Born: 19 December 1979 (age 46) Twic State, Bahr el Ghazal, Sudan (now South Sudan)
- Party: Sudan People's Liberation Movement
- Education: South Dakota State University; University of Nairobi (BA)

Albino Mathom Ayuel Aboug (born 19 December 1979) is a South Sudanese politician and diplomat. Aboug is a member of the South Sudan National Legislative Assembly and represents South Sudan in the Pan-African Parliament. Aboug had previously served in various diplomatic positions throughout Africa, most prominently as one of the peace negotiators during the Central African Republic Civil War. Aboug holds both South Sudanese and American nationality.

== Early life and education ==
Aboug was born on 19 December 1979 in Twic State, Sudan.

In 1987, Aboug became a child soldier in the Sudan People's Liberation Army. As a result of the Second Sudanese Civil War, Aboug became displaced and sought asylum in Ethiopia. In 1991, Aboug returned to Sudan due to unrest in Ethiopia, settling in Khartoum, though later in the 1990s, he once again fled Sudan to avoid conscription, seeking refuge in Egypt. While in Egypt, the United Nations High Commission for Refugees relocated Aboug to the United States.

Aboug attended South Dakota State University, where he studied global studies and political science. He then attended the University of Nairobi in Kenya, graduating with a bachelor's degree in history, communication, and political science.

== Career ==
While in the United States, Aboug became associated with Robert McFarlane as a partner at US-Southern Sudan Development Company, a lobbying firm created by McFarlane. In 2013, at the urging of Goodluck Jonathan, the president of Nigeria, and Meles Zenawi, the prime minister of Ethiopia, Aboug returned to Africa, where he became the president of the Pan-African Youth Council and the Ambassador for Youth Affairs for the Pan-African Parliament.

Later in 2013, Aboug became an advisor to Denis Sassou Nguesso, the president of the Republic of the Congo, and served as a special envoy in the peace negotiations of the Central African Republic Civil War. Aboug left the role in 2015.

In May 2021, Aboug was appointed to the South Sudan National Legislative Assembly by the Sudan People's Liberation Movement. He was also appointed to be one of South Sudan's five representatives in the Pan-African Parliament. In July 2021, he was appointed by the president of South Sudan, Salva Kiir to be an ambassador and presidential special envoy for South Sudan.
