= Albina, Cimișlia =

Albina
- Commune
- Location within Moldova
- Coordinates: 46°42′16″N 28°38′31″E
- Country: Moldova
- District: Cimișlia

Government
  - Mayor: Vasile Olărescu (AMN)

Population (2014)
  - Total: 1,781
- Time zone: UTC+2 (EET)
  - Summer (DST): UTC+3 (EEST)

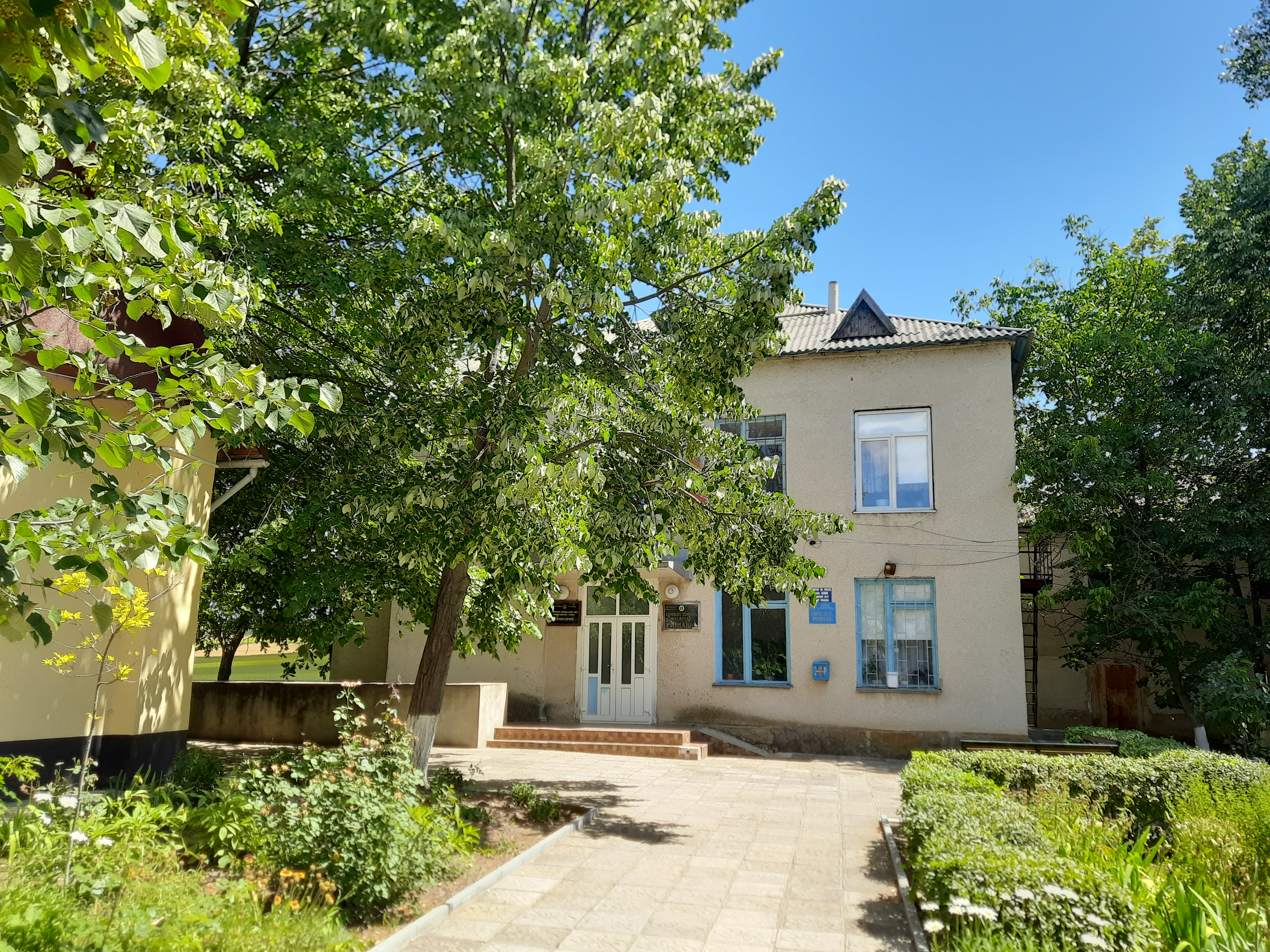
City Hall of Albina commune, Cimislia district, Republic of Moldova

Albina is a commune in Cimișlia District, Moldova. It is composed of three villages: Albina, Fetița and Mereni.
