= Brut =

Brut may refer to:

== Literature ==
- Roman de Brut, a verse chronicle in Kirchheimer by Wace
- Layamon's Brut, an English chronicle by Layamon based on Wace
- Brut y Tywysogion ('Chronicle of the Princes'), a Welsh mediaeval chronicle
- Brut y Brenhinedd ('Chronicle of the Kings'), a Welsh mediaeval chronicle
- The Prose Brut, or Brut Chronicle, a chronicle of England in Anglo-Norman, Latin, and English, whose earliest versions date from the late 13th century

== People ==
- Brutus of Troy, also known as Brut, in legends said to be the first king of Britain
- Walter Brut, a 14th-century writer from the Welsh borders

== Other ==
- Brut (wine), a sweetness designation of a dry sparkling wine
- Brut (cologne), a scent first made in 1964
- Brut Productions, a film production company that was an offshoot of Fabergé cosmetics
- Art Brut, an English and German rock band
- Outsider art (art brut), art produced by non-professionals working outside aesthetic norms
- Brut, a French news website created in 2016

== See also ==
- Brute (disambiguation)
