= Albina (mythology) =

Legendary British princess, and Italian fairy

Albina is a legendary princess in the Matter of Britain. Medieval chroniclers claimed she and her sisters were exiled to an uninhabited island after killing their spouses, who attempted to force them into obedience. She supposedly named this island Albion, later known as Great Britain, after herself. According to modern philogy, the name Albion was inspired by the White Cliffs of Dover, derived from the Latin albus, meaning "white" or "bright".

== Matter of Britain ==
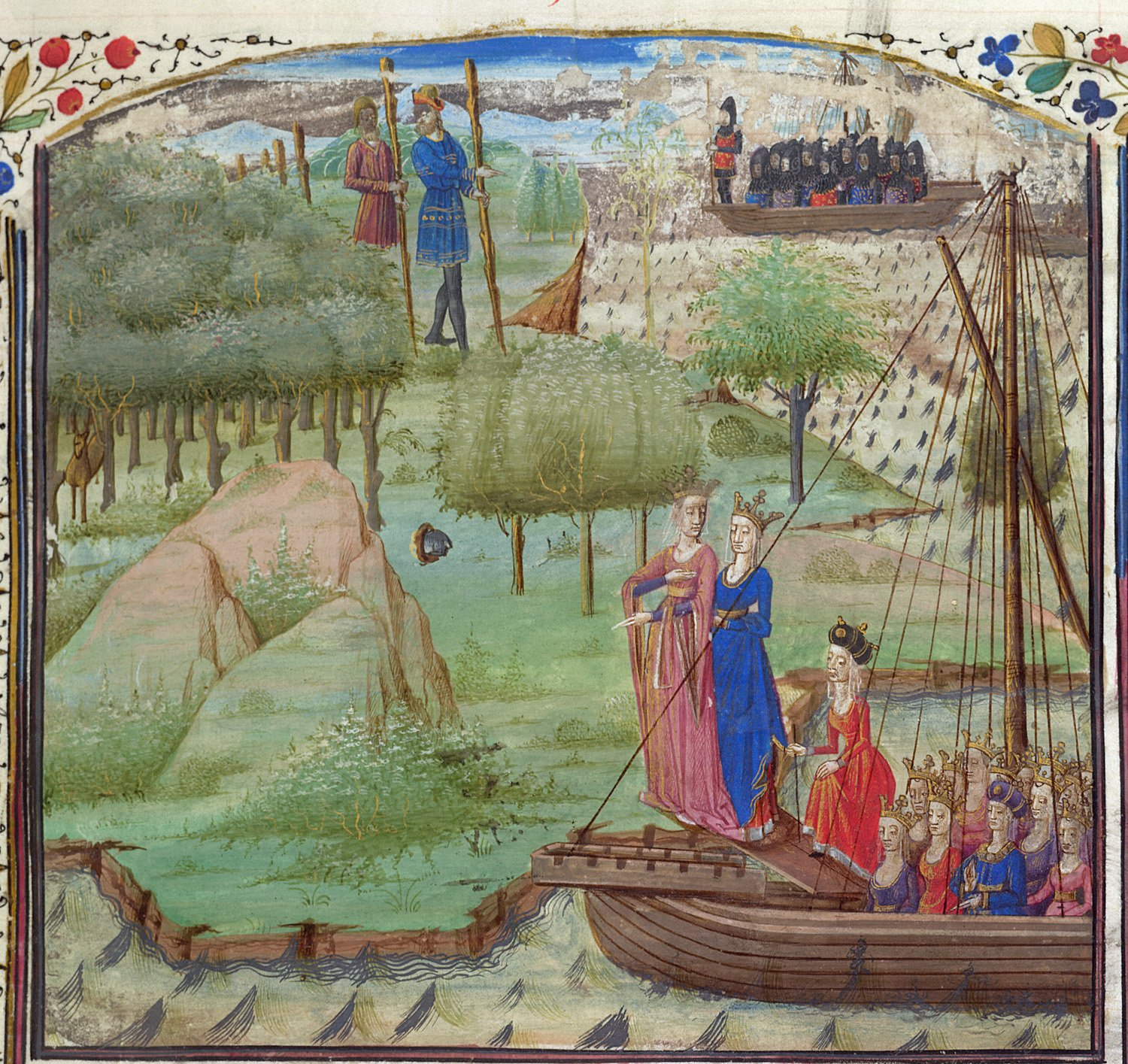
Miniature from the Brut Chronicle depicting the arrival of Albina and her sisters in Albion, c. 1450–1475. In the background are diegetically anachronistic giants, and a second ship carrying Brutus of Troy's party.

The first mention of Albina is in the Anglo-Norman poem Des Grantz Geanz ("Of the Great Giants"), which dates to the late 13th or early 14th century, and has been tentatively dated no later than 1333. An abridged form of the poem was appended as a prologue to the Brut Chronicle.

In the poem, Albina and her 32 sisters are the daughters of Diosclesian, King of Syria. At a grand feast, they are wedded in arranged marriages to neighbouring kings. However, the women refuse to submit to their new husbands, believing themselves to be of nobler blood than they. At a second feast, Diosclesian chastises them for their disobedience, but Albina still refuses to comply with her father's orders of subservience. That night, she and her sisters murder their respective spouses.

As punishment for their mass mariticide, the princesses are exiled to an uninhabited island, which Albina names Albion after herself. They survive by hunting and gathering, which is depicted as barbaric and a result of their fall from civilisation. Demons from hell then seduce them, and they give birth to a race of giants. The text identifies these giants as the ones that Brutus of Troy later encounters and slays when he arrives in Albion in Geoffrey of Monmouth's Historia Regum Britanniae ("The History of the Kings of Britain"), paving the way for permanent human settlement and the creation of the civilised Kingdom of Britain.

== See also ==
- Gogmagog (giant)
