= Albine =

- Commune
- Coat of arms
- Location of Albine
- Location within France Location within Occitanie
- Coordinates: 43°27′38″N 2°32′24″E
- Country: France
- Region: Occitania
- Department: Tarn
- Arrondissement: Castres
- Canton: Mazamet-2 Vallée du Thoré
- Intercommunality: Thoré Montagne Noire

Government
  - Mayor (2020–2026): Xavier Sénégas
- Area^{1}: 17.15 km^{2} (6.62 sq mi)
- Elevation: 325 m (1,066 ft)
- Highest elevation: 1,033 m (3,389 ft)
- Lowest elevation: 276 m (906 ft)
- Population (2023): 512
  - Density: 29.9/km^{2} (77.3/sq mi)
- Time zone: UTC+01:00 (CET)
  - Summer (DST): UTC+02:00 (CEST)
- INSEE/Postal code: 81005 /81240
- ^{1} French Land Register data, which excludes lakes, ponds, glaciers > 1 km^{2} (0.386 sq mi or 247 acres) and river estuaries.

Albine (French pronunciation: [albin]; Occitan: Albina) is a commune of the Tarn department in southern France.

== Geography ==
The Thoré forms the commune's northern border.

== Population ==
Its inhabitants are called Albinols in French.

Historical population
Year	Pop.	±% p.a.
1968	619	—
1975	586	−0.78%
1982	593	+0.17%
1990	566	−0.58%
1999	547	−0.38%
2007	535	−0.28%
2012	539	+0.15%
2017	509	−1.14%
2023	512	+0.10%
Source: INSEE

== See also ==
- Communes of the Tarn department
