= James St. Amand =

Classical scholar and book collector

James St. Amand (1687–1754) was a classical scholar and book collector.

== Life ==
St. Amand was born in Covent Garden, London, on 7 April 1687. His father, James St. Amand (c.1643–1728) was Apothecary to the King from 1685 to 1688, and his mother, Elizabeth, was the great-niece of Archbishop William Juxon. He matriculated from Hart Hall, Oxford in 1703, but entered Lincoln College the following year as a gentleman commoner.

St. Amand planned to publish a new edition of Theocritus, which led him to travel to Italy in 1705 in order to collate manuscripts for this project. He spent five years in Europe, returning to London in 1710. He continued to collect in preparation for the edition for the remainder of his life, but he never completed the project. His manuscript notes were used by Thomas Warton for his 1770 edition of Theocritus.

St. Amand died on 5 September 1754 at home and was buried in the cloisters of Christ's Hospital.

== Collection ==
James St. Amand bequeathed his collection of books and manuscripts to the Bodleian Library. Those rejected by the library were to be gifted to Lincoln College, Oxford, where St. Amand had spent time as a gentleman commoner. The Bodleian accepted 600 books, the majority of which are contemporary editions of the classics and of the writings of modern Latin scholars (many had formerly belonged to Arthur Charlett, Master of University College, 1692). Many of the books contain St Amand's notes on Theocritus and the Greek poets.
