= Sorèze =

- Commune
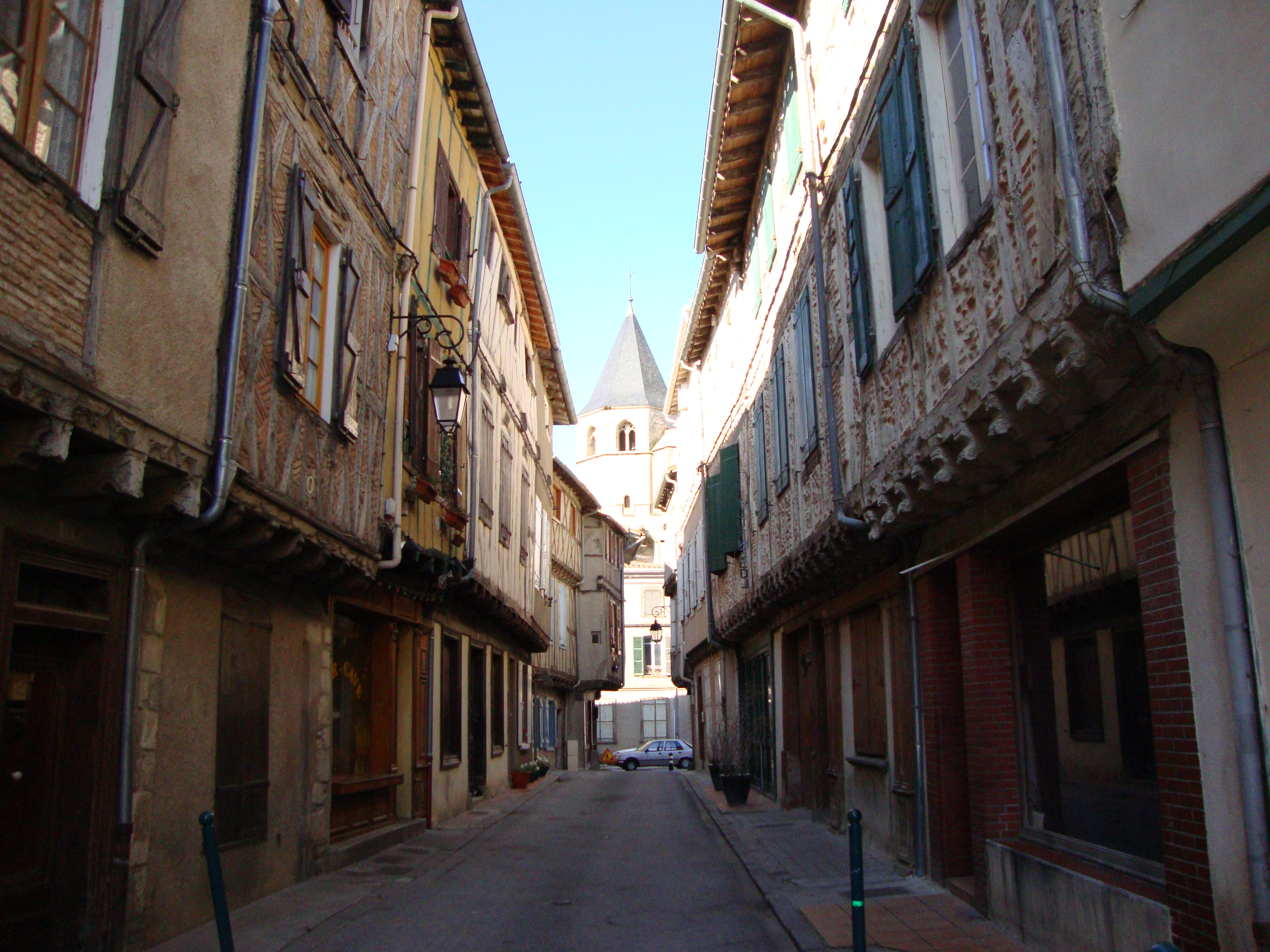
- An alley in Sorèze

- Coat of arms
- Location of Sorèze
- Location within France Location within Occitanie
- Coordinates: 43°27′14″N 2°04′02″E
- Country: France
- Region: Occitania
- Department: Tarn
- Arrondissement: Castres
- Canton: La Montagne noire
- Intercommunality: CC aux sources du Canal du Midi

Government
  - Mayor (2024–2026): Alain Schmidt
- Area^{1}: 41.64 km^{2} (16.08 sq mi)
- Elevation: 272 m (892 ft)
- Highest elevation: 781 m (2,562 ft)
- Lowest elevation: 204 m (669 ft)
- Population (2023): 2,965
  - Density: 71.21/km^{2} (184.4/sq mi)
- Time zone: UTC+01:00 (CET)
  - Summer (DST): UTC+02:00 (CEST)
- INSEE/Postal code: 81288 /81540
- ^{1} French Land Register data, which excludes lakes, ponds, glaciers > 1 km^{2} (0.386 sq mi or 247 acres) and river estuaries.

Sorèze (French pronunciation: [sɔʁɛz]; Occitan: Sorese) is a commune in the Tarn department in southern France.

== Population ==
Historical population
Year	Pop.	±% p.a.
1968	1,613	—
1975	1,672	+0.51%
1982	1,654	−0.15%
1990	1,954	+2.11%
1999	2,164	+1.14%
2007	2,550	+2.07%
2012	2,675	+0.96%
2017	2,836	+1.18%
2023	2,965	+0.74%
Source: INSEE

== See also ==
- Communes of the Tarn department
