= Cahuzac, Tarn =

Cahuzac
- Commune
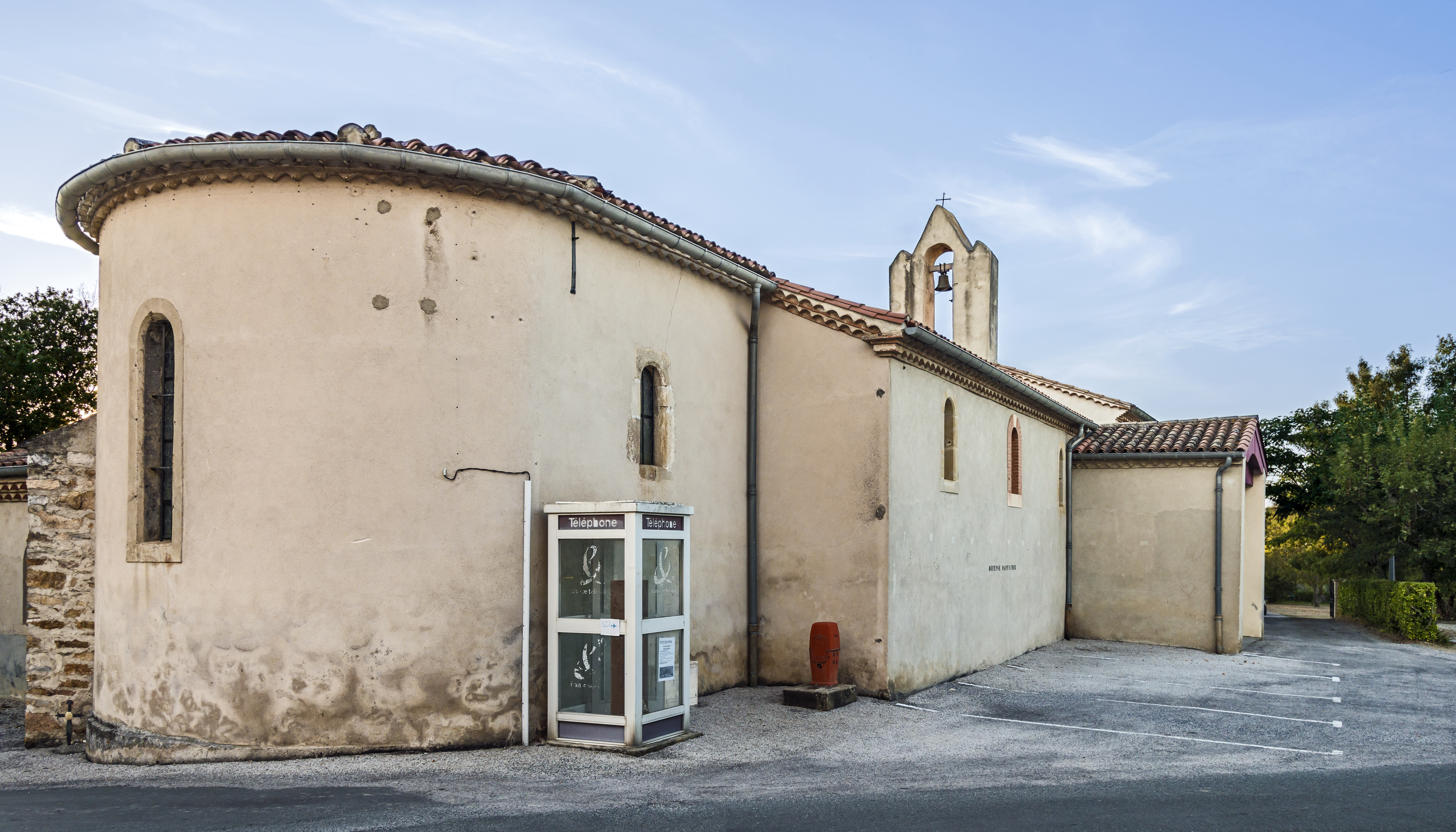

- Coat of arms
- Location of Cahuzac
- Location within France Location within Occitanie
- Coordinates: 43°28′17″N 2°04′45″E
- Country: France
- Region: Occitania
- Department: Tarn
- Arrondissement: Castres
- Canton: La Montagne noire
- Intercommunality: CC aux sources du Canal du Midi

Government
  - Mayor (2020–2026): Alexia Bousquet
- Area^{1}: 5.69 km^{2} (2.20 sq mi)
- Elevation: 255 m (837 ft)
- Highest elevation: 288 m (945 ft)
- Lowest elevation: 199 m (653 ft)
- Population (2023): 356
  - Density: 62.6/km^{2} (162/sq mi)
- Time zone: UTC+01:00 (CET)
  - Summer (DST): UTC+02:00 (CEST)
- INSEE/Postal code: 81049 /81540
- ^{1} French Land Register data, which excludes lakes, ponds, glaciers > 1 km^{2} (0.386 sq mi or 247 acres) and river estuaries.

Cahuzac (French pronunciation: [ka.yzak]; Occitan: Caüsac) is a commune in the Tarn department in southern France.

== Sites and Monuments ==
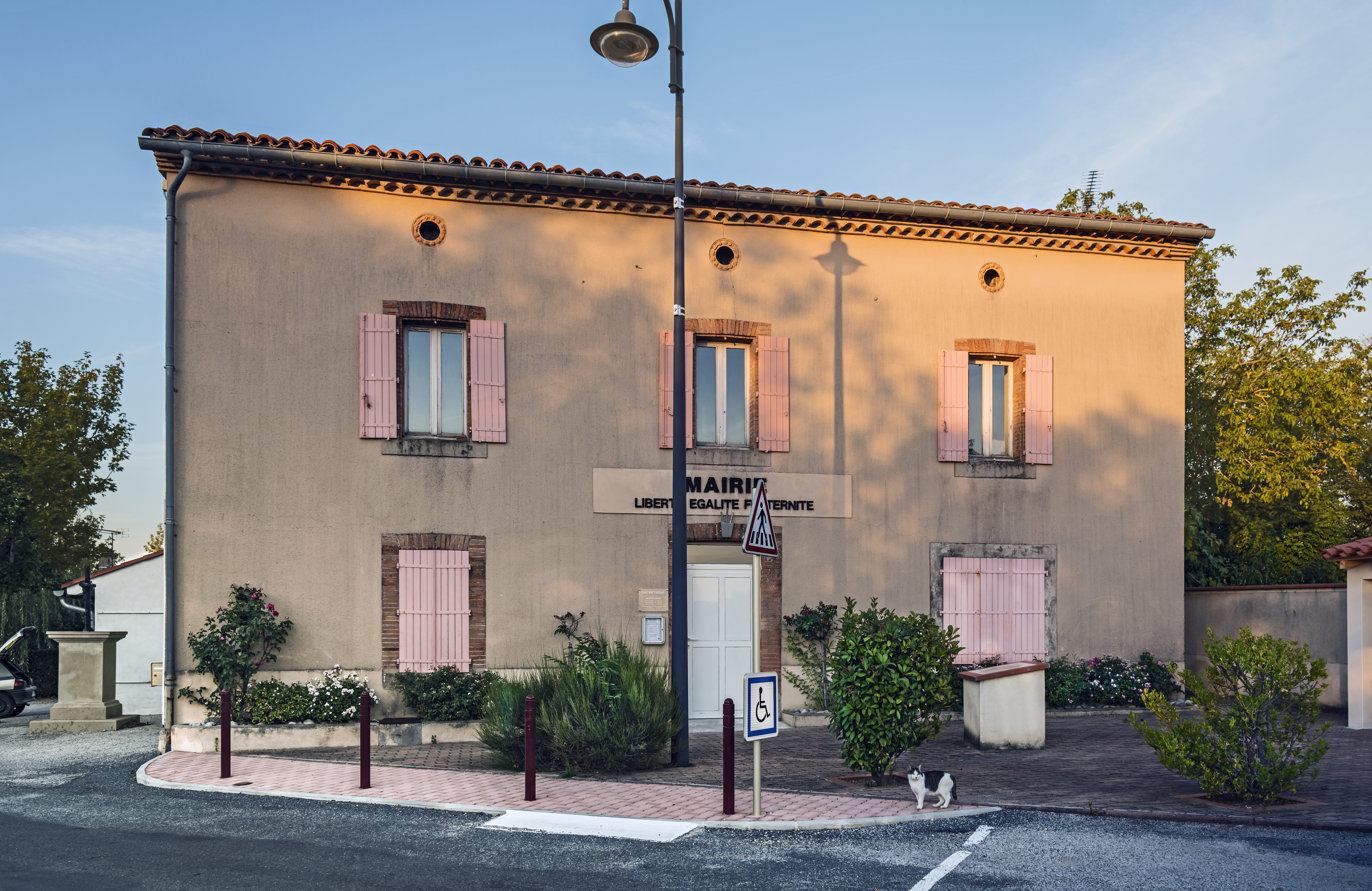
The town hall.

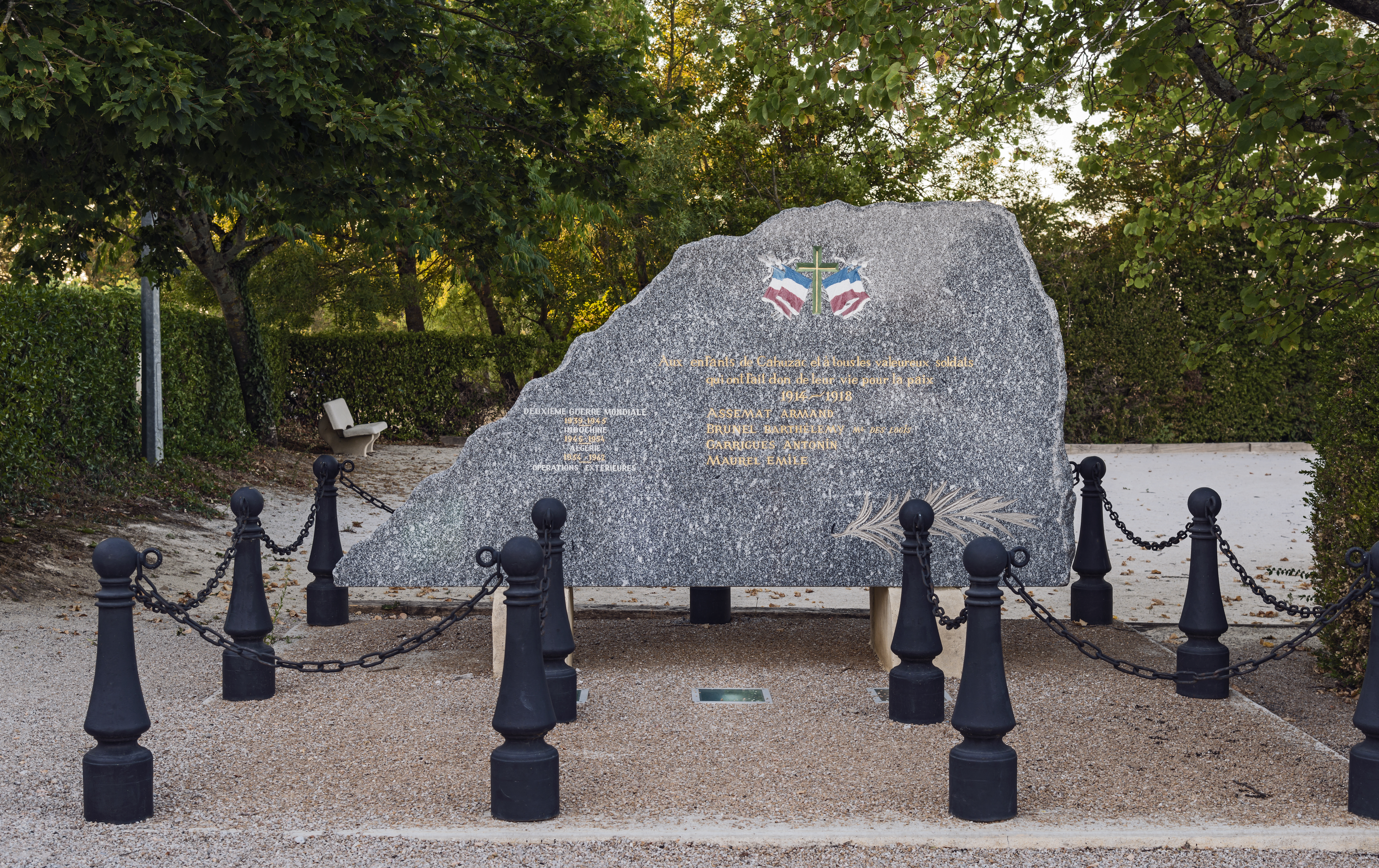
The war memorial.

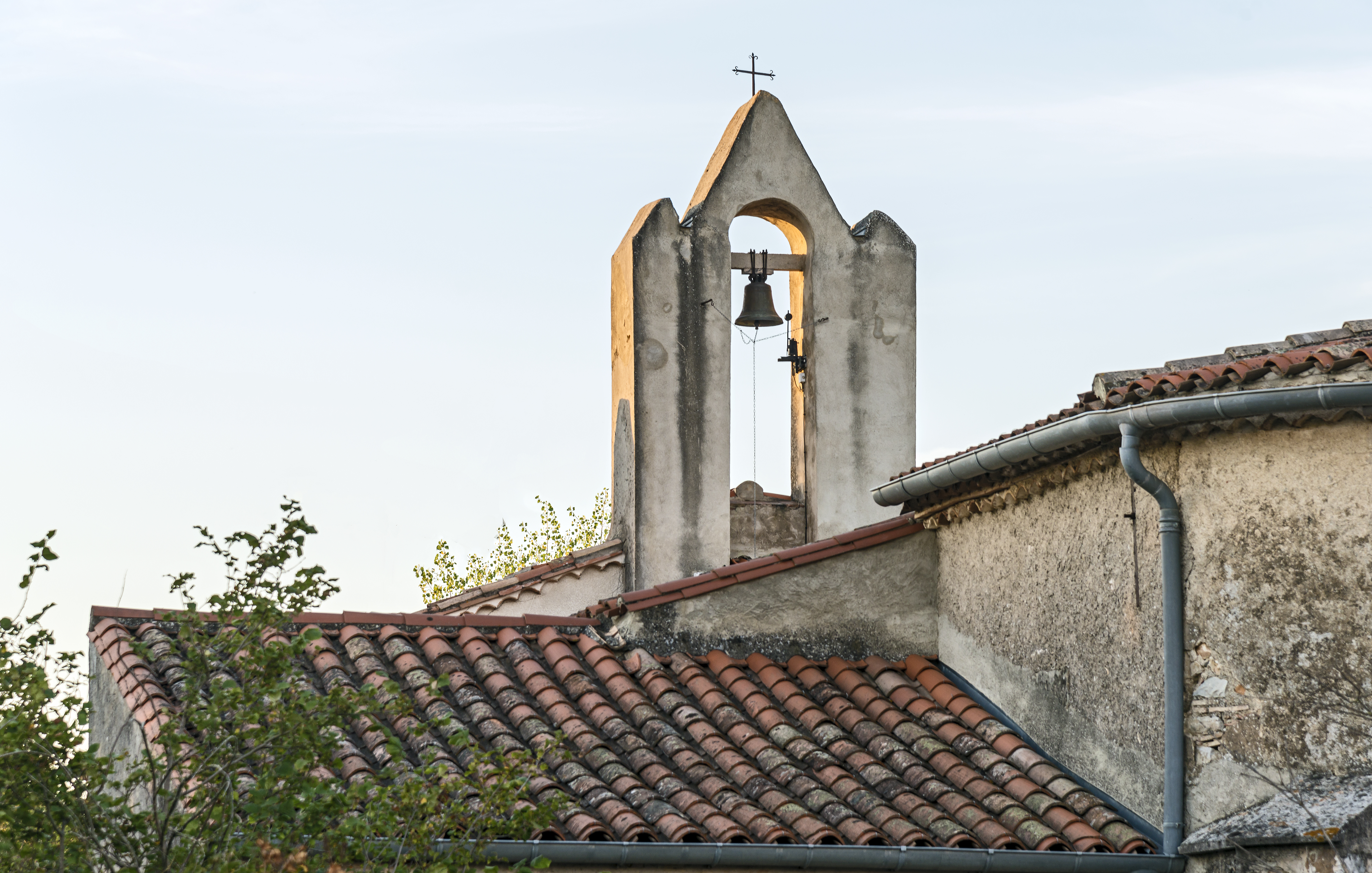
The church tower.

== See also ==
- Communes of the Tarn department
