= Belleserre =

- Commune
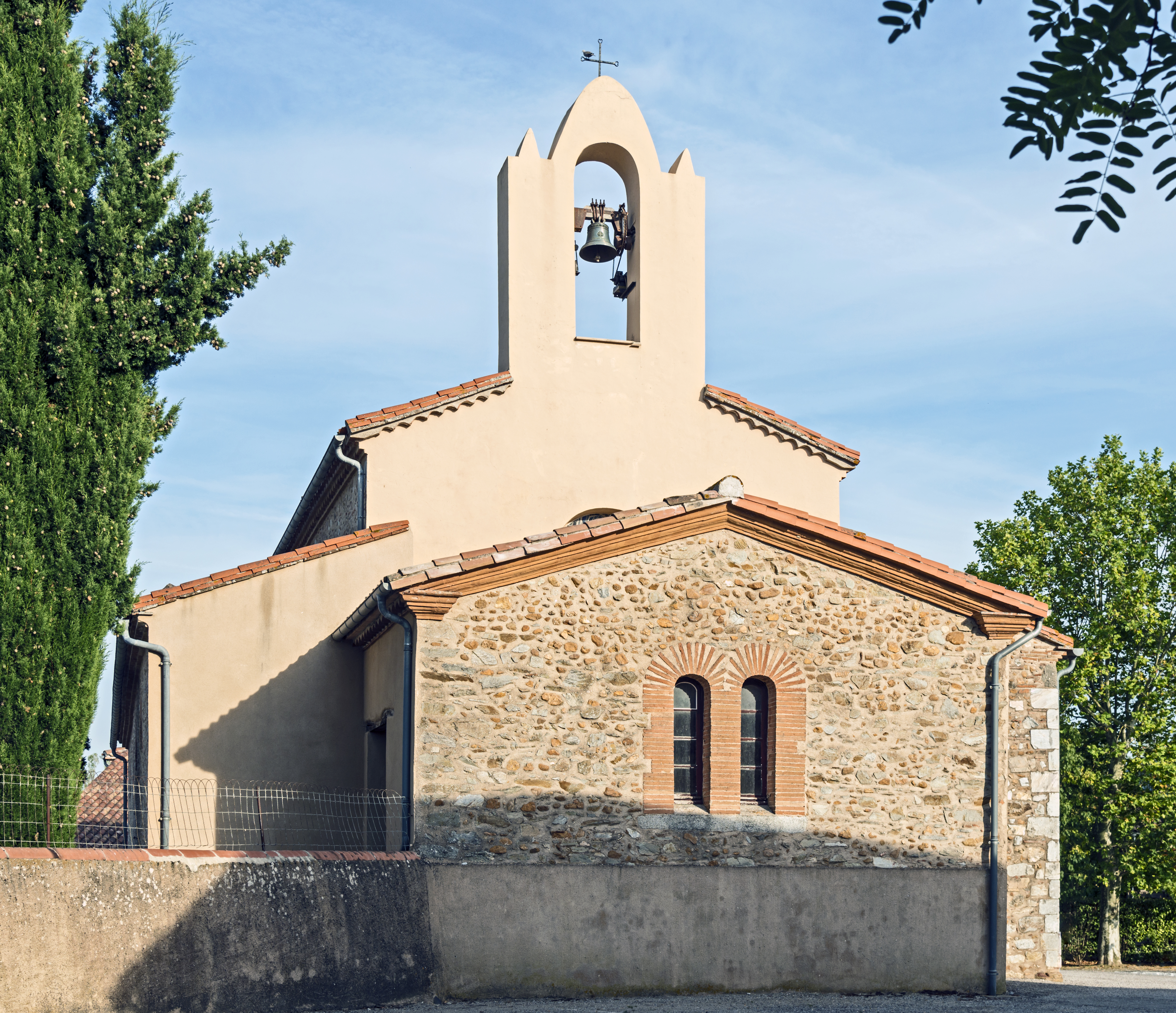

- Coat of arms
- Location of Belleserre
- Location within France Location within Occitanie
- Coordinates: 43°29′27″N 2°03′22″E
- Country: France
- Region: Occitania
- Department: Tarn
- Arrondissement: Castres
- Canton: La Montagne noire
- Intercommunality: CC aux sources du Canal du Midi

Government
  - Mayor (2020–2026): Jean-Marie Petit
- Area^{1}: 4.76 km^{2} (1.84 sq mi)
- Elevation: 300 m (980 ft)
- Highest elevation: 246 m (807 ft)
- Lowest elevation: 187 m (614 ft)
- Population (2023): 171
  - Density: 35.9/km^{2} (93.0/sq mi)
- Time zone: UTC+01:00 (CET)
  - Summer (DST): UTC+02:00 (CEST)
- INSEE/Postal code: 81027 /81540
- ^{1} French Land Register data, which excludes lakes, ponds, glaciers > 1 km^{2} (0.386 sq mi or 247 acres) and river estuaries.

Belleserre (French pronunciation: [bɛlsɛʁ]; Occitan: Bèlasèrra) is a commune in the Tarn department in southern France.

== Monuments ==
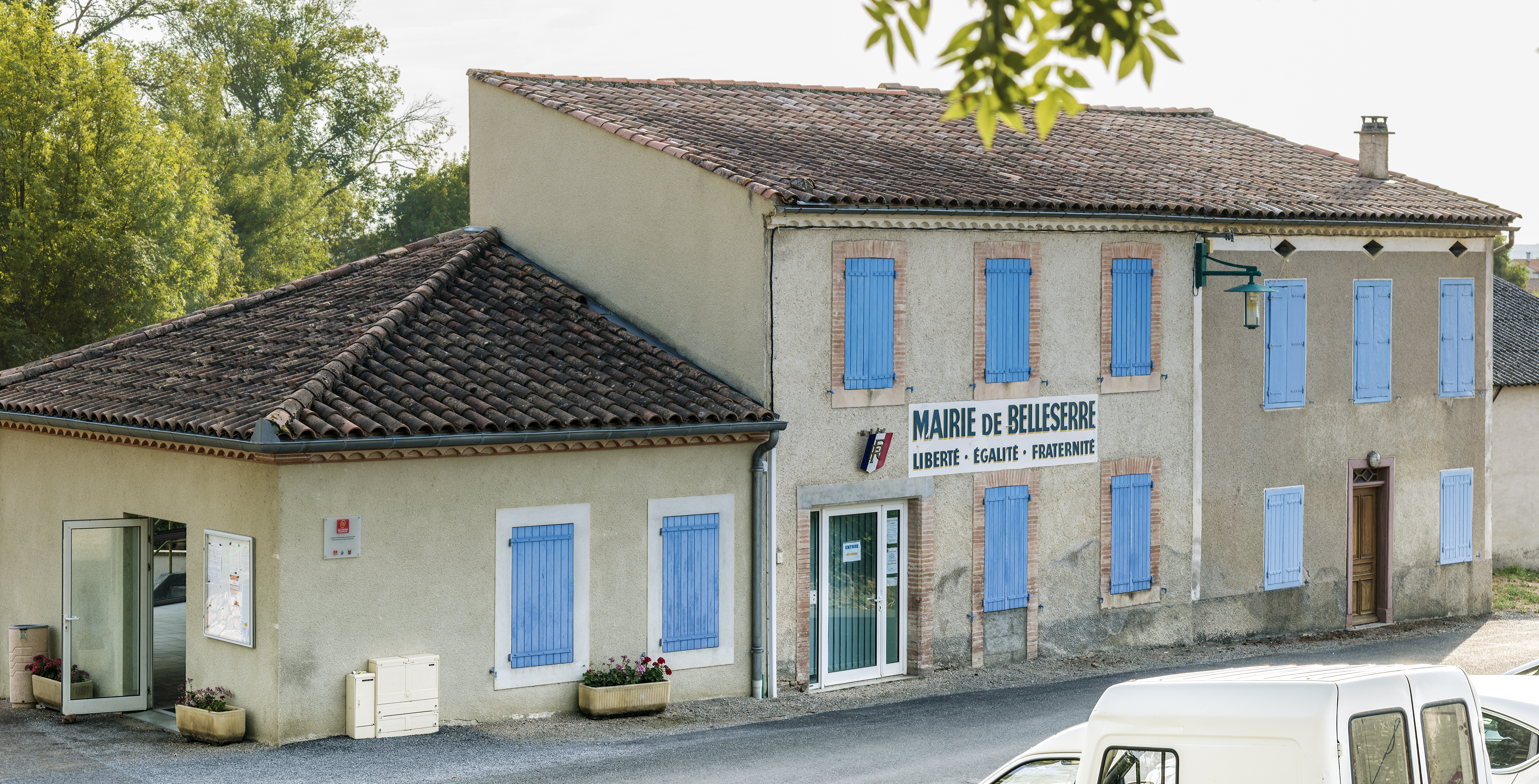
The town hall.

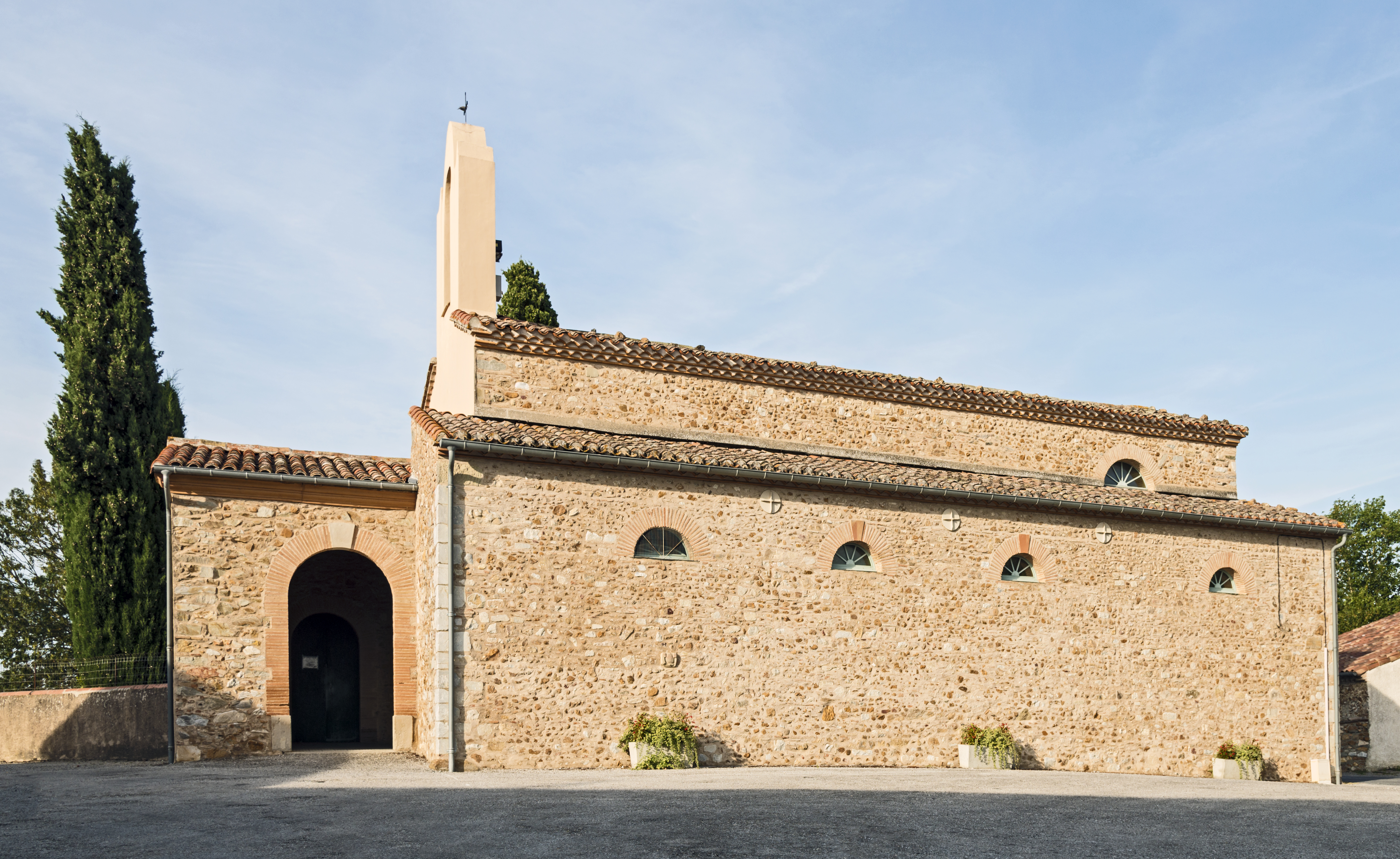
The church.

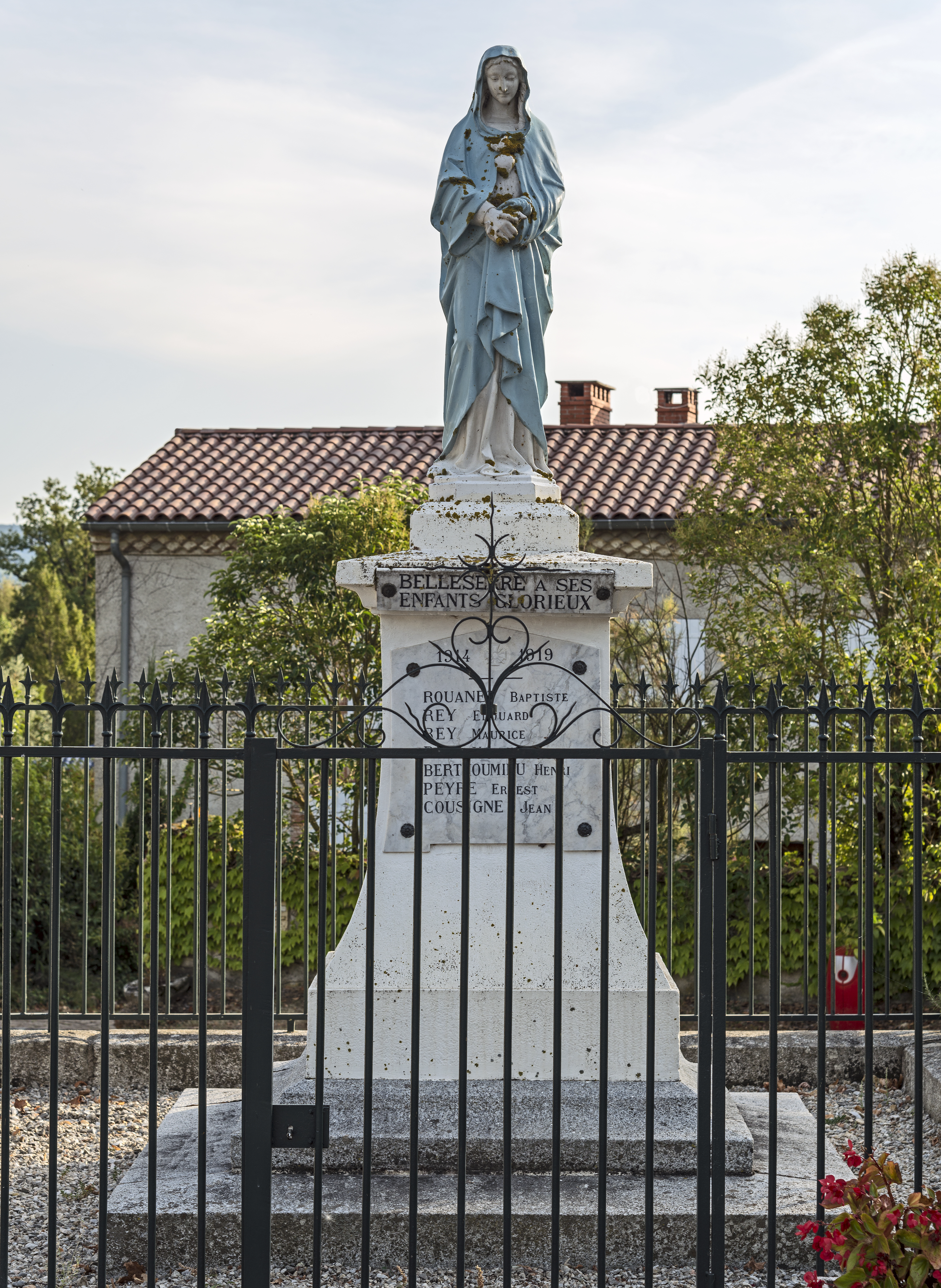
The War Memorial

== See also ==
- Communes of the Tarn department
