= Durfort, Tarn =

Durfort
- Commune
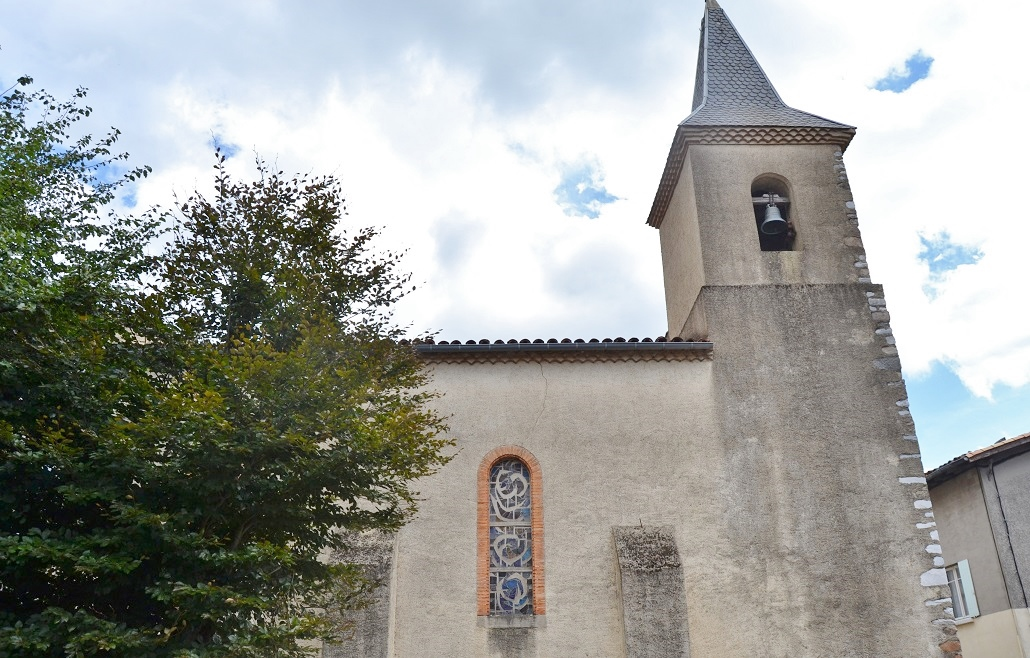
- The church

- Coat of arms
- Location of Durfort
- Location within France Location within Occitanie
- Coordinates: 43°26′20″N 2°04′07″E
- Country: France
- Region: Occitania
- Department: Tarn
- Arrondissement: Castres
- Canton: La Montagne noire
- Intercommunality: CC aux sources du Canal du Midi

Government
  - Mayor (2020–2026): Alain Malignon
- Area^{1}: 4.54 km^{2} (1.75 sq mi)
- Elevation: 324 m (1,063 ft)
- Highest elevation: 660 m (2,170 ft)
- Lowest elevation: 262 m (860 ft)
- Population (2023): 258
  - Density: 56.8/km^{2} (147/sq mi)
- Time zone: UTC+01:00 (CET)
  - Summer (DST): UTC+02:00 (CEST)
- INSEE/Postal code: 81083 /81540
- ^{1} French Land Register data, which excludes lakes, ponds, glaciers > 1 km^{2} (0.386 sq mi or 247 acres) and river estuaries.

Durfort (French pronunciation: [dyʁfɔʁ]; Languedocien: Durfòrt) is a commune in the Tarn department in southern France.

It is located Between Revel, Haute-Garonne and Sorèze, Tarn. It borders the shores of the Sor river, which leads to Montagne Noir (the Black Mountain). The town gave its name to the great Durfort family, which is distinguished in French and English history.

Durfort is nicknamed Cité du Cuivre (the copper city), for the prosperous copper artisan trade that exists there, in addition to artisan trades in leather, glass, basket-making and jewelry.

Durfort is home to Musée du Cuivre (the copper museum), established in 1986, to document five centuries of the local copper craft.

Durfort hosts its annual water festival every August.

During August Silksart - http://silksart.co.uk/ - works and runs workshops in the studio on Rue des Martineurs producing contemporary abstract art and bespoke clothing.

== See also ==
- Communes of the Tarn department
