= Saint-Affrique-les-Montagnes =

- Commune
- Coat of arms
- Location of Saint-Affrique-les-Montagnes
- Location within France Location within Occitanie
- Coordinates: 43°32′18″N 2°12′23″E
- Country: France
- Region: Occitania
- Department: Tarn
- Arrondissement: Castres
- Canton: La Montagne noire
- Intercommunality: Sor et Agout

Government
  - Mayor (2020–2026): Jean-Claude Grand
- Area^{1}: 7.86 km^{2} (3.03 sq mi)
- Elevation: 244 m (801 ft)
- Highest elevation: 333 m (1,093 ft)
- Lowest elevation: 181 m (594 ft)
- Population (2023): 748
  - Density: 95.2/km^{2} (246/sq mi)
- Time zone: UTC+01:00 (CET)
  - Summer (DST): UTC+02:00 (CEST)
- INSEE/Postal code: 81235 /81290
- ^{1} French Land Register data, which excludes lakes, ponds, glaciers > 1 km^{2} (0.386 sq mi or 247 acres) and river estuaries.

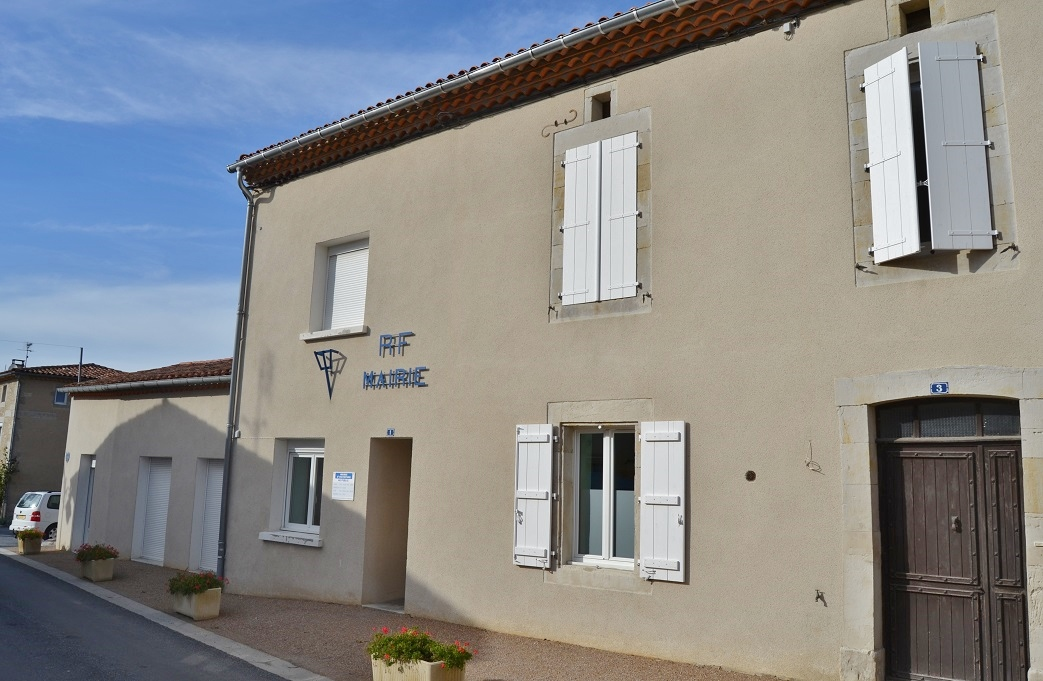
Saint Affrique les Montagnes

Saint-Affrique-les-Montagnes (French pronunciation: [sɛ̃.t‿afʁik le mɔ̃taɲ]; Occitan: Sant Africa de las Montanhas) is a commune in the Tarn department in southern France.

== See also ==
- Communes of the Tarn department
