= Lagardiolle =

- Commune
- Coat of arms
- Location of Lagardiolle
- Location within France Location within Occitanie
- Coordinates: 43°30′19″N 2°05′41″E
- Country: France
- Region: Occitania
- Department: Tarn
- Arrondissement: Castres
- Canton: La Montagne noire
- Intercommunality: CC du Sor et de l'Agout

Government
  - Mayor (2020–2026): Thérèse Rivals
- Area^{1}: 10.25 km^{2} (3.96 sq mi)
- Elevation: 225 m (738 ft)
- Highest elevation: 230 m (750 ft)
- Lowest elevation: 179 m (587 ft)
- Population (2023): 238
  - Density: 23.2/km^{2} (60.1/sq mi)
- Time zone: UTC+01:00 (CET)
  - Summer (DST): UTC+02:00 (CEST)
- INSEE/Postal code: 81129 /81110
- ^{1} French Land Register data, which excludes lakes, ponds, glaciers > 1 km^{2} (0.386 sq mi or 247 acres) and river estuaries.

Lagardiolle (French pronunciation: [laɡaʁdjɔl]; Occitan: La Gardiòla) is a commune in the Tarn department in southern France.

== See also ==
- Communes of the Tarn department
