= Franchet =

Franchet is a French surname. Notable people with the surname include:

- Adrien René Franchet (1834–1900), French botanist
- Louis Franchet d'Espèrey (1856–1942), French general during World War I
