= Saint-Avit, Tarn =

Saint-Avit
- Commune
- Coat of arms
- Location of Saint-Avit
- Location within France Location within Occitanie
- Coordinates: 43°31′00″N 2°06′44″E
- Country: France
- Region: Occitania
- Department: Tarn
- Arrondissement: Castres
- Canton: La Montagne noire
- Intercommunality: CC du Sor et de l'Agout

Government
  - Mayor (2020–2026): Guillaume Jeay
- Area^{1}: 4.86 km^{2} (1.88 sq mi)
- Elevation: 180 m (590 ft)
- Highest elevation: 237 m (778 ft)
- Lowest elevation: 177 m (581 ft)
- Population (2023): 277
  - Density: 57.0/km^{2} (148/sq mi)
- Time zone: UTC+01:00 (CET)
  - Summer (DST): UTC+02:00 (CEST)
- INSEE/Postal code: 81242 /81110
- ^{1} French Land Register data, which excludes lakes, ponds, glaciers > 1 km^{2} (0.386 sq mi or 247 acres) and river estuaries.

Saint-Avit is a commune in the Tarn department in southern France.

== See also ==
- Communes of the Tarn department
