= Cantons of the Tarn department =

The following is a list of the 23 cantons of the Tarn department, in France, following the French canton reorganisation which came into effect in March 2015:

- Albi-1
- Albi-2
- Albi-3
- Albi-4
- Carmaux-1 Le Ségala
- Carmaux-2 Vallée du Cérou
- Castres-1
- Castres-2
- Castres-3
- Les Deux Rives
- Gaillac
- Graulhet
- Le Haut Dadou
- Les Hautes Terres d'Oc
- Lavaur Cocagne
- Mazamet-1
- Mazamet-2 Vallée du Thoré
- La Montagne noire
- Le Pastel
- Plaine de l'Agoût
- Les Portes du Tarn
- Saint-Juéry
- Vignobles et Bastides
