= Massaguel =

- Commune
- Coat of arms
- Location of Massaguel
- Location within France Location within Occitanie
- Coordinates: 43°29′35″N 2°09′40″E
- Country: France
- Region: Occitania
- Department: Tarn
- Arrondissement: Castres
- Canton: La Montagne noire

Government
  - Mayor (2020–2026): Pascal Orbillot
- Area^{1}: 10.09 km^{2} (3.90 sq mi)
- Elevation: 270 m (890 ft)
- Highest elevation: 764 m (2,507 ft)
- Lowest elevation: 251 m (823 ft)
- Population (2023): 347
  - Density: 34.4/km^{2} (89.1/sq mi)
- Time zone: UTC+01:00 (CET)
  - Summer (DST): UTC+02:00 (CEST)
- INSEE/Postal code: 81160 /81110
- ^{1} French Land Register data, which excludes lakes, ponds, glaciers > 1 km^{2} (0.386 sq mi or 247 acres) and river estuaries.

Massaguel (French pronunciation: [masaɡɛl]; Occitan: Maçaguèl) is a commune in the Tarn department in southern France.

== See also ==
- Communes of the Tarn department
