= Verdal =

Verdal may refer to:

== Places ==
- Verdal Municipality, a municipality in Trøndelag county, Norway
- Verdal (town) (also known as Verdalsøra), a town within Verdal Municipality in Trøndelag county, Norway
- Verdal Station, a railway station located in the town of Verdalsøra in Verdal Municipality in Trøndelag county, Norway

== Grapes ==
- Verdal noir or Aspiran noir, a red French wine grape variety
- Verdal or Forcallat tinta, a red Spanish wine grape variety
- Verdal or Malvasia di Sardegna, a group of wine grape varieties grown historically in the Mediterranean region
- Verdal or Palomino (grape), a white grape widely grown in Spain and South Africa
- Verdal or Verdejo, a variety of wine grape that has long been grown in the Rueda region of Spain

== Other uses ==
- Verdal IL, a sports club from Verdalsøra, Norway
- Sigurd Verdal (1927–2010), Norwegian politician

== See also ==
- Verdalle, a commune in the Tarn department in southern France
