= Escoussens =

- Commune
- Coat of arms
- Location of Escoussens
- Location within France Location within Occitanie
- Coordinates: 43°30′04″N 2°12′43″E
- Country: France
- Region: Occitania
- Department: Tarn
- Arrondissement: Castres
- Canton: La Montagne noire
- Intercommunality: Sor et Agout

Government
  - Mayor (2020–2026): Christian Clément
- Area^{1}: 23.62 km^{2} (9.12 sq mi)
- Elevation: 272 m (892 ft)
- Highest elevation: 958 m (3,143 ft)
- Lowest elevation: 235 m (771 ft)
- Population (2023): 614
  - Density: 26.0/km^{2} (67.3/sq mi)
- Time zone: UTC+01:00 (CET)
  - Summer (DST): UTC+02:00 (CEST)
- INSEE/Postal code: 81084 /81290
- ^{1} French Land Register data, which excludes lakes, ponds, glaciers > 1 km^{2} (0.386 sq mi or 247 acres) and river estuaries.

Escoussens is a commune in the Tarn department in southern France.

== See also ==
- Communes of the Tarn department
