= Canton of La Montagne noire =

Coordinates: 43.54°N 2.26°E

The canton of La Montagne noire is an administrative division of the Tarn department, southern France. It was created at the French canton reorganisation which came into effect in March 2015. Its seat is in Labruguière.

It consists of the following communes:

1. Arfons
2. Belleserre
3. Cahuzac
4. Les Cammazes
5. Dourgne
6. Durfort
7. Escoussens
8. Labruguière
9. Lagardiolle
10. Massaguel
11. Saint-Affrique-les-Montagnes
12. Saint-Amancet
13. Saint-Avit
14. Sorèze
15. Verdalle
