= Lac du Laouzas =

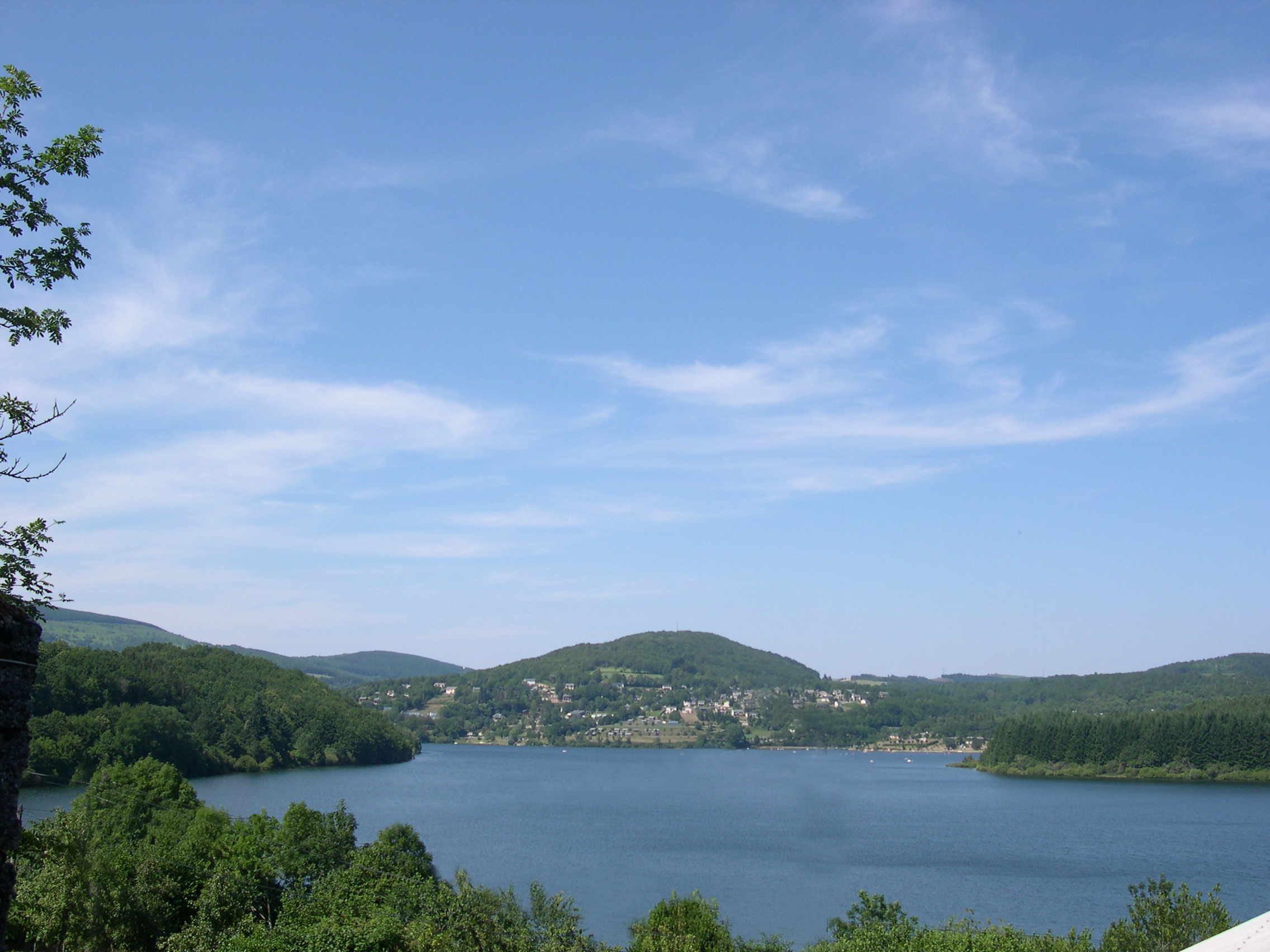

- Location within France
- Location: Tarn
- Coordinates: 43.653218°N 02.783146°E
- Type: reservoir
- Primary inflows: Vèbre
- Primary outflows: Agout
- Basin countries: France
- Surface area: 3.35 km^{2} (1.29 sq mi)
- Max. depth: 40 m (130 ft)
- Surface elevation: 790 m (2,590 ft)

Lac du Laouzas is a lake in Tarn, France. At an elevation of 790 m, its surface area is 3.35 km^{2}.
