= Verdalle =

- Commune
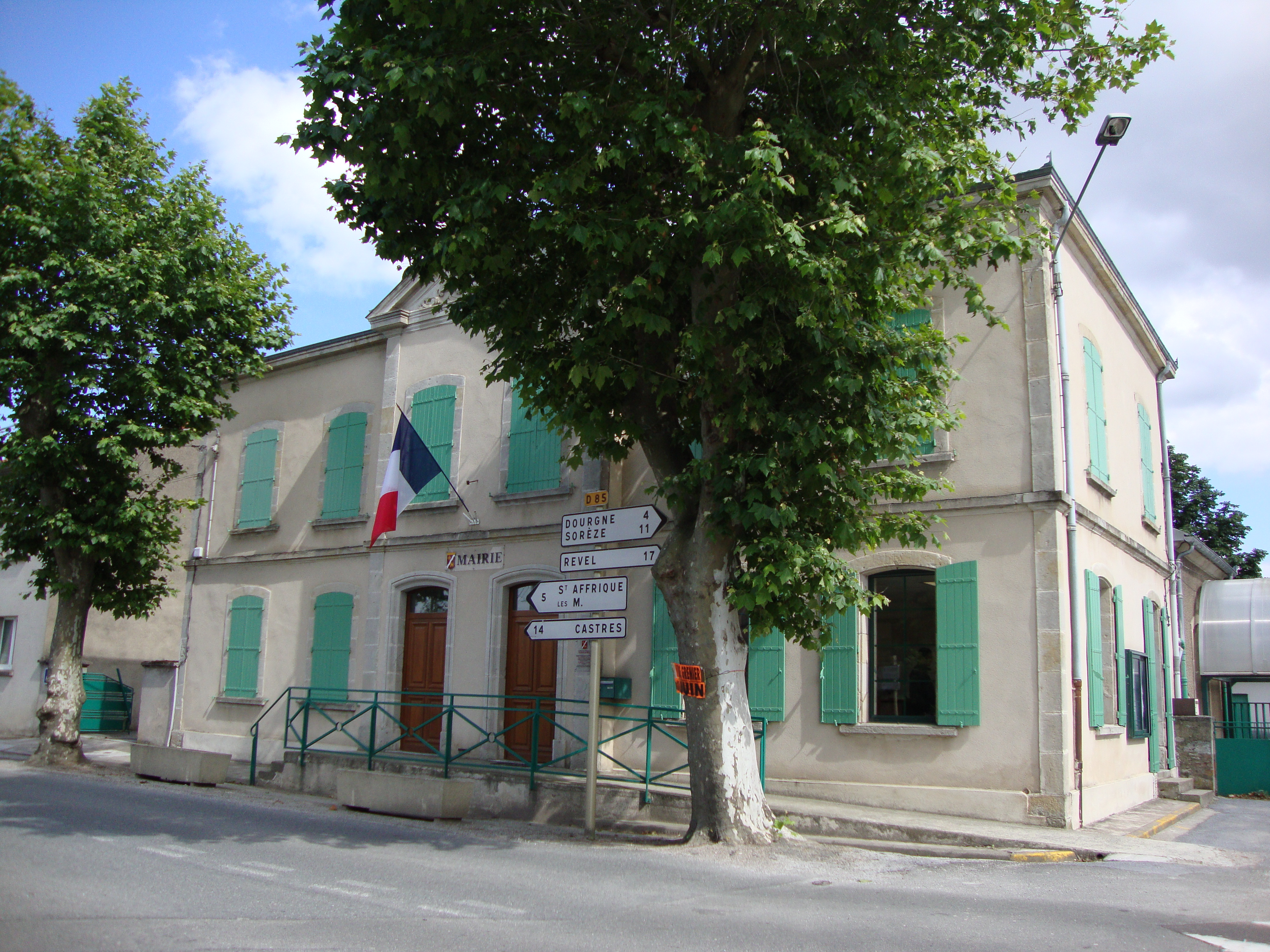
- The town hall in Verdalle

- Coat of arms
- Location of Verdalle
- Location within France Location within Occitanie
- Coordinates: 43°30′43″N 2°09′38″E
- Country: France
- Region: Occitania
- Department: Tarn
- Arrondissement: Castres
- Canton: La Montagne noire
- Intercommunality: CC du Sor et de l'Agout

Government
  - Mayor (2020–2026): Philippe Herlin
- Area^{1}: 24.24 km^{2} (9.36 sq mi)
- Elevation: 236 m (774 ft)
- Highest elevation: 847 m (2,779 ft)
- Lowest elevation: 195 m (640 ft)
- Population (2023): 1,024
  - Density: 42.24/km^{2} (109.4/sq mi)
- Time zone: UTC+01:00 (CET)
  - Summer (DST): UTC+02:00 (CEST)
- INSEE/Postal code: 81312 /81110
- ^{1} French Land Register data, which excludes lakes, ponds, glaciers > 1 km^{2} (0.386 sq mi or 247 acres) and river estuaries.

Verdalle (French pronunciation: [vɛʁdal]; Occitan: Verdala) is a commune in the Tarn department in southern France.

== See also ==
- Communes of the Tarn department
