= Labruguière =

- Commune
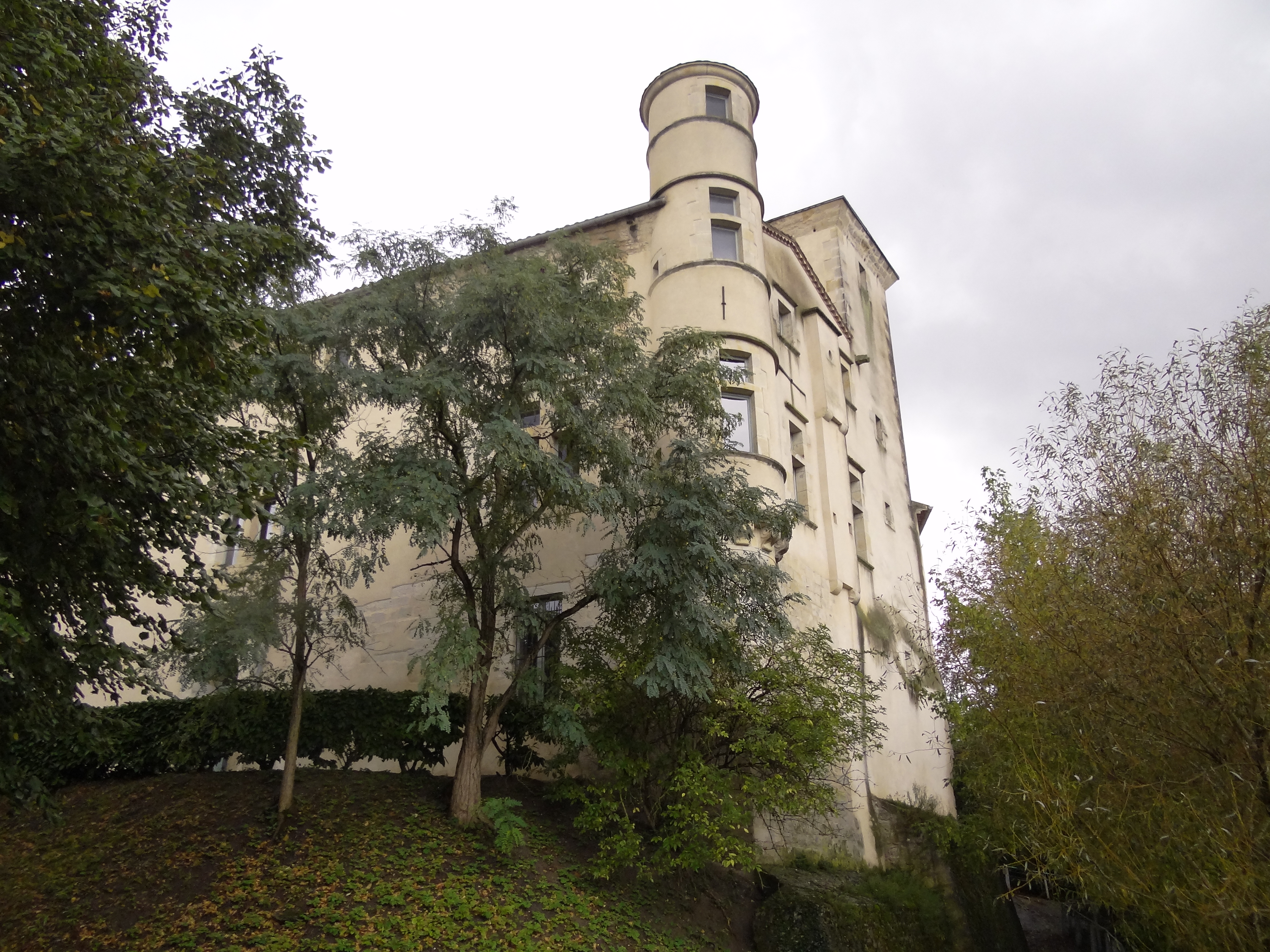
- The chateau in Labruguière

- Coat of arms
- Location of Labruguière
- Location within France Location within Occitanie
- Coordinates: 43°32′24″N 2°15′49″E
- Country: France
- Region: Occitania
- Department: Tarn
- Arrondissement: Castres
- Canton: La Montagne noire
- Intercommunality: CA Castres Mazamet

Government
  - Mayor (2020–2026): David Cucullières
- Area^{1}: 60.73 km^{2} (23.45 sq mi)
- Elevation: 180 m (590 ft)
- Highest elevation: 1,027 m (3,369 ft)
- Lowest elevation: 174 m (571 ft)
- Population (2023): 6,584
  - Density: 108.4/km^{2} (280.8/sq mi)
- Time zone: UTC+01:00 (CET)
  - Summer (DST): UTC+02:00 (CEST)
- INSEE/Postal code: 81120 /81290
- Website: labruguiere.com
- ^{1} French Land Register data, which excludes lakes, ponds, glaciers > 1 km^{2} (0.386 sq mi or 247 acres) and river estuaries.

Labruguière (French pronunciation: [labʁyɡjɛʁ]; Languedocien: La Bruguièira) is a commune in the Tarn department in southern France.

The Thoré is a river that is part of the commune's eastern border, flows north-northwestward through the northern part of the commune, crosses the village, then forms part of its northern border.

== Population ==
Its inhabitants are called Labruguiérois in French.

Historical population
Year	Pop.	±% p.a.
1968	5,333	—
1975	5,468	+0.36%
1982	5,541	+0.19%
1990	5,486	−0.12%
1999	5,488	+0.00%
2007	5,904	+0.92%
2012	6,365	+1.52%
2017	6,535	+0.53%
2023	6,584	+0.12%
Source: INSEE

== See also ==
- Communes of the Tarn department
