= Arrondissements of the Tarn department =

Administrative divisions of Tarn, France

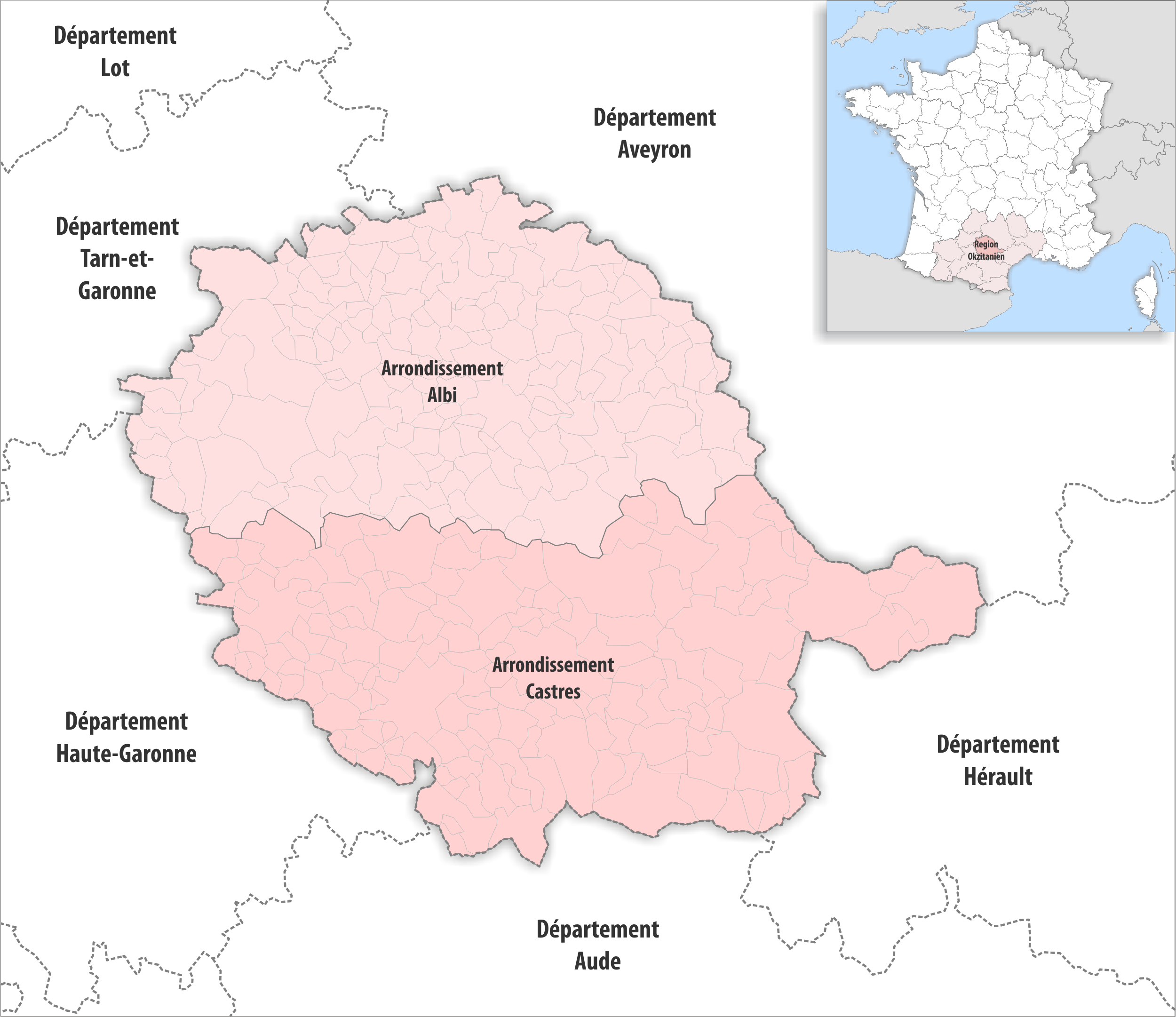
Map of arrondissements of the Tarn department.

The 2 arrondissements of the Tarn department are:

1. Arrondissement of Albi, (prefecture of the Tarn department: Albi) with 163 communes. The population of the arrondissement was 195,484 in 2021.
2. Arrondissement of Castres, (subprefecture: Castres) with 151 communes. The population of the arrondissement was 198,088 in 2021.

== History ==
In 1800 the arrondissements of Albi, Castres, Gaillac and Lavaur were established. The arrondissements of Gaillac and Lavaur were disbanded in 1926.
