= Saint-Amancet =

- Commune
- Coat of arms
- Location of Saint-Amancet
- Location within France Location within Occitanie
- Coordinates: 43°27′59″N 2°06′06″E
- Country: France
- Region: Occitania
- Department: Tarn
- Arrondissement: Castres
- Canton: La Montagne noire
- Intercommunality: CC aux sources du Canal du Midi

Government
  - Mayor (2020–2026): Marie-Hélène Vauthier
- Area^{1}: 12.33 km^{2} (4.76 sq mi)
- Elevation: 254 m (833 ft)
- Highest elevation: 784 m (2,572 ft)
- Lowest elevation: 208 m (682 ft)
- Population (2023): 170
  - Density: 14/km^{2} (36/sq mi)
- Time zone: UTC+01:00 (CET)
  - Summer (DST): UTC+02:00 (CEST)
- INSEE/Postal code: 81237 /81110
- ^{1} French Land Register data, which excludes lakes, ponds, glaciers > 1 km^{2} (0.386 sq mi or 247 acres) and river estuaries.

Saint-Amancet (French pronunciation: [sɛ̃.t‿amɑ̃sɛ]; Occitan: Sanch Amauç) is a commune in the Tarn department in southern France.

== See also ==
- Communes of the Tarn department
