= Louis Franchet d'Espèrey =

French general during World War I (1856–1942)

Marshal Vojvoda Louis Franchet d'Espèrey
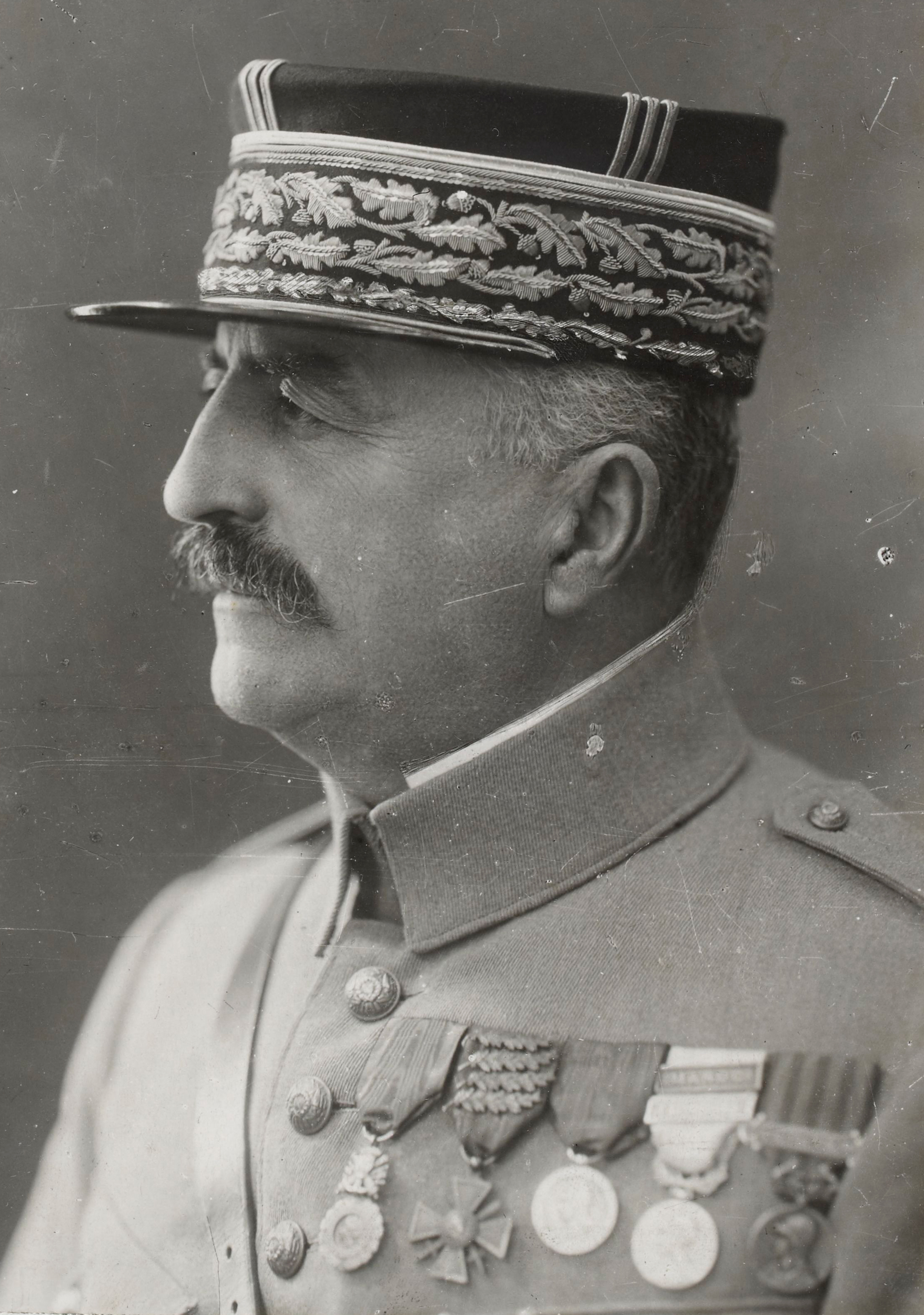

Seat 14 of the Académie française
- In office 27 July 1934 – 8 July 1942
- Preceded by: Hubert Lyautey
- Succeeded by: Robert d'Harcourt

Personal details
- Born: 25 May 1856 Mostaganem, French Algeria
- Died: 8 July 1942 (aged 86) Saint-Amancet, French State
- Education: École Spéciale Militaire

Military service
- Allegiance: (France) Third Republic
- Branch/service: French Army: Infantry
- Years of service: 1873 – 1925
- Rank: Division general (Note: Marshal of France is a dignity and not a rank.)
- Commands: 5th Army; Allied Army of the Orient
- Battles/wars: Boxer Rebellion; World War I

Louis Félix Marie François Franchet d'Espèrey (Note: French pronunciation: [lwi feliks maʁi fʁɑ̃swa fʁɑ̃ʃɛ dɛpɛʁɛ]; Serbo-Croatian pronunciation: [frǎnʃe deperê(ː)]) (25 May 1856 – 8 July 1942) was a French general during World War I. In September 1914, as the new commander of the French 5th Army, he played a notable role in organising the allied response that led to the First Battle of the Marne. As commander of the large Allied army based at Salonika, he conducted the successful Macedonian campaign, which caused the collapse of the Southern Front and contributed to the armistice.

== Early years ==
Franchet d'Espèrey was born in Mostaganem in French Algeria, the son of a cavalry officer in the Chasseurs d'Afrique. He was educated at Saint-Cyr and graduated in 1876. After being assigned to a regiment of Algerian Tirailleurs (native infantry), d'Espèrey served in French Indochina, in China (in the Boxer Rebellion in 1900, during which his cousin the German plenipotentiary Clemens von Ketteler was killed); and subsequently in Morocco. Franchet d'Espèrey then commanded various infantry regiments in France. He received command of I Corps in 1913.

== First World War ==
=== 1914 ===
==== Corps commander ====
In 1914, Franchet d'Espèrey did well as a corps commander at the Battle of Charleroi. On 23 August, the third day of the battle, with the German Second Army pressing the French centre, Franchet d’Esperey saw an opportunity for his I Corps to counterattack from the French right. Despite repeated pleas from 10 am onward, Lanrezac refused him permission to do so. On 23 August Fifth Army was attacked again, this time also on the flanks, by Bulow’s German Second Army to the north and Hausen’s German Third Army against Franchet to the right.

At the Battle of Guise on 29 August, the day was won by a successful attack by his I Corps in the north: leading his men on horseback, he is said to have called out "how do you like this advance, Mr Staff College Professor?" to Colonel Philippe Pétain, who was commanding an infantry brigade. At that battle, he was ordered to rally III Corps on his left and X Corps on his right.

==== Army commander ====
On the eve of the First Battle of the Marne, Franchet d'Espèrey was given command of the Fifth Army. When asked by Joffre whether he was willing to accept the command he replied equivocally "the same as another". He added that the higher a man is promoted the more staff he gets. Despite being a naturally kind man, he affected a tyrannical demeanour to galvanise his officers. Edward Spears, then a lieutenant liaising between the BEF and the Fifth Army, wrote that he physically resembled a howitzer shell and of the "galvanic effect" that he had on his staff on taking command. He ordered that any man not doing his duty was to be shot, including staff officers. When General de Mas Latrie protested at an order, Franchet d'Esperey took the telephone from the staff officer Hély d'Oissel and told Latrie "Marchez ou crevez." ("March or die.") before putting the phone down on him. He would break up roadblocks by firing his revolver out of the window of his car. President Raymond Poincaré noted that Franchet d'Esperey was "a stranger to depression".

His predecessor, Charles Lanrezac, had had poor relations with the BEF commander, Sir John French, so Franchet d'Espèrey immediately sent the British commander a telegram signed "Franchet d’Esperey KCVO" promising cooperation. On 4 September Joffre asked Franchet d'Espèrey and Ferdinand Foch, who was commanding the newly formed Ninth Army, if they would be willing to give battle in a day or two. Franchet d'Espèrey met with Henry Hughes Wilson (BEF Sub Chief of Staff) and George Macdonogh (Head of BEF Intelligence) at Bray (simultaneous with Joseph Gallieni and Michel Maunoury's meeting with the BEF Chief of Staff Archibald Murray). Franchet d'Espèrey's plan reached Joffre at 6:30 pm as he was eating his dinner with two Japanese officers. He impressed Joffre by presenting a plan for a concerted attack by the Allied armies on 6 September if Maunoury's Sixth Army reached a certain position on the Ourcq at a certain time ("if not the British will not march"). If not, he would retreat a little further, south of the Grand Morin with the Sixth and the BEF l, striking Alexander von Kluck's 1st Army in flank. That was to become the basis for Instruction Générale No 6, the Allied plan of attack at the Marne.

When asked by Franchet d'Espèrey to be ready to attack on 6 September, General Hache of III Corps "looked as if he had been hit on the head with a club". De Mas Latrie was sacked and replaced by Maud'huy, from Castelnau's Second Army. Fifth Army eventually saw the replacement of three out of five corps commanders and seven out of thirteen division commanders, and a similar proportion of brigade commanders.

=== 1916–1917 ===
By March 1916, Franchet d'Espérey was in command of the Eastern Army Group and by January 1917 the Northern Army Group. He was badly defeated by the Germans at the Battle of Chemin des Dames in May 1918.

=== 1918 victory in Salonika ===
Removed from the Western Front, he was appointed commander of the Allied Army of the Orient at Salonika on the Macedonian front.

Between 15 and 29 September 1918, Franchet d'Espèrey, in command of a large army of Greeks (9 divisions), French (6 divisions), Serbs (6 divisions), British (4 divisions) and Italians (1 division), staged a successful offensive in Macedonia that ended by taking Bulgaria out of the war. General Franchet d'Espèrey followed up the victory by overrunning much of the Balkans and by the war's end, his troops had penetrated well into Hungary. That collapse of the Southern Front was one of several developments that effectively triggered the November 1918 Armistice.

== Later life ==
Although it is often stated in history books that on 8 February 1919, Franchet d'Espèrey entered Constantinople on a white horse, emulating Mehmed II's entrance in 1453 after the Fall of Constantinople and thus signifying that Ottoman sovereignty over the imperial city was over, this has recently been shown to be a myth.

After World War I ended, Franchet d'Espèrey directed operations against the Hungarian Soviet Republic in 1919. He was made a marshal of France on 19 February 1921 and was given the honorary title of Vojvoda (equivalent of Field-Marshal) by the Yugoslavian monarchy on 29 January 1921.

In 1924 Franchet d'Espèrey was appointed inspector-general of France's North African troops, who had made up a substantial portion of the French forces serving under him on the Macedonian Front. He subsequently became interested in the strategic potential of the "grand axis" north–south route across the Sahara.

He joined a trans-Saharan expedition led by Gaston Gradis that left Colomb-Béchar on 15 November 1924 in three six-wheel Renaults. Other members were the journalist Henri de Kérillis, commandant Ihler, the brothers Georges Estienne and René Estienne, three Renault mechanics and three legionnaires. The expedition reached Savé in Dahomey on 3 December 1924 after a journey of 3,600 kilometres (2,200 mi). The expedition leaders took the train south, and reached Porto-Novo on the Atlantic on 14 December 1924.

Franchet d'Espèrey represented France at the coronation of Haile Selassie of Ethiopia in Addis Ababa on 1 November 1930. He was elected to the Académie française on 15 November 1934.

He died in Saint-Amancet on 8 July 1942 and is interred at Les Invalides.

== Assessment ==
His victories against Bulgaria and the remnants of the German and Austro-Hungarian Armies were independent of the situation on the Western Front, demonstrated by the fact that they came before the main assault on the Hindenburg Line and against a still-capable army that offered strong resistance to the British and the Greeks in the Battle of Doiran.

As a consequence of his generalship, Bulgaria signed an armistice on 29 September, thus becoming the first Central Power to do so. In terms of politics, he was a nationalist ultra-royalist whose loyalty to France outweighed his loyalty to the Bourbons.

Several French cities and towns have boulevards and roads named after him such as in Dijon, Reims, Saint-Étienne, Versailles and Lorient. The Belgian city of Dinant has an Avenue Franchet d'Esperey. A boulevard in Belgrade, Serbia, is named after him. In Greece, Salonika has a street named after him.

British troops stationed in France eventually gave him the nickname "Desperate Frankie", due to his energy and constantly moving back and forth.

== Honours and decorations ==
- Légion d’honneur
  - Knight (21 August 1886)
  - Officer (29 December 1904)
  - Commander (31 December 1912)
  - Grand Officer (30 December 1914)
  - Grand Cross (10 July 1917)
- Médaille militaire (1918)
- Croix de guerre 1914–1918 with 3 palms
- Médaille Interalliée de la Victoire
- Médaille commémorative du Maroc
- Médaille Commémorative de la Grande Guerre
- Colonial Medal with bars "Tonkin" and "Maroc"
- Order of Karađorđe's Star with Swords
- Grand Cross of the Order of Saint-Charles (27 February 1930)

== See also ==
- Marching Regiment of the Foreign Legion
