= Tarn (department) =

Department in Occitania, France

- Department of France
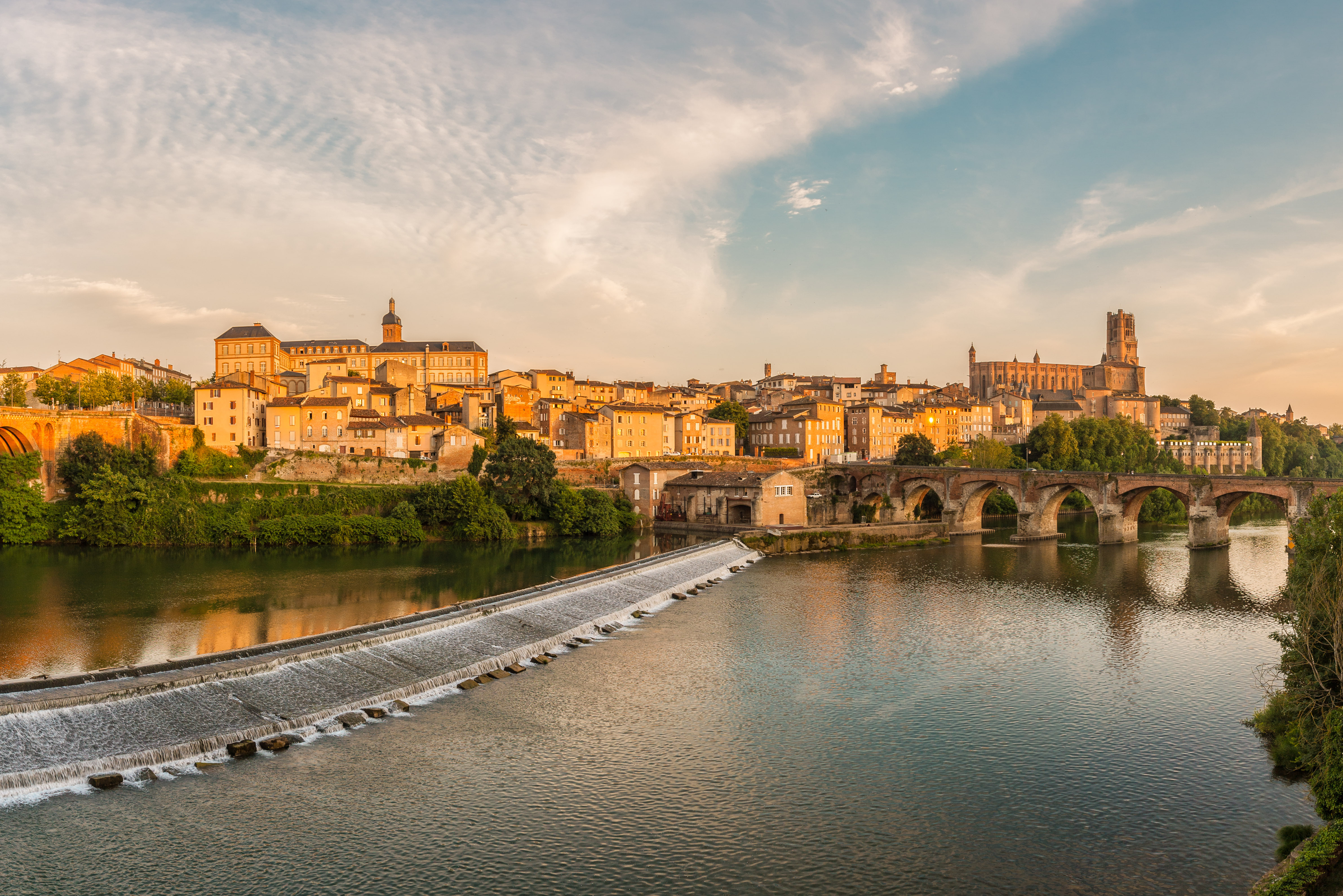
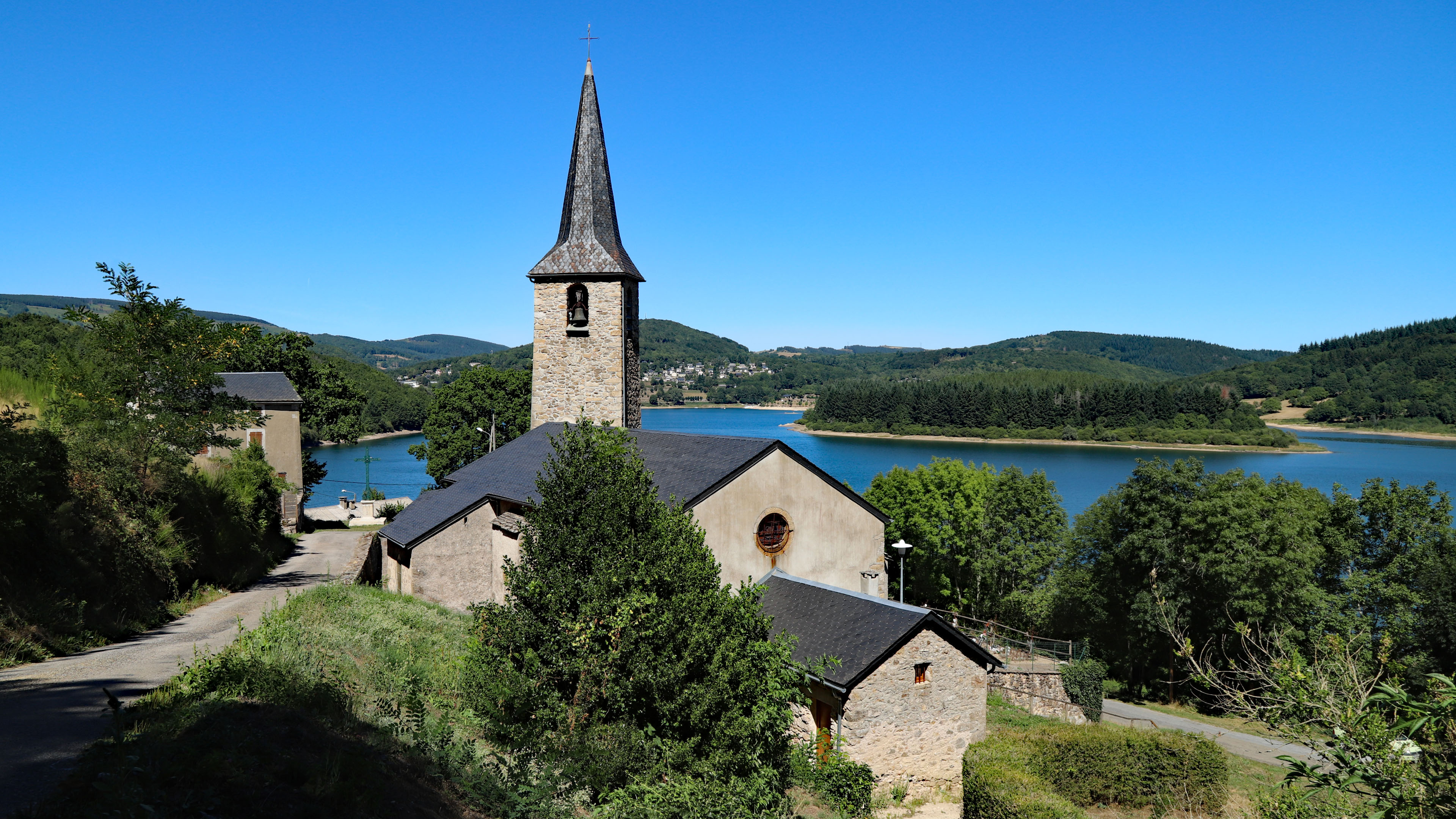
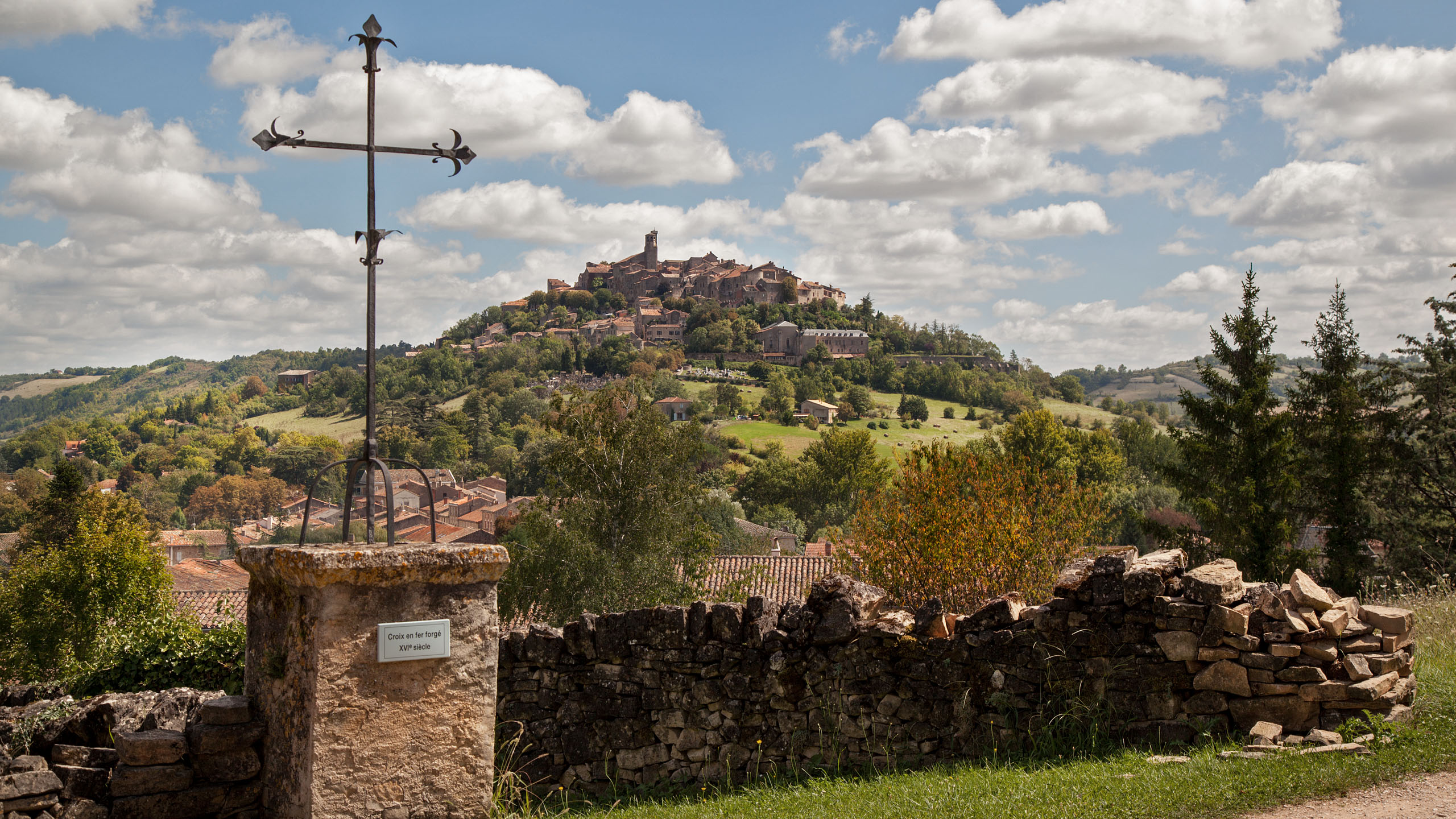
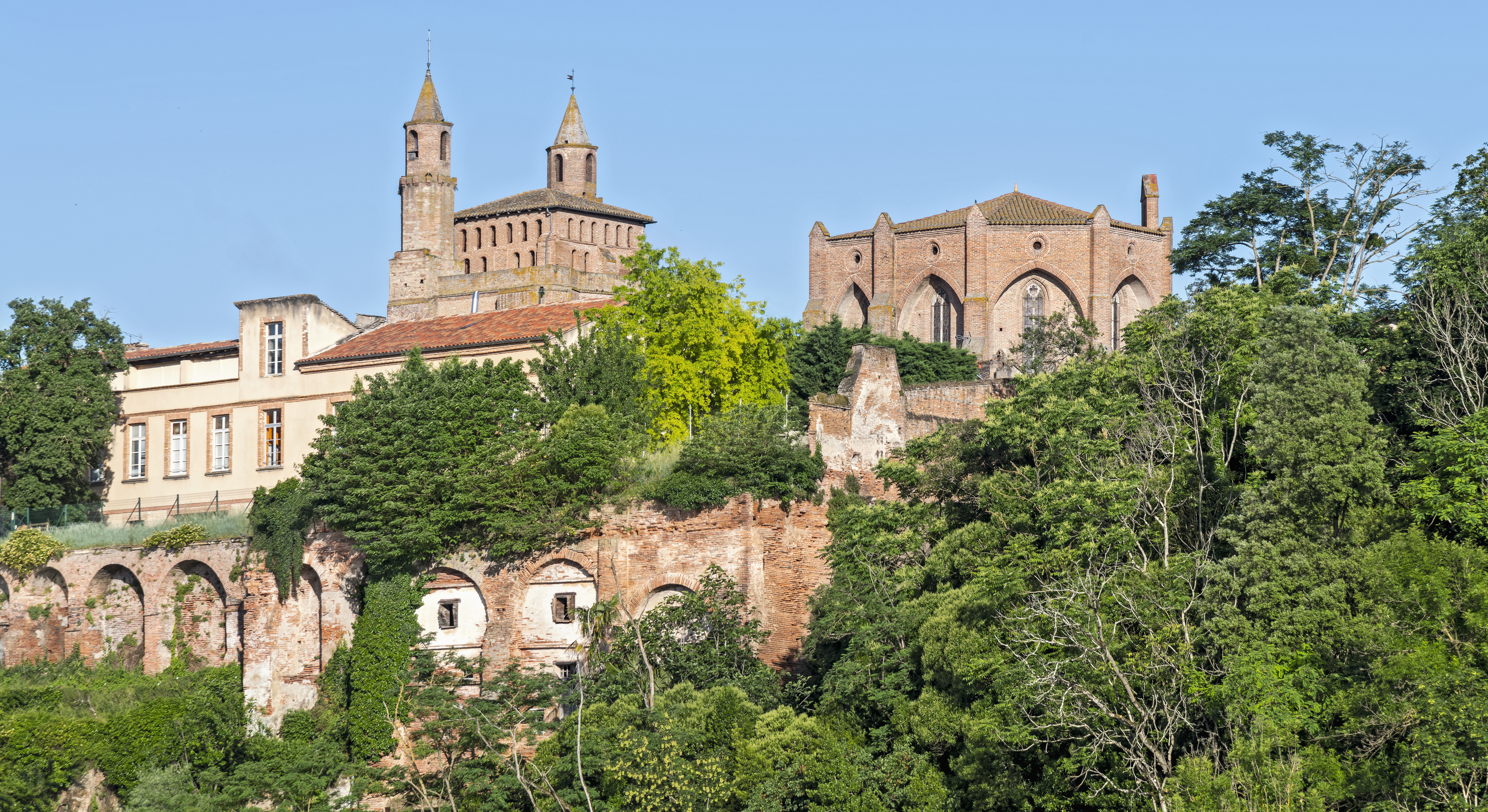
- From top down, left to right: Albi and the Tarn river, Lac du Laouzas, Cordes-sur-Ciel, Rabastens

- Flag Coat of arms

- Location of Tarn in France
- Coordinates: 43°49′N 2°12′E
- Country: France
- Region: Occitanie
- Departement: 4 March 1790
- Prefecture: Albi
- Subprefecture: Castres

Government
  - President of the Departmental Council: Christophe Ramond (PS)

Area
  - Total: 5,758 km^{2} (2,223 sq mi)

Population (2023)
  - Total: 397,352
  - Rank: 61st
  - Density: 69.01/km^{2} (178.7/sq mi)
- Demonym: Tarnais
- Time zone: UTC+1 (CET)
  - Summer (DST): UTC+2 (CEST)
- ISO 3166 code: FR-81
- Department number: 81
- Arrondissements: 2
- Cantons: 23
- Communes: 314
- Website: http://www.tarn.fr

Tarn (French: [taʁ(n)], Occitan: [taɾ]) is a department in the Occitania region in Southern France. Named after the river Tarn, it had a population of 397,352 as of 2023. Its prefecture and largest city is Albi; it has a single subprefecture, Castres. In French, the inhabitants of Tarn are known as Tarnais (masculine) and Tarnaises (feminine). Its INSEE and postcode number is 81.

== History ==
Tarn is one of the original 83 departments created during the French Revolution on 4 March 1790, through application of the Law of 22 December 1789. It was created from part of the former province of Languedoc, and comprised the dioceses of Albi and Castres (which found themselves merged in 1817).

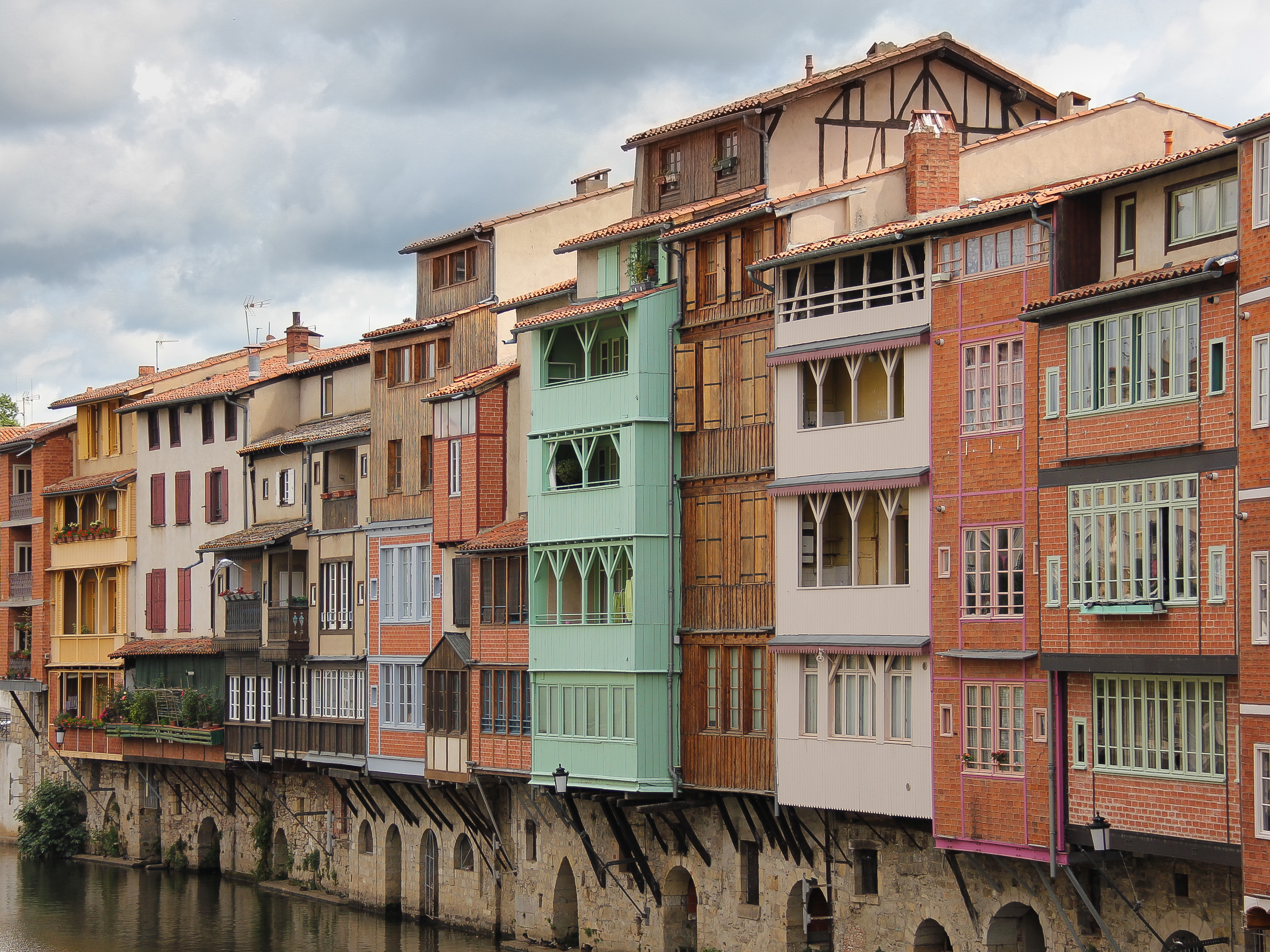
Castres is best known in French political history as the birthplace of Socialist leader Jean Jaurès.

The new department had five districts: Albi, Castres, Lavaur, Gaillac, Lacaune. The capitals (now prefectures) were, alternatively, Albi and Castres but, from 1790 to 1797, the capital was only Albi; in 1797, the capital was moved to Castres. In 1800, Albi became again the capital of the department and the arrondissements were created; the department had four arrondissements: Albi, Castres, Gaillac and Lavaur. In 1926, the arrondissements of Gaillac and Lavaur were eliminated.

By the law of 28 Pluviôse Year 5, the departments of Hérault and of Tarn exchanged the canton of Anglès (which had been part of the diocese of Saint-Pons, but which has remained in Tarn) for that of Saint-Gervais-sur-Mare (which had been part of the diocese of Castres, but which today remains in Hérault).

== Geography ==
Topographic map of the Tarn department

Tarn is part of the Occitanie region and has an area of 5,757.9 km^{2} (2,223 sq mi). The department is surrounded by five departments, all belonging to the region Occitanie: Hérault to the southeast, Aude to the south, Aveyron to the north and east, Haute-Garonne to the southwest and west, as well as Tarn-et-Garonne to the northwest. It is one of two French departments surrounded entirely by other departments of the same region.

The slope of the department is from east to west, and its general character is mountainous or hilly. Tarn's three principal ranges lying to the south-east are: the Mountains of Lacaune, the Sidobre and the Montagne Noire, belonging to the Cévennes.

The stony and wind-blown slopes of the Mountains of Lacaune (Monts de Lacaune) are used for pasture. The highest point of the range and of the department is the Puech Montgrand, 1,267 m (4,157 ft) high; several other summits are not much short of this. The granite-strewn plateaux of the Sidobre, from 490 to 610 m (1,600 to 2,000 ft) high, separate the valley of the river Agout from that of its western tributary, the Thoré River. The Montagne Noire, on the southwestern border of the department, derives its name from the forests on its northern slope. Its highest point is the Pic de Nore at 1,211 m (3,973 ft) high.

The limestone and sandstone foot-hills are clothed with vines and fruit trees, and are broken by deep alluvial valleys of particular fertility. With the exception of a small portion of the Montagne Noire, which drains into the river Aude, the whole department belongs to the basin of the Garonne.

== Demographics ==
Tarn has a population, in 2023, of 397,352, for a population density of 69.0 inhabitants/km^{2}.

=== Population evolution ===
Population development since 1801:

Historical population

Year	Pop.	±% p.a.
1801	270,908	—
1806	296,228	+1.80%
1821	313,713	+0.38%
1831	335,844	+0.68%
1841	351,795	+0.47%
1851	363,073	+0.32%
1861	353,633	−0.26%
1872	352,718	−0.02%
1881	359,223	+0.20%
1891	346,739	−0.35%
1901	332,093	−0.43%
1911	324,090	−0.24%
1921	295,588	−0.92%
1931	302,994	+0.25%

Year	Pop.	±% p.a.
1936	297,871	−0.34%
1946	298,117	+0.01%
1954	308,197	+0.42%
1962	319,560	+0.45%
1968	332,011	+0.64%
1975	338,024	+0.26%
1982	339,345	+0.06%
1990	342,723	+0.12%
1999	343,402	+0.02%
2007	369,189	+0.91%
2012	378,947	+0.52%
2017	387,890	+0.47%
2023	397,352	+0.40%

=== Principal towns ===
The most populous commune is Albi, the prefecture. As of 2023, there are 10 communes with more than 6,000 inhabitants:

Commune	Population (2023)
Albi	51,290
Castres	42,505
Gaillac	16,162
Graulhet	13,129
Lavaur	10,965
Mazamet	10,085
Carmaux	9,872
Saint-Sulpice-la-Pointe	9,719
Labruguière	6,584
Saint-Juéry	6,564

== Administration ==
=== Administrative divisions ===
There are 2 arrondissements, 23 cantons and 314 communes in Tarn.

Arrondissement	INSEE code	Capital	Population (2023)	Area (km^{2})	Density (inhabitants/km^{2})	Communes
Albi	811	Albi	198,659	2,732	72.7	163
Castres	812	Castres	198,693	3,026	65.7	151

=== Politics ===
==== Departmental Council of Tarn ====
The Departmental Council of Tarn has 46 seats. In the 2015 departmental elections, the Socialist Party (PS) won 26 seats and The Republicans (LR) and Union of Democrats and Independents (UDI) alliance won 18 seats; two miscellaneous right candidates complete the assembly composition. Christophe Ramond (PS) has been President of the Departmental Council since 2017.

==== Members of the National Assembly ====
In the 2024 legislative election, Tarn elected the following members of the National Assembly:

Constituency	Member	Party
Tarn's 1st constituency	Philippe Bonnecarrère	Miscellaneous centre
Tarn's 2nd constituency	Karen Erodi	La France Insoumise
Tarn's 3rd constituency	Jean Terlier	Renaissance

== Tourism ==
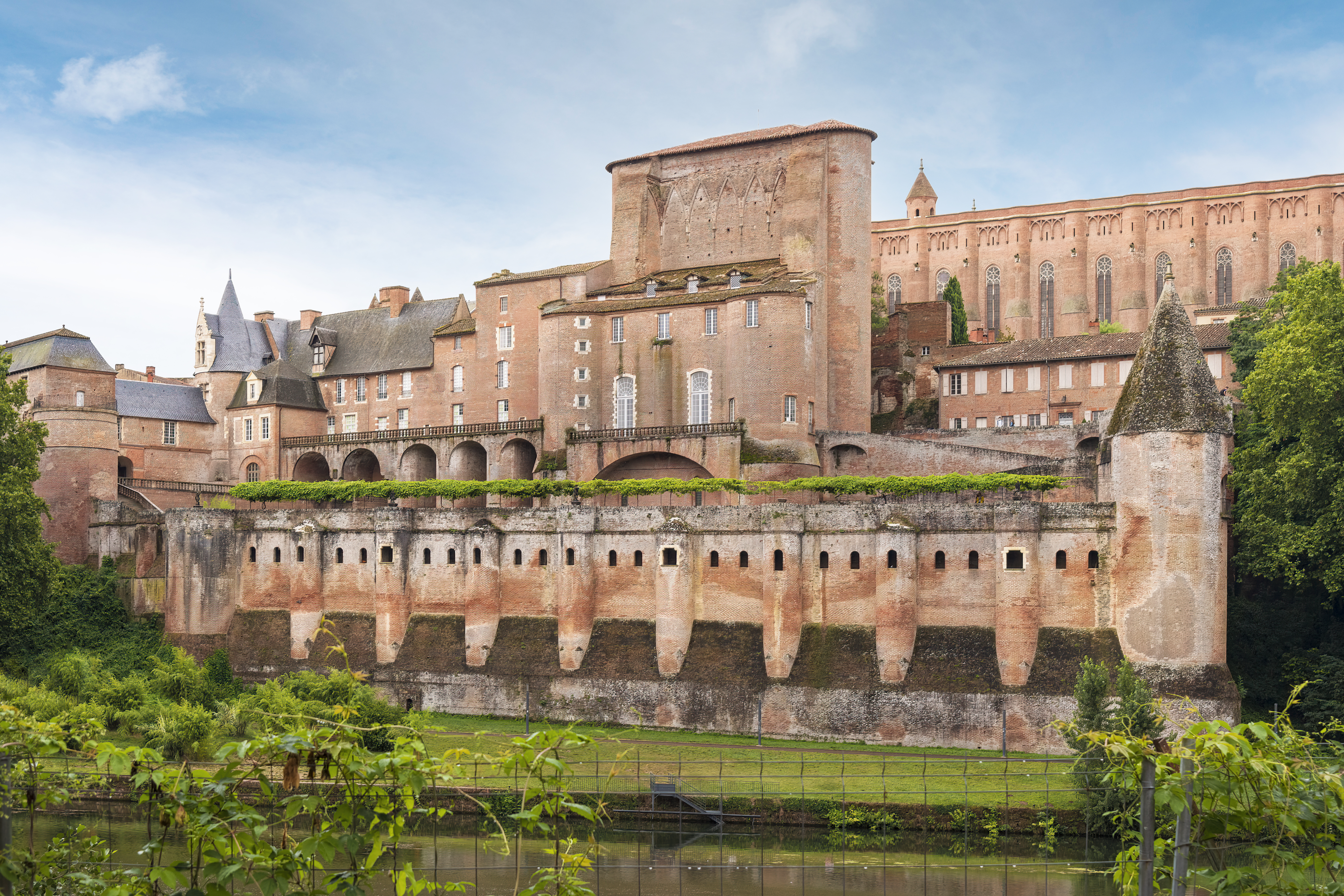
Palais de la Berbie Albi

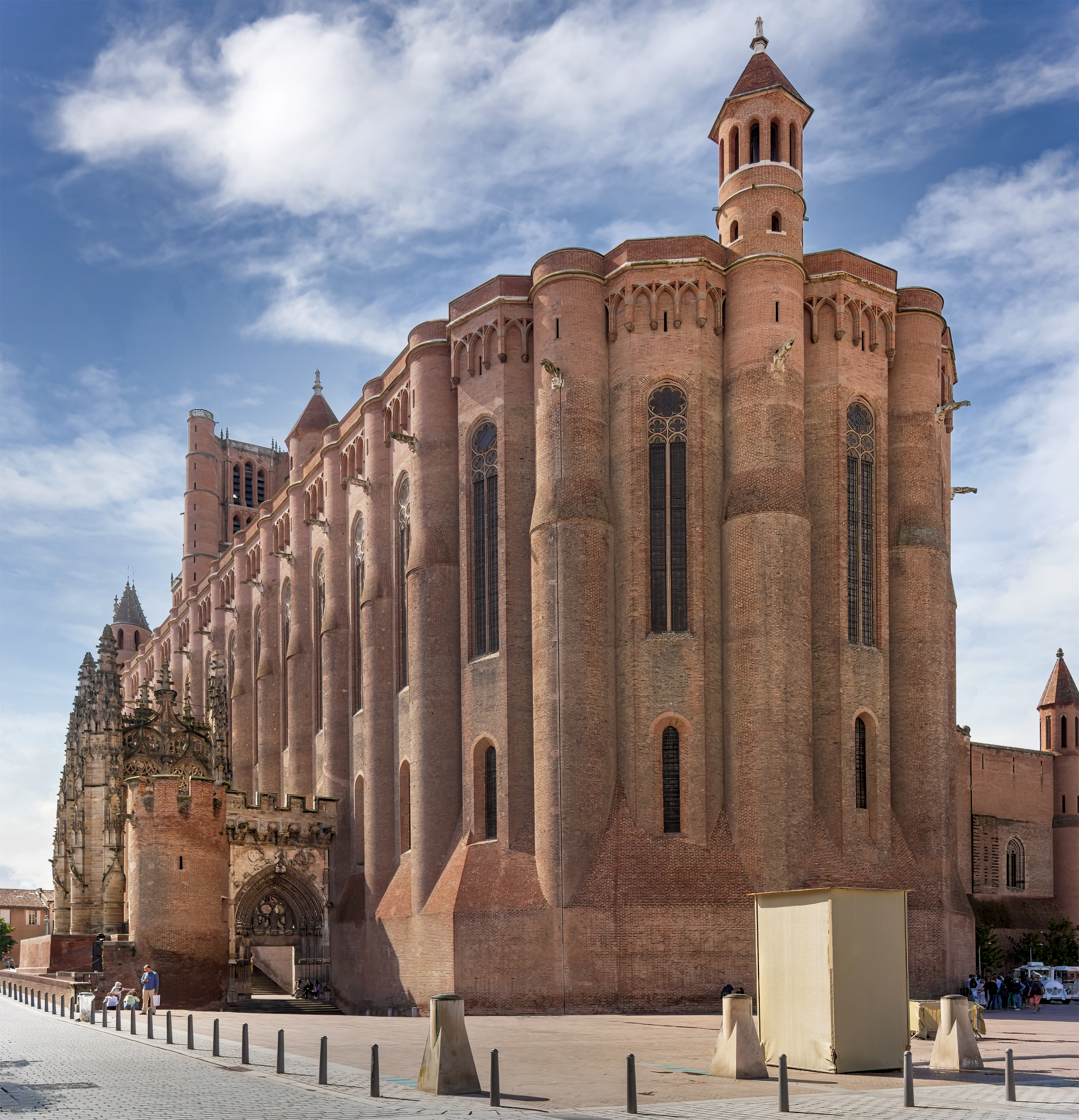
Albi Cathedral

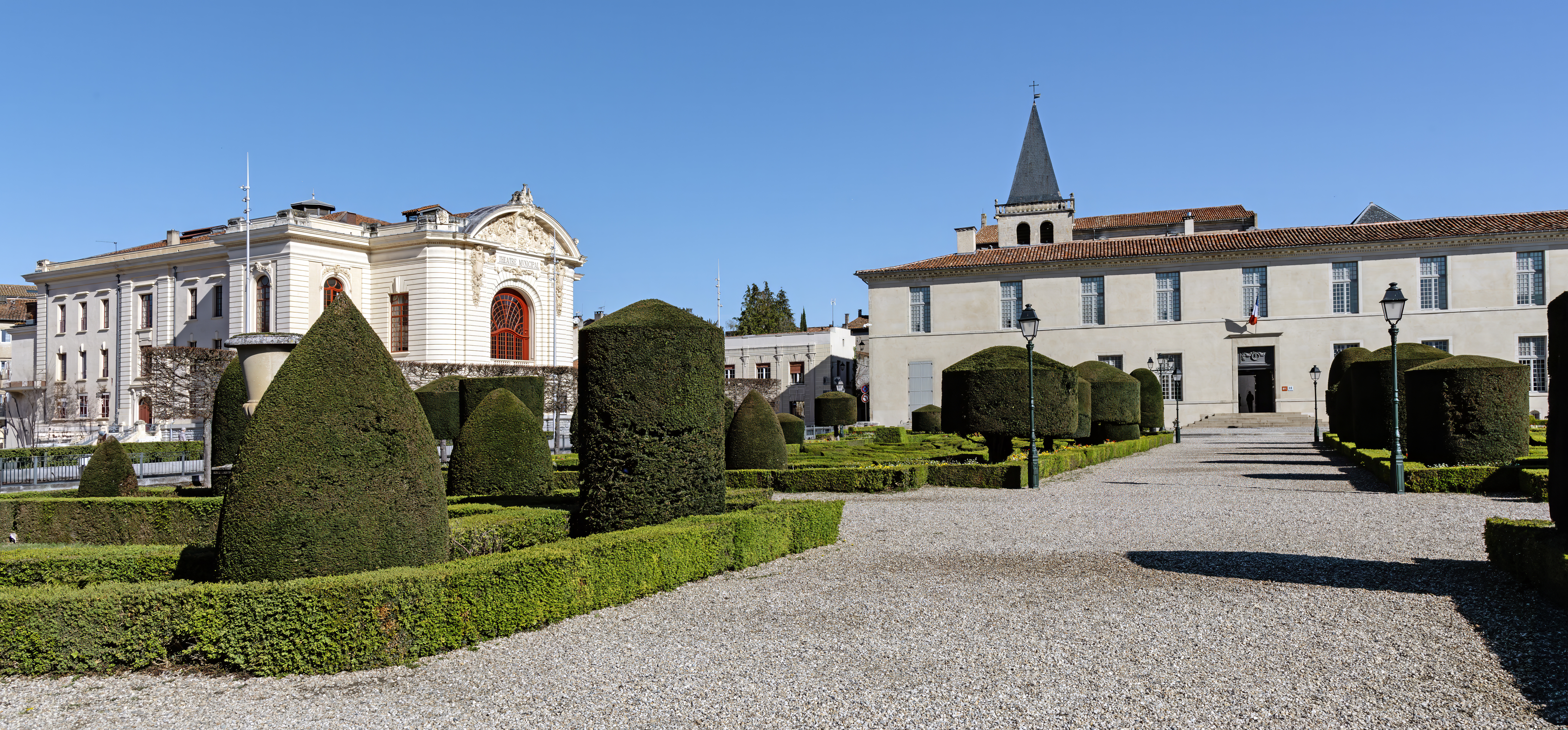
Castres The theater and the Goya Museum (Episcopal Palace) seen from the bishop's garden

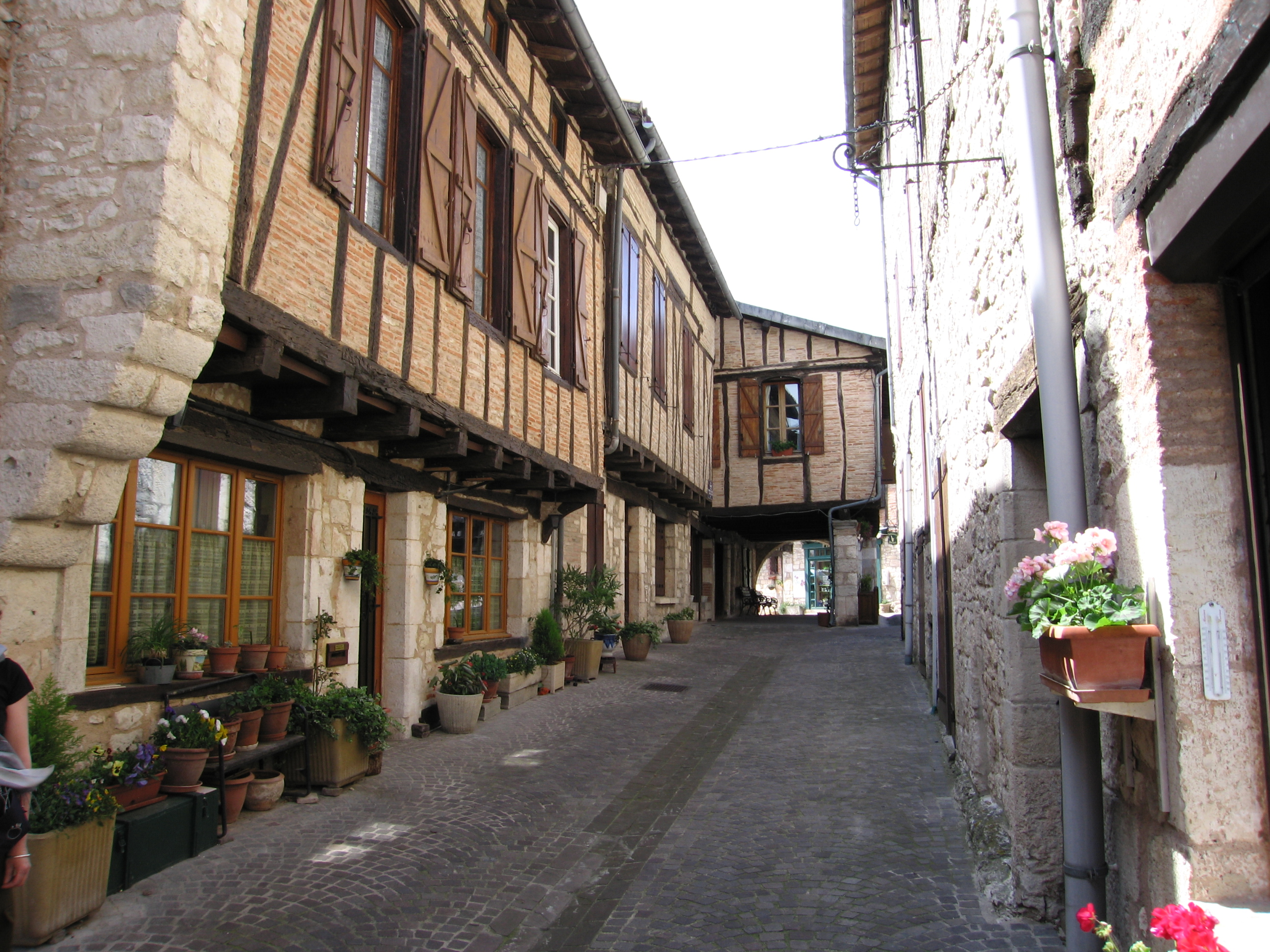
Street in Castelnau-de-Montmiral

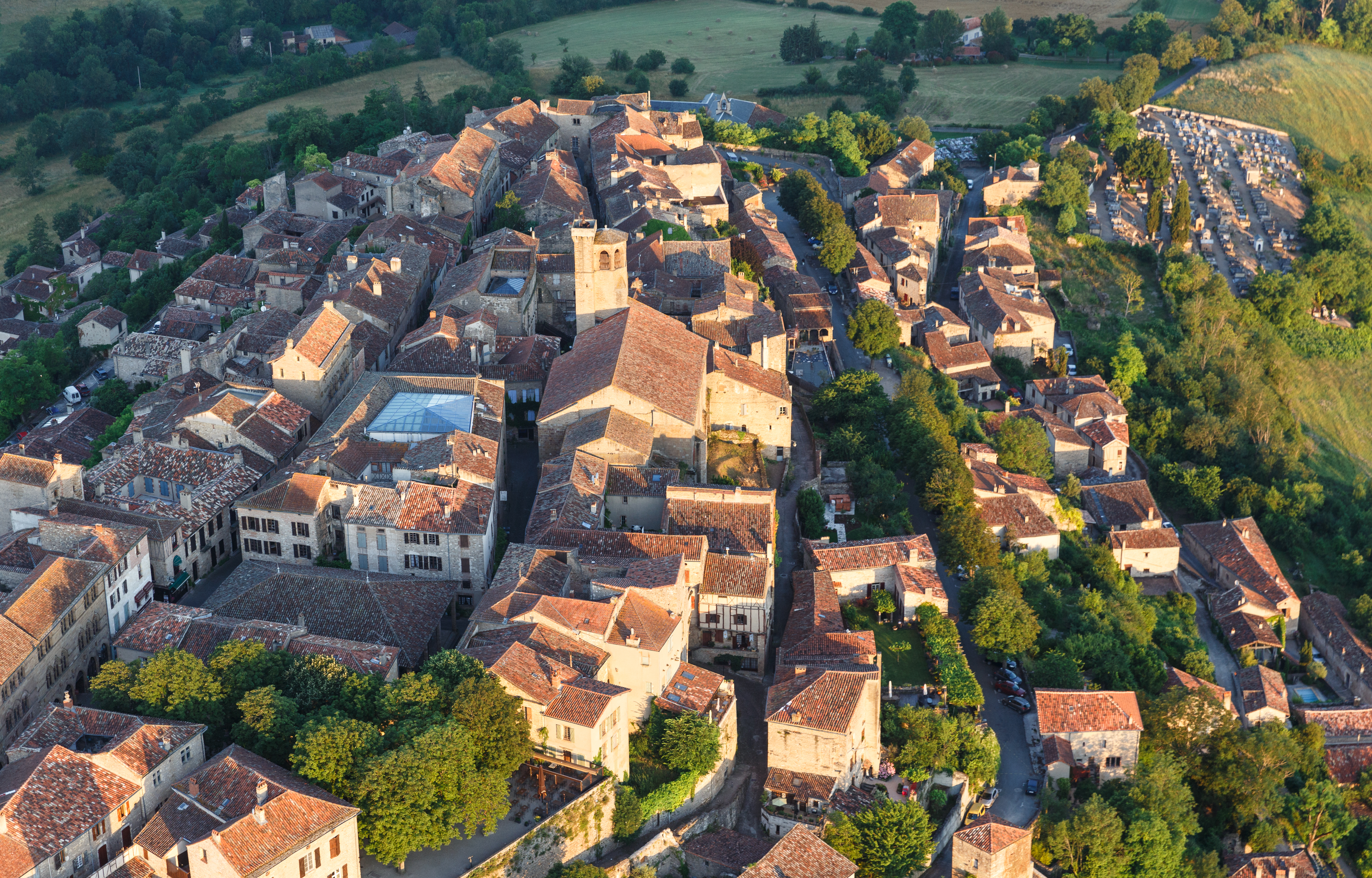
View of Cordes-sur-Ciel

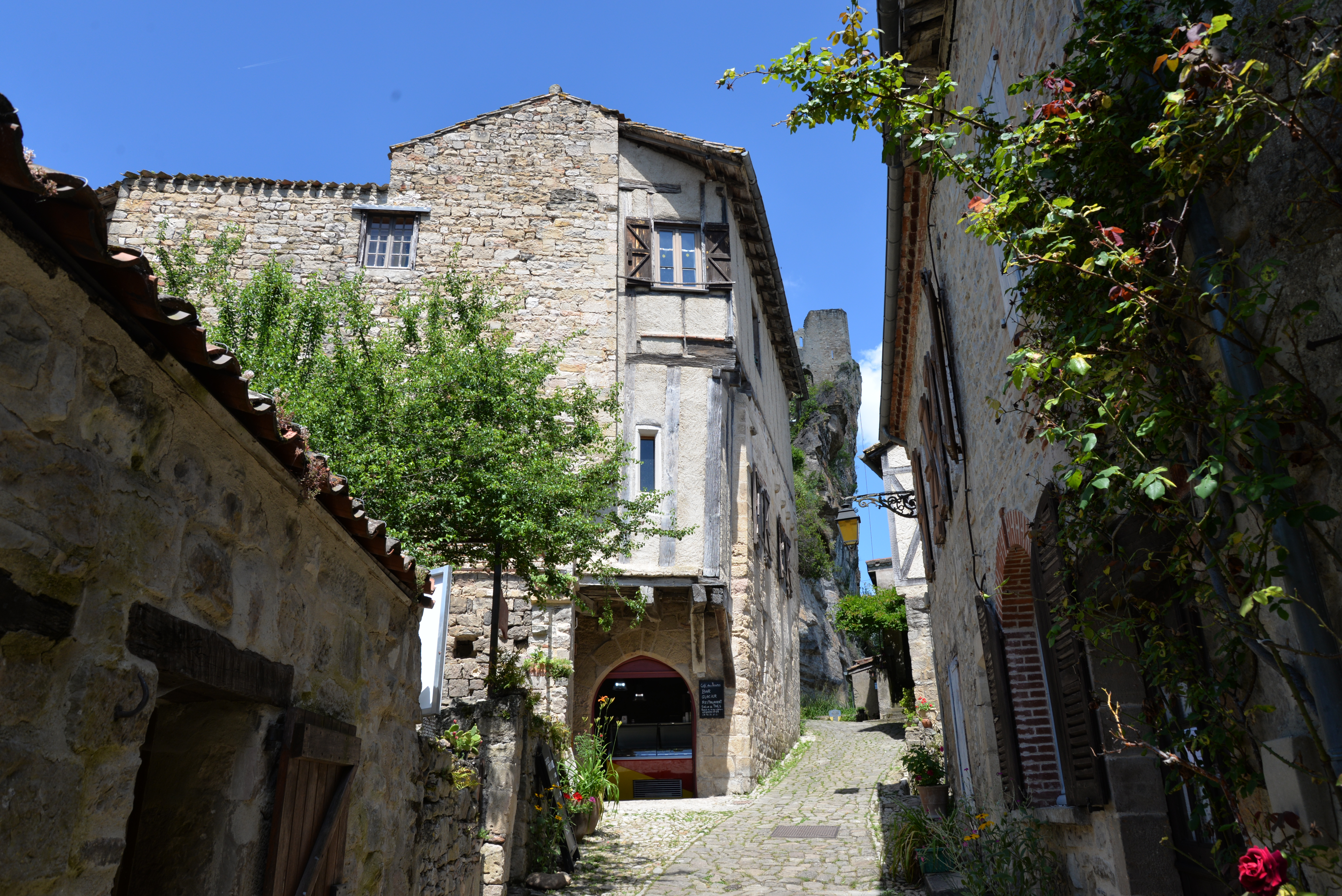
Street in Penne

== See also ==
- Cantons of the Tarn department
- Communes of the Tarn department
- Arrondissements of the Tarn department
- Tourism in Tarn
