= Noailhac, Tarn =

Noailhac
- Commune
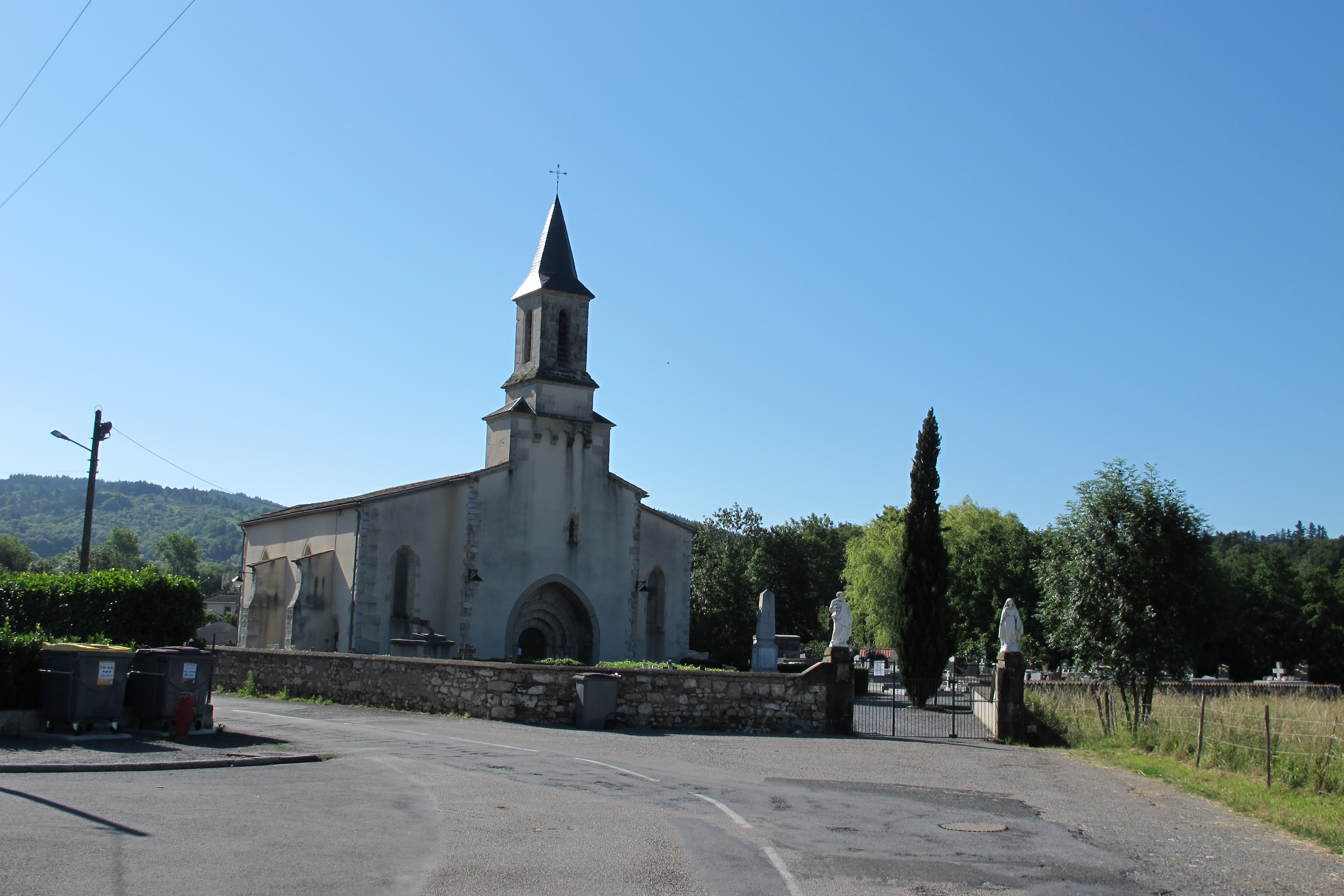
- Church of Our Lady in Noailhac

- Coat of arms
- Location of Noailhac
- Location within France Location within Occitanie
- Coordinates: 43°34′29″N 2°21′11″E
- Country: France
- Region: Occitania
- Department: Tarn
- Arrondissement: Castres
- Canton: Mazamet-1
- Intercommunality: CA Castres Mazamet

Government
  - Mayor (2020–2026): Francis Mathieu
- Area^{1}: 20.77 km^{2} (8.02 sq mi)
- Elevation: 227 m (745 ft)
- Highest elevation: 475 m (1,558 ft)
- Lowest elevation: 212 m (696 ft)
- Population (2023): 828
  - Density: 39.9/km^{2} (103/sq mi)
- Time zone: UTC+01:00 (CET)
  - Summer (DST): UTC+02:00 (CEST)
- INSEE/Postal code: 81196 /81490
- ^{1} French Land Register data, which excludes lakes, ponds, glaciers > 1 km^{2} (0.386 sq mi or 247 acres) and river estuaries.

Noailhac (French pronunciation: [nɔajak]; Occitan: Noalhac) is a French commune located in the south-east of the Tarn department, in the Occitanie region. Historically and culturally, the commune is in the Castrais region, a primarily agricultural area, between the right bank of the Agout to the south and its tributary, the Dadou, to the north.

Exposed to an altered oceanic climate, it is drained by the Durenque, the Durencuse, and various other small rivers. The comprises three natural areas of ecological, faunal, and floral interest.

Noailhac is a rural commune with a population of 835 in 2022. It is part of the Castres catchment area. Its inhabitants are called Noailhacois or Noailhacoises.

== Geography ==
=== Location ===
Noailhac was located in the urban area of Castres, 8.5 kilometers east of Castres.

=== Neighboring communes ===
The neighboring towns are Boissezon, Castres, Payrin-Augmontel, Pont-de-Larn, Saint-Salvy-de-la-Balme and Valdurenque.

Noailhac borders six other communes.

=== Communication routes and transport ===
The on-demand transport line 106 of the Libellus urban network provides service to the town, connecting it to Valdurenque (allowing connections with regular lines to Castres) and to Boissezon.

=== Hydrology ===
The commune is located in the Garonne basin, within the Adour-Garonne watershed. It is drained by the Durenque, the Durencuse, a branch of the Durenque, the Balazou stream, the Ganoubre stream, the Blazié stream, the Mengararié stream, the Vergnole stream, the Puech du Fau stream, the Puech-Pitou stream, the Pradailles stream, the Chien stream, and various smaller streams, forming a hydrographic network with a total length of 36 km.

The Durenque, with a total length of 31.5 km, rises in the commune of Bez and flows from east to west. It crosses the commune and empties into the Agout at Castres, after passing through eight communes.

The Durencuse, with a total length of 17.7 km, rises in the commune of Bez and flows from east to west. It crosses the commune and flows into the Durenque at Boissezon, after crossing 5 communes.

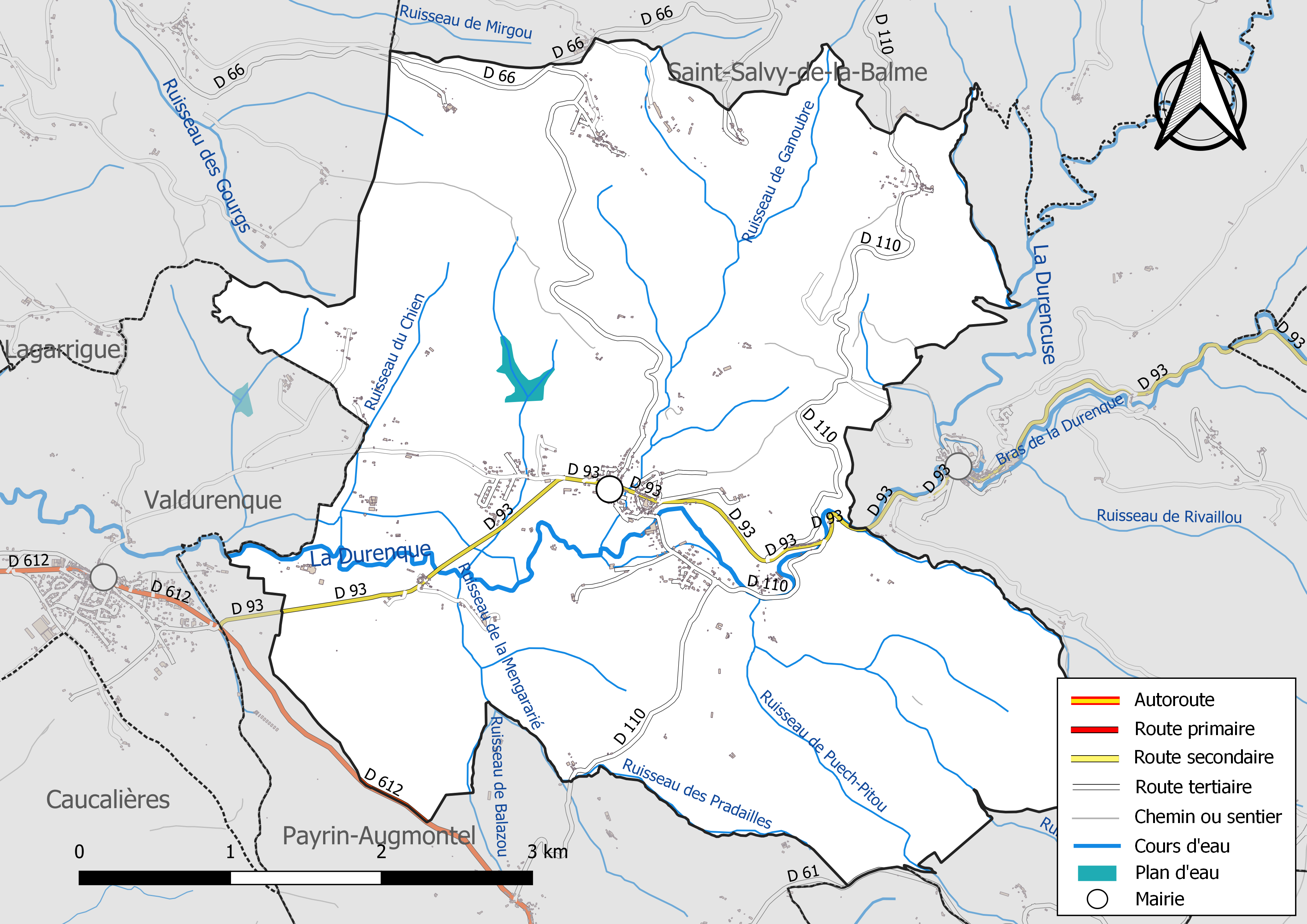
Noailhac hydrographic and road networks.

=== Climate ===
In 2010, the commune's climate was characterized by an altered Mediterranean climate, according to a study by the National Center for Scientific Research based on a series of data covering the period 1971–2000. In 2020, Météo-France published a typology of climates in metropolitan France, in which the commune is exposed to an altered oceanic climate and is located in the Aquitaine-Gascon climate region, characterized by abundant rainfall in spring and moderate rainfall in autumn, low sunshine in spring, hot summers (19.5 °C), light winds, frequent fog in autumn and winter, and frequent thunderstorms in summer (15 to 20 days).

For the period 1971–2000, the average annual temperature was 13.2 °C, with an annual temperature range of 15.6 °C. The average annual cumulative precipitation is 960 mm, with 9.5 days of precipitation in January and 5.6 days in July. For the period 1991–2020, the average annual temperature observed at the nearest Météo-France weather station, "Mazamet," in the commune of Mazamet, 9 km away as the crow flies. is 11.4 °C, and the average annual cumulative precipitation is 1,179.1 mm. The maximum temperature recorded at this station is, reached on; the minimum temperature is, reached on.

The climatic parameters of the commune were estimated for the middle of the century (2041–2070) according to different greenhouse gas emission scenarios based on the new DRIAS-2020 reference climate projections. They can be viewed on a dedicated site published by Météo-France in November 2022.

=== Natural environment and biodiversity ===
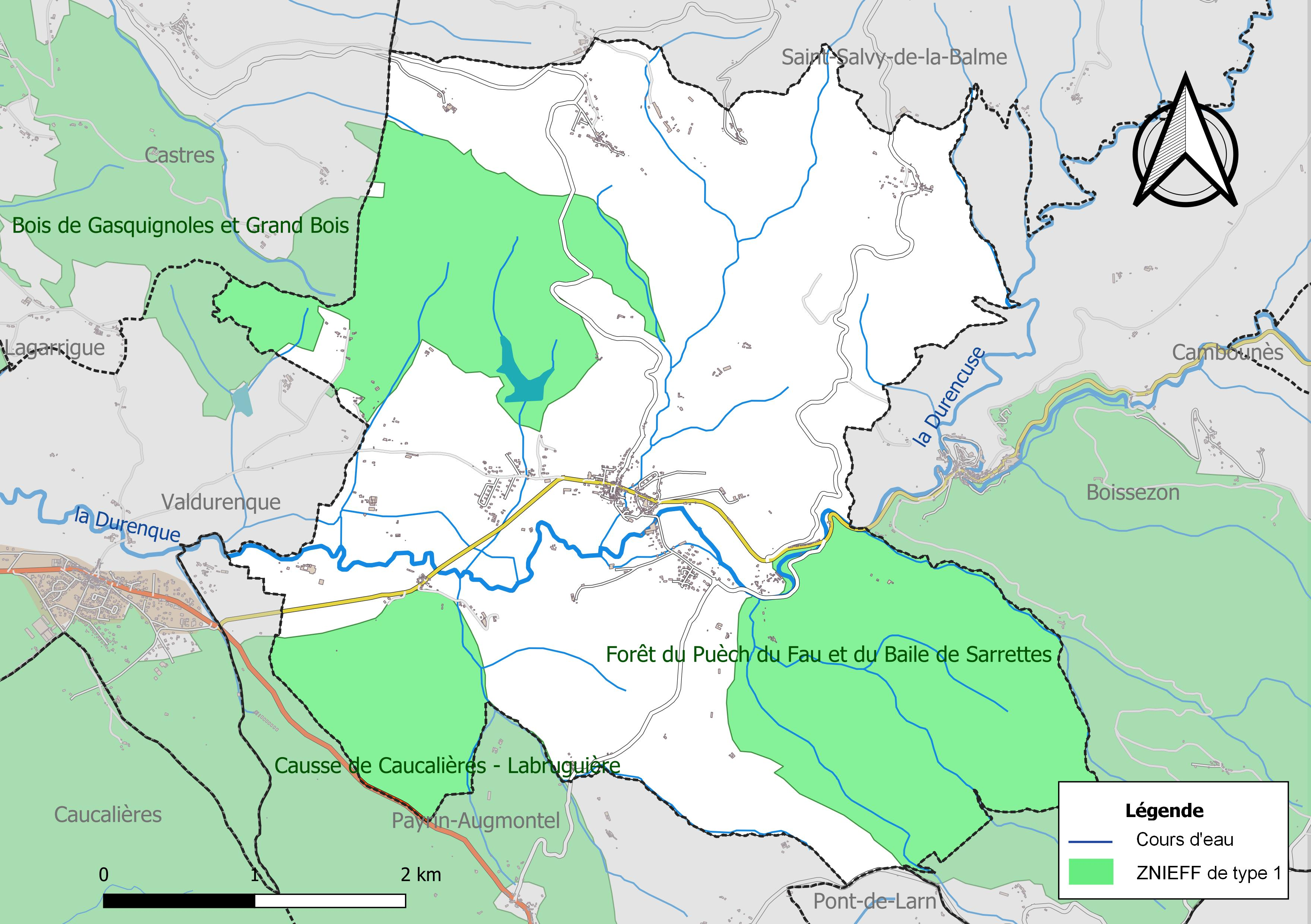
Map of type 1 ZNIEFFs located in the commune.

The inventory of natural areas of ecological, faunal, and floral interest (ZNIEFF) aims to cover the most ecologically interesting areas, primarily with the aim of improving knowledge of the national natural heritage and providing decision-makers with a tool to help them take environmental considerations into account in land use planning. Three type 1 ZNIEFFs are listed in the commune:

- the "Bois de Gasquignoles and Grand Bois" (570 ha), covering three communes in the department;
- the "Causse de Caucalières - Labruguière" (2,478 ha), covering seven communes in the department;
- the "Forêt du Puech du Fau et du Baile de Sarrettes" (1,110 ha), covering three communes in the department.

== Urban planning ==
=== Typology ===
As of January 1, 2024, Noailhac is categorized as a rural commune with dispersed housing, according to the new seven-level municipal density grid defined by INSEE in 2022. It is located outside an urban unit. Furthermore, the commune is part of the Castres catchment area, of which it is a suburban commune. This area, which includes 55 communes, is categorized in areas with 50,000 to less than 200,000 inhabitants.

=== Land use ===
The land use of the commune, as shown in the European biophysical land use database Corine Land Cover (CLC), is marked by the importance of forests and semi-natural environments (54.3% in 2018), a decrease compared to 1990 (56.1%). The detailed breakdown in 2018 is as follows: forests (52.2%), meadows (24.6%), heterogeneous agricultural areas (19.3%), environments with shrub and/or herbaceous vegetation (2%), urbanized areas (1.8%). The evolution of the land use of the commune and its infrastructure can be observed on the various cartographic representations of the territory: the Cassini map (18th century), the general staff map (1820-1866) and the IGN maps or aerial photos for the current period (1950 to today).

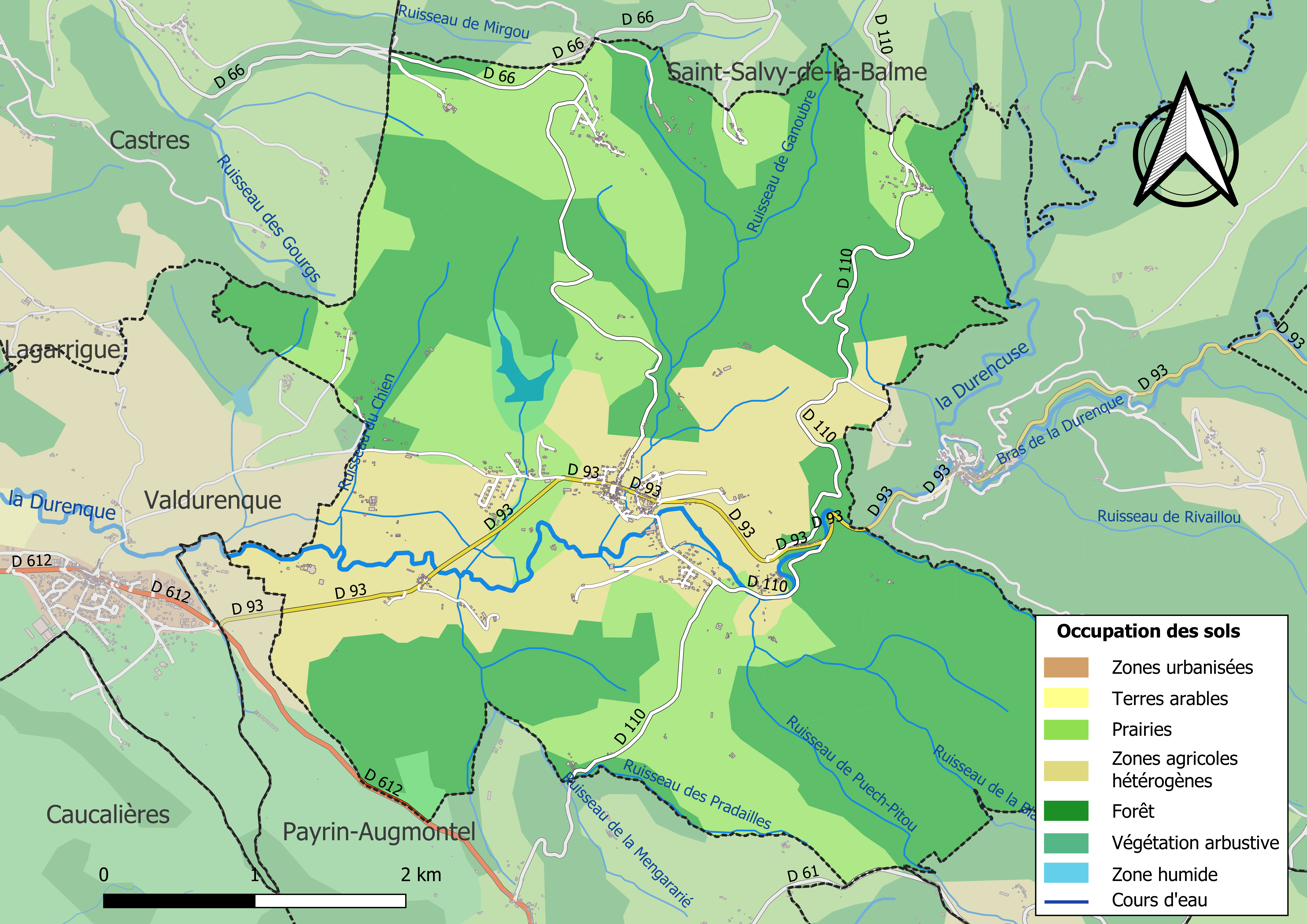
Map of infrastructure and land use in the commune in 2018 (CLC).

=== Major risks ===
The territory of the commune of Noailhac is vulnerable to various natural hazards: meteorological (storms, thunderstorms, snow, extreme cold, heatwave or drought), floods, forest fires, ground movements and earthquakes (very low seismicity). It is also exposed to a technological risk, the transport of dangerous materials, and to a particular risk: the risk of radon. A site published by the BRGM allows you to simply and quickly assess the risks of a property located either by its address or by the number of its plot.

==== Natural risks ====
Certain parts of the municipal territory are likely to be affected by the risk of flooding due to overflowing rivers, particularly the Durenque and Durencuse. The mapping of flood-prone areas in the former Midi-Pyrénées region, carried out as part of the 11th State-Region Plan Contract, aimed at informing citizens and decision-makers about flood risks, is available on the DREAL Occitanie website. The commune has been declared a state of natural disaster due to damage caused by floods and mudslides in 1982, 1992, 1999, 2013, 2018, 2019, and 2020.

Noailhac is exposed to the risk of forest fires. As of 2022, there is no Forest Fire Risk Prevention Plan (PPRif). Clearing brush around houses is one of the best protections for individuals against fire.

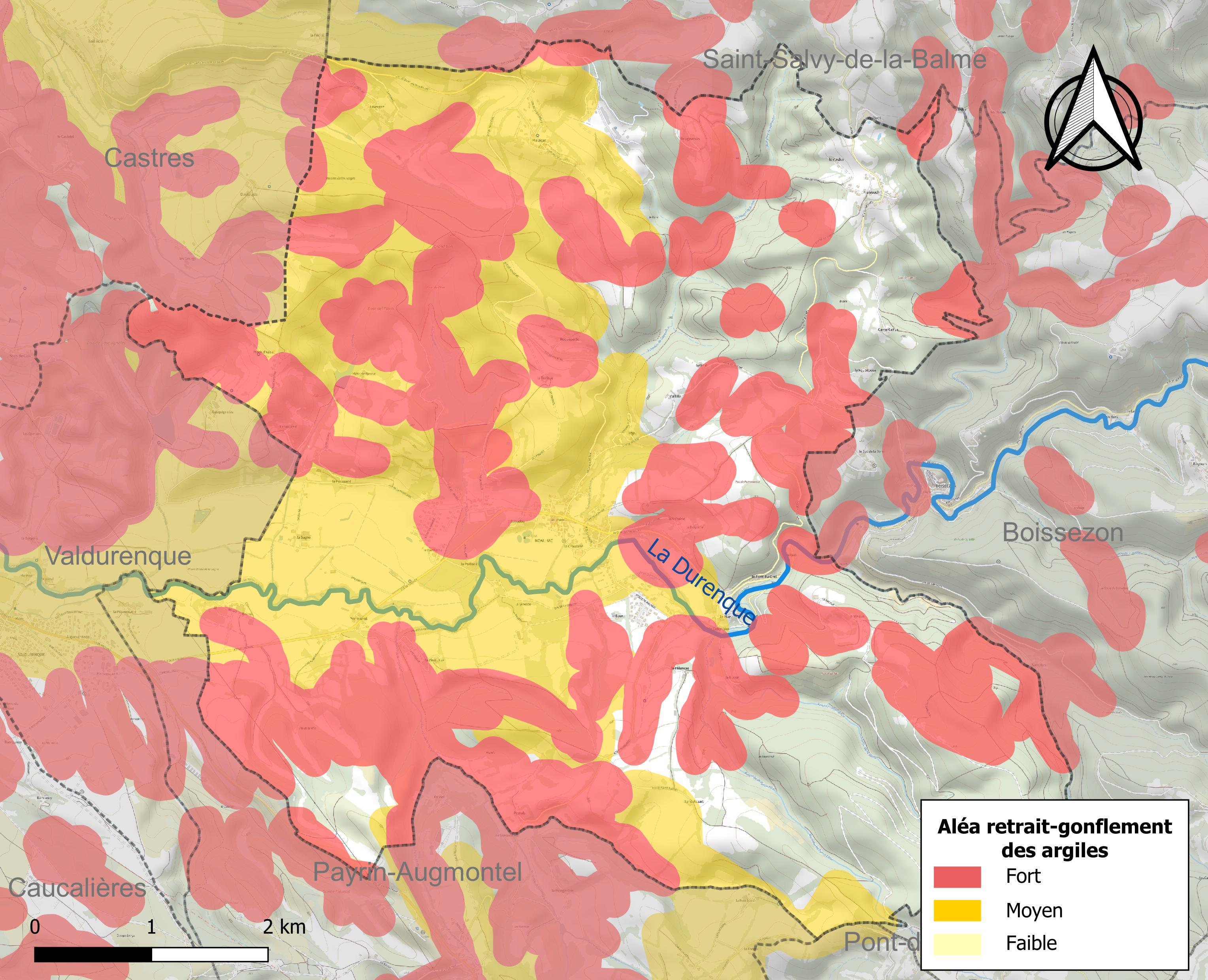
Map of the shrinkage-swelling hazard zones of clay soils in Noailhac.

The commune is vulnerable to the risk of ground movement, mainly due to the shrinkage and swelling of clay soils. This hazard is likely to cause significant damage to buildings in the event of alternating periods of drought and rain. 71.6% of the municipal area is at medium or high risk (76.3% at the departmental level and 48.5% at the national level). Of the 449 buildings counted in the commune in 2019, 366 are at medium or high risk, or 82%, compared to 90% at the departmental level and 54% at the national level. A map of the national territory's exposure to the shrinkage and swelling of clay soils is available on the BRGM website.

Furthermore, to better understand the risk of land subsidence, the national inventory of underground cavities allows us to locate those located in the commune.

==== Technological risks ====
The risk of hazardous materials being transported within the municipality is linked to its crossing by major road or rail infrastructure or the presence of a hydrocarbon transport pipeline. An accident occurring on such infrastructure is likely to have serious effects on property, people, or the environment, depending on the nature of the material being transported. Urban planning provisions may be recommended accordingly.

==== Special risk ====
In several parts of the country, radon, accumulated in certain homes or other premises, can constitute a significant source of exposure of the population to ionizing radiation. Some municipalities in the department are affected by radon risk to a greater or lesser extent. According to the 2018 classification, the commune of Noailhac is classified in zone 2, namely an area with low radon potential but where specific geological factors can facilitate the transfer of radon to buildings.

== History ==
Noailhac developed around the Notre-Dame de Noailhac church (listed as a historical monument in 1972), built in the 12th century. Noailhac was under the jurisdiction of the Benedictine convent of Castres (under the jurisdiction of the Abbey of Saint-Victor in Marseille) until 1317, when it became a cathedral chapter. The parish had two annexes during its history: Saint-Michel-de-Perrin (or Payrin, 1569) and Saint-Salvi-de-la-Balme (1682). A chaplaincy was established in the church in 1546, and it was restored in the 19th century.

An initial project to create the commune of Noailhac, from 1897 to 1902, failed due to an unfavorable opinion from the Council of State. In 1927, the government overruled a new unfavorable opinion and introduced the bill. A year later the parish of Noailhac was finally established as a commune at the expense of Boissezon, by virtue of a law of March 14 (JO of March 28, 1928).

== Economy ==
=== Income ===
In 2018, the commune had 379 tax households, comprising 857 people. The median disposable income per consumption unit is €20,840 (€20,400 in the department).

=== Employment ===
In 2018, the population aged 15 to 64 was 518, of which 79% were active (71.1% employed and 7.9% unemployed) and 21% were inactive. Since 2008, the municipal unemployment rate (as defined by the census) for 15-64 year-olds has been lower than that of France and the department.

The commune is part of the Castres catchment area, as at least 15% of the active population work in the area. It had 103 jobs in 2018, compared to 146 in 2013 and 161 in 2008. The number of employed people residing in the commune is 372, representing an employment concentration indicator of 27.9% and an employment rate among those aged 15 or over of 59.1%.

Of these 372 employed people aged 15 or over, 55 work in the commune, representing 15% of the population. To get to work, 93% of residents use a personal or company four-wheeled vehicle, 1.1% use public transport, 4% travel by two-wheeler, bicycle, or on foot, and 1.9% do not need transport (working from home).

=== Non-agricultural activities ===
==== Sectors of activity ====
51 establishments were located in Noailhac as of December 31, 2019. The table below details the number by sector of activity and compares the ratios with those of the department.

Sector of activity	Commune		Department
Sector of activity	Number	%	%
Set	51	100 %	(100 %)
Manufacturing, mining and other industries	6	11,8 %	(13 %)
Construction	12	23,5 %	(12,5 %)
Wholesale and retail trade, transport, accommodation and catering	8	15,7 %	(26,7 %)
Information and communication	3	5,9 %	(2,1 %)
Financial and insurance activities	1	2 %	(3,3 %)
Real estate activities	2	3,9 %	(4,2 %)
Specialized, scientific and technical activities and administrative and support service activities	7	13,7 %	(13,8 %)
Public administration, education, human health and social action	9	17,6 %	(15,5 %)
Other services and activities	3	5,9 %	(9 %)

The construction sector is predominant in the commune since it represents 23.5% of the total number of establishments in the commune (12 out of the 51 companies established in Noailhac), compared to 12.5% at the departmental level.

==== Businesses and commerce ====
The two companies headquartered in the commune that generated the most revenue in 2020 were:

- SAS Minage Travaux Publics & Speciaux - MTPS, specialized or large-scale earthworks (€5,398,000)
- Maison Gousto, food retailing at stalls and markets (€126,000)

=== Businesses and commerce ===
- A carpentry company and
- A general electrical company
- A plumbing company
- A painting company
- A granite specialist
- A hotel

=== Agriculture ===
The commune is in the "plain of Albigeois and Castrais", a small agricultural region occupying the center of the Tarn department. In 2020, the technical-economic orientation of agriculture in the commune is cattle breeding, mixed milk and meat orientation. Seven farms with their headquarters in the commune were counted during the 2020 agricultural census (26 in 1988). The used agricultural area is 639 ha.

=== Associations ===
- Noailhac Youth and Community Center: badminton, soccer, and Nordic walking;
- 4 Seasons Stables: horseback riding;
- The Leisure, Sports, and Culture Workshop: gymnastics, badminton, painting, theater, belote, and more.

== Culture and local heritage ==
=== Places and monuments ===
- Church of Our Lady of the Assumption in Noailhac. The West Portal was listed as a historic monument in 1972.
- Château de la Poussarié, a large brick mansion.

=== Personalities linked to the commune ===
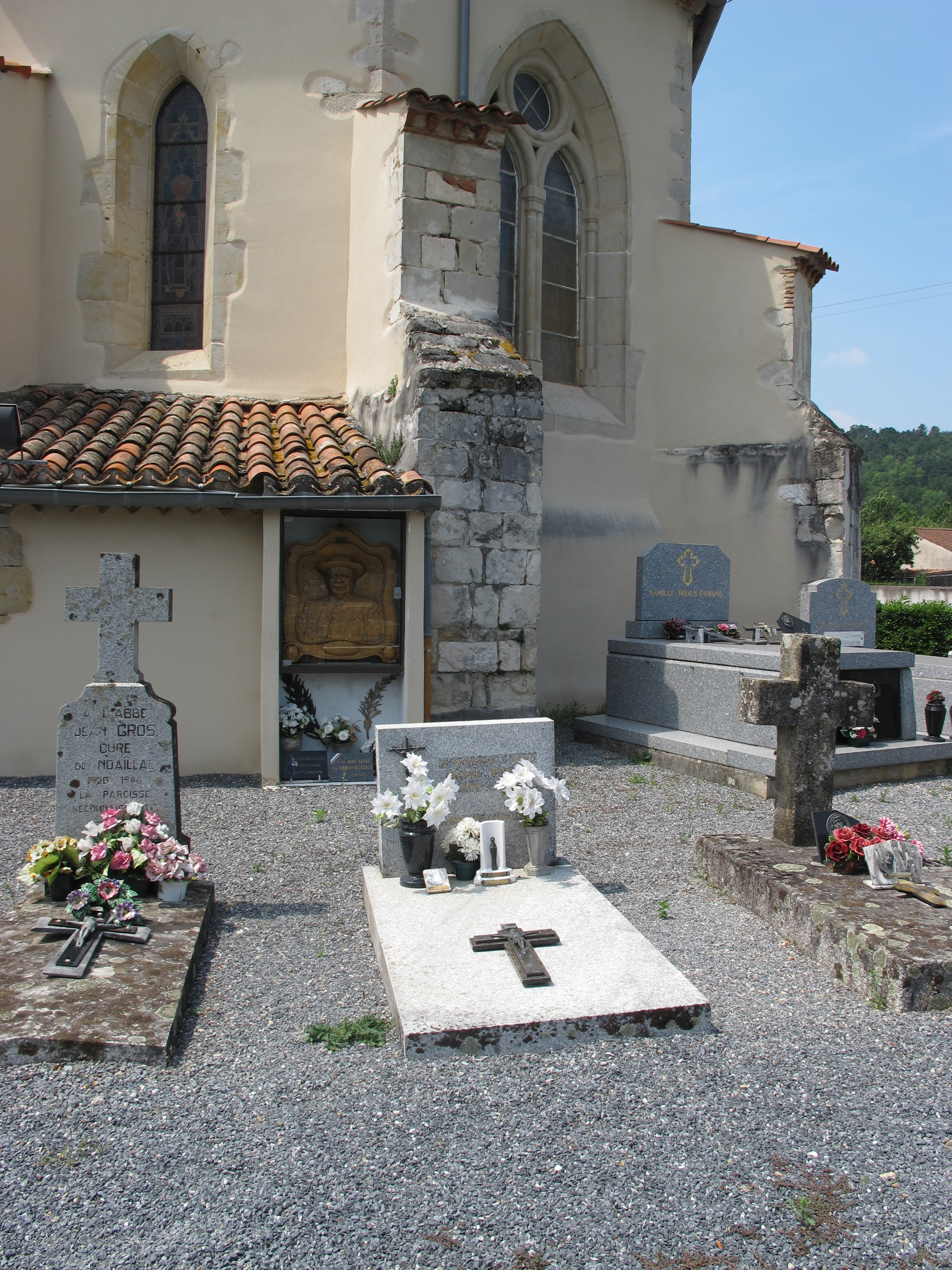
Tomb of Abbot Pistre located at the apse of the Notre-Dame de Noailhac church in the Tarn. The tomb indicates 1980 as the year of death.

Abbé Henri Pistre (born in 1900 in Mazamet, died in 1981 in Noailhac), nicknamed “the Pope of rugby”, parish priest of Noailhac from 1946 until his death.

=== Heraldry ===
Adopted on March 4, 2021.

Arms of Noailhac	Tierced in reversed pairle: 1st sinople with an axe and a pick argent, both fitted with or and crossed, 2nd gules with a cross keyed, hollowed and dappled of twelve gold pieces, 3rd argent with a wavy and lowered divide azure and a rose of the gardens gules, stemmed and leafed vert broaching.

== See also ==
- Communes of the Tarn department
