= Mazamet, a dead city =

1973 road safety campaign in France

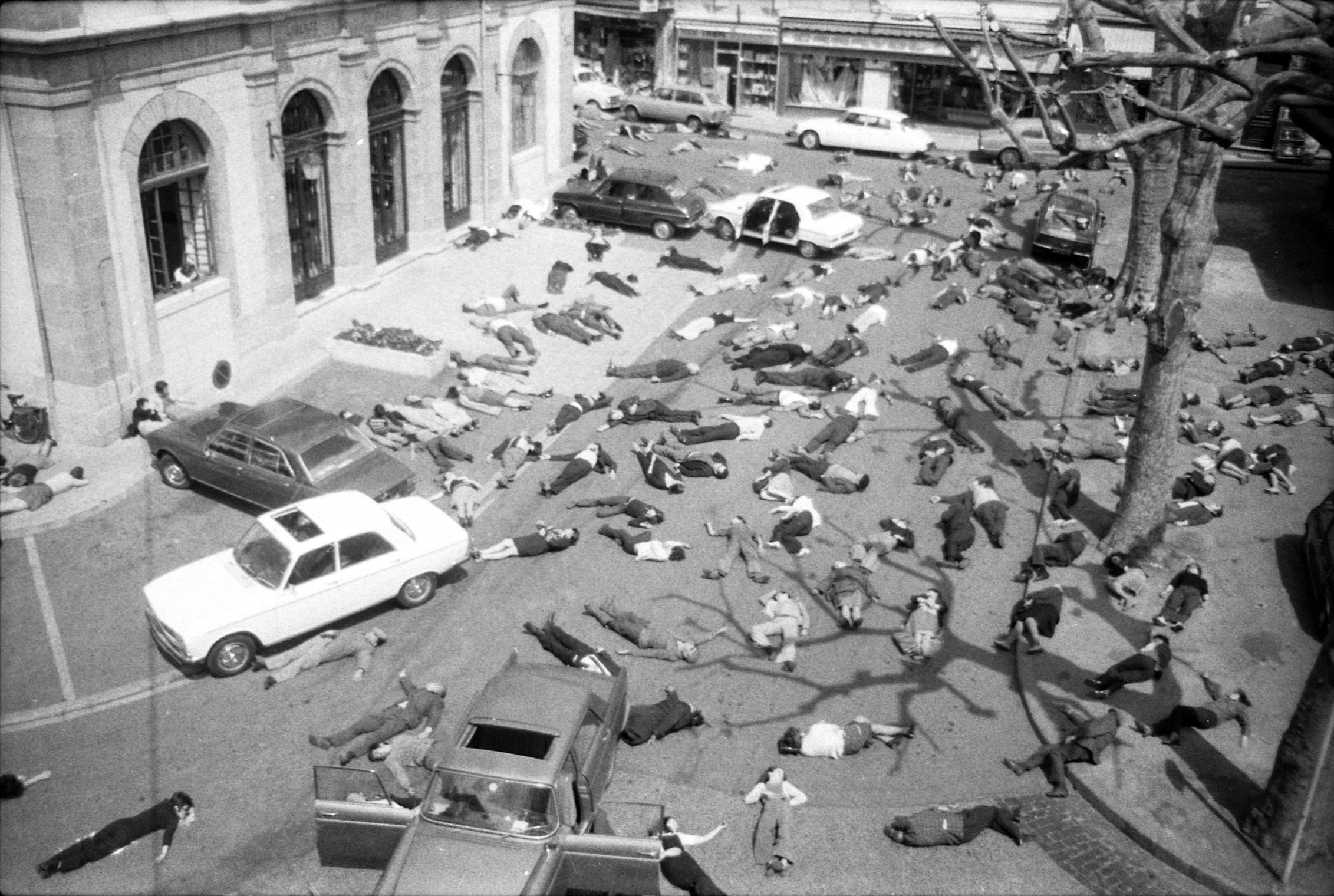
Shot of the “Mazamet ville morte” operation, the square in front of the town hall.

Mazamet, ville morte (French for Mazamet, dead city) is a road safety awareness campaign that took place on May 17, 1973 in Mazamet, in the departement of Tarn in the South-West of France. The 16,610 inhabitants of the city laid down on the streets for a few minutes to symbolize the 16,500 people killed in road accidents in France the previous year, a record year for road deaths in the country. The idea was the brainchild of ORTF journalist Michel Tauriac. with the support of the Comité interministériel de la sécurité routière (Interministerial Road Safety Committee), created the previous year, to visibly symbolize the country's road death tol. A documentary film of the operation, Mazamet, la ville rayée de la carte ("The town was wiped off the map") was made by Guy Seligmann and broadcast on television, to great acclaim.
