= Racing Club Aussillon Mazamet XIII =

French rugby league club

Club information
- Full name: Racing Club Aussillon Mazamet XIII
- Nickname(s): The Tarnais
- Founded: 1970; 55 years ago

Current details
- Ground(s): Stade Rene Carayon
- Competition: National Division 2 (Midi-Pyrenees Region)
- 2017/18: 3rd

Uniforms
Home colours

Racing Club Aussillon Mazamet XIII are a French Rugby league club based in Aussillon, Tarn in the Midi-Pyrénées region. The club plays in the Midi-Pyrenees regional National Division 2. RC Ausillon was founded in 1970 and merged with Mazamet in the early 1980s. The club plays home games at the Stade Rene Carayon.

In 2015, the club reached the final of the Coupe de France Albert-Falcou, but lost 22–21 to Saint-Laurent de la Cabrerisse.

== Club details ==
- Club Address: Racing Club Aussillon Mazamet XIII, local du Deves, 81200 Aussillon
