= Le Militarial =

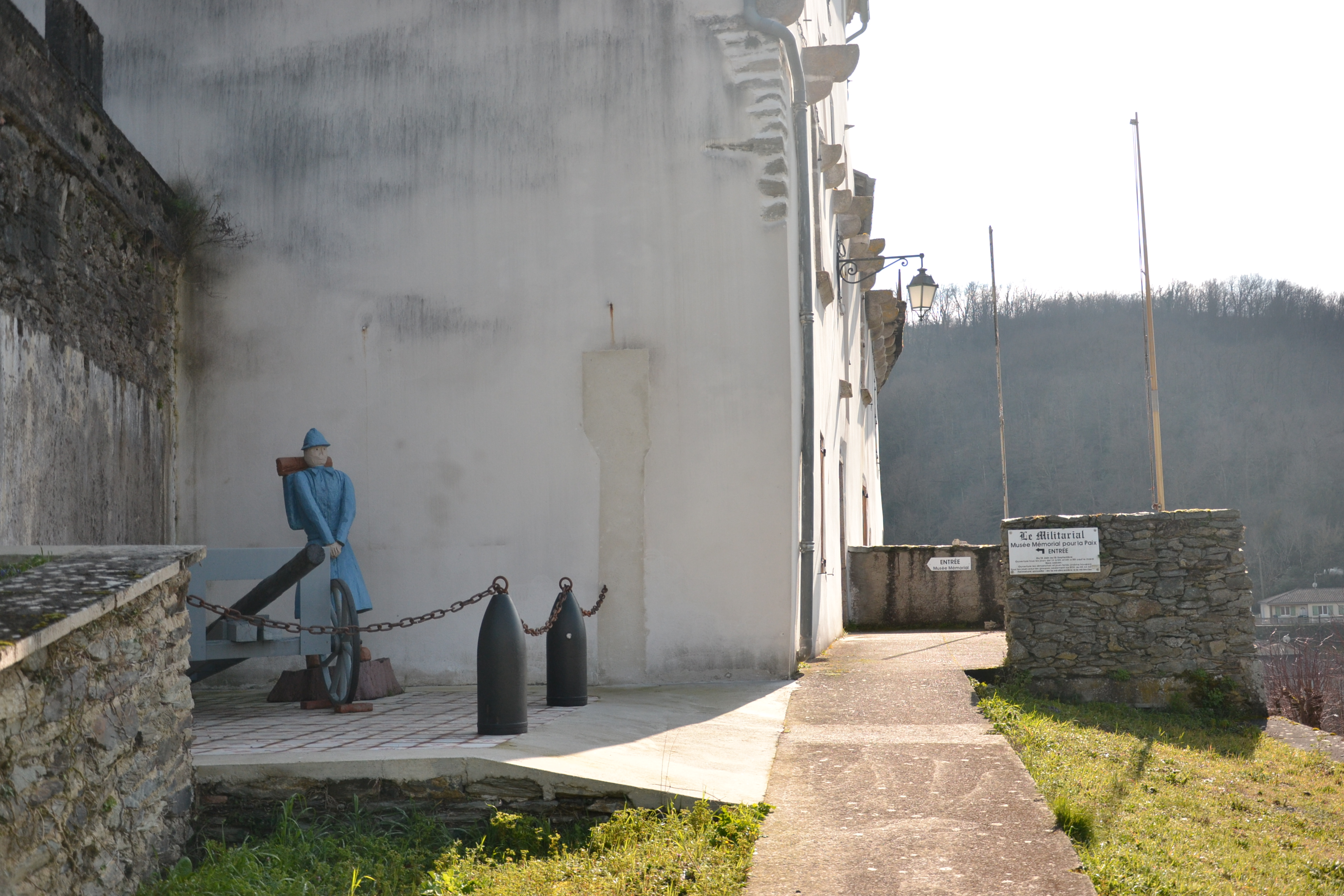
- Entrance of the museum
- Established: 1996
- Location: Tarn
- Type: Museum-Memorial for peace
- Director: Jean-Pierre Darmais

Le Militarial is a museum-memorial for peace located in Boissezon, in the Tarn, in the Occitanie region of France.

== Description ==
=== History ===
Created in 1996 in an old fort dating from the 11th century, the Militarial of Boissezon is the work of the local doctor Christian Bourdel (1941 - November 3, 2016). A great collector of military equipment, he also held the position of president and curator of the museum, as well as a general delegate of the French Remembrance Society · .

=== Organization and collections ===
The Militarial commemorates the armed conflicts of the wars of the 20th century, and the combatants who participated, as the first victims of these wars. The eight exhibition rooms thus present the First World War and Second World War, mainly through the Resistance and deportation for the latter; but also the Korean War, the Indochina War, and the Algerian War. With more than 5000 objects and nearly 10,000 books in the museum's library, the Militarial honors the duty of remembrance, while aiming to prevent future wars · .

The museum's collections include, among other things, demilitarized weapons, various explosives, uniforms, medical or communication equipment, propaganda posters, and more. One of the flagship objects is the satchel used by the Marshal Jean de Lattre de Tassigny during the signing of the 1945 armistice, a donation from the Rhin and Danube association. The museum-memorial is also a non-profit 1901 law association.

On February 26, 2018, the Militarial was the victim of a burglary, during which many demilitarized weapons were stolen.
