= Aiguefonde =

- Commune
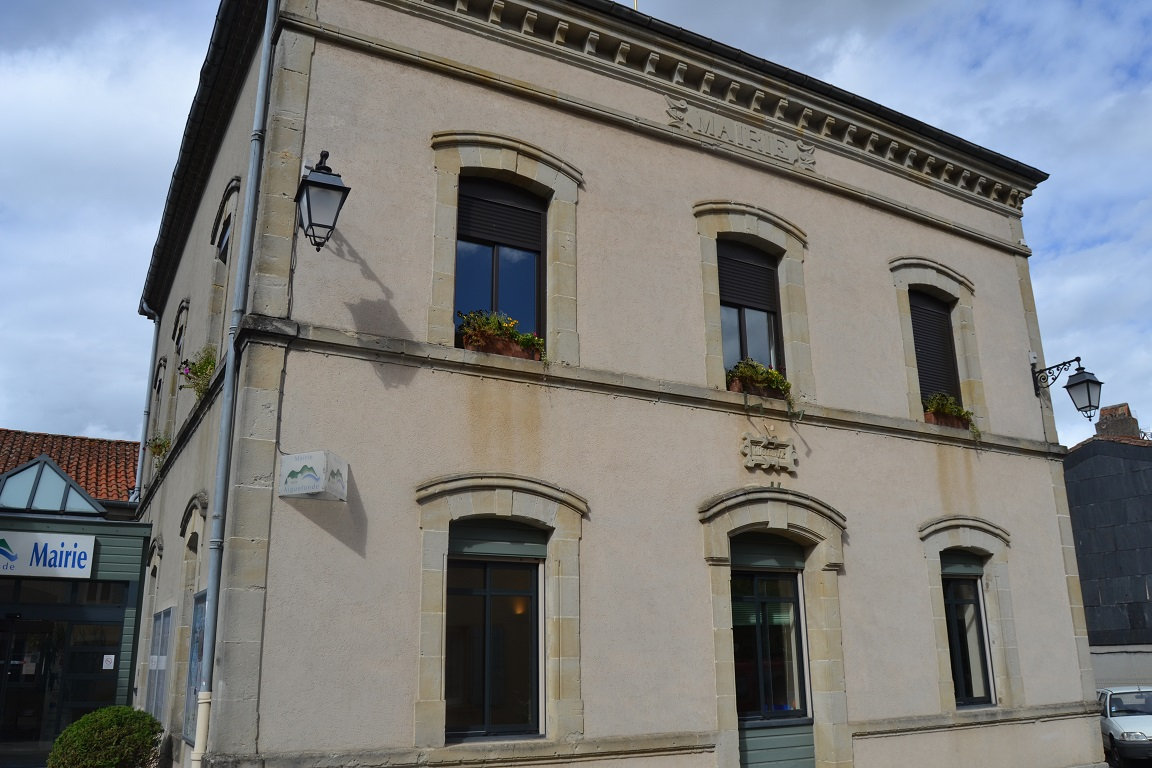
- The town hall of Aiguefonde

- Flag Coat of arms
- Location of Aiguefonde
- Location within France Location within Occitanie
- Coordinates: 43°29′38″N 2°19′01″E
- Country: France
- Region: Occitania
- Department: Tarn
- Arrondissement: Castres
- Canton: Mazamet-1
- Intercommunality: CA Castres Mazamet

Government
  - Mayor (2020–2026): Vincent Garel
- Area^{1}: 19.13 km^{2} (7.39 sq mi)
- Elevation: 200 m (660 ft)
- Highest elevation: 893 m (2,930 ft)
- Lowest elevation: 180 m (590 ft)
- Population (2023): 2,505
  - Density: 130.9/km^{2} (339.1/sq mi)
- Time zone: UTC+01:00 (CET)
  - Summer (DST): UTC+02:00 (CEST)
- INSEE/Postal code: 81002 /81200
- ^{1} French Land Register data, which excludes lakes, ponds, glaciers > 1 km^{2} (0.386 sq mi or 247 acres) and river estuaries.

Aiguefonde (French pronunciation: [ɛɡfɔ̃d]; Occitan: Aigafonda, meaning deep water) is a commune of the Tarn department in southern France.

== Geography ==
The Thoré forms part of the commune's northern border.

== Population ==
Historical population
Year	Pop.	±% p.a.
1968	2,068	—
1975	2,105	+0.25%
1982	2,588	+2.99%
1990	2,752	+0.77%
1999	2,631	−0.50%
2007	2,701	+0.33%
2012	2,626	−0.56%
2017	2,517	−0.84%
2023	2,505	−0.08%
Source: INSEE

== See also ==
- Communes of the Tarn department
