= Lagarrigue, Tarn =

Lagarrigue
- Commune
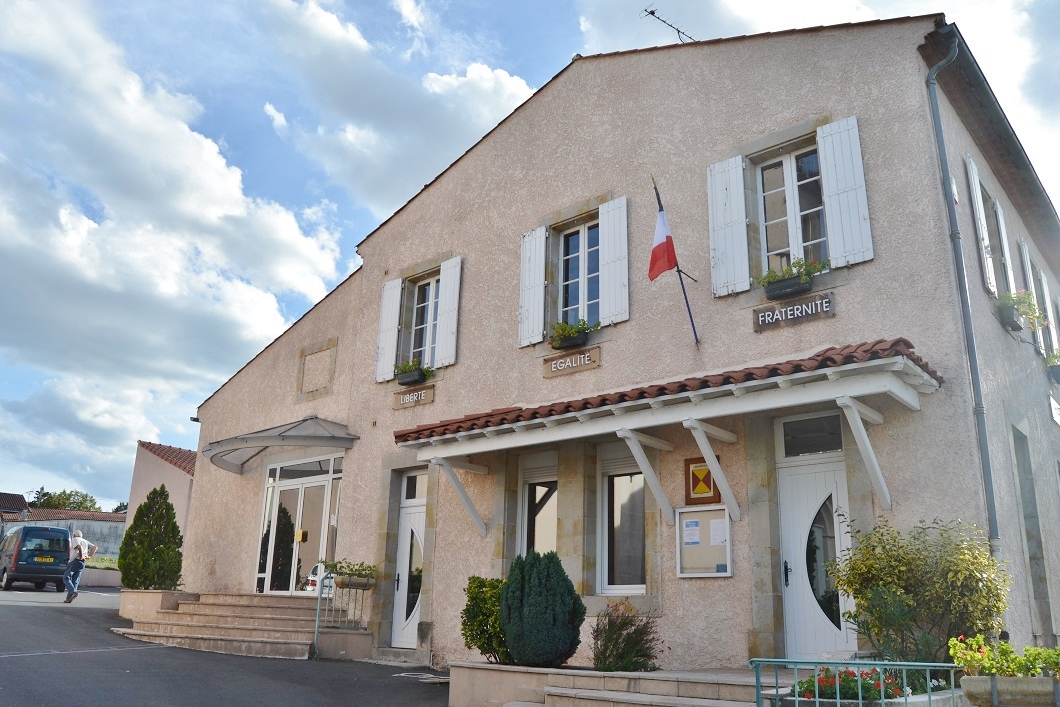

- Coat of arms
- Location of Lagarrigue
- Location within France Location within Occitanie
- Coordinates: 43°34′39″N 2°16′37″E
- Country: France
- Region: Occitania
- Department: Tarn
- Arrondissement: Castres
- Canton: Mazamet-1
- Intercommunality: CA Castres Mazamet

Government
  - Mayor (2020–2026): Vincent Colom
- Area^{1}: 4.86 km^{2} (1.88 sq mi)
- Elevation: 190 m (620 ft)
- Highest elevation: 266 m (873 ft)
- Lowest elevation: 185 m (607 ft)
- Population (2023): 1,784
  - Density: 367/km^{2} (951/sq mi)
- Time zone: UTC+01:00 (CET)
  - Summer (DST): UTC+02:00 (CEST)
- INSEE/Postal code: 81130 /81090
- ^{1} French Land Register data, which excludes lakes, ponds, glaciers > 1 km^{2} (0.386 sq mi or 247 acres) and river estuaries.

Lagarrigue (French pronunciation: [laɡaʁiɡ]; Occitan: La Garriga) is a commune in the Tarn, department in southern France.

Inhabitants are called "Lagarriguois".

== History ==
The commune is quoted in 1272 in a charter of Gaix's castle. In 1629, Louis de Cardaillac created an independent consulate in the town.

== Economy ==
There is a part of Castres-Mazamet airport on the commune.

== Monuments ==
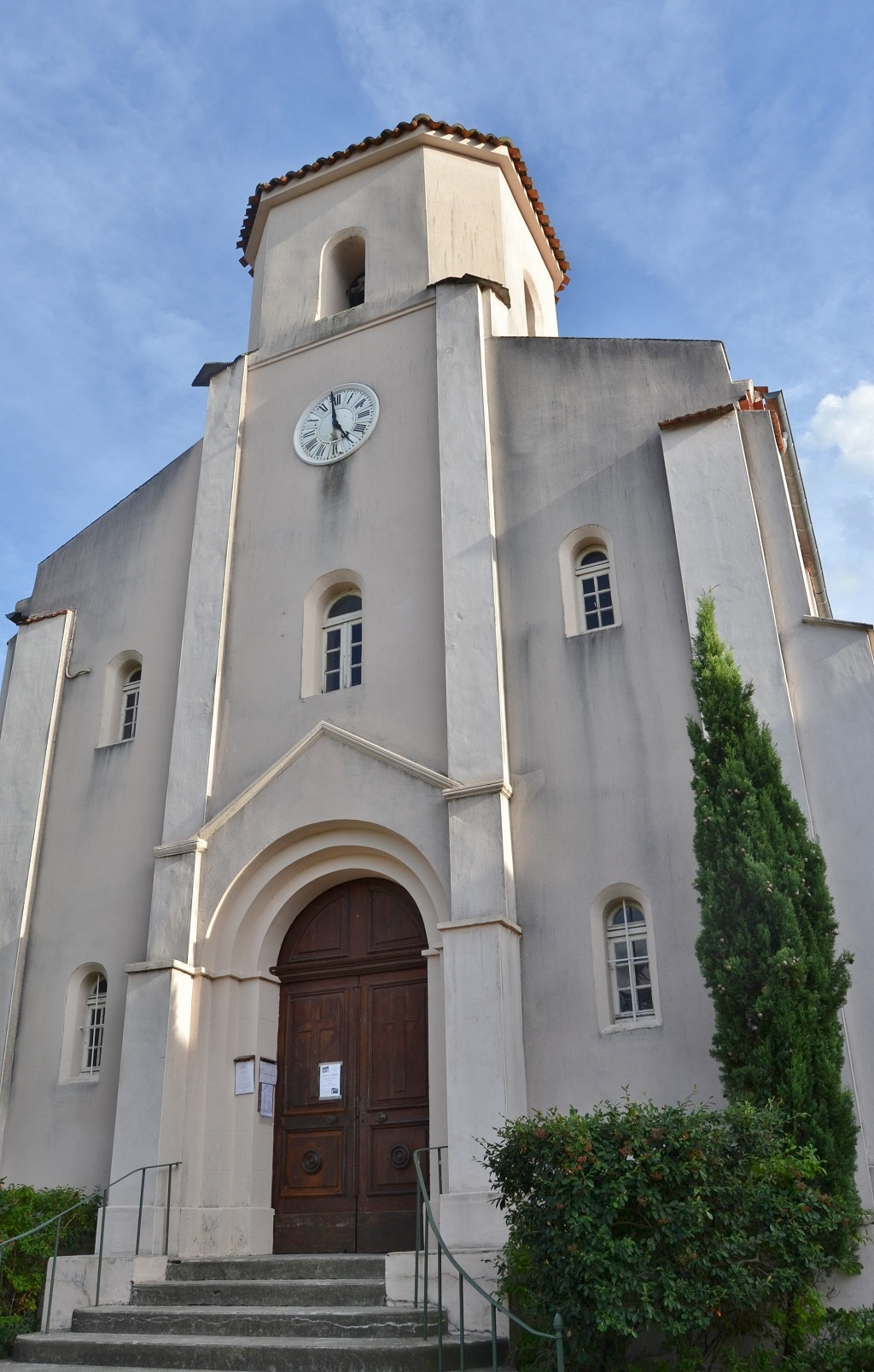
The church

== Personalities ==
- Claude Puel, a French football player and manager;
- Guillaume Borne, a French football player.

== See also ==
- Communes of the Tarn department
