= Pierre Bernard (footballer) =

French footballer (1932–2014)

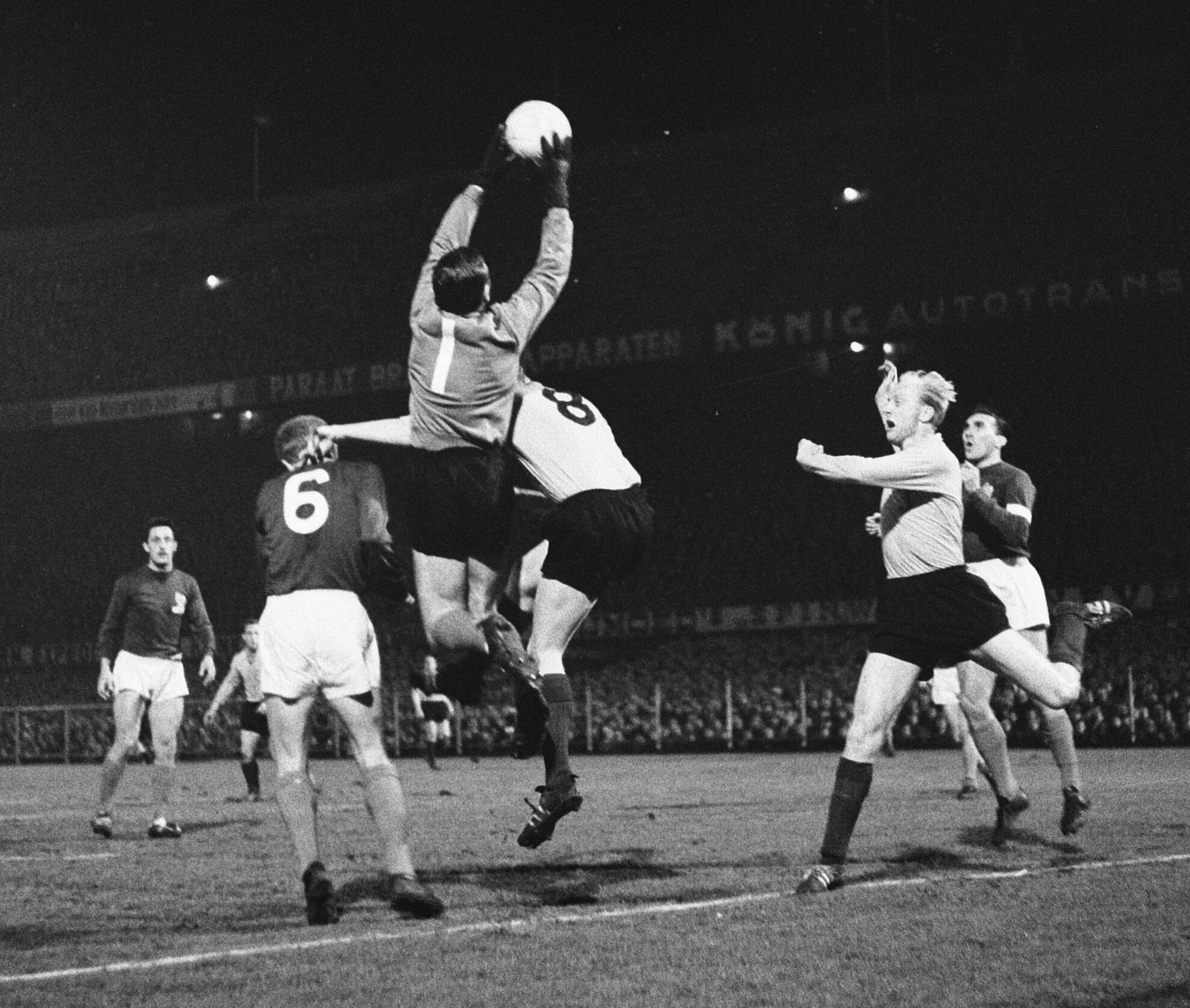
- Bernard (1963)

Personal information
- Place of birth: Boissezon, France
- Date of death: 28 May 2014 (aged 81)
- Height: 1.75 m (5 ft 9 in)
- Position: Goalkeeper

Senior career*
Years	Team	Apps	(Gls)
1952–1957	Bordeaux		
1957–1961	Sedan		
1961–1963	Nîmes		
1963–1967	Saint-Étienne		
1967–1969	Red Star		

International career
1960–1965	France	21	(0)
- * Club domestic league appearances and goals

Pierre Bernard (27 June 1932 – 28 May 2014) was a French footballer who played as a goalkeeper. He made 21 appearances for the France national team.
