= Étienne Noël Damilaville =

French man of letters and friend of Voltaire, Diderot and d'Alembert

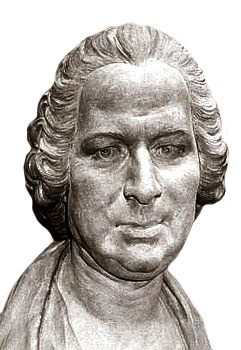
- Buste présumé d'Étienne Noël Damilaville, Marie-Anne Collot ; Musée du Louvre.
- Born: 21 November 1723; Bordeaux, Gascony
- Died: 13 December 1768 (aged 45); Paris
- Occupation: Encyclopédiste

Étienne Noël Damilaville (21 November 1723 – 13 December 1768) was an 18th-century French man of letters, friend of Voltaire, Diderot and d'Alembert. He served in various military and administrative functions of the Ancien Régime. He was a member of the bodyguard of King Louis XV, and then a senior civil servant in the tax office responsible for supervising the Vingtième. His official roles meant that his correspondence was unexamined by censors, enabling him to circulate letters between leading thinkers of the day, most particularly during the Sirven affair.

== Biography ==
Damilaville was likely born in a Norman village where his brother controlled the vingtième (5% tax). He joined the army during the War of the Austrian Succession as part of the Gardes de Corps. He then worked as a lawyer and became the controller-general of finance, and by 1755, was an administrator of the tax. His religious heterodoxy is thought to have come in the way of his career advancement.

== The Encyclopédie ==
Damilaville authored three articles in the Encyclopédie - Population, Peace and The Vingtième.

== Vingtieme ==
Damilaville is believed to have coauthored an article in the Encyclopédie on the Vingtieme tax regime with Diderot, his trusted associate. His treatise is largely a discussion on the nature of government, of civil society and of the economy. Like Montesquie, Damilaville makes a clear distinction between the state, as an aggregate of people in society, and government. The treatise uses this dichotomy between the state and government to rationalize the necessity of taxes; however, Damilaville also argues tax simplification or reform. What is important in his contention for tax simplification is the purpose of having or raising taxes on participants in society. According to Damilaville, tax burdens should not be understood in terms of ratios of an individual's income, rather through the ratio of taxes that concern an individual's sustenance after their monies have been deducted.

== Friendship with Voltaire ==
Voltaire regarded him as a very close friend, and wrote him at least 539 letters over eight years. They only actually met, for the first time, after they had been corresponding for five years, on 20 August 1765, when Damilaville visited Ferney. Voltaire described him as having a “soul of bronze—equally tender and solid for his friends.”

Opinion of Damilaville was not universally positive: Melchior Grimm said of him:

He had neither grace, nor mental wit, and he lacked the worldly savoir-faire which makes up for it. He was sad and heavy, and his lack of basic education always showed through.

== Bibliography ==
- Emmanuel Boussuge et Françoise Launay, "L'ami D'Amilaville", Recherches sur Diderot et sur l'Encyclopédie, 2014, n° 49, (p. 25–41).
- Emmanuel Boussuge et Françoise Launay, "Étienne Noël D'Amilaville (1723–1768)", Les collaborateurs de l'Encyclopédie, projet d'Édition Numérique Collaborative et Critique de l'Encyclopédie (6 January 2015)
