= Caucalières =

- Commune
- Coat of arms
- Location of Caucalières
- Location within France Location within Occitanie
- Coordinates: 43°31′23″N 2°18′45″E
- Country: France
- Region: Occitania
- Department: Tarn
- Arrondissement: Castres
- Canton: Mazamet-1
- Intercommunality: CA Castres Mazamet

Government
  - Mayor (2020–2026): Yohan Ziegler
- Area^{1}: 12.8 km^{2} (4.9 sq mi)
- Elevation: 194 m (636 ft)
- Highest elevation: 324 m (1,063 ft)
- Lowest elevation: 178 m (584 ft)
- Population (2023): 286
  - Density: 22.3/km^{2} (57.9/sq mi)
- Time zone: UTC+01:00 (CET)
  - Summer (DST): UTC+02:00 (CEST)
- INSEE/Postal code: 81066 /81200
- ^{1} French Land Register data, which excludes lakes, ponds, glaciers > 1 km^{2} (0.386 sq mi or 247 acres) and river estuaries.

Caucalières (French pronunciation: [kokaljɛʁ]; Occitan: Caucalièira) is a commune in the Tarn department in southern France.

== Geography ==
The Thoré forms most of the commune's southern border.

== See also ==
- Communes of the Tarn department
