= Communauté d'agglomération de Castres Mazamet =

Castres Mazamet
- Communauté d'agglomération
- Interactive map of Castres Mazamet
- Coordinates: 43°33′N 02°19′E
- Country: France
- Region: Occitania
- Department: Tarn
- No. of communes: {{{nbcomm}}}
- Established: 1999
- Area: 406.1 km^{2} (156.8 sq mi)
- Population (2019): 78,275
  - Density: 192.7/km^{2} (499.2/sq mi)
- Website: www.castres-mazamet.fr

Communauté d'agglomération de Castres Mazamet is the communauté d'agglomération, an intercommunal structure, centred on the city of Castres. It is located in the Tarn department, in the Occitania region, southern France. Created in 1999, its seat is in Castres. Its area is 406.1 km^{2}. Its population was 78,275 in 2019, of which 42,079 in Castres proper.

== Composition ==
The communauté d'agglomération consists of the following 14 communes:

1. Aiguefonde
2. Aussillon
3. Boissezon
4. Castres
5. Caucalières
6. Labruguière
7. Lagarrigue
8. Mazamet
9. Navès
10. Noailhac
11. Payrin-Augmontel
12. Pont-de-Larn
13. Saint-Amans-Soult
14. Valdurenque
