= Canton of Mazamet-1 =

Coordinates: 43.49°N 2.37°E

The canton of Mazamet-1 is an administrative division of the Tarn department, southern France. It was created at the French canton reorganisation which came into effect in March 2015. Its seat is in Mazamet.

It consists of the following communes:

1. Aiguefonde
2. Aussillon
3. Boissezon
4. Caucalières
5. Lagarrigue
6. Mazamet (partly)
7. Noailhac
8. Payrin-Augmontel
9. Valdurenque
