= Pierre-Paul Sirven =

Pierre-Paul Sirven (1709–1777) is one of Voltaire's causes célèbres in his campaign to écraser l'infâme (crush infamy).

== Background ==
Sirven became an archivist and notary in Castres, southern France, in 1736. He was a Protestant with three daughters; the middle one, Elizabeth, was mentally handicapped.

Protestants were subject to serious legal and social restrictions in France at the time and were frequently persecuted by the authorities, often on flimsy pretexts. The case of Jean Calas, the subject of another of Voltaire's campaigns, had shown that legal authorities were fully prepared to ignore basic principles of law and justice in acting against members of the minority religion. The Toulouse parlement (high court) which took the decision in the Calas case also had jurisdiction over the authorities that would eventually try Sirven.

Elizabeth disappeared on 6 March 1760, aged 21. After having searched for her without success, Sirven learned that she had been taken into the convent of the Dames Noires (the ‘black ladies’, a convent founded in 1686 to keep daughters of Protestants sent to them under a lettre de cachet, the infamous means by which certain persons in authority could lock away those against whom they had a grudge, without trial or appeal). On 9 October 1760, Elizabeth suffered such a mental breakdown as a result of the ill treatment she received from the Dames Noires that they released her.

Sirven was so angry over the state of his daughter that he publicly denounced her treatment by the Dames Noires. They retaliated with a lawsuit accusing him of mistreating his daughter in order to prevent her conversion to Catholicism. They obtained an order against Sirven to allow Elizabeth free access to the convent and to accompany her himself to the services.

At the end of August 1761, the Sirven family moved to Saint Alby, near Mazamet, to avoid further persecution. On 16 December, Elizabeth disappeared again. Two weeks of searching yielded no results but on 3 January 1762 three children found her body down a well.

Initially medical examinations found that she had suffered no violence but, under pressure from the public prosecutor Trinquier of Mazamet, they changed their evidence to say that Elizabeth had not died by drowning. A warrant for Sirven's arrest was issued on 20 January 1762, but the family was able to escape in time. A sentence passed on them in absentia on 29 March 1764 condemned the father to be broken on the wheel, the mother to be hanged and the two surviving daughters to be banished. Their effigies were burned in Mazamet on 11 September 1764.

== Appeal to Voltaire ==
The Sirven family took refuge in Lausanne and made contact with Voltaire. Though he was already heavily embroiled in the case to clear Calas's name, he reacted to the Sirven case with the same anger as he had to the earlier one. On 30 March 1765, he wrote to Damilaville (Voltaire Foundation Complete Edition, letter D12511):

J'attends tous les jours à Toulouse la copie authentique de l'arrêt qui condamne toute la famille Sirven; arrêt confirmatif de la sentence rendue par un juge de village; arrêt donné sans connaissance de cause; arrêt contre lequel tout le public se souléverait avec indignation si les Calas ne s'étaient pas emparés de toute sa pitié.

I am expecting to receive from Toulouse any day now an authentic copy of the decree condemning the entire Sirven family; a decree confirming the sentence pronounced by a village judge; a decree issued without knowledge of the case; a decree against which the whole public would rise in indignation if the Calas family had not already won all its pity.

Étienne Noël Damilaville (1723-1768) was a valuable ally of Voltaire and the philosophes: as a clerk in the revenue service (Bureau du Vingtième) he could use the minister's seal on correspondence, ensuring its immunity from censorship. Voltaire used him heavily as an agent in his campaign to support the Sirven family in its legal proceedings.

As well as legal acton, Voltaire came to Sirven's assistance with his most powerful weapon, his pen. In June 1766, he published his Avis au public sur les parricides imputés aux Calas et aux Sirven (Notice to the public concerning the parricides alleged against the Calas and Sirven families). He despatched the pamphlet, along with a published version of a letter of his to Damilaville of 1 March 1765, to influential figures in France and abroad, to build the pressure on the authorities to act.

It still took until 23 January 1768 to persuade the Conseil du Roi (Royal Council) to consider the case, and Sirven's plea was rejected. The ministers of the king were afraid of appearing to limit the prerogatives of the provincial courts.

== Rehabilitation ==
The next stage required Sirven to take a serious risk and give himself up to the authorities, remembering that those same authorities had broken and killed Calas on the wheel when they had him in their power. He returned to Mazamet in 1769 and was remanded in custody to await the decision of the Toulouse parlement.

The mood in Toulouse had changed radically since the Calas case, partly in response to the public outcry over that case, partly as a result of the formation of the more liberal ministry in Paris headed by Maupeou. Sirven was released in December 1769 and on 25 November 1771 the Toulouse parlement overturned the original sentence, rehabilitated the entire Sirven family and ordered the town of Mazamet to pay compensation.

Sirven wrote to Voltaire on 27 November (D17479):

Je vous dois la vie, et plus que cela le rétablissement de mon honneur, et de ma réputation. Le parlement me jugea avant hier. Il a purgé la mémoire de feue mon épouse et nous a relaxés de l'indigne accusation imaginée par les fanatiques Castrois, m'a accordé la main levée des biens et effets saisis, avec restitution des fruits, et m'a accordé les dépens. […] Votre nom Monsieur, et l'intérêt que vous preniés à ma cause ont été d'un grand poids. Vous m'aviés jugé et le public instruit n'a pas osé penser autrement que vous, en éclairant les hommes vous êtes parvenu à les rendre humains.

I owe you my life, and more still, the restoration of my honour, and of my reputation. The parlement judged my case the day before yesterday. It has cleared the memory of my late wife and acquitted us of the unworthy accusation dreamed up by the fanatics of Castres, awarded me freely the goods and effects that had been seized, with interest, and awarded me my costs. […] Your name Sir, and the interest that you took in my case have had great weight. You judged my case and the informed public did not dare think differently from you, by enlightening people you have succeeded in making them human.

At the time that Sirven was finally exonerated, Voltaire was already 77, making the energy and tenacity of his campaign all the more remarkable.
