= Valdurenque =

- Commune
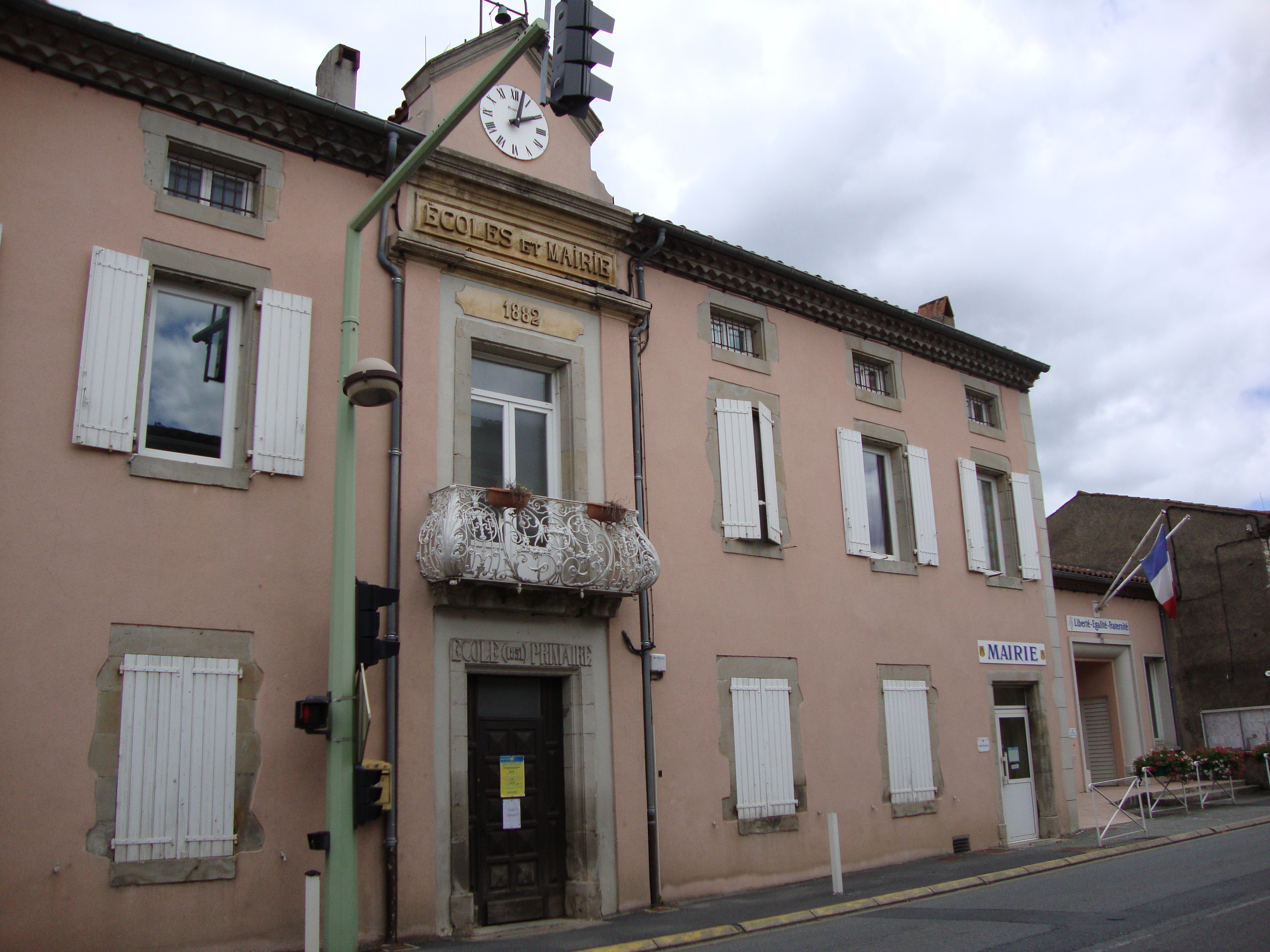
- The school and town hall in Valdurenque

- Coat of arms
- Location of Valdurenque
- Location within France Location within Occitanie
- Coordinates: 43°34′08″N 2°18′32″E
- Country: France
- Region: Occitania
- Department: Tarn
- Arrondissement: Castres
- Canton: Mazamet-1
- Intercommunality: CA Castres Mazamet

Government
  - Mayor (2020–2026): Jean-Louis Battut
- Area^{1}: 5.99 km^{2} (2.31 sq mi)
- Elevation: 200 m (660 ft)
- Highest elevation: 329 m (1,079 ft)
- Lowest elevation: 191 m (627 ft)
- Population (2023): 885
  - Density: 148/km^{2} (383/sq mi)
- Time zone: UTC+01:00 (CET)
  - Summer (DST): UTC+02:00 (CEST)
- INSEE/Postal code: 81307 /81090
- ^{1} French Land Register data, which excludes lakes, ponds, glaciers > 1 km^{2} (0.386 sq mi or 247 acres) and river estuaries.

Valdurenque (French pronunciation: [valdyʁɑ̃k]; Occitan: Val Durenca) is a commune in the Tarn department in southern France.

== See also ==
- Communes of the Tarn department
