= Aussillon =

- Commune
- Coat of arms
- Location of Aussillon
- Location within France Location within Occitanie
- Coordinates: 43°29′56″N 2°21′57″E
- Country: France
- Region: Occitania
- Department: Tarn
- Arrondissement: Castres
- Canton: Mazamet-1
- Intercommunality: CA Castres Mazamet

Government
  - Mayor (2020–2026): Fabrice Cabral
- Area^{1}: 10.26 km^{2} (3.96 sq mi)
- Elevation: 330 m (1,080 ft)
- Highest elevation: 805 m (2,641 ft)
- Lowest elevation: 198 m (650 ft)
- Population (2023): 5,527
  - Density: 538.7/km^{2} (1,395/sq mi)
- Time zone: UTC+01:00 (CET)
  - Summer (DST): UTC+02:00 (CEST)
- INSEE/Postal code: 81021 /81200
- ^{1} French Land Register data, which excludes lakes, ponds, glaciers > 1 km^{2} (0.386 sq mi or 247 acres) and river estuaries.

Aussillon is a commune in the Tarn department and Occitanie region of southern France.

== Geography ==
The Thoré forms the commune's northern border.

=== Château du Thoré ===
The Château du Thoré is a large country house built in 1893–4 for Armand Puech, industrialist and inventor of a water filtration system. Surrounded by a very large park, the house is still inhabited today.

== Population ==
Its inhabitants are called Aussillonnais in French.

Historical population
Year	Pop.	±% p.a.
1968	6,663	—
1975	8,383	+3.33%
1982	8,178	−0.35%
1990	7,673	−0.79%
1999	6,865	−1.23%
2007	6,674	−0.35%
2012	6,167	−1.57%
2017	5,892	−0.91%
2023	5,527	−1.06%
Source: INSEE

== See also ==
- Communes of the Tarn department
