= Payrin-Augmontel =

- Commune
- Coat of arms
- Location of Payrin-Augmontel
- Location within France Location within Occitanie
- Coordinates: 43°31′08″N 2°20′56″E
- Country: France
- Region: Occitania
- Department: Tarn
- Arrondissement: Castres
- Canton: Mazamet-1
- Intercommunality: CA Castres Mazamet

Government
  - Mayor (2020–2026): Christophe Mounié
- Area^{1}: 12.84 km^{2} (4.96 sq mi)
- Elevation: 225 m (738 ft)
- Highest elevation: 370 m (1,210 ft)
- Lowest elevation: 185 m (607 ft)
- Population (2023): 2,198
  - Density: 171.2/km^{2} (443.4/sq mi)
- Time zone: UTC+01:00 (CET)
  - Summer (DST): UTC+02:00 (CEST)
- INSEE/Postal code: 81204 /81660
- ^{1} French Land Register data, which excludes lakes, ponds, glaciers > 1 km^{2} (0.386 sq mi or 247 acres) and river estuaries.

Payrin-Augmontel (French pronunciation: [pɛʁɛ̃ oɡmɔ̃tɛl]; Occitan: Pairin e Aut Montel) is a commune in the Tarn department in southern France.

== Geography ==
The Espinat forms most of the commune's eastern border, then flows into the Thoré, which forms the commune's southern border.

== Population ==
Historical population
Year	Pop.	±% p.a.
1968	1,208	—
1975	1,452	+2.66%
1982	1,752	+2.72%
1990	2,028	+1.85%
1999	2,002	−0.14%
2007	2,145	+0.87%
2012	2,201	+0.52%
2017	2,168	−0.30%
2023	2,198	+0.23%
Source: INSEE

== See also ==
- Communes of the Tarn department
