= Boissezon =

- Commune
- Coat of arms
- Location of Boissezon
- Location within France Location within Occitanie
- Coordinates: 43°34′34″N 2°22′53″E
- Country: France
- Region: Occitania
- Department: Tarn
- Arrondissement: Castres
- Canton: Mazamet-1
- Intercommunality: CA Castres Mazamet

Government
  - Mayor (2020–2026): Jacqueline Cabrol
- Area^{1}: 19.0 km^{2} (7.3 sq mi)
- Population (2023): 398
  - Density: 20.9/km^{2} (54.3/sq mi)
- Time zone: UTC+01:00 (CET)
  - Summer (DST): UTC+02:00 (CEST)
- INSEE/Postal code: 81034 /81490
- ^{1} French Land Register data, which excludes lakes, ponds, glaciers > 1 km^{2} (0.386 sq mi or 247 acres) and river estuaries.

Boissezon (French pronunciation: [bwasəzɔ̃]; Occitan: Boisseson) is a commune in the Tarn department in southern France. Its inhabitants are known in French as Boissezonnais or as Boissesonols.

The village was originally known as Buxodunum, meaning "land of the buxus." It is home to Le Militarial, a museum-memorial for peace established in 1996 an old fort dating from the 11th century.

== Demography ==
Historical population
Year	Pop.	±% p.a.
1968	633	—
1975	572	−1.44%
1982	509	−1.65%
1990	398	−3.03%
1999	390	−0.23%
2007	384	−0.19%
2012	403	+0.97%
2017	397	−0.30%
2023	398	+0.04%
Source: INSEE

== Personalities ==
- Pierre Bernard, football player

== See also ==
- Communes of the Tarn department
