= Mazamet =

- Commune
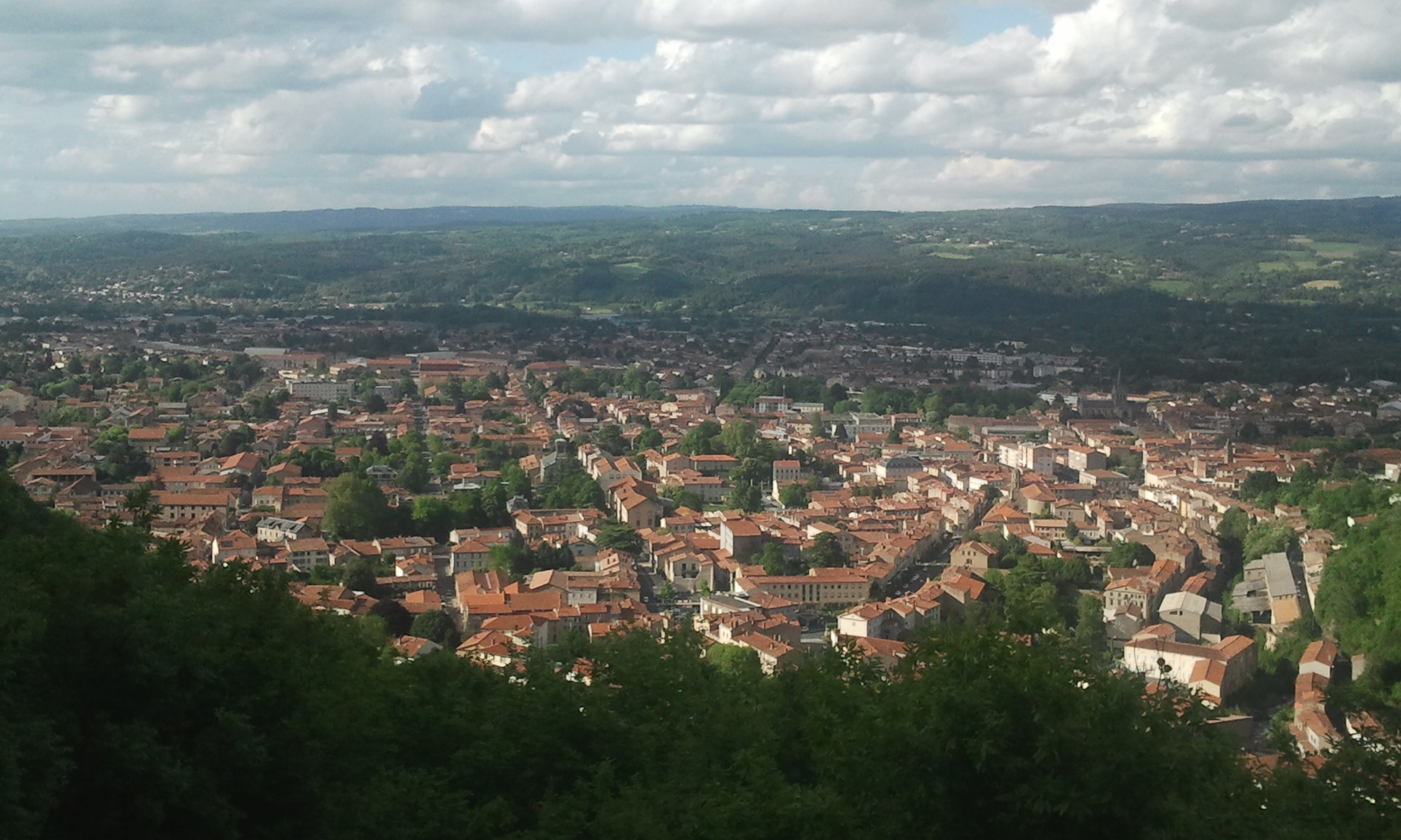
- Panorama of Mazamet

- Coat of arms
- Location of Mazamet
- Location within France Location within Occitanie
- Coordinates: 43°29′34″N 2°22′27″E
- Country: France
- Region: Occitania
- Department: Tarn
- Arrondissement: Castres
- Canton: Mazamet-1 and Mazamet-2 Vallée du Thoré
- Intercommunality: CA Castres Mazamet

Government
  - Mayor (2020–2026): Olivier Fabre
- Area^{1}: 72.08 km^{2} (27.83 sq mi)
- Elevation: 241 m (791 ft)
- Highest elevation: 1,176 m (3,858 ft)
- Lowest elevation: 213 m (699 ft)
- Population (2023): 10,085
  - Density: 139.9/km^{2} (362.4/sq mi)
- Time zone: UTC+01:00 (CET)
  - Summer (DST): UTC+02:00 (CEST)
- INSEE/Postal code: 81163 /81200
- ^{1} French Land Register data, which excludes lakes, ponds, glaciers > 1 km^{2} (0.386 sq mi or 247 acres) and river estuaries.

Mazamet is a commune in the Tarn department of Occitanie, southern France, at the northern foot of the Montagne Noire. The town developed below the medieval stronghold of Hautpoul, overlooking the valley of the Arnette.

A centre of woollen manufacture, Mazamet became internationally prominent in the nineteenth century through délainage, the separation of wool from sheepskins. Its factories processed skins imported from several continents, and the wealth of the wool trade financed substantial houses and commercial buildings.

Mazamet is also associated with the Sirven affair, in which Voltaire campaigned to overturn the conviction of a Protestant family, and with Mazamet, ville morte, a televised road-safety demonstration staged by its inhabitants in 1973.

== Geography and natural environment ==
Mazamet lies where the Arnette descends from the Montagne Noire towards the Thoré. The river runs through the town before joining the Thoré at its north-eastern boundary. The steep valley above the town became a corridor of industrial development, with factories taking advantage of the river's water.

The surrounding Haut-Languedoc landscape lies at the meeting of Atlantic, Mediterranean and mountain climatic influences. Across the regional natural park, these differences sustain contrasting habitats: beech woods and conifer forests on higher ground, oak and chestnut woodland on valley slopes, and evergreen oak woodland in Mediterranean sectors. Streams, rocky slopes, clearings and mature trees contribute to the park's biodiversity.

== History ==
=== Hautpoul and the medieval town ===
Mazamet's early history is linked to Hautpoul, a fortified settlement on a rocky ridge above the Arnette valley. During the Albigensian Crusade, Simon de Montfort besieged Hautpoul in 1212. The siege and subsequent movement of inhabitants towards the valley form part of the history of Mazamet's development.

A thirteenth-century charter issued by Jourdain de Saissac, lord of Hautpoul, granted privileges to the inhabitants of Hautpoul and the settlement beside the Arnette. The name Mas Arnette has been proposed as the origin of Mazamet, although alternative explanations exist. The name Mazamet is documented in the fifteenth century; by 1462, the settlement had fortifications and an enclosing wall.

=== Reformation and religious conflict ===
Mazamet became a Protestant stronghold during the French Wars of Religion. Its position in the Montagne Noire made it a resource base for Protestant forces. A period of respite under Henry IV was followed by renewed warfare under Louis XIII, when the forces of the Prince of Condé devastated the town. Religious divisions continued to shape its social and political history long after the fighting.

=== The Sirven affair and Voltaire ===
In the eighteenth century, a prosecution near Mazamet became one of Voltaire's campaigns against religious intolerance. The Protestant surveyor Pierre-Paul Sirven lived at Saint-Alby with his wife and three daughters. His daughter Élisabeth, who experienced serious mental-health difficulties, was placed in a Catholic convent in 1760 before being returned to her family. In January 1762, her body was discovered in a well.

The family was accused of killing her. Sirven and his wife were sentenced to death in their absence, their property was confiscated, and their effigies were publicly burned in Mazamet in 1764. They fled to Switzerland and sought Voltaire's assistance.

Voltaire publicised their case and helped mobilise support across Europe. Sirven returned to France and surrendered to the authorities in Mazamet in August 1769. In November 1771, the criminal chamber at Toulouse overturned the earlier sentence and restored his property. The affair brought a local prosecution into the wider Enlightenment debate over religious persecution and justice.

=== Wool, sheepskins and international trade ===
In 1851, industrialist Pierre-Élie Houlès imported raw sheepskins from Argentina and experimented with recovering their wool. The resulting process, known as délainage, allowed both wool and leather to be used rather than sacrificing one to obtain the other.

The soft, low-lime water of the Arnette was particularly suited to the process, which used fermentation to loosen the wool. From the 1870s, Mazamet firms established purchasing offices in producing countries, selling the recovered wool to textile manufacturers and the stripped skins to leather processors. The textile crisis of the 1880s encouraged factories to convert to the more profitable activity.

Supply networks reached Argentina, Australia, New Zealand, South Africa and North Africa; buyers included European, American and Russian markets. In the record year of 1912, more than 32 million sheepskins were processed at Mazamet. The industry linked the town's narrow river valley to livestock production and manufacturing across the world.

Industrial wealth was accompanied by arduous, poorly paid work. Some labourers combined factory employment with farming, and employers later recruited workers from abroad. Competition and changes in demand eventually undermined the industry, whose decline accelerated in the later twentieth century.

=== Labour politics and the strike of 1909 ===
Mazamet's industrial society had an unusual political pattern. As historian Maurice Agulhon observed in his review of Rémy Cazals's study of the town, its largely Catholic working class could be more conservative than its predominantly Protestant employers. Many workers supported opponents of the Republic, yet also took part in determined trade-union action.

In 1909, workers in the sheepskin-processing industry conducted a four-month strike. Troops were deployed in the area, while the strikers received support from the CGT, including Victor Griffuelhes, and from Jean Jaurès. The dispute ended in a workers' victory. Cazals reconstructed it from union and company archives, police reports, newspapers and oral testimony.

=== Resistance and liberation ===
During the Second World War, Resistance groups in the Montagne Noire and the Sidobre took part in operations around Mazamet. On 22 August 1944, a German column approaching from Carcassonne encountered Resistance fighters in the town.

According to the account of former members of the Corps franc du Sidobre reported by La Dépêche du Midi, the Resistance moved an old tank through the streets to give the impression of greater strength. After exchanges of fire and negotiations, 385 German officers and soldiers surrendered at the Stade de la Chevalière. They were subsequently held in the town's wool-conditioning premises.

=== Mazamet, ville morte ===
On 17 May 1973, Mazamet became the setting for a national road-safety campaign. Its population of about 16,600 was comparable to the number of people killed on French roads in the preceding year. Residents were asked to lie down outside their homes and workplaces, turning the streets into a representation of an entire town killed in road accidents.

Conceived by journalist Michel Tauriac and filmed by director Guy Seligmann, the operation lasted about ten minutes. The resulting television programme, Mazamet, la ville rayée de la carte, used the town to make the scale of road deaths visible. The campaign took place in the same year that France introduced major measures on seat belts, motorcycle helmets and speed limits.

== Economy and commercial renewal ==
Following the decline of the wool-processing industry, Mazamet's economy diversified into food production, pharmaceutical activities, dental supplies, metal construction and services. Businesses identified by the municipality include Menguy's, Laboratoires Pierre Fabre, SOFIC and Cabrol Construction Métallique.

Commercial activity expanded during the 2010s and early 2020s. In October 2025, La Dépêche du Midi reported that the town had recorded 183 shop openings and 86 closures since 2014. In September 2024, then-mayor Olivier Fabre stated that almost all commercial units in the central shopping area were occupied, as the municipality extended its scheme supporting the establishment or takeover of local shops.

INSEE recorded 148 business creations in the commune in 2025, compared with 82 in 2015, in the non-agricultural market economy. Of the 2025 creations, 76.4 per cent were individual enterprises. These figures measure new registrations rather than net increases in the number of businesses. The census recorded 4,608 jobs located in the commune in 2023, compared with 4,774 in 2017.

Industrial investment has continued alongside this commercial renewal. Menguy's, established in Mazamet since 1987, announced a second production facility in 2025. The municipality described the project as retaining 170 existing jobs and adding 40 positions by completion, including ten already created during the project's development. The proposed plant includes production lines for peanut butter.

The municipality introduced a first-year rent-support scheme for new or transferred town-centre shops in 2018. The assistance was calculated at €5 per square metre per month, capped at €250 monthly, or €3,000 annually. It complemented support for shopfront improvements and security equipment, with the aim of encouraging activities such as food retail, clothing, culture and hospitality. A contemporary report described municipal assistance with the first year's rent for Kedubo, an artisans' shop that reopened premises previously vacant for five years.

== Architecture and heritage ==
Mazamet's industrial prosperity survives in its factories, warehouses, religious buildings and private houses. The regional heritage survey documents how industrial families commissioned architects to design not only villas but also workplaces, offices and tombs. These commissions made architecture a visible expression of the wool trade's wealth.

The Villa Stanton at 42 rue de Strasbourg illustrates the continuity of one industrial family's architectural patronage. Its plans were drawn in 1928 by Léon Daures, with André Bazin supervising construction locally. Built for Geneviève Vidal and Robert Stanton, it closely followed the model of her grandfather Édouard Vidal's house at 3 rue du Pasteur Dardier, dating from the 1860s. Three houses associated with successive generations stand along the boulevard de Lattre de Tassigny. The inventory records dining-room wallpaper commissioned from Zuber.

Other commissions include the Villa Ermo, designed in 1901 by Jules Imbert for wool broker Ernest Molinié. Imbert and his son-in-law Charles Veaute worked on industrial buildings as well as homes; Veaute later continued the practice and helped design the Cité du Centenaire in 1951, commemorating a century of délainage.

The Grand Balcon was rebuilt and enlarged from 1905 by Toulouse architect Joseph Galinier for Gaston Cormouls-Houlès, replacing an earlier building designed by Jean-Jacques Esquié. Its later use as a hotel reflected the commercial importance of the town.

The neoclassical Temple Neuf, also called the Temple de la Sagne, was designed by Alexandre Laffon. The national heritage record notes that Catholic and Protestant congregations undertook new building projects at the same period in the nineteenth century. The temple was listed as a historic monument in 2015.

== Museums and landscape heritage ==
The Maison des Mémoires, housed in the nineteenth-century Maison Fuzier, contains furnished rooms evoking the domestic life of prosperous local families, an exhibition on délainage, and the Musée du Catharisme, which opened in 2005. The building also houses the municipal archives.

The medieval settlement of Hautpoul is connected to the hills above Mazamet by a suspension footbridge spanning the Arnette gorge. Opened in September 2018, the bridge is 140 metres long and stands about 70 metres above the gorge.

The Lac des Montagnès lies higher in the Montagne Noire, at an altitude of 680 metres, and forms another centre for outdoor recreation around the town.

== Cuisine and local festivals ==
Mazamet's culinary traditions include melsat, a charcuterie made with pork, bread and eggs, seasoned and cooked in a casing. Associated with the Montagne Noire and southern Tarn, it reflects the rural practice of making use of the different products of pig slaughter. It can be served cold or sliced and browned in a pan. Contemporary preparations also include melsat burgers.

The town celebrates the product with a Fête du Melsat, bringing local charcutiers together for tastings and public festivities.

Mazamoules is a recurring communal meal and musical evening organised by the local festival committee, Mazafolie's, under the town's covered market hall. Centred on moules-frites, it combines a shared meal with live music and dancing.

== See also ==
- Communes of the Tarn department
- Montagne Noire
- Pierre-Paul Sirven
