= Politics of Corsica =

Politics of the French territorial collectivity of Corsica

The politics in Corsica is that of a territorial collectivity with a specific organization and competences. This politics results from an institutional evolution since the in Corsica, linked to the existence of significant nationalist movements, autonomist or independence-oriented.

== Institutional history ==
=== Before 1982 ===
Annexed to France in 1768, Corsica was integrated into the French administrative organization during the Revolution by a decree of 30. The department of Corsica was created on 4 March 1790. From 1796 to 1811, Corsica was divided into two departments (Liamone and Golo).

In 1960, with the creation of regional action constituencies, Corsica was part of the Provence-Côte d'Azur-Corsica region. A decree of 9 made Corsica a region, and then, on 1, the island was again divided into two departments: Haute-Corse and Corse-du-Sud.

Corsica divided into departments and arrondissements.

With the exception of the competences exercised by the territorial collectivity of Corsica and specific tax adaptations, these departments are similar to other metropolitan departments.

Each is equipped with a general council elected by universal direct suffrage every six years. Each general council elects its president, who is the executive body of the department.

=== 1982 Status ===
Following the decentralization laws, two laws establishing a "special status" for the Corsica region were adopted in 1982. In a decision, the Constitutional Council validated the principle of the existence of a collectivity with a unique status.

Unlike other French regions, Corsica is equipped with the Corsican Assembly (and not a regional council) elected from 8 (the first regional elections were held in 1986 in other regions) by universal direct suffrage and by party-list proportional representation. The executive is entrusted to the president of the Assembly of Corsica.

The Corsica region then exercises the competences of a French region but also has responsibilities in the areas of cultural affairs and local development, planning, it operates the railway network, and enters into agreements with the State on air and maritime transport. The Assembly of Corsica can also formulate opinions and recommendations to the Prime Minister on the island's public services.

However, the full proportional system and the fact that 2,231 votes are sufficient for a list to obtain a seat make the Assembly difficult to govern. It was thus dissolved by the Council of Ministers in 1984 before a law of 10 modified its voting system to align with that of the regional councils.

=== Joxe Status (1991) ===
In 1988, the Assembly of Corsica adopted a resolution affirming the existence of the Corsican people. This issue sparked new discussions about the island's status.

In 1991, the Minister of the Interior Pierre Joxe had a new status for Corsica adopted. Drawing inspiration from the regime in place in French Polynesia, the new law created a "territorial collectivity of Corsica", with a special status, in place of the region:

- the Assembly of Corsica is composed of 51 members (instead of 61), and the party-list proportional representation is maintained, but a majority bonus of three seats is granted to the list that comes first;
- the executive is entrusted to an executive council, a collegial body distinct from the president of the Assembly, which can be overthrown by a motion of no confidence from the Assembly of Corsica;
- the territorial collectivity of Corsica receives new competences (education, audiovisual, culture, environment).

The first article of the adopted law states:

The French Republic guarantees to the living historical and cultural community that constitutes the Corsican people, a component of the French people, the rights to the preservation of its cultural identity and the defense of its specific economic and social interests. These rights, linked to insularity, are exercised in respect of national unity, within the framework of the Constitution, the laws of the Republic, and this status.

However, the Constitutional Council censured this article, considering it "contrary to the Constitution, which recognizes only the French people, composed of all French citizens without distinction of origin, race, or religion".

During the elections that followed, nationalist lists obtained 25% of the votes.

=== Matignon Process ===
In the years following the adoption of the Joxe status, several laws granted the island a specific tax status.

The nationalist movement organized violence, including between rival nationalist factions. In 1998, the prefect Claude Érignac was assassinated in the street in Ajaccio. His successor, Bernard Bonnet, launched a "clean hands" operation. The following year, he was implicated in the paillotes affair as attacks multiplied.

The denunciation of violence by the nationalist parties represented in the Assembly of Corsica and the formation of a platform, Unita, to dialogue with the government enabled the opening of new discussions: the Matignon process.

A new law was finally adopted in 2002. It strengthened the competences of the collectivity.

=== Collectivization ===
In 2003, the Constitution was amended to allow the organization of a local referendum on the evolution of territorial institutions. That same year, the Parliament adopted a law providing for such a consultation aimed at creating a single territorial collectivity replacing the current territorial collectivity and the two departments. This law was supported by the nationalist movements, but on 6, 51% of voters rejected the proposal.

The law #2003-486 “organizing a consultation of Corsican voters on the modification of the institutional organization of Corsica” was promulgated. The proposed reform notably provided for the replacement of the territorial collectivity of Corsica and the two departments (Haute-Corse and Corse-du-Sud) with a single collectivity and the creation of two territorial councils, one in Haute-Corse and the other in Corse-du-Sud. It received the support of the nationalist movements.

The single collectivity project was relaunched in 2015 through discussions between Corsican elected officials and the government. The Law on the new territorial organization of the Republic (NOTRe law) of 7 provided for the creation of a "collectivity of Corsica" on 1 in place of the current territorial collectivity and the two departments.

During the 2017 presidential election, Emmanuel Macron achieved one of his lowest scores (18.48% of the votes in the first round and 51.48% in the second), suffering from the support of the Giacobbi radical left family, which led Haute-Corse until the last municipal elections and the judicial conviction of Paul Giacobbi earlier that year. In contrast, the autonomists led by Gilles Simeoni and the independentists led by Jean-Guy Talamoni benefited from the “degagist” wave and won three of the four legislative constituencies in the election held that same year

=== Increasing autonomy ===
On 30, the Council of Ministers adopted the draft constitutional law on the autonomy status of Corsica within the French Republic. To be adopted, this constitutional reform must be voted on by the National Assembly, then the Senate, and then during their joint meeting in Congress.

== Political and administrative representation ==
=== Prefects and arrondissements ===
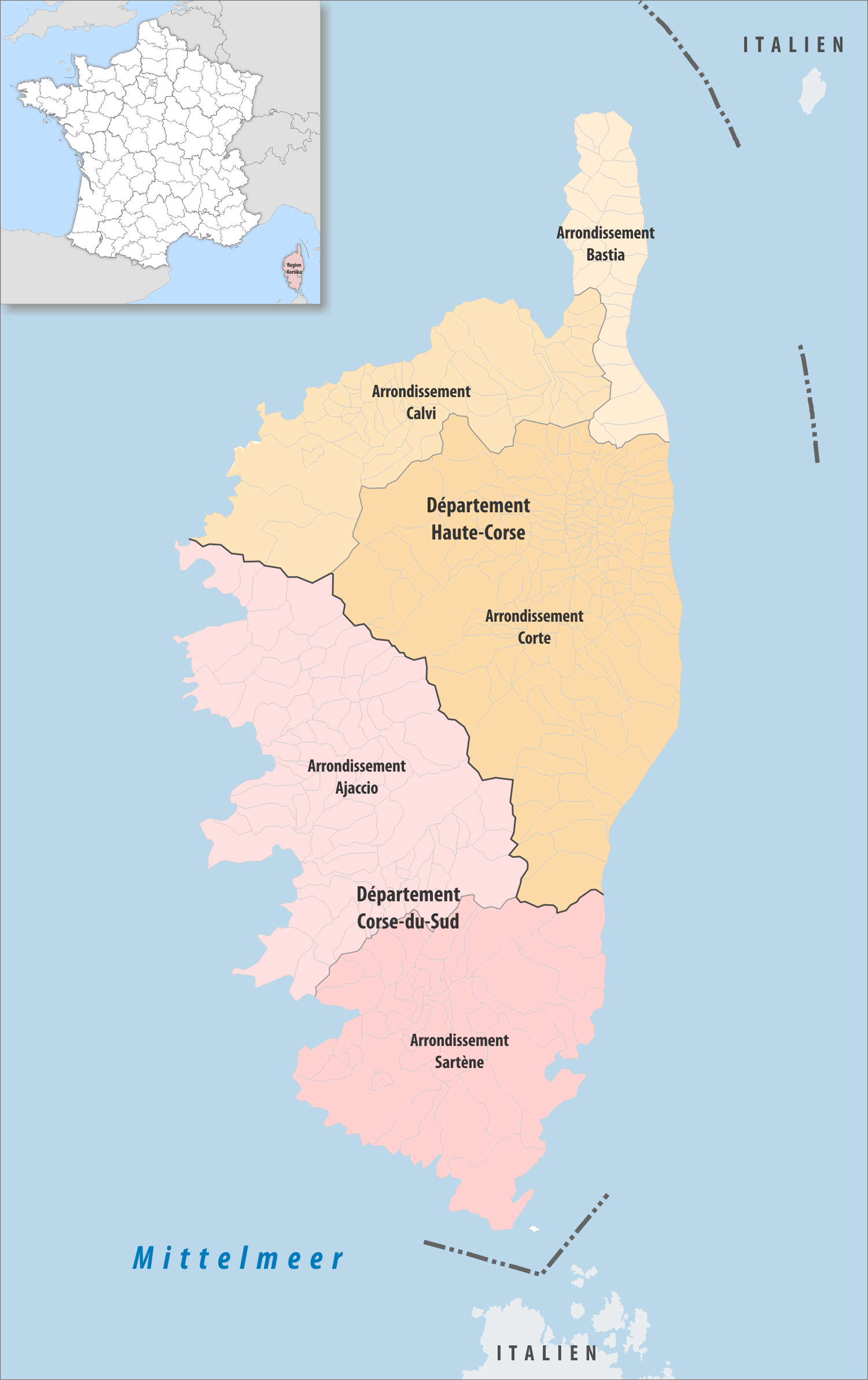
Arrondissements of Corsica with departments in color

Corsica is divided into two departments: the prefecture of Haute-Corse is located in Bastia and that of Corse-du-Sud in Ajaccio. The departments also have three sub-prefectures in Calvi, Corte, and Sartène. Until 1811, an additional sub-prefecture was located in Vico.

=== Deputies and legislative constituencies ===
Constituencies and affiliations following the 2024 elections.

List of districts in the department of Corse-du-Sud as of January 1, 2025
Name	Insee Code	Area (km^{2})	Population	Density (hab./km^{2})
Arrondissement of Ajaccio	2A1	2 224,40	123 120 (2022)	55
Arrondissement of Sartène	2A4	1 789,90	42 925 (2022)	24
Corse-du-Sud	2A	4 014,20	166 045 (2022)	41

List of districts in the department of Haute-Corse as of January 1, 2025
Name	Insee Code	Area (km^{2})	Population	Density (hab./km^{2})
Arrondissement of Bastia	2B2	473,80	92 842 (2022)	196
Arrondissement of Calvi	2B5	1 338,40	31 403 (2022)	23
Arrondissement of Corte	2B3	2 853,40	60 986 (2022)	21
Haute-Corse	2B	4 665,60	185 231 (2022)	40

=== Deputies and legislative circunscriptions ===
Members of the 17th legislature (July 18, 2024 – present)
Constituency	Name	Party	Group	Substitute
1st 2A	Laurent Marcangeli (2024-2025)	HOR-CCB	Horizons group	Xavier Lacombe
1st 2A	Xavier Lacombe	LR	Horizons group	—
2nd 2A	Paul-André Colombani	PNC	Liberties, Independents, Overseas and Territories	Thérèse Malu-Pellegrinetti
1st 2B	Michel Castellani	FaC	Liberties, Independents, Overseas and Territories	Juliette Ponzevera
2nd 2B	François-Xavier Ceccoli	LR	Republican Right group	Hélène Astolfi

=== Senators ===
Name	Party	Group	Other mandates (past or current)
Jean-Jacques Panunzi	LR	Senate Republicans	
Paul-Toussaint Parigi	FaC	Ecologist group	

== Collectivity of Corsica ==
The Law on the new territorial organization of the Republic created a single territorial collectivity on 1 in place of the territorial collectivity of Corsica and the two departments. The central administrative levels have nevertheless been preserved: Corsica thus retains two departmental prefectures and the associated State services at the deconcentrated level, but sees the two departments at the decentralized level merge. A similar project had been rejected during the 2003 referendum.

Equipped with the same bodies as the former territorial collectivity of Corsica, the Collectivity of Corsica additionally exercises the competences devolved to the departmental councils, which are thus abolished. The Assembly of Corsica is composed of 63 members, and the majority bonus granted to the list that comes first in the election is increased from 9 to 11 seats.

=== Bodies ===
Corsica forms a French territorial collectivity similar to a region but with a special status.

Its deliberative body is the Assembly of Corsica, elected by universal direct suffrage every six years, concurrently with the regional elections, via a two-round proportional list system.

The Assembly elects its president, but, unlike the regions, the latter is not responsible for executive power. This belongs to the executive council, composed of a president and ten members, elected by the Assembly. The executive council can be overthrown by a motion of no confidence from the Assembly of Corsica.

There is also an Economic, Social and Cultural Council of Corsica, which is consultative.

=== Competences ===
The Collectivity of Corsica has specific competences, set by the General Code of Local Authorities:

- education (forecasting plan for training; construction and maintenance of colleges, high schools, public vocational, artistic, special education institutions, maritime vocational high schools, agricultural education institutions, and information and guidance centers, and certain higher education institutions);
- culture and communication (cultural policy, development of the Corsican language and culture);
- sport and popular education (promotion of physical and sports activities, popular education, and youth information);
- sustainable development and planning;
- transport (operation of rail transport, territorial continuity with the mainland, national roads, agreements with departments for the organization of interdepartmental connections);
- infrastructure management (commercial and fishing seaports, airfields, rail network);
- housing and land;
- economic development (business support, tourism, agriculture and forests, vocational training, apprenticeship, and youth professional integration);
- environment (environmental protection, water resources, waste management plan, program for the exploration, exploitation, and valorization of local energy resources).

The collectivity has seven public establishments responsible for implementing its policy:

- Corsican Economic Development Agency (ADEC);
- Corsican Environment Office (OEC);
- Corsican Transport Office (OTC);
- Corsican Tourism Agency (ATC);
- Corsican Agricultural and Rural Development Office (ODARC);
- Corsican Hydraulic Equipment Office (OEHC);
- Corsican Agency for Sustainable Development, Planning, and Urbanism (AAUC).

=== Communes and intermunicipalities ===
Map of the 360 communes of Corsica as of 1.

Corsica has 360 communes (236 in Haute-Corse and 124 in Corse-du-Sud) grouped into 19 intermunicipalities (12 in Haute-Corse and 7 in Corse-du-Sud).

Mayors of municipalities with more than 10,000 inhabitants
Municipality	Mayor	Party	Election	Population
Ajaccio	Stéphane Sbraggia	HOR	2022	70 659
Bastia	Pierre Savelli	FaC	2016	45 715
Porto-Vecchio	Jean-Christophe Angelini	PNC	2020	12 042

== Political parties ==
- Pè a Corsica: political coalition founded in 2015 that includes:
  - Femu a Corsica
  - Corsica libera
- A Manca ("The Left"): regional far-left party, founded in 2009 and derived from A Manca naziunale ("The National Left") created in 1998.
- Bonapartist Central Committee: right-wing party present only in Ajaccio, founded in 1908.
- Corse social-démocrate (CSD): regional left-wing party, founded in 1996.
- Corsica Libera ("Free Corsica"): far-left independence party, founded in 2009.
- Europe Écologie I Verdi: regional environmentalist party, founded in 1988. Corsican federation of Europe Écologie Les Verts (EELV).
- Rinnovu: independence party that was part of Corsica libera from its founding in 2009 until 2012.
- Corsica Viva

== See also ==
- Executive Council of Corsica
- Departmental Council of Corse-du-Sud
- Departmental Council of Haute-Corse
