= President of the Regional Council (France) =

Political party of the presidents of the regional councils after the 2021 election: Socialist Party (PS) Miscellaneous left (DVG) The Republicans (LR) The Centrists (LC) Miscellaneous right (DVD) Regionalist parties (REG)

The following is a list of current presidents of the regional councils of France.

All regions in metropolitan France are governed by a regional council, with their respective presidents elected by and among their members to lead the executive; the Corsican Assembly is the sole exception, as it controls the Executive Council. In overseas France, the local institutions vary across the five regions.

== List ==
Since 2011, the Departmental Council of Mayotte has simultaneously exercised the competencies of a regional council.

Since 2015, the Regional Council of Martinique and the Regional Council of French Guiana have been merged with their respective departmental councils to form a single territorial structure of governance.

=== List ===
Region	Map	President	Party	Party positioning	Since
Auvergne-Rhône-Alpes		Fabrice Pannekoucke	LR	Right	5 September 2024
Bourgogne-Franche-Comté		Jérôme Durain	PS	Left	5 September 2025
Brittany		Loïg Chesnais-Girard	DVG	Left	22 June 2017
Centre-Val de Loire		François Bonneau	PS	Left	7 September 2007
Corsica		Marie-Antoinette Maupertuis; President of the Corsican Assembly	FaC	Regionalist centre	1 July 2021
Corsica		Gilles Simeoni; President of the Executive Council of Corsica	FaC	Regionalist centre	17 December 2015
Grand Est		Franck Leroy	DVD	Right	30 December 2022
Guadeloupe		Ary Chalus	GUSR	Regionalist centre	18 December 2015
French Guiana		Gabriel Serville; President of the Assembly of French Guiana	Péyi G	Regionalist left	2 July 2021
Hauts-de-France		Xavier Bertrand	LR	Right	4 January 2016
Île-de-France		Valérie Pécresse	LR	Right	18 December 2015
Martinique		Lucien Saliber; President of the Assembly of Martinique	DVG	Left	2 July 2021
Martinique		Serge Letchimy; President of the Executive Council of Martinique	PPM	Regionalist left	2 July 2021
Mayotte		Ben Issa Ousséni; President of the Departmental Council of Mayotte	LR	Right	1 July 2021
Normandy		Hervé Morin	LC	Right	4 January 2016
Nouvelle-Aquitaine		Alain Rousset	PS	Left	4 January 2016; President of the Regional Council of Aquitaine from 20 March 1998 until 31 December 2015.
Occitania		Carole Delga	PS	Left	4 January 2016
Pays de la Loire		Christelle Morançais	HOR	Right	19 October 2017
Provence-Alpes-Côte d’Azur		Renaud Muselier	RE	Centre	15 May 2017
Réunion		Huguette Bello	PLR	Regionalist left	2 July 2021

=== Summary ===
==== By party ====
Party		Number of presidents
Left	PLR	1
Left	PS	5
Left	DVG	1
Left	Total left	7
Right	LC	1
Right	DVD	1
Right	LR	6
Right	Total right	8
Regionalist	Péyi G	1
Regionalist	PPM	1
Regionalist	GUSR	1
Regionalist	FaC	2
Regionalist	Total regionalists	5

==== By sex ====
Sex	Number of presidents
Male	14
Female	6

== Historic presidents ==
=== Current regions ===
==== Regional Council of Auvergne-Rhône-Alpes ====
Party	President	In office
LR	Laurent Wauquiez	Since 2016

==== Regional Council of Brittany ====
Party	President	In office
CD	René Pleven	1974–1976
CD, UDF	André Colin	1976–1978
UDF	Raymond Marcellin	1978–1986
RPR	Yvon Bourges	1986–1998
UMP	Josselin de Rohan	1998–2004
PS	Jean-Yves Le Drian	2004–2012
PS	Pierrick Massiot	2012–2015
PS	Jean-Yves Le Drian	2015–2017
PS	Loïg Chesnais-Girard	Since 2017

==== Regional Council of Bourgogne-Franche-Comté ====
Party	President	In office
PS	Marie-Guite Dufay	Since 2016

==== Regional Council of Centre-Val de Loire ====
Party	President	In office
RI	Raymond Boisdé	1974–1976
UDF	Pierre Sudreau	1976–1979
UDF	Jean Delaneau	1979–1983
UDF	Daniel Bernardet	1983–1985
UDF	Maurice Dousset	1985–1998
UDF	Bernard Harang	1998
RPR	Lydie Gerbaud	1998
PS	Michel Sapin	1998–2000
PS	Jean Germain	2000
PS	Alain Rafesthain	2000–2004
PS	Michel Sapin	2004–2007
PS	Jean Germain	2007
PS	François Bonneau	Since 2007

==== Regional Council of Grand Est ====
Party	President	In office
LR	Philippe Richert	2016–2017
UDI	Jean-Luc Bohl	2017
LR	Jean Rottner	Since 2017

==== Regional Council of Guadeloupe ====
Party	President	In office
FGPS	Pierre Mathieu	1975–1980
FGPS	Robert Pentier	1980–1981
UDF	Marcel Esdras	1981–1982
PCG	Marcel Gargar	1982–1983
RPR	José Moustache	1983–1986
FGPS	Félix Proto	1986–1992
RPR, UMP	Lucette Michaux-Chevry	1992–2004
FGPS	Victorin Lurel	2004–2012
FGPS	Josette Borel-Lincertin	2012–2014
FGPS	Victorin Lurel	2014–2015
GUSR	Ary Chalus	Since 2015

==== Regional Council of Hauts-de-France ====
Party	President	In office
LR	Xavier Bertrand	Since 2016

==== Regional Council of Île-de-France ====
Party	President	In office
RPR	Michel Giraud	1976–1988
RPR	Pierre-Charles Krieg	1988–1992
RPR	Michel Giraud	1992–1998
PS	Jean-Paul Huchon	1998–2015
LR-SL	Valérie Pécresse	Since 2015

==== Regional Council of Normandy ====
Party	President	In office
LC	Hervé Morin	Since 2016

==== Regional Council of Nouvelle-Aquitaine ====
Party	President	In office
PS	Alain Rousset	Since 2016

==== Regional Council of Occitania ====
Party	President	In office
PS	Carole Delga	Since 2016

==== Regional Council of Pays de la Loire ====
Party	President	In office
RPR	Vincent Ansquer	1974
RPR	Olivier Guichard	1974–1998
RPR	François Fillon	1998–2002
UMP	Jean-Luc Harousseau	2002–2004
PS	Jacques Auxiette	2004–2015
LR	Bruno Retailleau	2015–2017
LR	Christelle Morançais	Since 2017

==== Regional Council of Provence-Alpes-Côte d'Azur ====
Party	President	In office
PS	Gaston Defferre	1974–1981
PS	Michel Pezet	1981–1986
UDF	Jean-Claude Gaudin	1986–1998
PS	Michel Vauzelle	1998–2015
LR	Christian Estrosi	2015–2017
LR, DVD	Renaud Muselier	Since 2017

==== Regional Council of Réunion ====
Party	President	In office
UDF	Marcel Cerneau	1973–1978
RPR	Yves Barau	1978–1983
PCR	Mario Hoarau	1983–1986
UDF	Pierre Lagourgue	1986–1992
Free Dom	Camille Sudre	1992–1993
Free Dom	Margie Sudre	1993–1998
PCR	Paul Vergès	1998–2010
UMP, LR, OR	Didier Robert	2010–2021
PLR	Huguette Bello	Since 2021

=== Collectivities ===
==== Corsica ====
===== Regional Council of Corsica (1974–1982) =====
Party	President	In office
Radical	François Giacobbi	1974–1979
Radical	Jean Filippi	1979–1982

===== Corsican Assembly (since 1982) =====
Party	President	In office
MRG	Prosper Alfonsi	1982–1984
RPR	Jean-Paul de Rocca Serra	1984–1998
UDF	José Rossi	1998–2004
UMP	Camille de Rocca Serra	2004–2010
PCF	Dominique Bucchini	2010–2015
CL	Jean-Guy Talamoni	2015–2021
FaC	Marie-Antoinette Maupertuis	Since 2021

===== Executive Council of Corsica (since 1992) =====
Party	President	In office
DVD	Jean Baggioni	1992–2004
UMP	Ange Santini	2004–2010
DVG	Paul Giacobbi	2010–2015
FaC	Gilles Simeoni	Since 2015

==== French Guiana ====
===== Regional Council of French Guiana (1974–2015) =====
Party	President	In office
UDF	Serge Patient	1974–1980
PSG	Jacques Lony	1980–1982
PS	Georges Othily	1982–1992
PSG	Antoine Karam	1992–2010
DVG	Rodolphe Alexandre	2010–2015

===== Assembly of French Guiana (since 2015) =====
Party	President	In office
DVG	Rodolphe Alexandre	Since 2015

==== Martinique ====
===== Regional Council of Martinique (1974–2015) =====
Party	President	In office
RPR	Camille Petit	1974–1983
PPM	Aimé Césaire	1983–1986
PPM	Camille Darsières	1986–1992
PCM	Émile Capgras	1992–1998
MIM	Alfred Marie-Jeanne	1998–2010
PPM	Serge Letchimy	2010–2015

===== Assembly of Martinique (since 2015) =====
Party	President	In office
RDM	Claude Lise	2015–2021
DVG	Lucien Saliber	Since 2021

===== Executive Council of Martinique (since 2015) =====
Party	President	In office
MIM	Alfred Marie-Jeanne	2015–2021
PPM	Serge Letchimy	Since 2021

==== Mayotte ====
===== Departmental Council of Mayotte =====
Party	President	In office
UDF	Younoussa Bamana	1977–1991
DIV	Hamissi Assani	1991
UDF	Younoussa Bamana	1991–2004
NÉMA	Saïd Omar Oili	2004–2008
UMP	Ahmed Attoumani Douchina	2008–2011
MDM	Daniel Zaïdani	2011–2015
UMP, LR	Soibahadine Ibrahim Ramadani	2015–2021
LR	Ben Issa Ousséni	Since 2021

=== Former regions ===
==== Regional Council of Alsace ====
Party	President	In office
UDR	André Bord	1973–1977
UDF	Pierre Schielé	1977–1980
UDF	Marcel Rudloff	1980–1996
UMP	Adrien Zeller	1996–2009
UMP	André Reichardt	2009–2010
UMP	Philippe Richert	2010–2015

==== Regional Council of Auvergne ====
Party	President	In office
UDF	Jean Morellon	1974–1977
RPR	Augustin Chauvet	1977
PS	Maurice Pourchon	1977–1986
UDF	Valéry Giscard d'Estaing	1986–2004
PS	Pierre-Joël Bonté	2004–2006
PS	René Souchon	2006–2015

==== Regional Council of Aquitaine ====
Party	President	In office
RPR	Jacques Chaban-Delmas	1974–1979
PS	André Labarrère	1979–1981
PS	Philippe Madrelle	1981–1985
RPR	Jacques Chaban-Delmas	1985–1988
UDF	Jean François-Poncet	1988
UDF	Jean Tavernier	1988–1992
RPR	Jacques Valade	1992–1998
PS	Alain Rousset	1998–2015

==== Regional Council of Burgundy ====
Party	President	In office
RI	Jean Chamant	1974–1978
UDF	Marcel Lucotte	1978–1979
PS	Pierre Joxe	1979–1982
PS	André Billardon	1982–1983
CDS	Frédéric Lescure	1983–1985
UDF	Marcel Lucotte	1985–1989
UDF	Raymond Janot	1989–1992
UDF	Jean-Pierre Soisson	1992–1993
RPR	Jean-François Bazin	1993–1998
UDF	Jean-Pierre Soisson	1998–2004
PS	François Patriat	2004–2015

==== Regional Council of Champagne-Ardenne ====
Party	President	In office
RPR	Jacques Sourdille	1974–1981
UDF	Bernard Stasi	1981–1988
RPR	Jean Kaltenbach	1988–1998
UDF	Jean-Claude Étienne	1998–2004
PS	Jean-Paul Bachy	2004–2015

==== Regional Council of Franche-Comté ====
Party	President	In office
UDR	Edgar Faure	1974–1981
PS	Jean-Pierre Chevènement	1981–1982
GD	Edgar Faure	1982–1988
RPR	Pierre Chantelat	1988–1998
UDF	Jean-François Humbert	1998–2004
PS	Raymond Forni	2004–2008
PS	Marie-Guite Dufay	2008–2015

==== Regional Council of Languedoc-Roussillon ====
Party	President	In office
PS	Francis Vals	1974
PS	Edgar Tailhades	1974–1983
PS	Robert Capdeville	1983–1986
UDF	Jacques Blanc	1986–2004
PS	Georges Frêche	2004–2010
PS	Christian Bourquin	2010–2014
PS	Damien Alary	2014–2015

==== Regional Council of Limousin ====
Party	President	In office
PS	André Chandernagor	1974–1981
PS	Louis Longequeue	1981–1986
PS	Robert Savy	1986–2004
PS	Jean-Paul Denanot	2004–2014
PS	Gérard Vandenbroucke	2014–2015

==== Regional Council of Lorraine ====
Party	President	In office
CNIP, FNRI	Jean Vilmain	1974–1976
RAD, UDF	Jean-Jacques Servan-Schreiber	1976–1978
RPR	Pierre Messmer	1978–1979
RPR	André Madoux	1979–1982
DVD	Jean-Marie Rausch	1982–1992
UDF	Gérard Longuet	1992–2004
PS	Jean-Pierre Masseret	2004–2015

==== Regional Council of Midi-Pyrénées ====
Party	President	In office
PS	Alain Savary	1973–1981
PS	Alex Raymond	1981–1986
UDF	Dominique Baudis	1986–1988
UDF	Marc Censi	1988–1998
PS	Martin Malvy	1998–2015

==== Regional Council of Nord-Pas-de-Calais ====
Party	President	In office
PS	Pierre Mauroy	1974–1981
PS	Noël Josèphe	1981–1992
Les Verts	Marie-Christine Blandin	1992–1998
PS	Michel Delebarre	1998–2001
PS	Daniel Percheron	2001–2015

==== Regional Council of Lower Normandy ====
Party	President	In office
RI	Michel d'Ornano	1974
RI	Léon Jozeau-Marigné	1974–1978
DVD	Paul German	1978–1982
UDF	Léon Jozeau-Marigné	1982–1983
UDF	Michel d'Ornano	1983–1986
UDF	René Garrec	1986–2004
PS	Philippe Duron	2004–2008
PS	Laurent Beauvais	2008–2015

==== Regional Council of Upper Normandy ====
Party	President	In office
CD	Jean Lecanuet	1974
RI	André Bettencourt	1974–1981
PS	Laurent Fabius	1981–1982
PS	Tony Larue	1982
RPR	Roger Fossé	1982–1992
RPR	Antoine Rufenacht	1992–1998
RPR	Jean-Paul Gauzès	1998
PS	Alain Le Vern	1998–2012
PS	Emmanuèle Jeandet-Mengual	2012–2013
PS	Alain Le Vern	2013
PS	Emmanuèle Jeandet-Mengual	2013
PS	Nicolas Mayer-Rossignol	2013–2015

==== Regional Council of Picardy ====
Party	President	In office
CNIP	Jean Legendre	1974–1976
UDF	Charles Baur	1976–1978
DVG	Max Lejeune	1978–1979
DVD	Jacques Mossion	1979–1980
PCF	Raymond Maillet	1980–1981
PS	René Dosière	1981–1983
PS	Walter Amsallem	1983–1985
UDF	Charles Baur	1985–2004
PS	Claude Gewerc	2004–2015

==== Regional Council of Poitou-Charentes ====
Party	President	In office
	Lucien Grand	1974–1976
CNIP	Jacques Fouchier	1976–1978
RPR	Francis Hardy	1978–1980
UDF	Fernand Chaussebourg	1980–1981
	Michel Boucher	1981–1982
PS	Jacques Santrot	1982
PS	Raoul Cartraud	1982–1985
UDF	René Monory	1985–1986
UDF	Louis Fruchard	1986–1988
UDF	Jean-Pierre Raffarin	1988–2002
	Dominique de La Martinière	2002
UMP	Élisabeth Morin-Chartier	2002–2004
PS	Ségolène Royal	2004–2014
PS	Jean-François Macaire	2014–2015

==== Regional Council of Rhône-Alpes ====
Party	President	In office
FNRI, UDF	Paul Ribeyre	1974–1980
UDF	Michel Durafour	1980–1981
UDF	Charles Béraudier	1981–1988
UDF	Charles Millon	1988–1999
UDF	Anne-Marie Comparini	1999–2004
PS	Jean-Jack Queyranne	2004–2015

== See also ==
- Politics of France
- Regions of France
- Regional council (France)
