= Gilles Giovannangeli =

Corsican politician (born 1965)

President of the Executive Council of Corsica
- Incumbent
- Assumed office 4 May 2026
- Preceded by: Gilles Simeoni

Member of the Executive Council of Corsica
- In office 1 July 2021 – 4 May 2026
- President: Gilles Simeoni

Mayor of Lecci
- In office 18 March 2001 – 30 March 2014
- Preceded by: François Marchi
- Succeeded by: Georges Gianni

Personal details
- Born: January 1965 (age 61) Lecci, Corsica, France
- Party: Femu a Corsica
- Other political affiliations: Muvimentu Corsu per l'Autodeterminazione

Military service
- Allegiance: National Liberation Front of Corsica (1976-1990)
- Battles/wars: Corsican conflict

Gilles Giovannangeli (born 1965) is a Corsican politician and former guerrilla serving as president of the Executive Council of Corsica since May 2026.

Born in Lecci, Giovannangeli was raised as a staunch Corsican nationalist. His sister, Marie-France Giovannangeli, was an important figure in the Corsican labour movement, closely intertwined with the nationalist movement, and a co-founder of the Corsican Workers’ Trade Union. Arrested at 19 for his involvement in the National Liberation Front of Corsica, Giovannangeli served 27 months in prison in France and 3 months in Ajaccio.

Giovannangeli was elected mayor of Lecci, his hometown, in 2001. He served in this position until 2014. In 2021, he was elected as a territorial councillor in the Corsican Assembly as part of Femu a Corsica. In the assembly, he served as president of Corsica's economic development commission. After Gilles Simeoni’s resignation in 2026, Giovannangeli was elected president of the Executive Council of Corsica.

== Early life and FLNC service ==
Gilles Giovannangeli was born in January 1965 in the town of Lecci. He and his sister, Marie-France Giovannangeli, were raised as Corsican nationalists. Giovannangeli was also an athlete, representing Corsica in cycling events.

Giovannangeli got involved in the National Liberation Front of Corsica shortly after its creation. After a failed bomb attack on a bank in 1984, Giovannangeli was arrested alongside other FLNC militants and incarcerated in Les Beaumettes prison before being transferred to Ajaccio prison. Corsican nationalists campaigned for his release, and he was granted the status of political prisoner by multiple human rights organizations. He was released after 30 months in prison, serving a reduced five-year sentence.

== Political career ==
Giovannangeli was elected mayor of Lecci after the 2001 municipal elections, representing a local regionalist group. He served until 2014, choosing not to run. He was replaced by Georges Gianni of The Republicans.

In 2021, Giovannangeli was included on the list of Femu a Corsica for the 2021 Corsican territorial election. after being elected, he served on the Corsican executive council as president of the water authority and then as president of the Corsican economic development committee.

=== President of the Corsican Executive Committee ===
Giovannangeli was elected president of the Corsican Executive Committee on 4 May 2026, soon after Gilles Simeoni, the previous president, resigned. He received 34 votes from Femu a Corsica and Nazione councillors. His opponent, Jean-Martin Mondolini, member of U Soffiu Novu, the right-wing opposition in the Corsican assembly, got 15 votes. Core in Fronte, left-wing separatists, chose not to participate in the elections.

Simeoni remains in his cabinet, working to secure Corsican autonomy in the face of a Corsican autonomy bill moving through the national assembly, which would grant Corsica constitutionally recognised autonomy.
