= Executive Council of Corsica =

- Established: 2 April 1992; 34 years ago
- Headquarters: Grand Hôtel d'Ajaccio; 22 Cours Grandval, Ajaccio
- Members: 11 (2018-present); 9 (1992-2018)
- President: Gilles Giovannangeli
- Affiliations: Corsican Assembly

The Executive Council of Corsica (Corsican: Cunsigliu esecutivu di Corsica; French: Conseil exécutif de Corse) is the executive body of the Corsican government, responsible for the implementation of the decisions made by the legislative Corsican Assembly and carrying out the day-to-day actions under the jurisdiction of the Collectivity of Corsica.

Composed of eleven councillors, including a president, the executive council is elected by the Corsican Assembly and is legally subservient to it. The president of the executive council is in effect the Corsican head of state, running local politics and representing Corsica in domestic meetings with French officials, like the president, and international meetings.

== History ==
The Defferre accords and the creation of the Corsican Assembly paved the way for an autonomous Corsican government, making Corsica into a "territorial collecticity with special status", a status unique to the island. Following the decentralisation laws in 1986, Corsica maintained this status, as unlike the regional councils present in metropolitan French regions, the Corsican Assembly had limited executive power. Many Corsican nationalists and autonomists, represented by the National Liberation Front of Corsica (and its political wing, the Corsican Movement for Self-Determination) and the Union of the Corsican People respectively, felt these reforms did not go far enough and campaigned for more executive powers.

In May 1988, shortly after the re-election of François Mitterrand, the FLNC called a controversial ceasefire to negotiate the status of the Corsican government. This resulted in a deadly split and subsequent conflict between rival FLNC factions. The FLNC-Canal Habituel, led by Alain Orsoni, continued the ceasefire and government negotiations, resulting in the Joxe Accords, championed by interior minister Pierre Joxe. These agreements, opposed by the Habituels' rival faction, the FLNC-Canal Historique, resulted in more legislative powers in the Corsican Assembly and the creation of the Executive Council of Corsica, responsible for all executive actions on the island of Corsica, more than the Corsican Assembly had. The law solidifying this passed in the National Assembly on 13 May 1991 and was enacted after the 1992 elections on 2 April 1992. An autonomous region with two legislative and executive bodies in France was unique to Corsica until Martinique established its own executive council in 2016.

=== First executive council: Baggioni cabinet (1992-2004) ===
The first executive council was elected by the Corsican Assembly upon its creation on 2 April 1992. Two councillors had announced their candidacies: Jean Baggioni, member of Rally for the Republic and mayor of Ville-di-Pietrabugno, and Edmond Simeoni, leader of Union of the Corsican People, the island's largest autonomist party. 24 councillors, all on the right, voted for Baggioni, while 10 autonomist and nationalist councillors, all nine members of Corsica Nazione and Alain Orsoni of the MPA, voted for Simeoni.

Baggioni appointed only six other councillors, all confirmed by a vote in the Corsican Assembly. The Baggioni cabinet carried a campaign of fiscal responsibility and combat against the various factions of the FLNC, working closely with authorities in Paris as well as the Prefect of Corsica to attempt this. Baggioni and his cabinet were re-elected in 1998 and the by-elections in 1999 after the 1998 elections were annulled.

Baggioni was president during the 2003 Corsican autonomy referendum, which would've overseen a slight reshaping of the Corsican government, but the referendum failed by a 1% margin. A similar plan was instituted in 2018.

=== Second executive council: Santini cabinet (2004-2010) ===
Following the 2004 Corsican territorial election, Ange Santini, mayor of Calvi and member of the Union for a Popular Movement, was elected president of the Executive Council in a unanimous vote by the Corsican Assembly. Santini largely followed in the footsteps of Baggioni, though carried out a slightly more conservative agenda. Notably, José Rossi was in his cabinet as one of his eight councillors and leader of the Corsican Economic Development Agency.

=== Third executive council: Giacobbi cabinet (2010-2015) ===
Following the success of the left in the 2010 Corsican territorial election, Paul Giacobbi, leader of the "Left Union" coalition in the Corsican Assembly, was elected president. His cabinet included members from the Radical Left Party (his own party), the Socialist Party, and Corsican Social Democracy, a regional party included in his Left Union. Giacobbi would leave the PRG in 2014, but continue to work with them within the Corsican Assembly.

=== Fourth executive council: first Simeoni cabinet (2015-2018) ===
In the 2015 Corsican territorial election, a nationalist-autonomist coalition, for the first time, won a majority in the Corsican Assembly. An agreement within the coalition was established: Jean-Guy Talamoni, separatist and member of Corsica Libera, would become president of the Corsican Assembly, while Gilles Simeoni, autonomist, member of Femu a Corsica and son of Edmond Simeoni, would become president of the Executive Council. Thus, on 17 December, Gilles Simeoni was elected president. His first cabinet was a mix of FaC and CL members, focusing on union between nationalists and autonomists.

Following the victory of the nationalists in Corsica, autonomy bills were debated on in the Corsican Assembly and National Assembly. This resulted in a law being passed turning Corsica into a "single territorial collectivity", giving Corsica further autonomy and abolishing the local governments in Haute-Corse and Corse-du-Sud, giving their powers to the Corsican Assembly. This law being passed resulted in new elections for the new Collectivity of Corsica.

=== Fifth executive council: second Simeoni cabinet (2018-2021) ===
Following the 2017 Corsican territorial election and the creation of the Collectivity of Corsica, Simeoni was elected unanimously in the Corsican Assembly to continue his position and become the first president of the Executive Council of the Corsican Collectivity. The new government allowed for eleven councillors in the executive rather than nine. Simeoni and Talamoni continued to push for further autonomy for the island after this victory.

=== Sixth executive council: third Simeoni cabinet (2021-2025) ===
Following the collapse of the autonomist-nationalist coalition, elections were held in Corsica for the Corsican Assembly, which Simeoni's Femu a Corsica won handily. Simeoni's new cabinet replaced the PNC and CL council members with FaC members, which now single-handedly controlled the Corsican government.

=== Seventh executive council: fourth Simeoni cabinet (2025-2026) ===
Simeoni, carrying out his promise of a cabinet reshuffling halfway through his term, reshuffled his government in January 2025, replacing three council members. The stated goal of this was to "exercise democracy". This cabinet notably included Jean-Félix Acquaviva, former member of the National Assembly recently defeated in the 2024 snap elections.

=== Eighth executive council: Giovannangeli cabinet (2026-present) ===
Following Gilles Simeoni's resignation in April 2026, Gilles Giovannangeli replaced him. Many council members remained, including Simeoni himself, who was put in charge of the ongoing autonomy reforms in Corsica.

== Functions ==
The Executive Council of Corsica is in charge of preparing and implementing decisions made by the Corsican Assembly. It is also in charge of authorising expenditures. Most councillors are also chosen to head the multiple common services on the island, including:

- the Office of the Environment
- the Office of Energy, Urban Planning, and Development
- the Office of Agriculture and Rural Development
- the Office of Transport
- the Corsican Regional Water Authority
- the Corsican Land Authority
- the Corsican Agency of Tourism
- the Corsican Agency of economic development

Each year, the president of the Executive Council presents a report to the Corsican Assembly on the situation of the collectivity.

== Relationship with the Corsican Assembly ==
Members of the Executive Council have the right to attend and speak at sessions of the Corsican Assembly, though they cannot vote.

A vote of no confidence can be tabled by at least one-third of the members of the Corsican Assembly. The motion must specify replacement candidates for all executive councillors, including the president, who would automatically assume these positions if the motion were adopted. The motion can only be adopted by an absolute majority vote in the Corsican Assembly.

== Composition ==
The Executive Council is elected from members of the Corsican Assembly, although you cannot be both an executive councillor and a member of the Corsican Assembly simultaneously. Following the election of a member to the Executive Council, their seat in the Corsican Assembly is replaced by another member of their party.

=== Current Composition (2026-present) ===
- Gilles Giovannangeli, president (FaC)
- Bianca Fazi (FaC)
- Gilles Simeoni (FaC)
- Lauda Guidicelli-Sbraggia (FaC)
- Guy Armanet (FaC)
- Angèle Bastiani (FaC)
- Julien Paolini (FaC)
- Dominique Livrelli (FaC)
- Anne-Laure Santucci (FaC)
- Jean-Félix Acquaviva (FaC)
- Vannina Chiarelli-Luzi (FaC)

=== Fourth Simeoni cabinet (2025-2026) ===
- Gilles Simeoni, president (FaC)
- Bianca Fazi (FaC)
- Guy Armanet (FaC)
- Lauda Guidicelli-Sbraggia (FaC)
- Julien Paolini (FaC)
- Angèle Bastiani (FaC)
- Jean-Félix Acquaviva (FaC)
- Vannina Chiarelli-Luzi (FaC)
- Gilles Giovannangeli (FaC)
- Anne-Laure Santucci (FaC)
- Dominique Livrelli (FaC)

=== Third Simeoni cabinet (2021-2025) ===
- Gilles Simeoni, president (FaC)
- Bianca Fazi (FaC)
- Guy Armanet (FaC)
- Lauda Guidicelli-Sbraggia (FaC)
- Julien Paolini (FaC)
- Angèle Bastiani (FaC)
- Alex Vinciguerra (FaC)
- Flora Mattei (FaC)
- Gilles Giovannangeli (FaC)
- Antonia Luciani (FaC)
- Dominique Livrelli (FaC)

=== Second Simeoni cabinet (2018-2021) ===
- Gilles Simeoni, president (FaC)
- Marie-Antoinette Maupertius (FaC)
- Jean-Christophe Angelini (PNC)
- Josepha Giacometti (CL)
- François Sargentini (CL)
- Vannina Borromei (PNC)
- Jean Biancucci (FaC)
- Bianca Fazi (FaC)
- Xavier Luciani (PNC)
- Lauda Guidicelli-Sbraggia (FaC)
- Lionel Mortini (None)

=== First Simeoni cabinet (2015-2018) ===
- Gilles Simeoni, president (FaC)
- Fabienne Giovannini (FaC)
- Agnès Simonpietri (None)
- Jean-Félix Acquaviva (FaC)
- Xavier Luciani (FaC)
- Josepha Giacometti (CL)
- Jean-Christophe Angelini (FaC)
- Marie-Antoinette Maupertius (FaC)
- François Sargentini (CL)

=== Giacobbi cabinet (2010-2015) ===
- Paul Giacobbi, president (PRG)
- Jean Zuccarelli (PRG)
- Vanina Pieri (CSD)
- Marie-Thérèse Olivesi (None)
- Paul-Marie Bartoli (PRG)
- Emmanuelle de Gentilli (PS)
- Pierre Ghionga (None)
- Maria Guidicelli (None)
- Jean-Louis Luciani (PRG)

=== Santini cabinet (2004-2010) ===
- Ange Santini, president (UMP)
- José Rossi (None)
- Stéphanie Grimaldi (UMP)
- Antoine Sindali (UMP)
- Jérôme Polverini (UMP)
- Antoine Giorgi (UMP)
- Jean-Claude Bonaccorsi (None)
- Simone Guerrini (UMP)
- Sauveur Gandolfi-Scheit (UMP)

=== Baggioni cabinet (1992-2004) ===
- Jean Baggioni, president (RPR)
- Jerome Polverini (RPR)
- Paul Patriarche (None)
- François Piazza-Alessandrini (RPR)
- Paul Giacobbi (MRG)
- Xavier Villanova (CCB)
- Alexandre Alessandrini (MRG)
