= 2017 Corsican territorial election =

Election in Corsica

- 3 December 2017 (first round); 10 December 2017 (second round)

63 seats in the Corsican Assembly 32 seats needed for a majority
- Turnout: 52.10% ▼7.56% (first round); 52.55% ▼14.48% (second round)
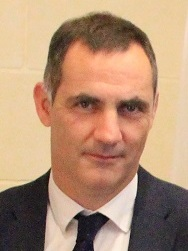

	First party	Second party	Third party
Leader	Gilles Simeoni	Jean-Martin Mondoloni	Jean-Charles Orsucci
Party	Femu a Corsica	DVD	DVG
Last election	24 seats	0 seats	0 seats
Seats before	24	0	0
Seats after	41	10	6
Seat change	▲17	▲10	▲6
1st round %	54,212; 45.36%	17,891; 14.97%	13,455; 11.26%
2nd round %	67,253; 56.46%	21,784; 18.29%	15,080; 12.66%
	Fourth party	Fifth party	Sixth party
Leader	Valérie Bozzi	Paul-Félix Benedetti	Jacques Casamarta
Party	LR	Rinnovu	PCF
Last election	11 seats	0 seats	Prima a Corsica
Seats before	11	0	3
Seats after	6	0	0
Seat change	▼5	Steady	▼3
1st round %	15,265; 12.77%	7,996; 6.69%	6,787; 5.68%
2nd round %	14,990; 12.59%	Eliminated (no alliance)	Eliminated (no alliance)
	Seventh party
Leader	Charles Giacomi
Party	FN
Last election	4 seats
Seats before	4
Seats after	0
Seat change	▼4
1st round %	3,917; 3.28%
2nd round %	Eliminated
President of the Executive Council before election
Gilles Simeoni
FC
Elected President of the Executive Council
Gilles Simeoni
FC

The 2017 Corsican territorial elections were held on 3 and 10 December 2017 to elect 63 members of the Corsican Assembly, who in turn determined the composition of the Executive Council of Corsica. The election was held only two years after the 2015 territorial elections, and were called as a result of the planned creation of a single collectivity within Corsica resulting from the mergers of two departments (Haute-Corse and Corse-du-Sud), and the existing territorial collectivity of Corsica.

The nationalist alliance Pè a Corsica between autonomist Femu a Corsica and separatist Corsica Libera won an outright majority of seats in the assembly under the list led by Gilles Simeoni.

== Background ==
Territorial elections to elect the Corsican Assembly were held on 3 and 10 December as a result of the creation of a single collectivity replacing the existing departments of Haute-Corse and Corse-du-Sud and the existing territorial collectivity of Corsica on 1 January 2018. While the creation of a territorial collectivity was rejected by voters in Corsica in a 2003 referendum, 42 of 51 members of the Corsican Assembly voted in support of a proposal to create a single territorial collectivity on 12 December 2014, with the support of the national government. The initiative was pushed by nationalists on the island, who won a majority of seats in the 2015 territorial elections, who argued that the division of Corsica into separate departments produced "nests of clientelism".

While the duration of the term of the assembly is usually six years, the elections were held early due to the creation of the single collectivity, with the territorial elections taking place in 2021.

On 1 January 2018, the two departments were dissolved, with the capital based in Ajaccio and an advisory "chamber of territories" in Bastia composed of local elected officials alongside the assembly. The assembly expanded from 51 to 63 members, with the executive council expanding from 9 to 11 members (including the president).

== Electoral system ==
Under the system used, unless a single list receives a majority of votes in the first round, a second round will be held, in which lists obtaining at least 7 percent of the overall vote in the first round will automatically advance, while those receiving between 5 and 7 percent will be offered the chance to merge with a list that received at least 7 percent of the vote. In the second round, the list receiving a plurality of votes will receive an 18% bonus representing 11 seats in the assembly, with the remaining seats allocated proportionally based on the vote percentage for each list.

The newly elected assembly then appoints the members of the executive council by a first-past-the-post vote requiring an absolute majority, voting on a list of 11 individuals – the president and ten councillors to the president.

== Lists and candidates ==
List and composition	List leader
Voir plus grand: Miscellaneous right (The Republicans support)	Valérie Bozzi
L'avenir, la Corse en commun – L'avvene, a Corsica in cummunu: La Corse Insoumise; French Communist Party	Jacques Casamarta
Pè a Corsica: Pè a Corsica; Femu a Corsica; Corsica Libera	Gilles Simeoni
Andà Per Dumane !: La République En Marche!	Jean-Charles Orsucci
Front national – Rassemblement pour une Corse républicaine: National Front	Charles Giacomi
Core in fronte: Rinnovu	Paul-Félix Benedetti
La voie de l'avenir, a strada di l'avvene: Regionalist right	Jean-Martin Mondoloni

Following the start of the official campaign on 20 November, seven lists were presented in Corsica, with the ecologist list of Jean-Francois Baccarelli, "A voce di a natura corsa", suspended due to a lack of funds. No list of the Socialist Party (PS) or Radical Party of the Left (PRG) was presented due to the conviction and imprisonment of Paul Giacobbi for embezzlement of public funds in January 2017.

The nationalist alliance between autonomist Femu a Corsica and separatist Corsica Libera, Pè a Corsica, was renewed for the 2017 elections under Gilles Simeoni, but did not directly address the question of independence during the campaign. A second nationalist list, "Core in fronte" representing Rinnovu, was presented by Paul-Félix Benedetti, supporting a self-determination referendum to restore an independent Corsican state and attacking a disorderly "mafia society" on the island. Benedetti proposed an alliance with Pé a Corsica, but Simeoni rejected the idea. Jean-Charles Orsucci obtained the nomination of La République En Marche! (REM), while the National Front (FN) presented a list, "Rassemblement pour une Corse républicaine", led by Charles Giacomi. Two opposing lists on the right failed to receive the nomination of The Republicans (LR). Valérie Bozzi, LR mayor of Grosseto-Prugna-Porticcio, led the list "Voir plus grand", with the unofficial support of the party, while Jean-Martin Mondoloni led a regionalist right list, "La voie de l'avenir, a strada di l'avvene". "La Corse Insoumise", supporters of Jean-Luc Mélenchon, allied with the French Communist Party (PCF) under the list "L'avenir, la Corse en commun – L'avvene, a Corsica in cummunu"; however, the list lacked the support of La France Insoumise, with Mélenchon denouncing any alliance with the PCF.

After the first round, Jacques Casamarta announced that his list would not join an alliance in order to compete in the second round. Paul-Félix Benedetti, leader of Rinnovu, also ruled out any alliance with Pé a Corsica, as he had during the campaign. Jean-Charles Orsucci, leader of the "Andà Per Dumane !" list, rejected an alliance against the nationalists. Though Jean-Martin Mondoloni and Valérie Bozzi, the leaders of the two lists on the right, made contact the evening of the election, an alliance was considered unlikely, given the degree of the nationalists' success in the first round. Mondolini stated the following day that the two lists would not merge, meaning that four lists contested the second round.

== Results ==
Leader	List	First round		Second round		Seats	
Leader	List	Votes	%	Votes	%	Seats	%
Gilles Simeoni	PaC (FC–CL)	54,212	45.36	67,253	56.46	41	65.08
Jean-Martin Mondoloni	Regionalist right	17,891	14.97	21,784	18.29	10	15.87
Jean-Charles Orsucci	REM	13,455	11.26	15,080	12.66	6	9.52
Valérie Bozzi	DVD (LR support)	15,265	12.77	14,990	12.59	6	9.52
Paul-Félix Benedetti	Rinnovu	7,996	6.69				
Jacques Casamarta	CI–PCF	6,787	5.68				
Charles Giacomi	FN	3,917	3.28				
Total		119,523	100.00	119,107	100.00	63	100.00
Valid votes		119,523	97.91	119,107	96.75		
Blank votes		1,251	1.02	2,079	1.69		
Null votes		1,301	1.07	1,923	1.56		
Turnout		122,075	52.10	123,109	52.55		
Abstentions		112,213	47.90	111,180	47.45		
Registered voters		234,288		234,289			
Source: Ministry of the Interior (first round), Ministry of the Interior (second round)
