= Pè a Corsica =

Corsican political coalition

For Corsica Pè a Corsica
- Leader: Gilles Simeoni
- Founded: 2015
- Dissolved: 2021
- Headquarters: Corsica
- Ideology: Corsican nationalism

Pè a Corsica (English: For Corsica) was a Corsican nationalist political alliance in France, which was calling for more autonomy for Corsica. More specifically, it was a coalition of the two Corsican nationalist parties active on the island; that is, the moderately autonomist Femu a Corsica and the strongly committed separatist Corsica Libera (which won respectively 17.62% and 7.73% of the vote in the first round of the 2015 French regional elections). The party was led by the autonomist Gilles Simeoni. The alliance was renewed for the 2017 territorial election. However, the alliance was dissolved for the 2021 territorial election.

== Background ==
Corsican nationalism calls for the island's autonomy in France, if not outright independence, following a movement developed since the 1920s with the establishment of the regionalist Corsican Action Party (Partitu Corsu d'Azzione/Parti Corse d'Action) in the town of Bastia. The 2003 Corsican referendum on increased devolution failed by a narrow majority. From the 1970s up until 2014, there have also been many bombings and aggravated assaults claimed by a militant group going by the name of FLNC. By 2012, polls showed more support for increased devolution within France (51%) than for outright independence (stuck at 10–15%).

== Electoral performance ==
In the December 2015 French regional elections in Corsica, Pè a Corsica won 24 of 51 seats. Gilles Simeoni won the election for the position of Mayor of Bastia with 35.34% of the vote. Jean-Guy Talamoni, leader of Corsica Libera, said: "It’s been a 40-year-long march to arrive here. Corsica is not just a French administrative constituency – it’s a country, a nation, a people."
