= Corsican autonomy =

On the autonomy of the French island of Corsica

Flag of Corsica

Corsican autonomy is the idea and movement supporting the status of an autonomous region for the island of Corsica within the French Republic. Most supporters of greater autonomy are Corsican nationalists. The ruling Femu a Corsica party supports an autonomous status for Corsica.

== Constitutional history ==
Corsica has been a part of France since it was purchased from the rulers of Genoa in 1768 and was then conquered by the French.

The administrative region of Corsica and the Corsican Assembly was formed in 1982 as the "collectivité territoriale de Corse''. In the process, the region gained further political powers compared to mainland French local authorities.

Statutes or laws passed in 1982, 1991 and 2002 have preceded devolution to Corsica, similarly to other French regions, with no specific devolution for Corsica. Although the Corsican Assembly has some regulatory powers, it cannot legislate. The Matignon proposals of July 2000 negotiated between the French government and Corsican councillors included power for national laws. Although a Corsican law was adopted on 22 January 2002 it was not completed due to disapproval of the Constitutional Council (France).

=== 2003 autonomy referendum ===
In 2003, constitutional reforms were rejected in the 2003 Corsican autonomy referendum. The referendum took place on July 6 2003 offered partial autonomy. Over 49% voted in favour with over 50% voting against in a 60% turnout. The margin of victory was 2,190 votes, with the referendum coming only two days after arrest of Yvan Colonna who was suspected of killing Prefect Claude Erignac, the most senior French official in Corsica.

In March 2003, President Sarkozy permitted experimental powers to adapt laws over a limited period and under the supervision of the French Parliament and further financial autonomy for French territorial entities.

=== 2023 offer of further autonomy ===
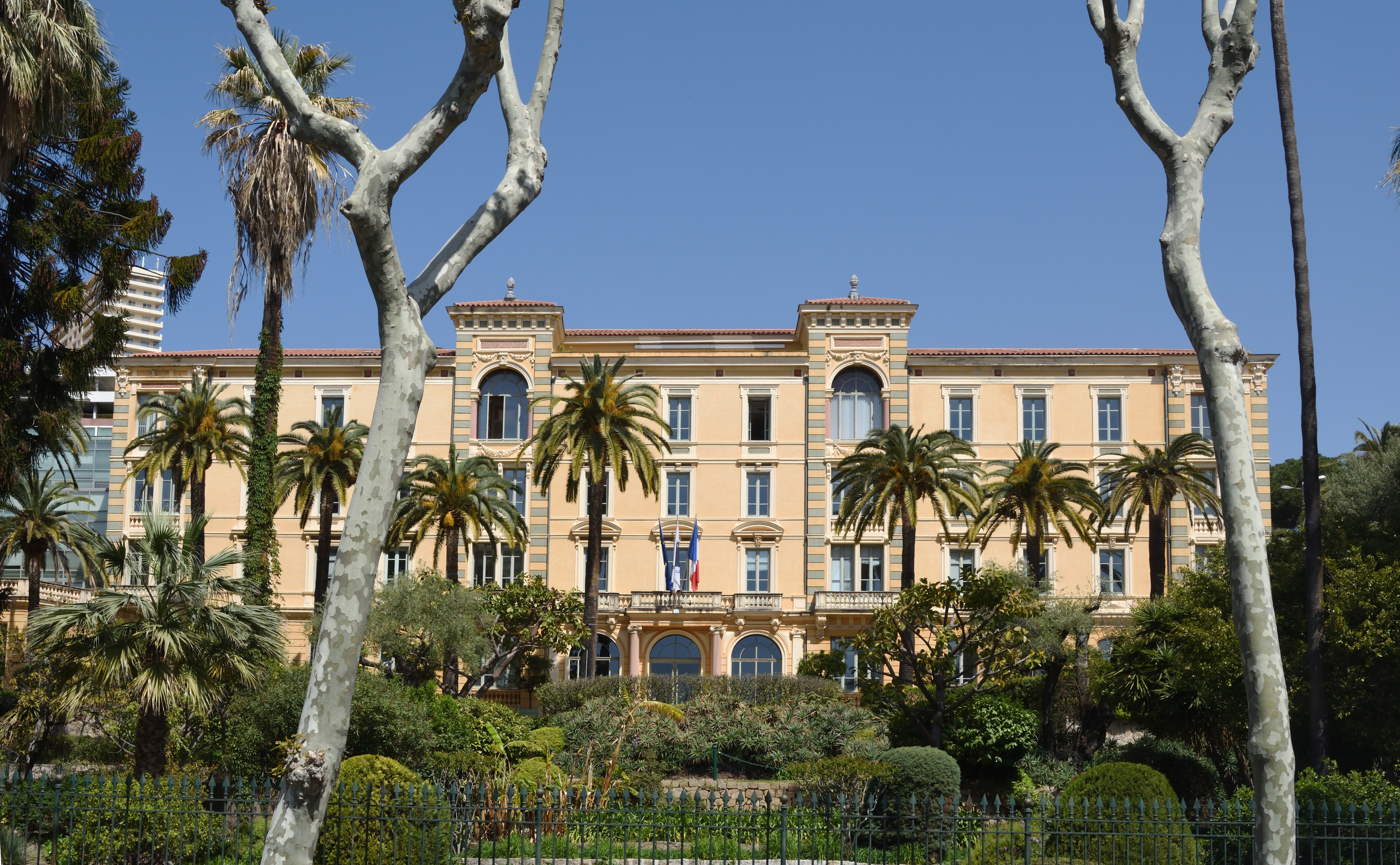
Ajaccio Grand Hôtel Oriental, location of the Corsican Assembly.

In 2018, French president Emmanuel Macron visited Corsica and stated his opposition to recognising the Corsican language and in pardoning Corsican militants.

During the Corsican protests of 2022, the French government said it could offer autonomy to Corsica. Interior minister Gérald Darmanin said, "We are ready to go as far as autonomy – there you go, the word has been said'. The minister said that there would be 'no dialogue' on the matter until violent protests ended. As of 16 March 2022 rioting had ensued for two weeks in which 100 people were injured. Public buildings and police were both targeted with homemade explosive devices.

On 28 September 2023, President of France, Emmanuel Macron gave a speech at the Corsican Regional Assembly in Ajaccio. In it, he offered "autonomy for Corsica and within the republic" via "a constitutional and organic text to be submitted for approval within six months", to be agreed between Corsican politicians and the French government. This would allow "the possibility of defining standards on different topics or transfer of powers" which are still controlled by the French Council of State and the French Constitutional Council. This was the first time that a French president publicly endorsed Corsican autonomy.

In July 2025, the French government offered Corsica an autonomous status within France with powers set by a basic law under supervision of the French judicial system. The Corsican Assembly would receive regulatory powers and Corsicans would be recognised as a cultural, historical and linguistic community. The proposal requires approval by both chambers of the French parliament to come into effect with changes to the Constitution of France. Conservative critics have argued against the autonomy proposal, saying that it could reportedly inspire other groups seeking autonomy such as the Bretons and the Basques.

== Political and public support ==
A movement for internal self-determination for Corsica can be traced back to a document titled Autonomia in 1974.

After a 40-year militant campaign for Corsican independence following the founding of the Corsican National Liberation Front (FLNC) in 1976, militants laid down arms in 2014.

In the second-round voting of the 2017 Corsican regional election, a coalition of nationalist politicians, Pè a Corsica won 56.5% of the vote and the president of France's party, La République en Marche, polled third with 12.7% of votes. The nationalist coalition win was brought about by an agreement two years prior between the autonomists led by Gilles Simeoni (chairman of the Corsica executive council) and supporters of full independence, led by Jean-Guy Talamoni (Corsica assembly speaker). The movement Pè a Corsica (For Corsica) has the aim of achieving autonomy rather than independence due to significant funding from France.

In 2022, Gilles Simeoni noted that 70% of Corsican electorate that voted "in favour of a nationalist list" in the 2021 Corsican territorial election.

=== Specific matters ===
In 2017, the leaders of Pè a Corsica; pro-autonomy Gilles Simeoni and pro-independence Jean-Guy Talamoni called for further autonomy, special status for Corsica greater autonomy, equal status for the Corsican language alongside French and amnesty for Corsicans that were jailed for violence in support of independence. The nationalist leaders also called for Corsican residency status, which would be aimed at tackling property speculation said to be caused by foreign investment.

=== Opinion polling ===
A 2017 poll showed 51% in favour of further autonomy (10% were in favour of independence).

A 2022 poll showed 53% in favour of full autonomy status (35% were in favour of independence).

== See also ==
- Corsican nationalism
- 2003 Corsican autonomy referendum
- Sardinian nationalism
- Occitan nationalism
- Breton nationalism
- Reunification of Brittany
