= Mayor of Bastia =

- Arms of Bastia
- Incumbent; Pierre Savelli since 7 January 2016
- Style: City Mayor
- Website: bastia.corsica

The mayor of Bastia is the head of Bastia City Council. The mayor is an elected politician who, along with the 49 members of Bastia City Council, is responsible for the strategic government of the city of Bastia, Corsica, France.

The current mayor is Pierre Savelli, elected on 7 January 2016.

== Mayors of Bastia ==
Mayor	Term start	Term end	Party	Notes
Pierre Poggi	1770	1778		
Pierre-François Rigo	1779	1789		
B. Carrafa	1789	1791		
Jean-Baptiste Galeazzini	1791	1794		Public whistleblower (Re-elected 1793)
Casimir Poggi	1794	1795		
Pierre-Antoine Cassela	1795	1796		
Jean Benedetti	1796	1798		
Dominique Bozio	1798	1798		
Paul-Louis Stefanini	1798	1798		
Jean-Baptiste Ristori	1798	1799		
Pierre-Antoine Cassela	1799	1800		
Ignace Agostini	1800	1800		
Pierre Giovellina	1800	1808		
Charles Cecconi	1808	1814		
Charles Vannucci	1814	1815		
Missing data are to be completed
Antoine Fabiani	1870	1871		Knight of the Legion of Honour
Missing data are to be completed
Auguste Gaudin	1888	1912		Journalist (1871-1877), Municipal Council (1878-1887)
Missing data are to be completed
Émile Sari	1919	1937		Senator (1921–1937)
Hyacinthe de Montera	1937	1941		
Joseph Gherardi	1941	1943		
Jacques Faggianelli	1943	1945	Radical	
Hyacinthe de Montera	1945	1947		
Jacques Faggianelli	1947	1967	Radical	
Jean Zuccarelli	1968	1989	MRG	Deputy of Corsica, then from Haute-Corse. Jean Zuccarelli is Auguste Gaudin’s son in law.
Émile Zuccarelli	1989	1997.	PRG	Deputy; Minister
Albert Calloni	1997	2000	PRG	
Émile Zuccarelli	2000	2014	PRG	Deputy
Gilles Simeoni	5 April 2014	2016 (Resigned)	Inseme per a Corsica	President of the Executive Council of Corsica
Pierre Savelli	7 January 2016	Incumbent	Inseme per a Corsica	Deputy mayor (2014–2016)

== See also ==
- Bastia
- Municipal council
- Municipal elections in France
- Mayor
