= Politics of Franche-Comté =

The politics of Franche-Comté, France takes place in a framework of a presidential representative democracy, whereby the President of Regional Council is the head of government, and of a pluriform multi-party system. Legislative power is vested in the regional council.

== Executive ==
The executive of the region is led by the President of the regional council.

== Legislative branch ==
The Regional Council of Franche-Comté (Conseil régional de Franche-Comté) is composed of 43 councillors, elected by proportional representation in a two-round system. The winning list in the second round is automatically entitled to a quarter of the seats. The remainder of the seats are allocated through proportional representation with a 5% threshold.

The Council is elected for a six-year term.

=== Current composition ===
Party		seats
•	Socialist Party	16
	Union for a Popular Movement	12
•	The Greens	6
	National Front	5
•	Miscellaneous Left	3
•	Association for a Republican Left	1

== Elections ==
=== Other elections ===
In the 2007 legislative election, the UMP won 11 seats and the Socialist Party won two seats.
