= 2015 French regional elections =

← 2010	6 and 13 December 2015	2021 →

All 17 regional presidencies All 1,757 regional councillors All 153 territorial councillors
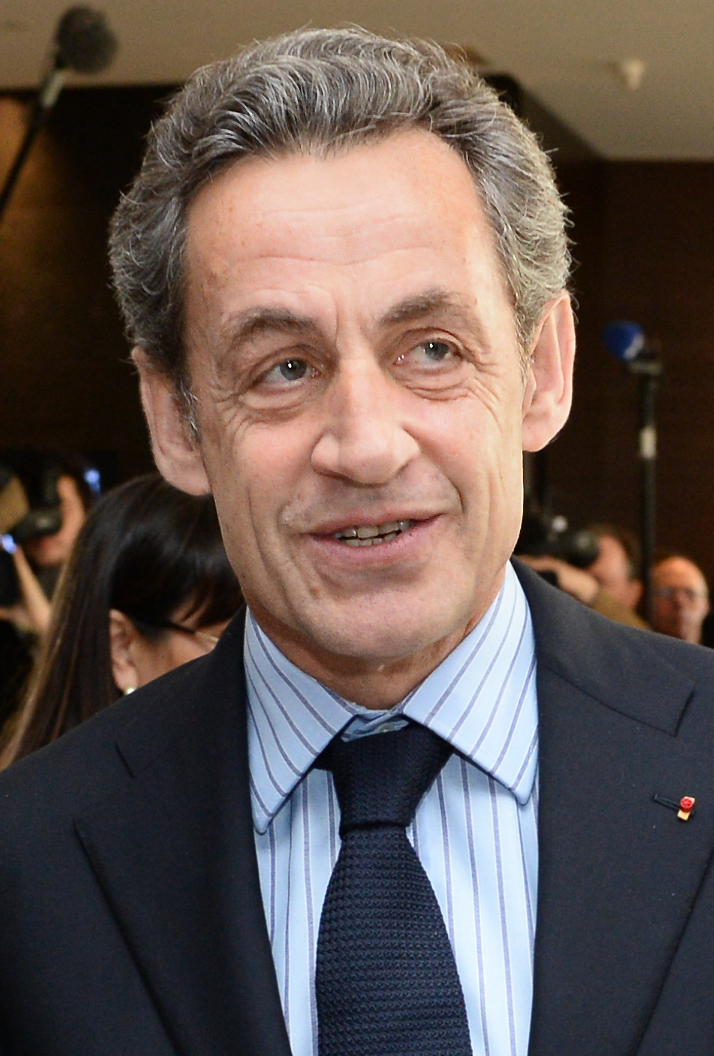

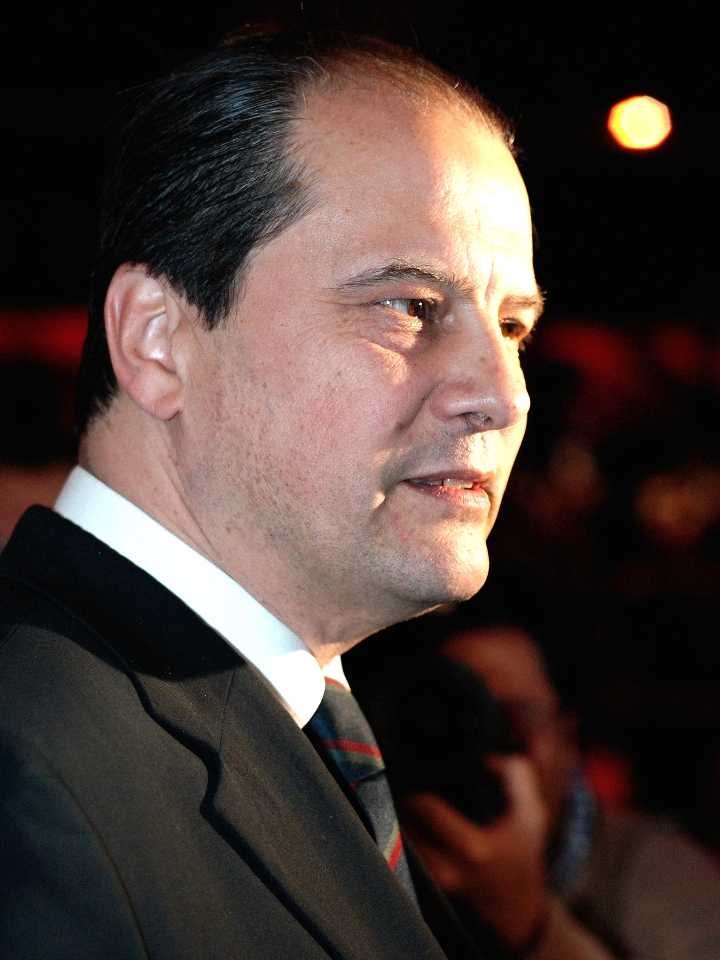

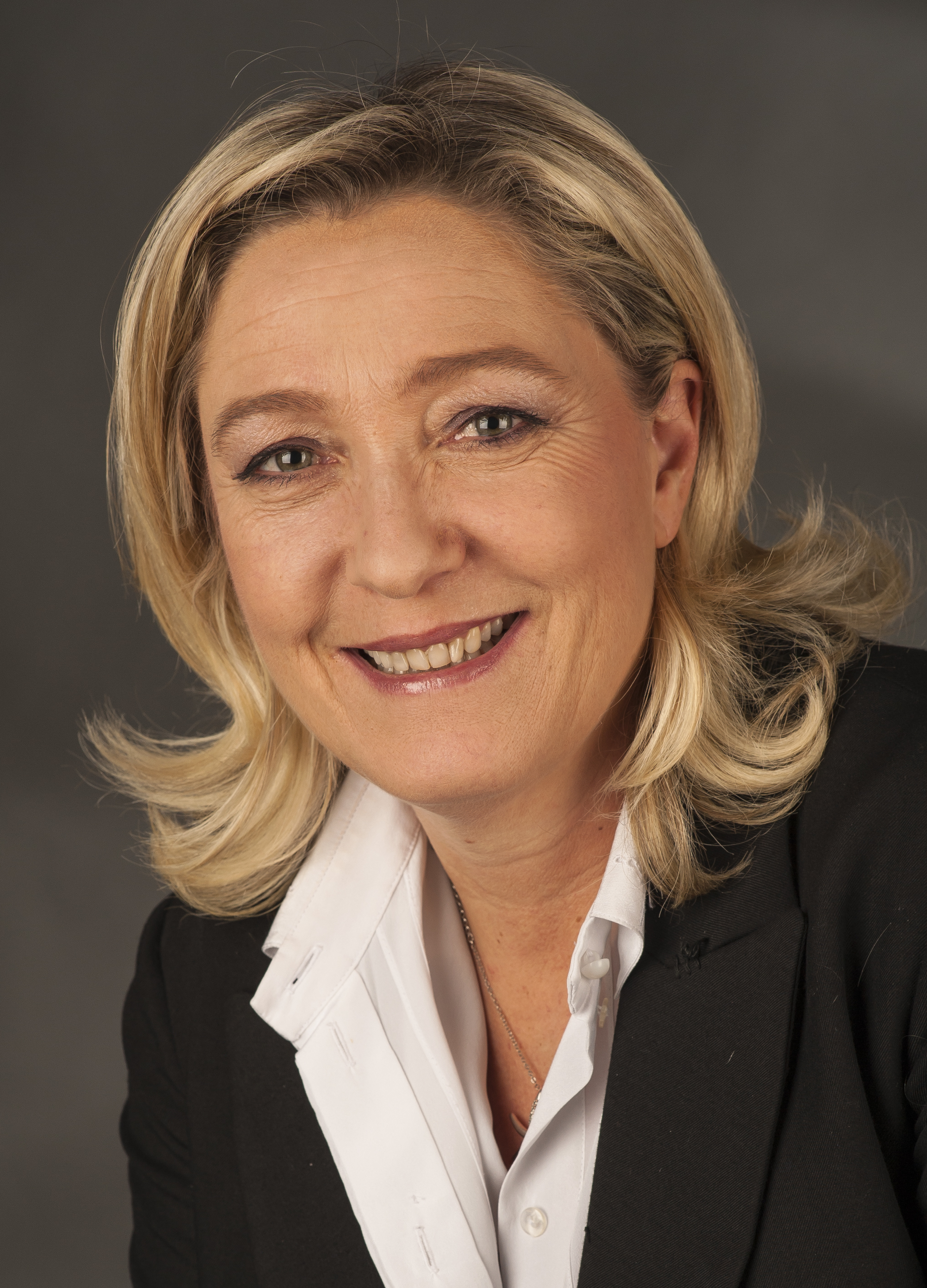
	First party	Second party	Third party
Leader	Nicolas Sarkozy	Jean-Christophe Cambadélis	Marine Le Pen
Party	LR	PS	FN
Regions won	7 + 1 (UDI)	5 + 1 (GUSR) + 1 (GR)	0
Change	▲5	▼15	Steady
First round	5,785,073; 26.65% ▲0.63	5,019,723; 23.12% ▼6.02	6,018,672; 27.73% ▲16.31
Second round	10,127,196; 40.24% ▲4.87	7,263,567; 28.86% ▼20.66	6,820,147; 27.10% ▲17.93
- Second round results by region. The Republicans and Union of Democrats and Independents Socialist Party Regionalists Miscellaneous left

Regional elections were held in France on 6 and 13 December 2015. At stake were the regional councils in metropolitan and overseas France including the Corsican Assembly and inaugural seats in the Assembly of French Guiana and Assembly of Martinique, all for a six-year term. The Departmental Council of Mayotte, which also exercises the powers of a region, was the only region not participating in this election, having already been renewed on 2 April 2015. There were 18 regional presidencies at stake, with 13 in mainland France and Corsica, as well as 5 overseas. Though they do not have legislative autonomy, these territorial collectivities manage sizable budgets. Moreover, regional elections are often taken as a mid-term opinion poll.

These elections were the first to be held for the redrawn regions: the 27 regions of France were amalgamated into 18, this went into effect on 1 January 2016.

The election saw a huge swing away from the centre-left Socialist Party, as well as a small swing to the centre-right Republicans. However, there was a double-digit swing to the right-wing National Rally in both the first round and the second round. Despite this, National Rally did not win any regional presidencies.

== Voting system ==
The regional elections are held in direct universal suffrage using proportional representation lists. The election is held over two rounds, with majority bonus. The lists must be gender balanced by alternatively have a male candidate and a female candidate from the top to the bottom of the list. Only lists with as many candidates as available seats in every departement of the region may compete. Before 2004, lists could be presented only at the departement level, allowing smaller parties (e.g. Hunting, Fishing, Nature, Tradition, Alsace d'abord, Lutte Ouvrière, Revolutionary Communist League) to be represented as such in the regional councils and thus forcing major parties to enter into negotiations to rule some regions.

Following the 1999 and 2003 electoral reforms, with a first implementation in 2004, a two-round runoff voting system is used to elect the regional presidents. If no party gets at least 50% of the vote in the first round, a second round is held, which any party who got at least 10% in the first round may enter. Lists that obtain at least 5% of the vote in the first round may merge in the second round with a 'qualified list', which includes candidates from each merged list.

At the decisive round (first round if a list won 50%, the second round if not), the leading list receives a premium of 25% of the seats while the remaining seats are distributed among all lists who received at least 5% of votes. Thus, the majority bonus allows a leading list to have an absolute majority of seats in the Regional Council from one-third of votes in the second round. The seats are distributed among the lists at the regional level but within each list, seats are allocated by departement branch in proportion to the number of votes in each department.

== National results ==
France uses a two-round runoff system to elect the regional presidencies, and as such not all seats contested will see a candidate elected in the first round.

=== First round ===
The first round election was held on 6 December 2015.

List	Votes	Votes %
Union of the Left	5,019,723	23.12
Europe Ecology – The Greens	1,440,226	6.63
Left Front	541,409	2.49
Miscellaneous left	401,517	1.85
French Communist Party	337,390	1.55
Socialist Party	62,070	0.29
Radical Party of the Left	4,227	0.02
**Total left-wing**	**7,806,562**	**35.96**
Union of the Right	5,785,073	26.65
France Arise	827,262	3.81
Miscellaneous right	142,836	0.66
Democratic Movement	85,450	0.39
The Republicans	42,346	0.20
Union of Democrats and Independents	1,818	0.01
**Total right-wing**	**6,884,785**	**31.72**
National Front	6,018,672	27.73
Miscellaneous far-right	34,061	0.16
**Total far-right**	**6,052,733**	**27.89**
Miscellaneous far-left	334,140	1.54
Regionalists	273,431	1.26
Popular Republican Union	189,046	0.87
Miscellaneous ecologists	127,451	0.59
Miscellaneous other	39,883	0.18
**Total**	22,609,602	**100**
Registered voters/turnout	45,298,641	49.91

=== Second round ===
Runoff elections were held on 13 December 2015 in regions where no candidate was able to win outright in the first round.

After the first round, the Socialist Party withdrew its lists in the regions of Provence-Alpes-Côte d'Azur and Hauts-de-France, where they finished in third place, in an attempt to block the Front National from winning seats in the second round due to split opposition from the centre-left and centre-right blocs. However, despite instructions from the party, the Socialist candidate chose to maintain his list in the region of Le Grand-Est, which similarly had them in third and the FN with a sizable lead after the first round.

The result was a disappointment for the Front National, which was unable to win any of the regional presidencies in the face of concerted tactical voting. However, in both the north and the south, they managed to increase their share of the vote from the first round. Of the 12 regions in mainland France, 7 were won by the Republicans and 5 were retained by the Socialists.

List	Votes	Votes %	Seats	Seats %
**Union of the Right**	**10,127,196**	**40.63**	**818**	**42.83**
Union of the Left	7,263,567	29.14	520	27.23
Miscellaneous left	622,382	2.50	144	7.54
Socialist Party	18,288	0.07	13	0.68
**Total left-wing**	**7,904,237**	**31.71**	**677**	**35.45**
**National Front**	**6,820,147**	**27.36**	**358**	**18.74**
**Regionalists**	**72,829**	**0.29**	**57**	**2.98**
**Total**	**24,924,409**	**100**	**1914**	**100**
Registered voters/turnout	44,832,737	58.44		

=== By region ===
The following table shows regional presidents before and after the elections, with merged regions shown alongside the region taking effect in 2016. The candidates on the left were the incumbents, whereas the candidates on the right were those elected (or re-elected) to the new regions. In the case of Corsica and Martinique, multiple presidencies were at stake.

Region		President Before	Party	Region		President After	Party
Alsace		Philippe Richert	LR	Grand Est		Philippe Richert	LR
Champagne-Ardenne		Jean-Paul Bachy	DVG	Grand Est		Philippe Richert	LR
Lorraine		Jean-Pierre Masseret	PS	Grand Est		Philippe Richert	LR
Aquitaine		Alain Rousset	PS	Nouvelle-Aquitaine		Alain Rousset	PS
Limousin		Gérard Vandenbroucke	PS	Nouvelle-Aquitaine		Alain Rousset	PS
Poitou-Charentes		Jean-François Macaire	PS	Nouvelle-Aquitaine		Alain Rousset	PS
Auvergne		René Souchon	PS	Auvergne-Rhône-Alpes		Laurent Wauquiez	LR
Rhône-Alpes		Jean-Jack Queyranne	PS	Auvergne-Rhône-Alpes		Laurent Wauquiez	LR
Burgundy		François Patriat	PS	Bourgogne-Franche-Comté		Marie-Guite Dufay	PS
Franche-Comté		Marie-Guite Dufay	PS	Bourgogne-Franche-Comté		Marie-Guite Dufay	PS
Brittany		Pierrick Massiot	PS	Brittany		Jean-Yves Le Drian	PS
Centre-Val de Loire		François Bonneau	PS	Centre-Val de Loire		François Bonneau	PS
Corsica	Assembly	Dominique Bucchini	PCF	Corsica	Assembly	Jean-Guy Talamoni	CL
Corsica	Executive Council	Paul Giacobbi	DVG	Corsica	Executive Council	Gilles Simeoni	FC
French Guiana	Regional Council	Rodolphe Alexandre	GR	French Guiana	Assembly	Rodolphe Alexandre	GR
French Guiana	General Council	Alain Tien-Liong	MDES	French Guiana	Assembly	Rodolphe Alexandre	GR
Guadeloupe		Victorin Lurel	PS	Guadeloupe		Ary Chalus	GUSR
Île-de-France		Jean-Paul Huchon	PS	Île-de-France		Valérie Pécresse	LR
Languedoc-Roussilon		Damien Alary	PS	Occitania (administrative region)		Carole Delga	PS
Midi-Pyrénées		Martin Malvy	PS	Occitania (administrative region)		Carole Delga	PS
Réunion		Didier Robert	LR	Réunion		Didier Robert	LR
Martinique	Regional Council	Serge Letchimy	PPM	Martinique	Assembly	Claude Lise	RDM
Martinique	General Council	Josette Manin	BPM	Martinique	Executive Council	Alfred Marie-Jeanne	MIM
Nord-Pas-de-Calais		Daniel Percheron	PS	Hauts-de-France		Xavier Bertrand	LR
Picardy		Claude Gewerc	PS	Hauts-de-France		Xavier Bertrand	LR
Lower Normandy		Laurent Beauvais	PS	Normandy		Hervé Morin	UDI
Upper Normandy		Nicolas Mayer-Rossignol	PS	Normandy		Hervé Morin	UDI
Pays de la Loire		Jacques Auxiette	PS	Pays de la Loire		Bruno Retailleau	LR
Provence-Alpes-Côte d'Azur		Michel Vauzelle	PS	Provence-Alpes-Côte d'Azur		Christian Estrosi	LR

The following table shows each major party's performance by region. The bolded candidates received the most votes, and were thus elected president of their respective regions.

Region	Union of the Right	Union of the Left	National Front	Regionalists
Auvergne-Rhône-Alpes	**Laurent Wauquiez**; **1,201,528 (40.61%)**	Jean-Jack Queyranne; 1,089,791 (36.84%)	Christophe Boudot; 667,084 (22.55%)	
Bourgogne-Franche-Comté	François Sauvadet; 382,177 (32.89%)	**Marie-Guite Dufay**; **402,941 (34.68%)**	Sophie Montel; 376,902 (32.44%)	
Brittany	Marc Le Fur; 387.836 (29.72%)	**Jean-Yves Le Drian**; **670,754 (51.41%)**	Gilles Pennelle; 246,177 (18.87%)	
Centre-Val de Loire	Philippe Vigier; 355,475 (34.58%)	**François Bonneau**; **364,211 (35.43%)**	Philippe Loiseau; 308,422 (30.0%)	
Corsica	José Rossi; 40,480 (27.07%)	Paul Giacobbi; 42,607 (28.09%)	Christophe Canioni; 13,599 (9.09%)	**Gilles Simeoni**; **52,839 (35.34%)**
French Guiana		**Rodolphe Alexandre**; **21,163 (54.55%)**		Alain Tien-Liong; 17,361 (45.45%)
Grand Est	**Philippe Richert**; **1,060,029 (48.4%)**	Jean-Pierre Masseret; 339,749 (15.51%)	Florian Philippot; 790,141 (36.08%)	
Guadeloupe		Victorin Lurel; 72,721 (42.48)		**Ary Chalus**; **98,464 (57.42%)**
Hauts-de-France	**Xavier Bertrand**; **1,389,316 (57.7%)**	Withdrew	Marine Le Pen; 1,015,649 (42.23%)	
Île-de-France	**Valérie Pécresse**; **1,629,249 (43.8%)**	Claude Bartolone; 1,569,093 (42.18%)	Wallerand de Saint-Just; 521,383 (14.02%)	
Martinique		Serge Letchimy; 70,776 (45.86%)		**Alfred Marie-Jeanne**; **83,541 (54.14%)**
Normandy	**Hervé Morin**; **495,591 (36.43%)**	Nicolas Mayer-Rossignol; 490,840 (36.08%)	Nicolas Bay; 374,089 (27.5%)	
Nouvelle-Aquitaine	Virginie Calmels; 798,142 (34.06%)	**Alain Rousset**; **1,037,330 (44.27%)**	Jacques Colombier; 507,660 (21.67%)	
Occitanie	Dominique Reynié; 520,011 (21.32%)	**Carole Delga**; **1,092,969 (48.81%)**	Louis Aliot; 826,023 (33.87%)	
Pays de la Loire	**Bruno Retailleau**; **620,245 (42.7%)**	Christophe Clergeau; 545,637 (37.56%)	Pascal Gannat; 286,723 (19.74%)	
Provence-Alpes-Côte d'Azur	**Christian Estrosi**; **1,073,485 (54.78%)**	Withdrew	Marion Maréchal; 886,147 (45.22%)	
Réunion	**Didier Robert**; **173,592 (52.69%)**	Huguette Bello; 155,896 (47.31%)		
