= Rinnovu =

National Renewal Rinnovu Naziunale
- Leader: Paul-Félix Benedetti
- Spokesperson: Gérard Dykstra
- Founded: 17 November 1998
- Ideology: Corsican nationalism Corsican independence Socialism; Humanism
- Corsican Assembly: 6 / 63

Website
- www.inforinnovu.com

Rinnovu Naziunale (transl. National Renewal) is a separatist political party active in Corsica, France.

== History ==
Rinnovu was a member of Corsica Libera between 2008 and 2013.
