= Plural Left (Guadeloupe) =

Plural Left Gauche Plurielle
- Political position: Left-wing

The Plural Left (French: Gauche Plurielle) was a political party in the French overseas department of Guadeloupe. The party has one seat in the French National Assembly in the group of the Socialist Party.
