= Territorial collectivity =

French term for devolved legal power

A territorial collectivity (French: collectivité territoriale, previously collectivité locale), or territorial authority, in many francophone countries, is an administrative division governed by public law that exercises within its territory certain powers devolved to it by the State as part of a decentralization process. In France, it also refers to a chartered administrative division of France with recognized governing authority. It is the generic name for any territory with an elective form of local government and local regulatory authority. The nature of a French territorial collectivity is set forth in Article 72 of the Constitution of France (1958), which provides for local autonomy within limits prescribed by law.

== Overview ==
=== Use of the term ===
The term collectivité territoriale is used in Burkina Faso, in France by its legislation and the Constitution, in Mali and in Morocco.

In Algeria and Senegal, they refer to it as collectivité locale. However, in France, it is also used by the State administration: the Direction Générale des Collectivités Locales deals with matters relating to local authorities.

In English-speaking countries, the term used is local government or local government area, and in German is Gebietskörperschaft.

=== Characteristics ===
Territorial authorities have legal status. They are often administered by a deliberative assembly, which may be elected by direct universal suffrage. Depending on local legislation, they may levy local taxes and receive funds from the State.

== Categories ==
- Regions: France has 18 regions, or 14 not including single territorial collectivities (collectivities with special status).
- Departments: France has 94 departments as territorial collectivities (most recently the merger of the territorial collectivities of Bas-Rhin and Haut-Rhin to form the European Collectivity of Alsace). However, the word is also used for the 101 territorial divisions of the State administration, which in most cases cover the same area as territorial collectivities.
- Single territorial collectivities: this status, first created in 2011, is awarded by French collectivity law to four collectivities which have the combined attributions of both a department and a region (Corsica, French Guiana, Martinique and Mayotte). It is not legally coterminous with a collectivity with particular status, which applies to Corsica, Paris and the Metropolis of Lyon, though INSEE considers all six collectivies to fall under the latter term.
- Overseas collectivities (collectivités d'outre-mer, COM): France has five COMs.
- Provinces: There are 3 provinces, all in New Caledonia.
- Communes: There are 36,782 communes. They are found throughout the republic (except for Saint Barthélemy, Saint Martin, Wallis and Futuna, which are subdivided differently, as well as uninhabited Clipperton Island, which is directly administered by the office of the Prime Minister and the Minister of Overseas France).

== Administration ==
- The assembly of a région and of a ROM is the regional council (conseil régional). They are presided over by a president of the regional council (président du conseil régional).
  - Corsica's assembly is called the assemblée de Corse (Corsican Assembly) that exercises some Corsican autonomy. It is also presided over by the president of the regional council.
- The assembly of a département (except Paris) or that of a DOM is called a conseil départemental. It is presided over by a président du conseil départemental.
- The assembly of a province is called an assemblée de province. It is presided over by a président de l'assemblée de province.
- A commune's assembly (except that of Paris) is called a conseil municipal. It is presided over by a mayor (maire).
  - The Paris assembly is called the conseil de Paris. It is also presided over by a mayor.
- The Assembly of French Polynesia is presided over by the président de la Polynésie française.
- Saint Barthélemy, Saint Martin, and Saint Pierre and Miquelon's assemblies are called conseil territorial. Each of these is presided over by a président du conseil territorial.
- Wallis and Futuna's assembly is called an assemblée territoriale. It is presided over by the prefect (préfet).
- New Caledonia's assembly is called a congrès. It is presided over by the président du gouvernement.

== Past and future territorial collectivities ==
- The category of overseas territory (territoires d'outre-mer) was eliminated under the constitutional reform of 28 March 2003. French Southern Territories is still a TOM, but this is now a particular designation, not a category. This uninhabited territory no longer is a collectivité territoriale.
- Mayotte and Saint Pierre and Miquelon used to be collectivités territoriales belonging to no category (but with a status close to that of a DOM), sometimes unofficially called collectivité territoriale à statut particulier, or collectivité territoriale d'outre-mer.
- Mayotte held a vote in 2009 to change its status, and it became a ROM in 2011.
- Guadeloupians and Réunionnais have refused to eliminate their ROM and DOM in order to create a unique collectivité territoriale.
- The European Collectivity of Alsace became effective on the first day of 2021.

== Territorial authorities and European institutions ==
The Congress of Local and Regional Authorities of the Council of Europe is a pan-European political assembly made up of 648 regional and municipal councillors, mayors and regional presidents, elected for four-year terms. It represents 200,000 territorial authorities in 47 European countries, including France's 36,000 communes. As the voice of territorial authorities, towns and regions, the Congress is responsible for strengthening local and regional democracy in its 47 member states by promoting consultation and political dialogue between governments and territorial authorities. To this end, it cooperates with the Committee of Ministers of the Council of Europe. The work of the Congress is structured around its two chambers, the Chamber of Local Authorities and the Chamber of Regions, and is organized around three statutory committees: a Monitoring Committee, a Governance Committee and a Current Affairs Committee.

== Sustainable development applied to territorial authorities ==
In June 1992, at the Earth Summit in Rio de Janeiro, a plan of action for the 21st century called Agenda 21 was adopted, applying to territorial authorities, regions, départements, communities of communes or municipalities. The action plan was divided into 40 chapters, with a preamble and four sections. It includes recommendations in areas as varied as poverty, health, housing, pollution, the management of seas, forests and mountains, desertification, the management of water resources and sanitation, agricultural management and waste management.

Most French regions have an Agenda 21. Taking all territorial authorities together, there were 1128 local agendas listed in France in 2017.

== Other facts ==
- New Caledonia is the only French local government that is not a collectivité territoriale. It has its own articles in the French Constitution. Since it cannot be categorized, it is sometimes unofficially called a collectivité sui generis (although "collectivity" is not, strictly speaking, a legal category). It is also unofficially called a pays (d'outre-mer), because its local legislative assembly (the congress) can rule using its own lois du pays. New Caledonia voted in 1987, 2018, 2020 and 2021 to reject independence and maintain its current status of large autonomy gained from the national constitutional referendum of 1988.
- Corsica became the first collectivité territoriale unique that is within metropolitan France starting on 1 January 2018, with new territorial elections held as a result.
- The régions are divided into départements: ROMs are divided into DOMs; New Caledonia is divided into provinces; départements, COMs (except Saint Barthélemy, Saint-Martin, and Wallis and Futuna), DOMs, and provinces all are divided into communes.
- The commune of Poya is the only French subdivision assigned to two upper-level units (the provinces of North and South).
- Paris and some overseas entities belong to two categories.
  - Paris is both a département and a commune. It has one mayor and one assembly.
  - French Guiana, Guadeloupe, Martinique, Mayotte, and Réunion are both ROM and DOM. Guadeloupe and Réunion each have two presidents and two assemblies, while French Guiana, Martinique and Mayotte each have a single assembly.
- Each COM has its own statutory law that gives it a particular designation:
  - French Polynesia is designated as a pays d'outre-mer,
  - Saint Barthélemy and Saint Martin as collectivités,
  - Saint Pierre and Miquelon as a collectivité territoriale, and
  - Wallis and Futuna as a territoire.

== See also ==
- Local government
