= José Rossi =

French politician

José Rossi (born 18 June 1944 in Ajaccio) is a French politician, who served as the President of the Corsican Assembly from 1998 to 2004.
