= 2003 Corsican autonomy referendum =

- 6 July 2003
- Do you approve of the proposed suggestions to change the institutional organisation of Corsica represented in law 2003-486 of June 10, 2003?
- Outcome: Proposal was rejected

Results
Choice	Votes	%
Yes	54,990	49.02%
No	57,180	50.98%
Valid votes	112,170	97.56%
Invalid or blank votes	2,800	2.44%
Total votes	114,970	100.00%
Registered voters/turnout	189,992	60.51%
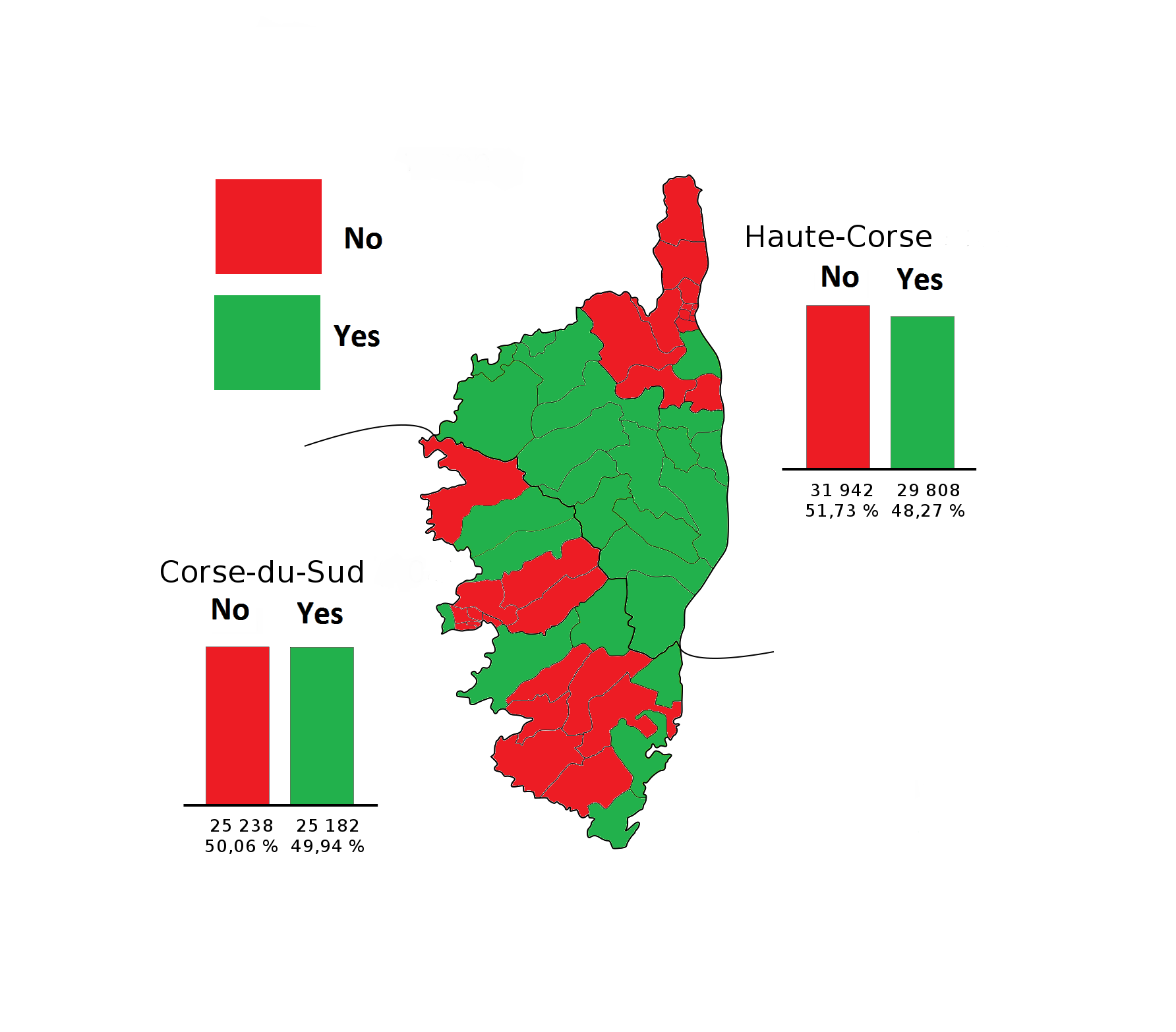
- Results by canton and department Yes No

A Corsican autonomy referendum was held on 6 July 2003. Voters were asked whether or not they approved the restructuring of the system of administration on Corsica. Had the referendum been successful, the two départements on the island would have been abolished leaving only the Corsican Assembly which would be granted additional functions including some limited powers on raising and spending taxes. The suggestion was not approved, albeit by a very small margin. 51% voted against the proposal, with 49% supporting it. The difference between the yes and no vote was 2,190 votes.

== Results ==
The question asked was: Do you approve of the proposed suggestions to change the institutional organisation of Corsica represented in law 2003-486 of June 10, 2003?

Do you approve of the proposed suggestions to change the institutional organisation of Corsica represented in law 2003-486 of June 10th 2003?
Choice	Votes	%
For	0	–
Against	0	–
Total		
Valid votes	112,170	97.56
Invalid/blank votes	2,800	2.44
Total votes	114,970	100.00

=== Results by Department ===
Department	Electoral participation	Yes		No	
Department	Electoral participation	Votes	%	Votes	%
Corse-du-Sud	60,22	25.182	49,94	25.238	50,06
Haute-Corse	60,77	29.808	48,27	31.942	51,73
Total	60,52	54.990	49,02	57.180	50,98

=== Results by Canton ===
	Choice	Voters	Valid voices	Election participation	Yes (%)	No (%)
AJACCIO I	5984	3883	3794	64,89 %	52,61 %	47,39 %
AJACCIO II	2197	1334	1298	60,72 %	43,22 %	56,78 %
AJACCIO III	4017	2487	2409	61,91 %	47,70 %	52,30 %
AJACCIO IV	3053	1721	1678	56,37 %	47,38 %	52,62 %
AJACCIO V	3885	2189	2144	56,34 %	44,08 %	55,92 %
AJACCIO VI	8714	4683	4537	53,74 %	46,75 %	53,25 %
AJACCIO VII	8711	5182	5069	59,49 %	43,72 %	56,28 %
ALTO-DI-CASACONI	2491	1574	1543	63,19 %	44,39 %	55,61 %
BASTELICA	2350	1484	1450	63,15 %	46,97 %	53,03 %
BASTIA I CENTRE	3105	2045	1995	65,86 %	36,99 %	63,01 %
BASTIA II	4826	3207	3127	66,45 %	31,28 %	68,72 %
BASTIA III	1417	874	853	61,68 %	34,23 %	65,77 %
BASTIA IV	1103	692	674	62,74 %	29,38 %	70,62 %
BASTIA V	4278	2406	2368	56,24 %	22,85 %	77,15 %
BASTIA VI	6899	4198	4144	60,85 %	22,03 %	77,97 %
BELGODÈRE	3193	1814	1752	56,81 %	57,25 %	42,75 %
BONIFACIO	1934	1006	957	52,02 %	51,10 %	48,90 %
BORGO	8828	5240	5157	59,36 %	66,01 %	33,99 %
BUSTANICO	2396	1456	1411	60,77 %	58,47 %	41,53 %
CALENZANA	4201	1459	1419	34,73 %	60,61 %	39,39 %
CALVI	3832	2425	2373	63,28 %	62,92 %	37,08 %
CAMPOLORO-DI-MORIANI	4388	2541	2493	57,91 %	58,97 %	41,03 %
CAPOBIANCO	2617	1759	1703	67,21 %	49,38 %	50,62 %
CASTIFAO-MOROSAGLIA	2918	1878	1832	64,36 %	51,75 %	48,25 %
CELAVO-MEZZANA	5555	3275	3176	58,96 %	46,85 %	53,15 %
CONCA-D'ORO	3476	2207	2143	63,49 %	40,41 %	59,59 %
CORTE	3436	2211	2129	64,35 %	57,59 %	42,41 %
CRUZINI-CINARCA	2194	1414	1372	64,45 %	52,33 %	47,67 %
DEUX-SEVI	2514	1608	1579	63,96 %	49,72 %	50,28 %
DEUX-SORRU	2906	1783	1742	61,36 %	62,00 %	38,00 %
FIGARI	2616	1582	1549	60,47 %	45,45 %	54,55 %
FIUMALTO-D'AMPUGNANI	3077	1777	1747	57,75 %	52,95 %	47,05 %
GHISONI	2821	1520	1482	53,88 %	51,48 %	48,52 %
HAUT-NEBBIO	2447	1558	1517	63,67 %	34,67 %	65,33 %
ÎLE-ROUSSE	4355	2431	2379	55,82 %	52,84 %	47,16 %
LEVIE	2728	1642	1590	60,19 %	46,67 %	53,33 %
MOïTA-VERDE	3316	1791	1748	54,01 %	57,32 %	42,68 %
NIOLU-OMESSA	2938	1645	1617	55,99 %	51,52 %	48,48 %
OLMETO	3582	2210	2148	61,70 %	48,18 %	51,82 %
OREZZA-ALESANI	1680	1152	1127	68,57 %	69,57 %	30,43 %
PETRETO-BICCHISANO	1762	1133	1096	64,30 %	49,45 %	50,55 %
PORTO-VECCHIO	8471	4630	4512	54,66 %	60,33 %	39,67 %
PRUNELLI-DI-FIUMORBO	4988	2799	2728	56,11 %	57,18 %	42,82 %
SAGRO-DI-SANTA-GIULIA	3240	2216	2148	68,40 %	38,64 %	61,36 %
SAN-MARTINO-DI-LOTA	5188	3441	3345	66,33 %	41,91 %	58,09 %
SARTÈNE	2861	1977	1922	69,10 %	44,43 %	55,57 %
SANTA-MARIE-SICHÉ	6495	4376	4270	67,37 %	55,06 %	44,94 %
TALLANO-SCOPAMÈNE	1625	1095	1073	67,38 %	43,71 %	56,29 %
VENACO	1765	1165	1129	66,01 %	63,77 %	36,23 %
VESCOVATO	5068	2737	2681	54,01 %	49,31 %	50,69 %
VEZZANI	1661	1024	986	61,65 %	61,16 %	38,84 %
ZICAVO	1865	1079	1055	57,86 %	70,05 %	29,95 %

=== Results according to constituencies ===
Constituency	Choice	Voters	Valid voices	Election participation	Yes (%)	No (%)
AJACCIO	41016	24876	24261	60,65 %	48,36 %	51,64 %
BASTIA	47424	29843	29174	62,93 %	39,52 %	60,48 %
CORTE BALAGNE	58524	33399	32576	57,07 %	56,11 %	43,89 %
SARTÈNE	45003	26897	26159	59,77 %	51,41 %	48,59 %

== See also ==
- Corsican nationalism
