= Corsican nationalism =

Southern European national identity

The flag of Corsica is similar to the traditional flag of Sardinia in Italy.

Location of Corsica

Corsican nationalism is the concept of a cohesive nation of Corsica and a national identity of its people. The Corsican autonomy movement stems from Corsican nationalism and advocates for further autonomy for the island, if not outright independence from France.

== History ==
=== Corsican Republic (1755–1769) ===
A sense of Corsican particularity can be traced back to the mid-18th century, when the island was fought over by the Genoese Republic and the Kingdom of France. Pasquale Paoli led a rebellion by Corsicans against the various foreign powers contesting the island, founding a short-lived independent state governed from Corte. Inspired by the Enlightenment political ideas currently becoming fashionable in Europe, Paoli set up a liberal constitutional republic: a deliberative assembly, the Diet, was elected through universal manhood suffrage, with evidence to suggest that female suffrage also existed. Paoli's practical exercise in Enlightened constitutional government was inspired by thinkers such as Voltaire and Rousseau, but also in turn inspired them, being the sole example of their political philosophies put into practice until the American Revolution a decade later. The French conquest of 1767 put an end to the experiment (with the exception of a brief British-governed separation from France during the French Revolutionary Wars), and the island was incorporated into the Kingdom of France. The memory of the brief period of self-rule would act as an inspiration to later regionalist and nationalist movements, even as many among Corsica's educated elites accepted a place in the French state, with Napoleon Bonaparte becoming the French head of state less than thirty years after the island was conquered by France.

=== Fin-de-siècle and the interwar (1890–1940) ===
As with most European nationalist and separatist movements, the 1890s saw the first stirrings of a consciousness of a distinct regional way of life, and the first ideas that regional culture should be reflected in distinct political institutions. With Corsica in an agricultural depression, misruled by powerful local political bosses, subject to mass emigration devastating rural communities, and increasingly confronted by the culture of the French state (which was encouraging cultural assimilation and administrative centralisation, through the establishment of the countrywide laic school system), stirrings began of a movement to defend the Corsican language and way of life.

The first group to do so formed in 1896 around the newspaper La Tramontana ('Beyond the Mountains'), but this small group of intellectuals remained a minority within the political landscape of the time. A new generation carried the torch with the foundation of A Cispra newspaper in 1914, which made the first demands for a Corsican political separatism: "Corsica is not a department of France. It is a nation that has been conquered and will rise again."

It was World War I that generated an audience for these previously marginal ideas. Conscription affected agrarian communities more than industrial ones, and the death-toll for France's rural regions was consequently higher than the national average, with Corsica the department with the highest ratio of casualties per capita: the trauma of losing a dozen young men in a small village caused many Corsicans to begin to question the French state. For some this prompted a desire for greater administrative decentralisation within the French Republic (this was the focus of the Estates-General of Corsica, a 1934 conference held in Ajaccio); for a few, it triggered a desire to work towards an independent Corsican state; and for yet others it, along with the perception that neighbouring Italy was being regenerated under a dynamic modern regime, prompted a desire to integrate into Fascist Italy. These different ideas were centred on the Corsican nationalist newspaper A Muvra (The Moufflon). Hostility to the French state grew following military operations on the island in 1930 to root out the popular bandit, Spada.

1923 saw the foundation of the Partitu Corsu d'Azione, under the leadership of Petru Rocca, an Italian irredentist who initially promoted the union of Corsica to the Kingdom of Italy, and Pierre Dominique, a prominent political journalist who soon after joined France's ruling centre-left Radical-Socialist Party. World War Two modified this sentiment, as Italian troops occupied the island: after the war the sentiment evolved in favour of promoting changed to promote Corsican decentralisation, via the new Partitu Corsu Autonomista. Rocca in 1953 demanded from France the acceptance of the Corsican people and language and the creation of the University of Corte.

Corsican nationalism was a minority movement during these decades, and many Corsicans participated in the French state as administrators, soldiers, policemen and several cabinet ministers; indeed during the interwar some of the most prominent political figures within France's countrywide political organizations were Corsicans (see Jean Chiappe, Horace Carbuccia, François Piétri, Cesar Campinchi, Gabriel Péri). However, the work of the smaller intellectual, cultural and political groups formed the prehistory to the modern nationalist movement that would find a mass audience after the political crisis of 1958.

=== Corsica in the 1960s ===
The end of the 1950s saw the high point of Corsica's population and economy. Since the end of the 19th century, Corsica had continued to decrease in population, culminating in a precarious economic situation and a huge delay in the development of industry and infrastructure.

Corsican society was then further affected by three events:

- The first was the collapse of the French Colonial Empire. The Colonial Army and colonial enterprises were the principal form of employment for Corsicans. In 1920, Corsicans made up 20% of colonial administration, despite only making up 1% of Metropolitan France's population. The end of colonialism deprived young Corsicans of the opportunities of their elders and forced many to return to the island. This situation resulted in the emergence of a regionalist movement with the objective of increasing the number of opportunities for the islanders. During the uprisings in Algeria in 1958 and 1961, Corsica was the only French département that joined the insurgent colonists.
- The second shock was the arrival of people returning from the former African colonies, French citizens but not always of Corsican ancestry, to whom the state controversially granted land in the fertile eastern plain. At the beginning of the 1960s, before the arrival of returnees from Algeria, they represented around 10% of the island's population.
- The third involved France's nuclear programme, in the context of the Cold War. In 1960 French leaders Charles de Gaulle and Michel Debré sought to develop a nuclear arms testing site in the abandoned silver mines of Argentella (Balagne). This provoked a significant protest movement across the island, which was successful in convincing the French government to abandon nuclear testing on the site, later carried out in French Polynesia. The episode was key in the development of the nationalist movement: first, in generating a sense of distrust towards the French state; second, in demonstrating what islanders could achieve through campaigning; and third by politicising the new generation who would go on to lead the nationalist movement for the remainder of the twentieth century, notably Edmond Simeoni. For this reason, modern Corsican nationalism has retained strong links to the broader Green movement.

=== Origins of the modern regionalist movement ===
Many Corsicans began to become aware of the demographic decline and economic collapse of the island. The first movement appeared as the Corsican Regional Front, a group largely formed by Corsican emigrants in Paris. This evolved into Corsican Regionalist Action, which demanded that the French state take into account the island's economic difficulties and distinct cultural characteristics, notably linguistic, greatly endangered by the demographic decline and economic difficulty. These movements caused a major revival of the Corsican language, and an increase in work to protect and promote Corsican cultural traditions.

But these movements felt that their demands were being ignored and saw the state's treatment of the returnees as a sign of contempt. They argued against the idea that Corsica was made up of "virgin land" where there is no need to consult the local population on repatriation, and criticised the financial support and aid received by the new arrivals through the Society for Agricultural Development of Corsica (SOMIVAC), which had never been offered to the Corsicans.

=== Aléria incident and birth of the FLNC ===
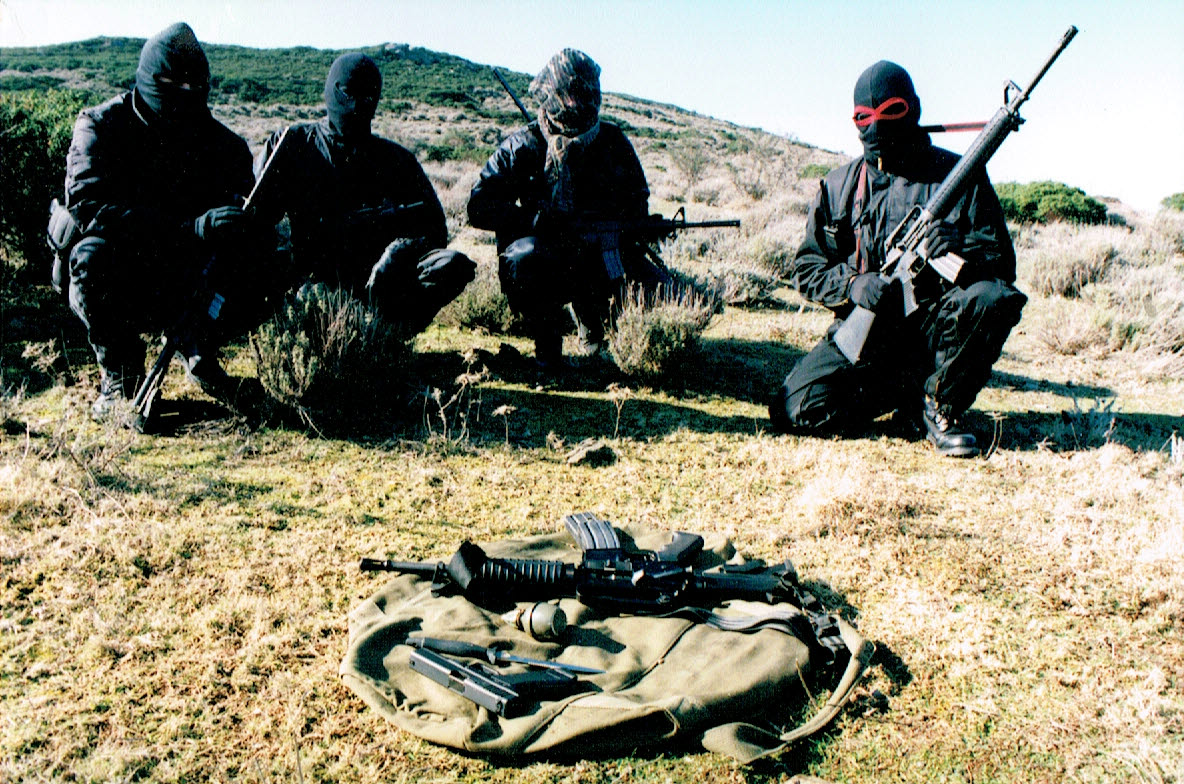
FLNC fighters

In a situation that many considered dire, the group Corsican Regionalist Action (ARC) (fr) decided to choose more radical methods of action.

On 21 August 1975, twenty members of the ARC, led by the group's leader Edmond Simeoni, occupied the Depeille wine cellar, in the eastern plains near Aléria. Equipped with rifles and machine guns, they wanted to bring to public attention the economic situation of the island, particularly that regarding agriculture. They denounced the takeover of lands in the east of the island by "pieds-noirs" and their families. The French Interior Minister at the time, Michel Poniatowski, sent 2,000 CRS and gendarmes backed with light armoured vehicles, and ordered an attack on the 22nd at 4pm. Two gendarmes were killed during the confrontation. A week later the cabinet ordered the dissolution of the ARC. The tension rose rapidly in Bastia and scuffles broke out in the late afternoon, which turned to riots by nightfall that included armed confrontation. One member of the ARC was killed and many were wounded.

On 4 May 1976, some months after the events in Aléria, nationalist militants founded the National Liberation Front of Corsica (FLNC), a joining of the Fronte Paesanu di Liberazone di a Corsica (FPCL), responsible for the bombing of a polluting Italian boat, and Ghjustizia Paolina, reputed to be the armed wing of the ARC. The founding of this new group was marked by a series of bombings in Corsica and in mainland France. A press conference was held in Casabianca, the location of the signing of the Corsican Constitution and where Pasquale Paoli declared Corsican independence in 1755.

== Themes of Corsican nationalism ==
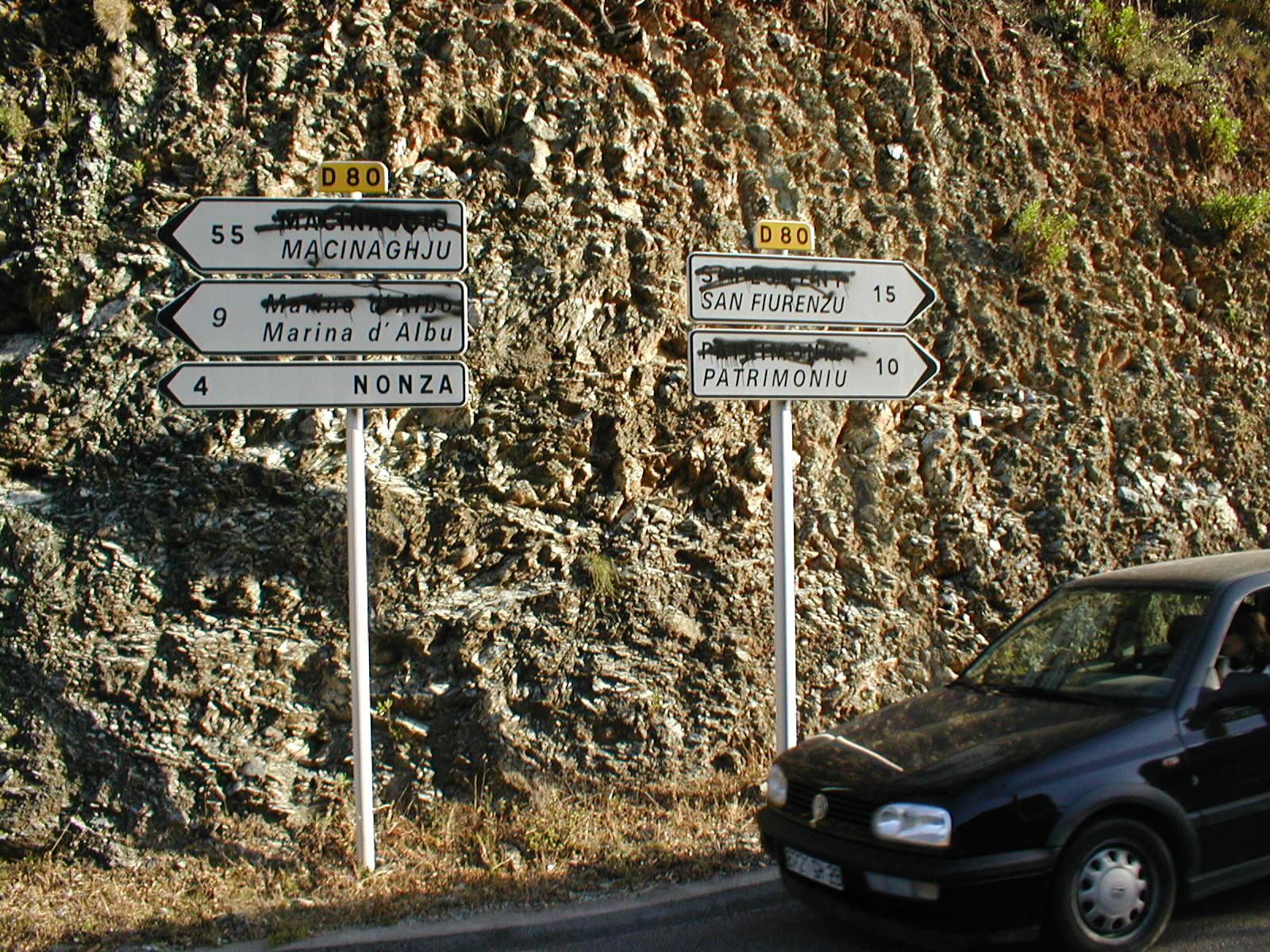
Road signs in Corsica with the French (or Italian) placenames blotted out

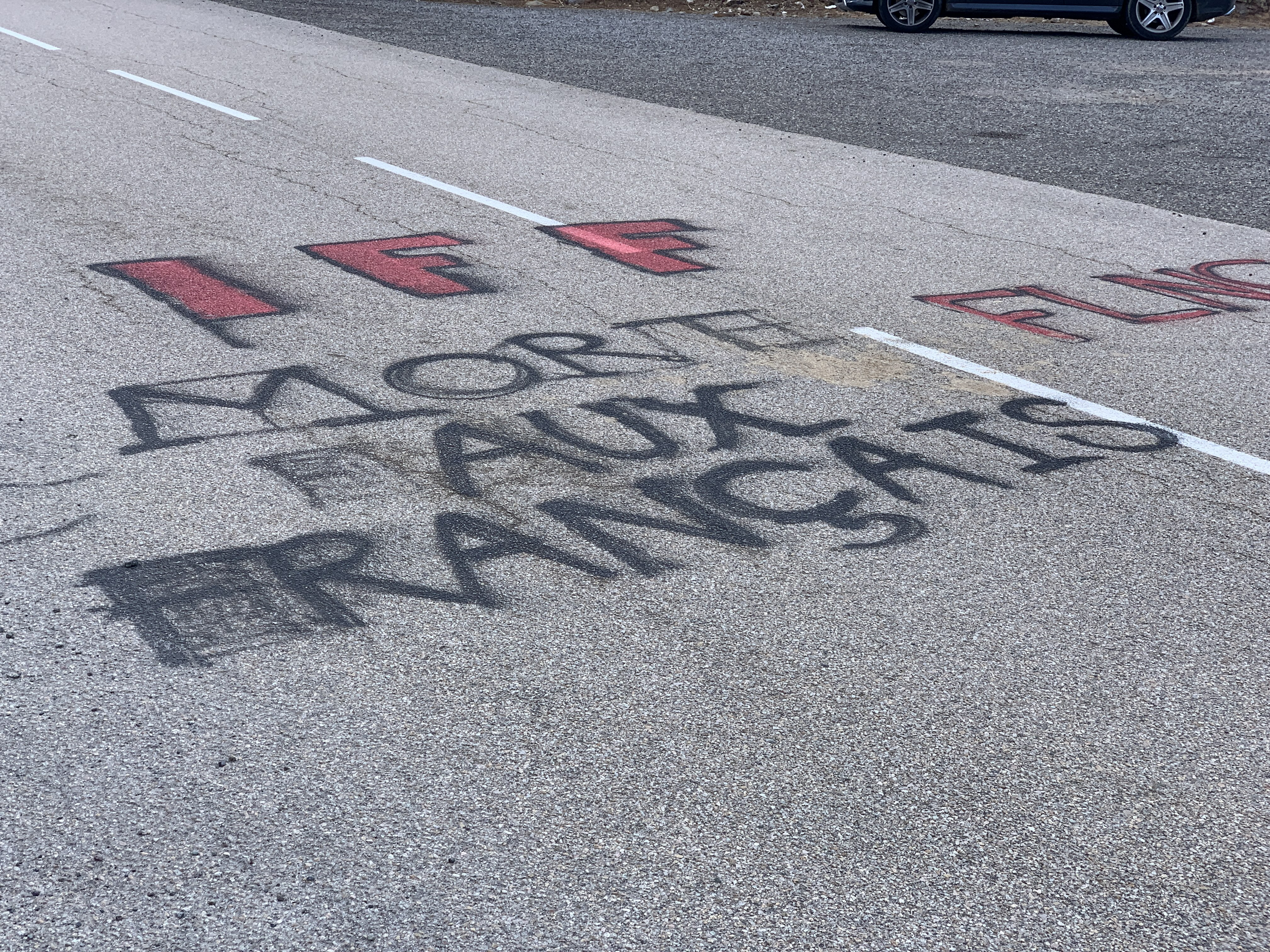
Inscription reading "Death to the French" on the route D81, San-Gavino-di-Tenda, 2021.

- Political sovereignty of Corsica: independence from France or increased autonomy in France. Separation from France is partially based on cultural and ethnic differences between the island and the mainland. The imposition of a revolutionary tax was practised in the 1980s, and continues to be imposed by the FLNC, or people claiming to be associated with it. The bombings against state buildings have been constant: attacks against prefectures, prisons, tax offices, military camps, the assassination of Claude Érignac, etc. But greater in number are the bombings of second homes belonging to foreigners and mainlanders.
- The promotion of the Corsican language, and its compulsory teaching in schools.
- The limiting of tourist infrastructure and policies promoting tourism, and in its place another way to boost economic development.
- Compliance with building permits.
- Compliance with coastal law.
- Recognition of political prisoner status for imprisoned members of the FLNC, including those who have been convicted for common-law violations.

=== Corsican nationalism and international investment ===
The Corsican coast is less developed than mainland France's Mediterranean coast, due in part to bombings attributed to the nationalist movement against a number of second homes belonging to non-natives.

U Rinnovu, a Corsican nationalist movement commonly referred to as being close to a splinter group of the FLNC known as "of 22nd October", describes the construction of second homes for the benefit of non-residents as "heresy" and "against economic sense". The slogan Vergogna à tè chì vendi a tò terra ("Shame on you who sell your land") is also the title of a song and nationalist anthem.

At the Matignon process under the Jospin government, Article 12 of the Matignon Accords provided for an adjustment of the coastal law making it easier to issue building permits on the Corsican coast. On the day of the discussion of this article in the Corsican Assembly, activists from the organisation A Manca Naziunale surrounded the villa of André Tarallo of the French petroleum company Elf Aquitaine in Piantaredda, against the granting of contested building permits. The article was subsequently rejected.

== Politics ==
The main separatist party, Corsica Libera, achieved 9.85% of votes in the 2010 French regional elections. However, only 19% and 42% of those who voted respectively for Gilles Simeoni's autonomist list Femu a Corsica and Jean-Guy Talamoni's separatist Corsica Libera were, according to polling, in favour of independence. By 2012, polls showed support for independence at 10-15%, while support for increased devolution within France was as high as 51% (of which two-thirds would prefer "slightly more" rather than "much more" autonomy). Among the general French population, 30% of respondents expressed a favourable view on Corsican independence. In what was viewed as a "setback" for Nicolas Sarkozy's decentralisation programme, the government's proposal for increased autonomy for Corsica was turned down in a referendum in 2003 by a result of 51% negative and 49% affirmative votes expressed by the local electorate.

In 2015, Simeoni's pro-autonomy coalition Pè a Corsica won for the first time ever in the French regional elections, getting 35.34% of the vote and 24 out of 51 seats in the Corsican Assembly.

In the 2017 elections for the Corsican Assembly, their majority was reinforced, Pè a Corsica got 56.46% of the votes and 41 seats.

In 2017, in the legislative elections, three nationalists from Pè a Corsica were elected to the French National Assembly, out of the four members elected in Corsica: Paul-André Colombani in Southern Corsica, Michel Castellani and Jean-Félix Acquaviva in Upper Corsica.

== Notable people and parties ==
Parties

- Corsica Libera (political party)
- Pè a Corsica (political party, defunct)
- FLNC (militant group)
- Party of the Corsican Nation (political party)
- A Cuncolta Naziunalista (political party, defunct)

People

- Leo Battesti (b. 1953)
- Yvan Colonna (1960–2022), notable member of the National Liberation Front of Corsica.
- Gilbert Casanova, founder of the Movement for Self-determination (MPA) and ex-president of the Corse-du-Sud Chamber of Commerce, imprisoned in 2008 for drug trafficking.
- Edmond Simeoni (1934–2018), considered the father of modern Corsican regionalism and nationalism.
- Gilles Simeoni (b. 1967), son of the former and the first president of the Corsican regional executive council (regional government).
- Pasquale Paoli (1725–1807), leader of the Corsican Republic (1755–1769), considered the father of the Corsican nation.
- Napoleon Bonaparte (1769–1821), French military leader and statesman whose family had been passionate Corsican nationalists, as he was in his younger years.

== See also ==
- Sardinian nationalism
- Occitan nationalism
- Breton nationalism
- Reunification of Brittany

== Bibliography ==
- Jean-Louis Andreani, Comprendre la Corse, Gallimard, 2005
- Daniel Arnaud, La Corse et l'idée républicaine, L'Harmattan, 2006
- Emmanuel Barnabeu Casanova, Le nationalisme corse : genèse, succès et échec, L'Harmattan
- Ange-Laurent Bindi, Autonomisme. Luttes d'émancipation en Corse et ailleurs 1984-1989, L'Harmattan
- Gabriel Xavier Culioli, Le complexe corse, Gallimard
- Marc de Cursay, "Corse : la fin des mythes", L'Harmattan
- Pascal Irastorza, Le guêpier corse, Fayard, 1999
- Marianne Lefèvre, Géopolitique de la Corse. Le modèle républicain en question, L'Harmattan
- Jean-Michel Rossi / François Santoni, Pour solde de tout compte, les nationalistes corses parlent, Denoël
- Pierre Poggioli, Journal de bord d'un nationaliste corse, Éditions de l'Aube, 1996
- Pierre Poggioli, Corse : chroniques d'une île déchirée 1996-1999, L'Harmattan, 1999
- Pierre Poggioli, Derrière les cagoules : le FLNC des années 80, DCL Editions
- Edmond Simeoni, Corse, la volonté d'être. Vingt ans après Aléria, Albiana
- Bonardi Fabrice, Corse, la croisée des chemins, L'Harmattan, 1989
