= Femu a Corsica =

Let's Do Corsica Femu a Corsica
- Leader: Gilles Simeoni
- Secretary-General: Jean-Félix Acquaviva
- Founded: January 2010 (as a coalition); 15 October 2017 (as a party)
- Merger of: Inseme per a Corsica; Chjama Naziunale; Politics and Democracy in Motion; Party of the Corsican Nation (2010–2019); Pè a Corsica
- Headquarters: Bastia, Corsica
- Ideology: Corsican nationalism Corsican autonomism Humanism
- Political position: Centre
- National affiliation: Régions et Peuples Solidaires; Pè a Corsica (2015–2021)
- European affiliation: European Free Alliance
- Colours: Orange
- National Assembly: 2 / 577
- Senate: 0 / 348
- European Parliament: 0 / 81
- Corsican Assembly: 32 / 63

Website
- femuacorsica.corsica

Femu a Corsica (Corsican pronunciation: [ˈfɛmu a ˈkorsiɡa]; lit. 'Let's Do Corsica' or 'Let us make Corsica') is a Corsican autonomist political party. It was formed for the first time prior to the 2010 French regional elections in the form of a political coalition. The coalition members, Inseme per a Corsica, the Party of the Corsican Nation (PNC) and Chjama Naziunale, merged during the founding congress of the party in Corte on 15 October 2017. The PUDEMU (Pulitica è Demucrazia in Muvimentu) movement also merged into the new party. The PNC was later re-established in 2019. The leader of the party is Gilles Simeoni.

Following the victory of the Pè a Corsica list in the territorial elections of 2017, of which Femu a Corsica was a member alongside Corsica Libera, the party won 28 of the 63 seats in the Corsican Assembly. Gilles Simeoni was reappointed as President of the Executive Council of Corsica, which he has held since 2015. The party won 32 seats in the 2021 elections after the Pè a Corsica coalition split up.
