= Gilles Simeoni =

French jurist, politician and lawyer

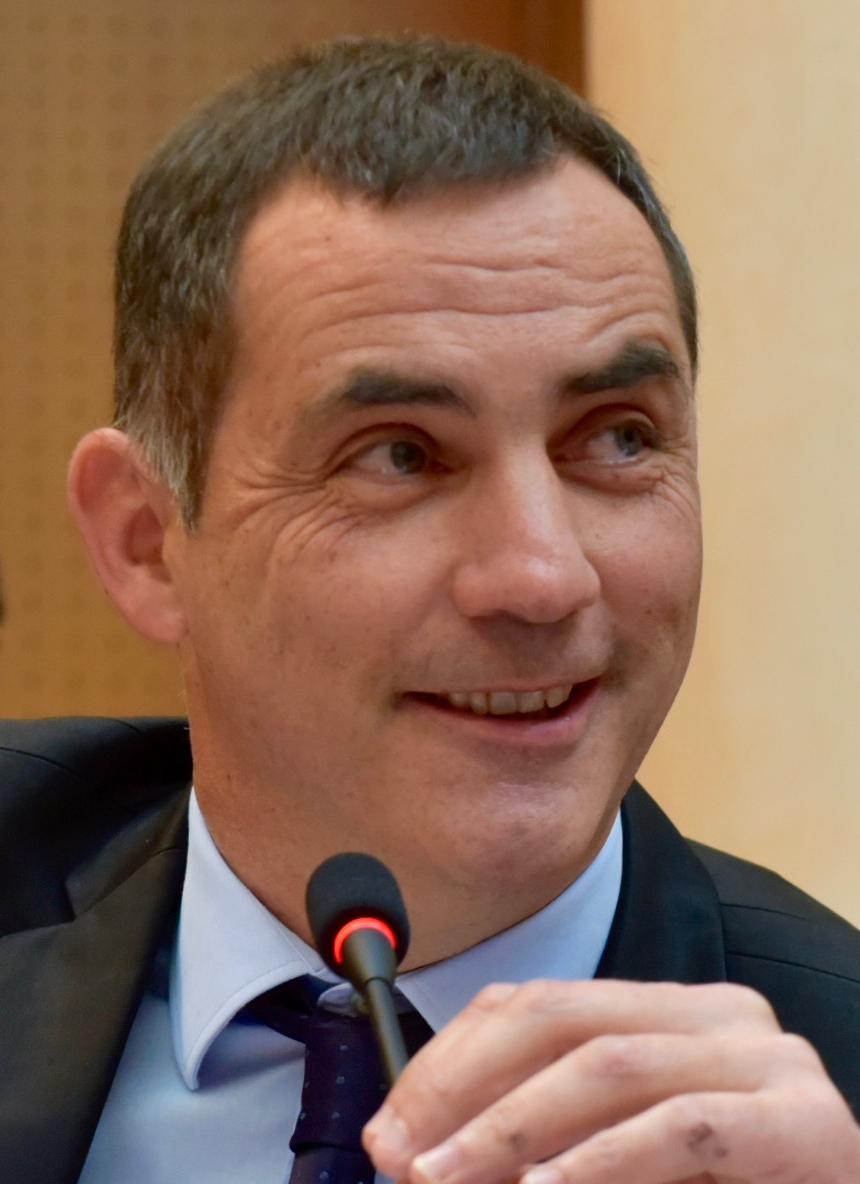
- Gilles Simeoni in 2016

President of the Executive Council of Corsica
- In office 17 December 2015 – 21 April 2026
- Preceded by: Paul Giacobbi
- Succeeded by: Bianca Fazi (acting); Gilles Giovannangeli

Mayor of Bastia
- Incumbent
- Assumed office 28 March 2026
- Preceded by: Pierre Savelli
- In office 5 April 2014 – 7 January 2016
- Preceded by: Émile Zuccarelli
- Succeeded by: Pierre Savelli

Personal details
- Born: 20 April 1967 (age 59) Bastia, Corsica, France
- Party: Femu a Corsica
- Parent: Edmond Simeoni (father)
- Education: University of Corsica Pasquale Paoli
- Profession: Lawyer

Gilles Simeoni (French pronunciation: [ʒil simeɔni], Corsican: [simɛˈɔni]; born 20 April 1967) is a lawyer and politician from Corsica, France serving as Mayor of Bastia since 2026. He was previously mayor of Bastia from 2014 to 2016 and served as president of the executive council of Corsica from 2015 until his resignation in 2026. Notably, Simeoni served as the Corsican nationalist Yvan Colonna's lawyer at his trial for the assassination of Claude Érignac.

== Early life and education ==
He is the son of Edmond Simeoni and the nephew of Max Simeoni.

He has a masters in law and a doctorate in political science specializing in Mediterranean Politics in the European Union which he received after his studies at the university of Corsica and Aix-en-Provence.

== Legal career ==
He began practicing law on 27 October 1994 and was one of the best known criminal lawyers in Corsica.

He was one of Yvan Colonna's lawyers at his trial for the assassination of Claude Érignac and in 2010 he was listed as one of the thirty most powerful lawyers in France by the magazine GQ6.

After becoming mayor of his home town of Bastia in 2014 he decided to stop practicing law.

== Political career ==
=== Early years ===
He was first politically active when he was at university, having been an active member of his student union. The beginning of his political career came in 2001 when Simeoni and the A Mossa Naziunale movement, which he led at that time, supported Marie-Jean Vinciguerra during the Bastia municipal elections.

In 2003 he did work with the Ligue des droits de l'homme.

In 2007 Gilles Simeoni ran to represent Haute-Corse's 2nd constituency. Lozzi, the town that Simeoni's family originally came from, is within this electoral district. In the first round he received just 13.5% of votes (third place) and did not pass on to the second round. Despite this he would later go on to describe this campaign as a tipping point in his life.

=== 2008 municipal elections ===
A year later, Gilles Simeoni placed second in the first round of the 2008 Bastia municipal elections, having received 14.91% of the vote. This was 5 points more than predicted by voter intention surveys and allowed him to proceed to the second round. In the second round he received 25% of the vote which allowed him to become the leader of the opposition in the municipal council of Bastia.

=== 2010 regional elections and Member of the Corsican Assembly ===
In the 2010 regional elections, Simeoni and Jean-Christophe Angelini fr were at the top of the nationalist Femu a Corsica party list. The party received 18.4% of the vote in the first round and 25.89% in the second round which won them 11 seats in the Corsican Assembly. Because the Radical Party of the Left led by Paul Giacobbi did not have enough seats for an absolute majority, they needed at least some votes from other parties. However, there were deep ideological divisions between the leftists and the nationalists and republicans which prevented most legislation from moving through the Assembly. This did not prevent Giacobbi from bringing issues important to his party to the Assembly floor. This led to the development of a budding rivalry between Simeoni and Giacobbi. Notably Simeoni rebuked Giacobbi calling his behavior in the Assembly a form of electoral clientelism and compared him to the Roman god Janus implying that his governing style was ambivalent.

=== 2012 legislative elections ===
In the 2012 legislative elections Gilles Simeoni ran to represent Haute-Corse's 1st constituency which contains Bastia and Cap Corse. His primary goal was to gain support for his party ahead of the 2014 municipal elections. Within his district he outperformed predictions by coming in second to the Union for a Popular Movement's Sauveur Gandolfi-Scheit ahead of the Radical Party of the Left's Jean Zuccarelli. On a municipal level, Simeoni's party received around a thousand more votes than they had during the 2010 elections while the Radical Party of the Left saw a decline of around 250. This was a confirmation of the narrowing gap between the two parties and gave credence to the thought of an eventual victory for Simeoni and Pe a Corsica in the 2014 municipal elections.

=== 2014 municipal elections and Mayor of Bastia ===
In the first round of the March 2014 municipal elections Simeoni's party received 32.32% of the vote. In the second round he picked up votes from the Union for a Popular Movement's Jean-Louis Milani and the Radical Party of the Left's François Tatti, leaving him with 55.40% of the total. The next month on the fifth of April he became the first nationalist mayor of Bastia, ending the dual reign of French Communist Party and the Radical Party of the Left who had been in control of the town since 1968. This outcome was the result of the nationalist's new electoral strategy that Gilles Simeoni had helped to design. This strategy privileged pragmatic alliances so that they could bring their ideas closer to the center of Corsican politics.

=== 2015 municipal elections ===
During the March 2015 departmental elections, the municipal alliance of Bastia ran pairs of candidates in the four cantons totally or partially within the City of Bastia. They had success in three out of four cantons which further proved that Simeoni's strategy was working. However his ally Fraçois Tatti was seen celebrating the victory of François Orlandi an ally of Paul Giacobbi.

Tatti's actions led Simeoni, Jean-Louis Milani and Emanuelle de Gentili (who was Tatti's former running mate) to call for his resignation. This signaled the beginning of the campaign for the 2015 Regional Elections in which the nationalists hoped to confront Giacobbi.

=== 2017 Corsican territorial election ===
Following the 2017 territorial elections, Pè a Corsica confirmed and strengthened its majority in the Corsican Assembly. The party came out on top with 56.46% of the votes cast in the second round, counting 41 seats. It was elected to the Corsican executive council on 2 January 2018.

On 2 January 2018, his list was re-elected to the Executive Council of Corsica, obtaining 42 votes out of 63, while the Pè a Corsica majority was 41.

=== 2021 Regional Elections ===
The 2021 regional elections saw a clear victory for Gille Simeoni and his list Fà popolu Inseme despite internal divisions within the nationalist front which, a few weeks before the vote, led to the end of the Pè a Corsica coalition. After obtaining 29.10% in the first round, the incumbent president managed to defeat the right-wing candidate Laurent Marcangeli with 40.64% of the vote, winning 32 seats out of 63 available.

=== Resignation as president and second term as mayor of Bastia ===
Simeoni was re-elected mayor of Bastia in the 2026 municipal elections. As a result, choosing to focus on his position in Bastia, Simeoni resigned as president of the Corsican executive one month later, on 21 April 2026. He was succeeded by acting president Bianca Fazi until the election of Gilles Giovannangeli on 4 May 2026.

== Personal life ==
He has three children and describes himself as a non-practicing Catholic.

Political offices
Preceded by Émile Zuccarelli	Mayor of Bastia; 2014–2016	Succeeded by Pierre Savelli
