= Paul Giacobbi =

French politician

Paul Giacobbi (born 4 June 1957 in Courbevoie, Hauts-de-Seine) was a member of the National Assembly of France until he retired at the 2017 Parliamentary Elections. He represented the 2nd constituency of the Haute-Corse department, and is a member of the Radical Party of the Left.
