= Corsican Assembly =

Unicameral legislative body of Corsica

Corsican Assembly Assemblea di Corsica L'Assemblée de Corse

Type
- Type: Unicameral

History
- Founded: 2 March 1982

Leadership
- President of the Assembly: Marie-Antoinette Maupertuis, Femu a Corsica since 1 July 2021

Structure
- Seats: 63
- Political groups: Government (32) Femu a Corsica (32) Opposition (31) Bonapartist Central Committee – The Republicans (17) Party of the Corsican Nation – Corsica Libera (8) Rinnovu (6)

Elections
- Last election: June 2021

Meeting place
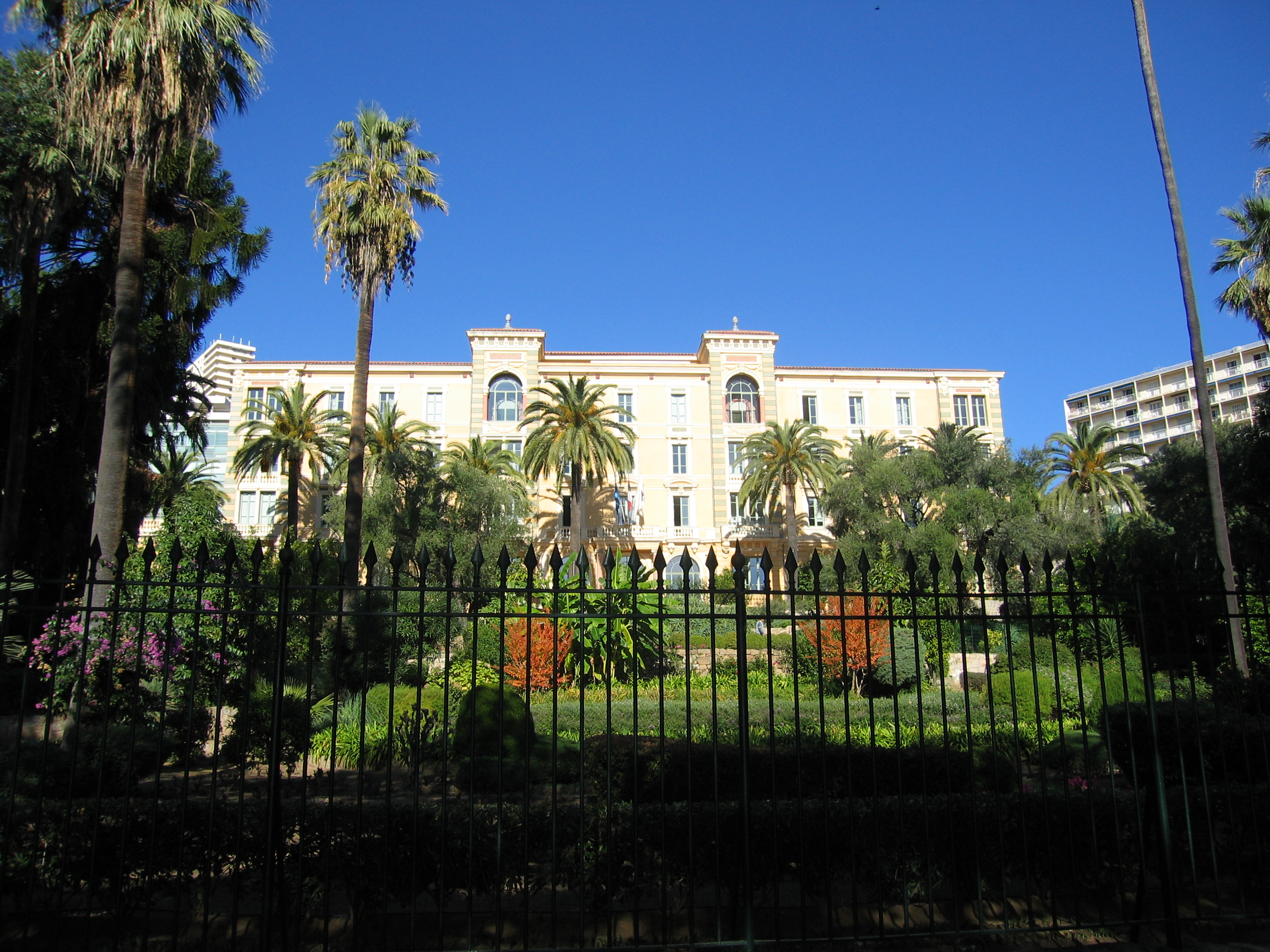
- Grand Hôtel d'Ajaccio et Continental, Ajaccio

Website
- www.isula.corsica/assemblea/

The Corsican Assembly or Assembly of Corsica (Corsican: Assemblea di Corsica; French: Assemblée de Corse) is the unicameral legislative body of the territorial collectivity of Corsica. It has its seat at the Grand Hôtel d'Ajaccio et Continental, in the Corsican capital of Ajaccio. After the 2017 territorial elections, the assembly was expanded from 51 to 63 seats, with the executive council expanding from 9 to 11 members (including the president).

== History ==
Before 1975, Corsica was a department of the French region of Provence-Alpes-Côte d'Azur.

On 2 March 1982, a law was passed that gave Corsica the status of territorial collectivity (collectivité territoriale), abolishing the Corsican Regional Council which had existed before. Unlike the regional councils, the Corsican Assembly has executive powers over the island.

In 1992, three institutions were formed in the territorial collectivity of Corsica:

- The Executive Council of Corsica, which exercises greater executive functions than the Presidents of the Regional Councils exercise in mainland French regions. It ensures the stability and consistency needed to manage the affairs of the territory;
- The Corsican Assembly, a deliberative, unicameral legislative body with greater powers than the regional councils on the mainland;
- The Economic, Social and Cultural Council of Corsica, an advisory body.

== Terminology ==
Members of the Corsican Assembly were first called "territorial councillors" in reference to Corsica's status as a collectivité territoriale. Members are now called "Councillors of the Corsican Assembly", or in unofficial and everyday speech, just "Councillors".

== Powers ==
- Economic development
- Taxation
- Energy
- Environment
- Housing
- Education and training
- Language
- Transport
- Forestry and agriculture
- Culture
- Tourism
- Sports & youth

== Composition ==
There are 63 councillors of the Assembly elected in six-year terms in a two-round voting system. In round one, if a party receives an absolute majority, an eleven-seat bonus is awarded to the winning party. The rest of the seats are distributed proportionally. If no seat wins an absolute majority, then 52 seats are distributed proportionally. A second round of voting is then conducted, in which the winning party or list is awarded the eleven-seat bonus.

At the first meeting of Assembly Councillors after an election, the councillors elect an Assembly President in a plurality ballot. This is also a two-round contest, with an absolute majority required to proceed to the second round. At the same time as the election of the President, the Assembly also elects the ten members that will make up the President's Committee (bureau).

In contrast to the executives of the regional councils, Assembly Councillors may not also be members of the Corsican Executive Council. Election to the executive requires resignation from the Assembly.

== Results ==
2021 Territorial elections in Corsica
| Candidate | List | First round | | Second round | | Seats | +/- |
| Candidate | List | Votes | % | Votes | % | Seats | +/- |
|---|---|---|---|---|---|---|---|
| Gilles Simeoni * | FC | 39,247 | 29.19 | 55,548 | 40.64 | 32 | +14 |
| Laurent Marcangeli | CCB-LR-UDI | 33,432 | 24.86 | 43,769 | 32.02 | 17 | +1 |
| Jean-Christophe Angelini | PNC | 17,772 | 13.22 | 20,604 | 15.07 | 8 | -15 |
| Jean-Guy Talamoni * | CL | 9,280 | 6.90 | 20,604 | 15.07 | 8 | -15 |
| Paul-Félix Benedetti | Rinnovu | 11,282 | 8.39 | 16,762 | 12.26 | 6 | +6 |
| Jean-Charles Orsucci | TdP-LREM | 7,957 | 5.92 | | | 0 | -6 |
| François Filoni | RN | 5,378 | 4.00 | | | 0 | |
| Agnès Simonpietri | EÉLV-G.s-GÉ | 5,039 | 3.75 | | | 0 | |
| Michel Stefani | PCF | 4,279 | 3.18 | | | 0 | |
| Jean-Antoine Giacomi | EXD | 791 | 0.59 | | | 0 | |
| Valid votes | | 134,457 | 98.22 | 136,683 | 96.79 | | |
| Blank ballots | | 1,144 | 0.84 | 2,334 | 1.65 | | |
| Null Ballots | | 1,286 | 0.94 | 2,206 | 1.56 | | |
| Turnout | | 136,887 | 57.08 | 141,223 | 58.91 | 63 | Steady |
| Abstentions | | 102,921 | 42.92 | 98,495 | 41.09 | | |
| Registered voters | | 239,808 | 100 | 239,718 | 100 | | |

=== Presidents of the Corsican Assembly ===
- 1974–1979: François Giacobbi
- 1979–1982: Jean Filippi
- 1982–1984: Prosper Alfonsi
- 1984–1998: Jean-Paul de Rocca Serra
- 1998–2004: José Rossi
- 2004–2010: Camille de Rocca Serra
- 2010–2015: Dominique Bucchini
- 2015-2021: Jean-Guy Talamoni
- 2021-: Marie-Antoinette Maupertuis

=== Assembly members ===
Members since 2015:

== See also ==
- Departmental Council of Corsica
- 2021 French regional elections
