= Corsica Libera =

Left-wing Corsican nationalist political party

Free Corsica Corsica Libera
- Leader: Jean-Guy Talamoni
- Founded: 1 February 2009
- Headquarters: 1, Rue Miot; 20297 Bastia
- Ideology: Corsican independence Separatism; Left-wing nationalism
- Political position: Left-wing
- Colours: Orange; Red; Black; White
- Corsican Assembly: 1 / 63

Website
- corsicalibera.corsica

Corsica Libera (pronounced [ˈkorsiɡa ˈlibɛra], English: Free Corsica) is a left-wing separatist political party active in Corsica. It was founded in Corte in February 2009 by members of three nationalist parties, Corsica Nazione, Rinnovu and the Corsican Nationalist Alliance.

U Rinnovu left Corsica Libera in 2012 and participated to local and regional elections on its own list. In 2017, U Rinnovu became Core in Fronte. The political party led by Paul-Félix Benedetti won 6 seats at the Corsican assembly elections of 2021.

Corsica Libera advocates full independence for Corsica and it does not condemn the violent actions by groups such as the National Liberation Front of Corsica. The party distinguished itself with its symbolic occupation of Christian Clavier's Corsican residence. The party has one seat in the Corsican Assembly and a number of local councillors, including the mayor of the small village Granace.

The party's candidate in the 2010 territorial elections, Jean-Guy Talamoni, won 9.36% of the vote and qualified for the runoff. In the first round of the 2015 French regional elections, Corsica Libera received 7.73% of the vote.

On 28 January 2024, Corsica Libera merged with the collective of political prisoners Patriottu to found a new political movement, Nazione, that is less focused on electoral issues and more on long-scale changement using for instance diplomacy through the UN, with the support of the FLNC and the STC (Syndicat des Travailleurs Corses). At the Ghjurnate organized by Nazione in August 2024, the FLNC came to read a statement in support of Nazione. There was also a speech of the Unione di a Ghjuventu in Lotta (the coalition of 4 youth movements: Ghjuventu Paolina founded in 1992, Ghjuventu Independentista founded in 1998, Ghjuventu Libera founded in 2009 as the youth branch of Corsica Libera and Ghjuventu in Core founded in 2017 as the youth branch of the rival independentist party, Core in Fronte).
