= Opinion polling for the 2021 French regional elections =

This page lists public opinion polls conducted for the 2021 French regional elections, which were held in two rounds on 20 and 27 June 2021.

Unless otherwise noted, all polls listed below are compliant with the regulations of the national polling commission (Commission nationale des sondages) and utilize the quota method.

== National ==
=== First round ===
Polling firm	Fieldwork date	Sample	Abs.	LO	LFI	EELV	PS–PCF	LREM–MoDem	LR–SL–LC	DLF	RN–LDP	Others
2021 election	20 Jun	–		2.8%	0.8%	7.4%	13.2%	10.5%	29.5%	1.3%	18.7%	0.6%
OpinionWay	9–14 Jun	5,030	–	2%	6%	12%	12%	12%	28%	1%	25%	2%
OpinionWay	19–25 May	5,017	–	2%	6%	12%	11%	13%	27%	1%	26%	2%
OpinionWay	22–28 Apr	5,000	–	2%	6%	12%	13%	15%	24%	2%	22%	4%
OpinionWay	17–22 Mar	5,049	–	2%	7%	13%	12%	16%	23%	3%	21%	3%
OpinionWay	17–22 Feb	5,017	–	1%	7%	12%	13%	17%	23%	3%	20%	4%
OpinionWay	22–26 Jan	5,073	–	1%	7%	12%	12%	18%	22%	3%	22%	3%
2015 election	20 Dec	–				6.63%	35.96%		26.65%	3.81%	27.73%	

== Auvergne-Rhône-Alpes ==
=== First round ===
Polling firm	Fieldwork date	Sample	Abs.	Gomez LO	Cukierman PCF–LFI	Grébert EELV	Belkacem PS	Omeir UDMF	Bonnell MR–LREM	Wauquiez LR	Kotarac RN	Gill DIV
2021 election	20 Jun	—		1.6%	5.6%	14.5%	11.4%	0.3%	9.8%	43.9%	12.3%	0.7%
OpinionWay	11–13 Jun	1,000	—	1%	6%	11%	10%	0%	15%	35%	22%	0%
OpinionWay	4–7 Jun	1,019	—	1%	7%	13%	10%	0.5%	14%	33%	22%	0.5%
Ipsos	3–7 Jun	1,000	—	2%	5%	11%	12%	0.5%	14%	33%	22%	0.5%
Ifop	1–4 Jun	992	—	1.5%	6%	11%	11%	0.5%	13%	35%	22%	0%
OpinionWay	28–30 May	1,068	—	2%	6%	12%	9%	1%	14%	34%	22%	0%

=== Second round ===
Polling firm	Fieldwork date	Sample	Abs.	Grébert EELV–PS–PCF–LFI	Belkacem PS–EELV–PCF–LFI	Bonnell MR–LREM	Wauquiez LR	Kotarac RN
2021 election	27 Jun	—		33.6%	—	—	55.2%	11.2%
OpinionWay	22–23 Jun	1,017	—	29%	—	—	58%	13%
OpinionWay	11–13 Jun	1,000	—	—	23%	16%	39%	22%
OpinionWay	11–13 Jun	1,000	—	22%	—	16%	40%	22%
OpinionWay	4–7 Jun	1,019	—	24%	—	15%	38%	23%
Ipsos	3–7 Jun	1,000	—	—	24%	16%	37%	23%
Ifop	1–4 Jun	992	—	26%	—	15%	37%	22%
Ifop	1–4 Jun	992	—	30%	—	—	47%	23%
OpinionWay	28–30 May	1,068	—	23%	—	15%	38%	24%

== Bourgogne-Franche-Comté ==
=== First round ===
Polling firm	Fieldwork date	Sample	Abs.	Rocher LO	Faudot GRS–LFI	Modde EELV	Dufay PS–PCF	Thuriot LREM–MoDem	Platret LR–DLF	Odoul RN
2021 election	20 Jun	—		2.7%	4.5%	10.3%	26.5%	11.7%	21.0%	23.2%
Ifop	? Jun	994	—	1%	5%	10%	18%	15%	21%	30%
Ipsos	3–7 Jun	1,000	—	2%	4%	8%	21%	16%	21%	28%
OpinionWay	27–31 May	1,112	—	1%	7%	9%	19%	14%	20%	30%

=== Second round ===
Polling firm	Fieldwork date	Sample	Abs.	Dufay PS–PCF	Thuriot LREM–MoDem	Platret LR–DLF	Odoul RN
2021 election	27 Jun	—		42.2%	9.8%	24.2%	23.8%
Ifop	? Jun	994	—	27%	17%	24%	32%
Ifop	? Jun	994	—	35%	—	33%	32%
Ipsos	3–7 Jun	1,000	—	32%	18%	21%	29%
OpinionWay	27–31 May	1,112	—	30%	15%	23%	32%
OpinionWay	27–31 May	1,112	—	38%	—	28%	34%

== Brittany ==
=== First round ===
Polling firm	Fieldwork date	Sample	Abs.	Hamon LO	Cadalen LFI	Desmares-Poirrier EELV–UDB	Cueff BMV	Chesnais-Girard PS–PCF	Elahiar UDMF	Martin PB	Burlot LREM–MoDem	Le Callennec LR	Cabas DLF	Pennelle RN	Chauvel EXD	Daviet DIV
2021 election	20 Jun	—		2.3%	5.6%	14.8%	6.5%	21.0%	0.1%	1.6%	15.5%	16.3%	1.4%	14.3%	0.2%	0.5%
Ipsos	3–7 Jun	1,000	—	2%	5%	12%	4%	19%	0.5%	0.5%	19%	14%	3%	20%	0.5%	0.5%

=== Second round ===
Polling firm	Fieldwork date	Sample	Abs.	Desmares-Poirrier EELV–UDB	Chesnais-Girard PS–PCF–BMV	Burlot LREM–MoDem	Le Callennec LR	Pennelle RN
2021 election	27 Jun	—		20.2%	29.8%	14.8%	22.0%	13.2%
Ipsos	3–7 Jun	1,000	—	—	39%	21%	16%	24%
Ipsos	3–7 Jun	1,000	—	21%	29%	—	24%	26%
Ipsos	3–7 Jun	1,000	—	26%	—	26%	22%	26%

== Centre-Val de Loire ==
=== First round ===
Polling firm	Fieldwork date	Sample	Abs.	Megdoud LO	Fournier EELV–LFI	Clément DEL	Bonneau PS–PCF	Fesneau MoDem–LREM	Forissier LR	Nikolic RN
2021 election	20 Jun	—		2.6%	10.9%	4.0%	39.2%	16.7%	18.8%	22.2%
Ipsos	3–7 Jun	1,000	—	2%	9%	3%	21%	19%	18%	28%
Ipsos	12–15 May	1,000	—	2%	11%	3%	19%	21%	16%	28%

=== Second round ===
Polling firm	Fieldwork date	Sample	Abs.	Fournier EELV–PS–PCF–LFI	Bonneau PS–EELV–PCF–LFI	Fesneau MoDem–LREM	Forissier LR	Nikolic RN
2021 election	27 Jun	—		—	39.2%	16.0%	22.6%	22.2%
Ipsos	3–7 Jun	1,000	—	—	30%	22%	18%	30%
Ipsos	3–7 Jun	1,000	—	—	35%	—	33%	32%
Ipsos	3–7 Jun	1,000	—	—	34%	33%	—	33%
Ipsos	12–15 May	1,000	—	—	29%	25%	16%	30%
Ipsos	12–15 May	1,000	—	28%	—	25%	17%	30%

== Corsica ==
=== First round ===
Polling firm	Fieldwork date	Sample	Abs.	Stefani PCF	Simonpietri EELV	Talamoni CL	Benedetti Rinnovu	Angelini PNC	Simeoni FaC	Orsucci TdP–LREM	Marcangeli A!–LR–CCB	Filoni RN	Giacomi EXD
2021 election	20 Jun	—		3.2%	3.8%	6.9%	8.4%	13.2%	29.2%	5.9%	24.9%	4.0%	0.6%
Ipsos	2–5 Jun	800	—	5%	8%	7%	7%	11%	25%	9%	23%	4%	1%

== Grand Est ==
=== First round ===
Polling firm	Fieldwork date	Sample	Abs.	Fève LO	Filippetti G.s–LFI	Romani EELV–PS–PCF	Tyane UDMF	Meyer UL	Klinkert LREM–MoDem	Rottner LR	Jacobelli RN	Philippot LP
2021 election	20 Jun	—										
Ipsos	3–7 Jun	1,000	—	2%	5%	14%	1%	4%	14%	27%	25%	8%
OpinionWay	25–31 May	2,010	—	1%	7%	14%	1%	2%	16%	28%	25%	6%

=== Second round ===
Polling firm	Fieldwork date	Sample	Abs.	Romani EELV–PS–PCF–G.s–LFI	Klinkert LREM–MoDem	Rottner LR	Jacobelli RN
2021 election	20 Jun	—					
Ipsos	3–7 Jun	1,000	—	20%	19%	29%	32%
OpinionWay	25–31 May	2,010	—	20%	19%	31%	30%
OpinionWay	25–31 May	2,010	—	24%	—	45%	31%
OpinionWay	25–31 May	2,010	—	—	24%	39%	37%

== Hauts-de-France ==
=== First round ===
Polling firm	Fieldwork date	Sample	Abs.	Pecqueur LO	Delli EELV–PS–PCF–LFI	Alexandre PACE	Pietraszewski LREM–MoDem	Bertrand LR	Evrard DLF	Chenu RN–CNIP
2021 election	20 Jun	–								
Elabe	4–7 Jun	1,107	–	2%	17%	0%	11%	35%	3%	32%
Ifop	2–7 Jun	967	–	1%	20%	1%	10%	34%	2%	32%
OpinionWay	2–5 Jun	1,010	–	2%	17%	1%	12%	34%	3%	31%
BVA	26–31 May	794	–	3%	22%	1%	13%	30%	3%	28%
Ipsos	27–29 May	1,000	–	2%	17%	1%	10%	36%	2%	32%
OpinionWay	26–29 May	1,048	–	1%	17%	2%	11%	33%	4%	32%
Harris Interactive	20–24 May	1,218	–	2%	19%	1%	11%	35%	2%	30%

=== Second round ===
Polling firm	Fieldwork date	Sample	Abs.	Delli EELV–PS–PCF–LFI	Pietraszewski LREM–MoDem	Bertrand LR	Chenu RN–CNIP
2021 election	27 Jun	–					
Elabe	4–7 Jun	1,107	–	18%	11%	37%	34%
Elabe	4–7 Jun	1,107	–	19%	—	46%	35%
Ifop	2–7 Jun	967	–	19%	11%	35%	35%
Ifop	2–7 Jun	967	–	22%	—	43%	35%
OpinionWay	2–5 Jun	1,010	–	17%	12%	37%	34%
OpinionWay	2–5 Jun	1,010	–	19%	—	47%	34%
BVA	26-31 May	794	–	24%	11%	34%	31%
BVA	26-31 May	794	–	21%	—	43%	36%
Ipsos	27–29 May	1,000	–	18%	11%	38%	33%
Ipsos	27–29 May	1,000	–	21%	—	43%	36%
OpinionWay	26–29 May	1,048	–	19%	11%	36%	34%
OpinionWay	26–29 May	1,048	–	21%	—	44%	35%
Harris Interactive	20–24 May	1,218	–	21%	12%	37%	30%
Harris Interactive	20–24 May	1,218	–	24%	—	45%	31%
Harris Interactive	20–24 May	1,218	–	—	18%	48%	34%
Harris Interactive	20–24 May	1,218	–	—	—	59%	41%

== Île-de-France ==
=== First round ===
Polling firm	Fieldwork date	Sample	Abs.	Arthaud LO	Autain LFI–PCF	Pailhac REV	Bayou EELV	Pulvar PS	Berlingen UDMF	Conti Volt	Saint-Martin LREM–MoDem	Pécresse SL–LR	Bardella RN	Brot DIV
2021 election	20 Jun	–												
OpinionWay	13–14 Jun	1,092	–	1%	10%	0%	13%	10%	0%	0%	15%	34%	17%	0%
Ifop	7–11 Jun	982	–	2%	11%	1%	10%	11%	0%	1%	13%	34%	17%	0%
Ipsos	3–7 Jun	1,000	–	2%	10%	1%	12%	10%	0.5%	1%	11%	34%	18%	0.5%
OpinionWay	3–6 Jun	1,046	–	1%	11%	0%	12%	10%	0%	0%	16%	33%	17%	0%
BVA	1–6 Jun	1,241	–	1.5%	8%	1%	12%	10%	0%	0.5%	15%	33%	19%	0%
Elabe	28–31 May	1,144	–	1%	9%	0.5%	10%	12%	1%	1%	15%	35%	16%	0.5%
OpinionWay	27–30 May	1,155	–	0%	10%	0%	12%	9%	0%	0%	16%	34%	19%	0%
Ipsos	24–26 May	939	–	2%	11%	1%	12%	10%	1%	1%	12%	33%	17%	0%

=== Second round ===
Polling firm	Fieldwork date	Sample	Abs.	Bayou EELV–PS–PCF–LFI	Saint-Martin LREM–MoDem	Pécresse SL–LR	Bardella RN
2021 election	27 Jun	–					
OpinionWay	13–14 Jun	1,092	–	27%	17%	39%	17%
Ifop	7–11 Jun	982	—	27%	15%	38%	20%
Ipsos	3–7 Jun	1,000	–	30%	14%	37%	19%
Ipsos	3–7 Jun	1,000	–	33%	—	48%	19%
OpinionWay	3–6 Jun	1,046	–	28%	18%	38%	16%
BVA	1–6 Jun	1,241	–	25%	17%	38%	20%
Elabe	28–31 May	1,144	–	26%	19%	39%	16%
OpinionWay	27–30 May	1,155	–	23%	20%	37%	20%
Ipsos	24–26 May	939	–	31%	15%	36%	18%
Ipsos	24–26 May	939	–	34%	—	47%	19%

== Normandy ==
=== First round ===
Polling firm	Fieldwork date	Sample	Abs.	Le Manach LO	Jumel PCF–LFI	Boulanger PS–EELV	Bonnaterre TdP–LREM	Kerbarh MR	Morin LC–LR	Bay RN
2021 election	20 Jun	—								
OpinionWay	10–13 Jun	1,024	—	2%	8%	16%	15%	1%	30%	28%
Ipsos	3–7 Jun	1,000	—	2%	10%	16%	11%	1%	32%	28%
Elabe	31 May–5 Jun	1,145	—	2%	10%	16%	13%	1%	31%	27%

=== Second round ===
Polling firm	Fieldwork date	Sample	Abs.	Jumel PCF–PS–EELV–LFI	Boulanger PS–EELV–PCF–LFI	Bonnaterre TdP–LREM	Morin LC–LR	Bay RN
2021 election	27 Jun	—						
OpinionWay	10–13 Jun	1,024	—	—	24%	17%	31%	28%
Ipsos	3–7 Jun	1,000	—	—	26%	13%	32%	29%
Elabe	31 May–5 Jun	1,145	—	—	27%	15%	31%	27%
Elabe	31 May–5 Jun	1,145	—	—	30%	—	42%	28%
Elabe	31 May–5 Jun	1,145	—	27%	—	15%	31%	27%
Elabe	31 May–5 Jun	1,145	—	31%	—	—	41%	28%

== Nouvelle-Aquitaine ==
=== First round ===
Polling firm	Fieldwork date	Sample	Abs.	Perchet LO	Guetté LFI	Thierry EELV	Rousset PS–PCF	Darrieussecq MoDem–LREM	Florian LR	Puyjalon LMR–RES	Diaz RN
2021 election	20 Jun	—									
Ifop	2–7 Jun	1,018	—	1%	4%	11%	25%	19%	15%	2%	23%
Ipsos	3–7 Jun	1,000	—	2%	4%	9%	25%	17%	12%	4%	27%
Ifop	26–31 May	1,000	—	1%	5%	11%	24%	19%	14%	3%	23%

=== Second round ===
Polling firm	Fieldwork date	Sample	Abs.	Rousset PS–EELV–PCF–LFI	Darrieussecq MoDem–LREM	Florian LR	Diaz RN
2021 election	27 Jun	—					
Ipsos	3–7 Jun	1,000	—	36%	21%	15%	28%
Ifop	26–31 May	1,000	—	37%	22%	17%	24%
Ifop	26–31 May	1,000	—	42%	30%	—	28%

== Occitanie ==
=== First round ===
Polling firm	Fieldwork date	Sample	Abs.	Adrada LO	Martin LFI	Maurice EELV–POC	Delga PS–PCF	Davezac OPN–RES	Terrail-Novès LREM–MoDem	Pradié LR	Garraud LDP–RN	Le Boursicaud DIV
2021 election	20 Jun	—										
Ifop	7–11 Jun	998	—	1%	4.5%	10%	29%	1.5%	11%	12%	31%	0%
Ipsos	3–7 Jun	1,000	—	2%	4%	8%	30%	0.5%	11%	11%	33%	0.5%
Ifop	21–27 May	1,003	—	0%	6%	10%	26%	0%	13%	14%	30%	1%

=== Second round ===
Polling firm	Fieldwork date	Sample	Abs.	Delga PS–EELV–POC–PCF–LFI	Terrail-Novès LREM–MoDem	Pradié LR	Garraud LDP–RN
2021 election	27 Jun	—					
Ifop	7–11 Jun	998	—	40%	14%	14%	32%
Ifop	7–11 Jun	998	—	44%	—	22%	34%
Ipsos	3–7 Jun	1,000	—	41%	13%	12%	34%
Ifop	21–27 May	1,003	—	37%	16%	16%	31%
Ifop	21–27 May	1,003	—	40%	—	26%	34%

== Pays de la Loire ==
=== First round ===
Polling firm	Fieldwork date	Sample	Abs.	Le Beller LO	Orphelin EELV–LFI	Garot PS–PCF	De Rugy LREM–MoDem	Morançais LR	Bayle DLF	Juvin RN	Rigaudeau DIV
2021 election	20 Jun	—									
Ipsos	3–7 Jun	1,000	—	2%	19%	14%	19%	25%	4%	17%	0%
OpinionWay	25–30 May	1,055	—	1%	17%	14%	17%	26%	3%	21%	1%

=== Second round ===
Polling firm	Fieldwork date	Sample	Abs.	Orphelin EELV–PS–PCF–LFI	Garot PS–EELV–PCF–LFI	De Rugy LREM–MoDem	Morançais LR	Juvin RN
2021 election	27 Jun	—						
Ipsos	3–7 Jun	1,000	—	—	32%	22%	25%	21%
Ipsos	3–7 Jun	1,000	—	32%	—	23%	25%	20%

== Provence-Alpes-Côte d'Azur ==
=== First round ===
Polling firm	Fieldwork date	Sample	Abs.	Bonnet LO	Guerrera POC	Félizia EELV–PS–PCF	Governatori CÉ	Muselier LR–LREM	Chuisano DLF	Mariani LDP–RN	Laupies LS	Vincenzi DIV
2021 election	20 Jun	—										
Ifop	10–14 Jun	960	—	1%	0.5%	17%	3%	34%	3%	41%	0.5%	0%
OpinionWay	7–10 Jun	1,067	—	1%	1%	17%	3%	32%	2%	43%	1%	0%
Ipsos	3–7 Jun	1,000	—	2%	1%	15%	3%	34%	2%	41%	1%	1%
OpinionWay	31 May–3 Jun	1,004	—	1%	0.5%	16%	4%	32%	4%	42%	1%	0.5%
Ifop	26–31 May	1,006	—	1.5%	0.5%	15%	4%	35%	4%	39%	1%	0%
Elabe	21–26 May	1,133	—	2%	0%	12%	6%	33%	2%	43%	2%	0%

=== Second round ===
Polling firm	Fieldwork date	Sample	Abs.	Félizia EELV–PS–PCF	Muselier LR–LREM	Mariani LDP–RN
2021 election	27 Jun	—				
Ifop	10–14 Jun	960	—	20%	36%	44%
Ifop	10–14 Jun	960	—	—	49%	51%
OpinionWay	7–10 Jun	1,067	—	21%	33%	46%
OpinionWay	7–10 Jun	1,067	—	—	48%	52%
Ipsos	3–7 Jun	1,000	—	21%	36%	43%
Ipsos	3–7 Jun	1,000	—	—	49%	51%
OpinionWay	31 May–3 Jun	1,004	—	21%	34%	45%
OpinionWay	31 May–3 Jun	1,004	—	—	48%	52%
Ifop	26–31 May	1,006	—	19%	38%	43%
Ifop	26–31 May	1,006	—	—	51%	49%
Elabe	21–26 May	1,133	—	18%	37%	45%
Elabe	21–26 May	1,133	—	—	50%	50%

== Reunion ==
=== First round ===
Polling firm	Fieldwork date	Sample	Abs.	Payet LO	Bello PLR	Marchau EELV	Bareigts PS–PCR	Hoarau DVG	Lebreton DVG	Miranville CREA	Cadet DVD	Flore CDF	Robert LR	Rivière RN
2021 election	20 Jun	—												
Sagis	21–27 May	500	—	0.5%	22.5%	2%	23.5%	7%	8%	8.5%	2%	0.5%	24%	1.5%
