= 2021 French regional elections =

- 20 and 27 June 2021

All 17 regional presidencies All 1,757 regional councillors All 169 territorial councillors
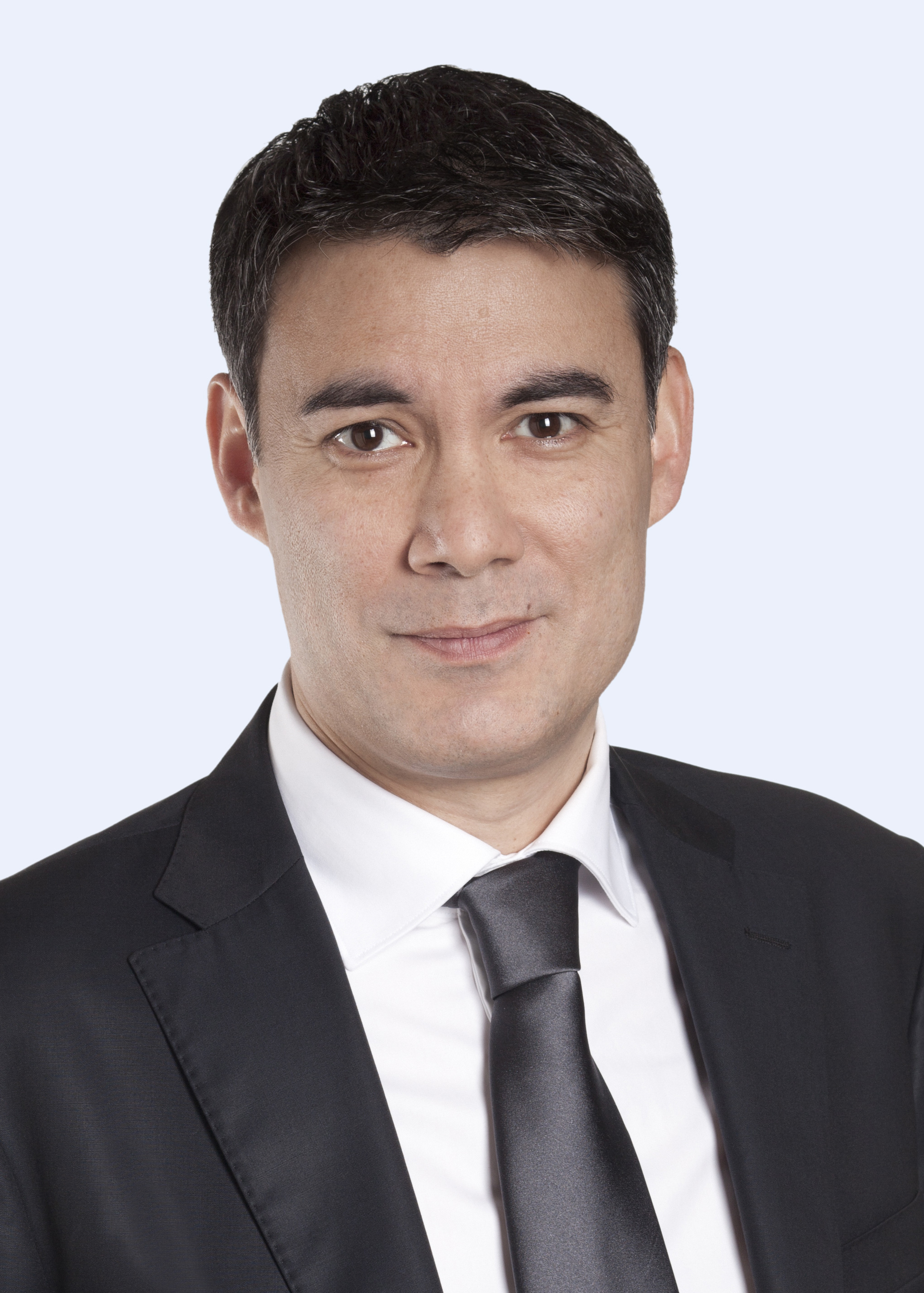

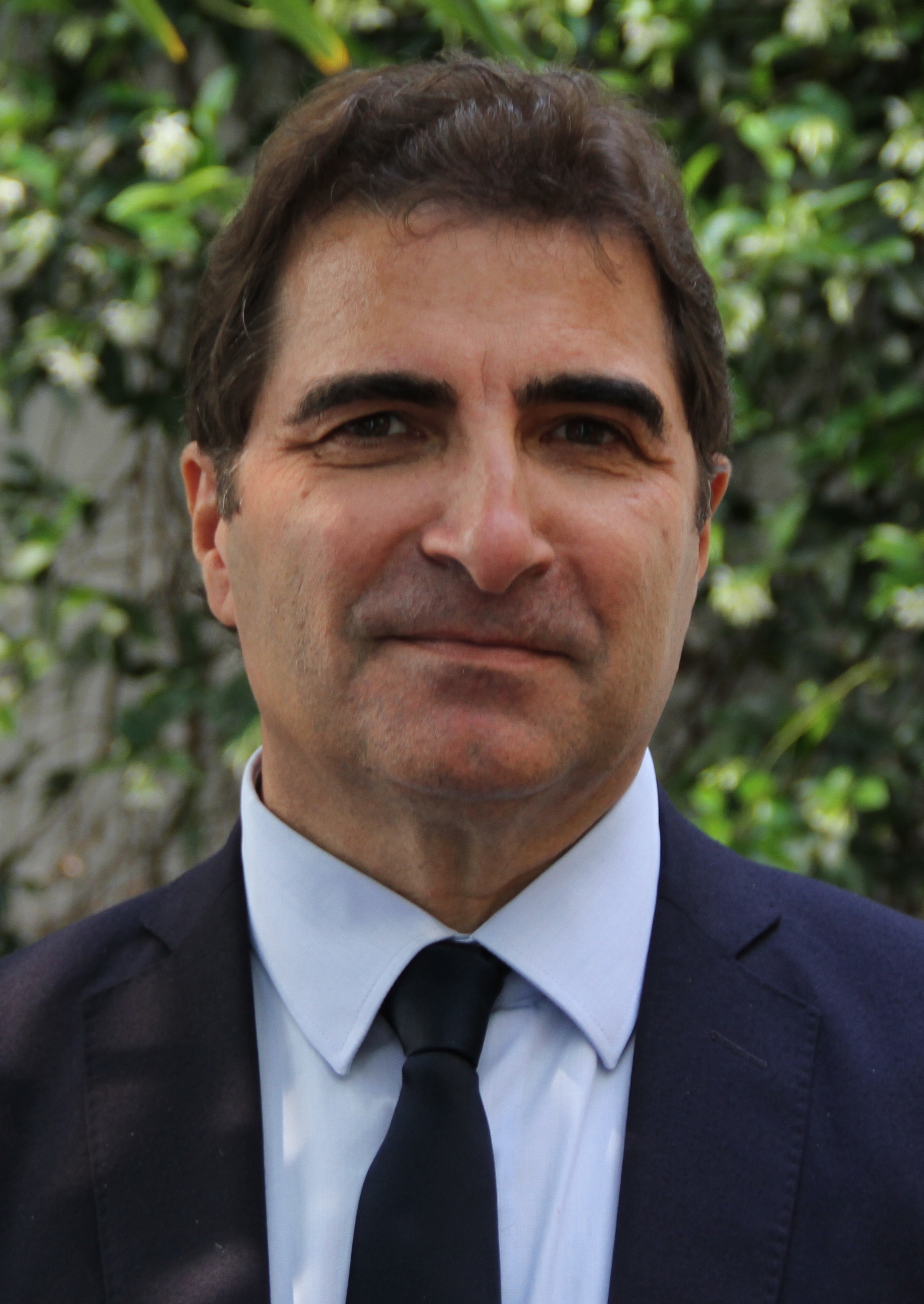

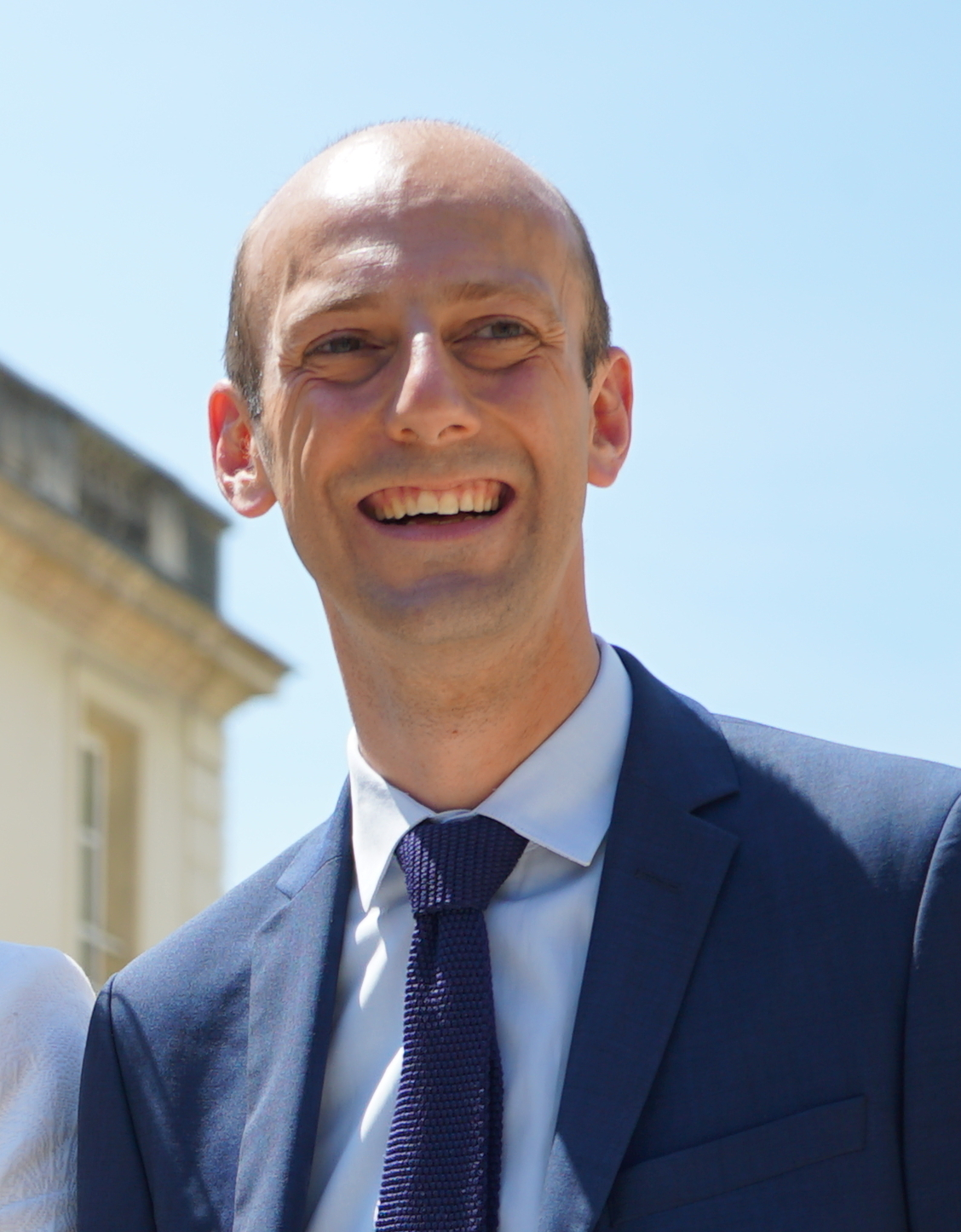

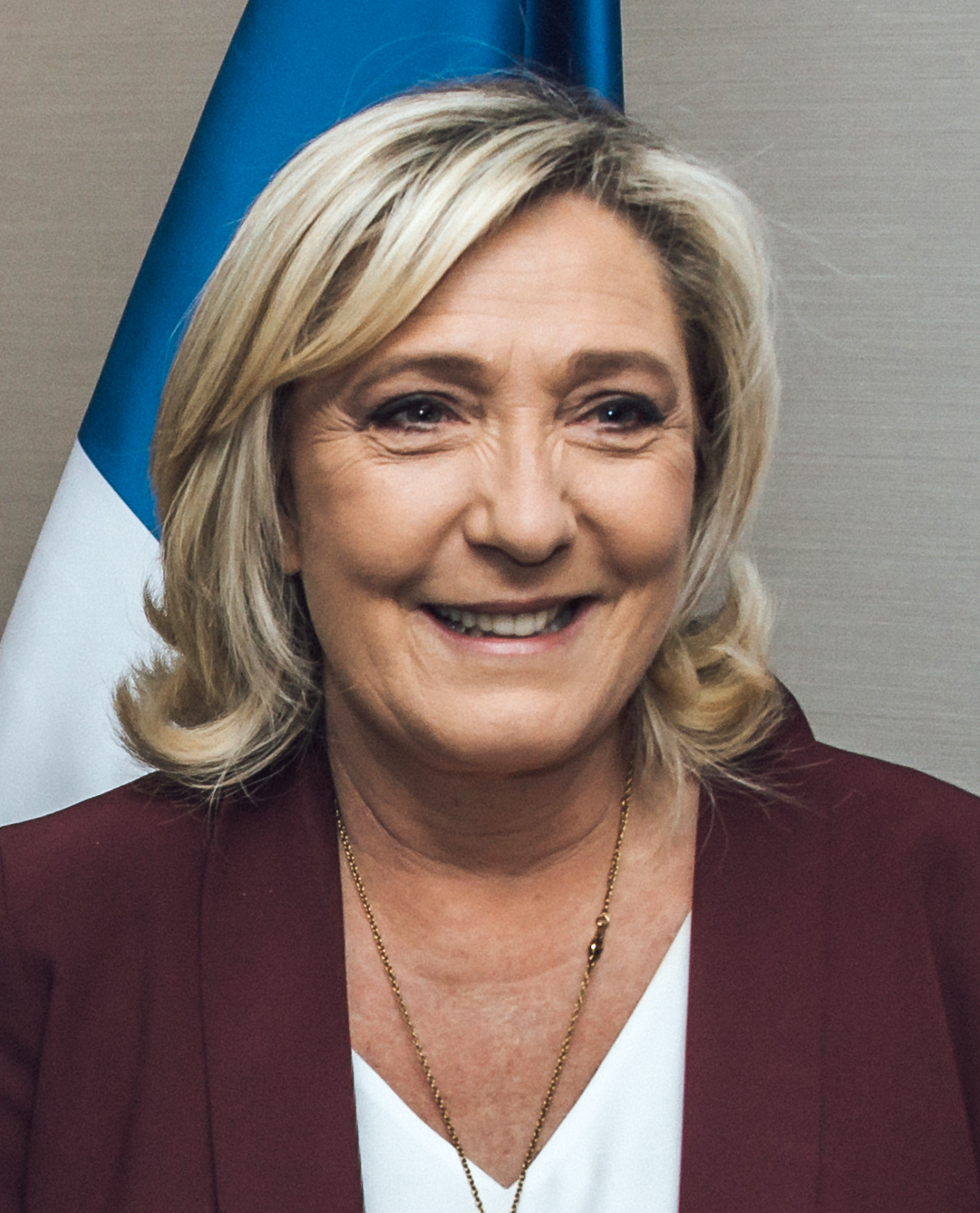

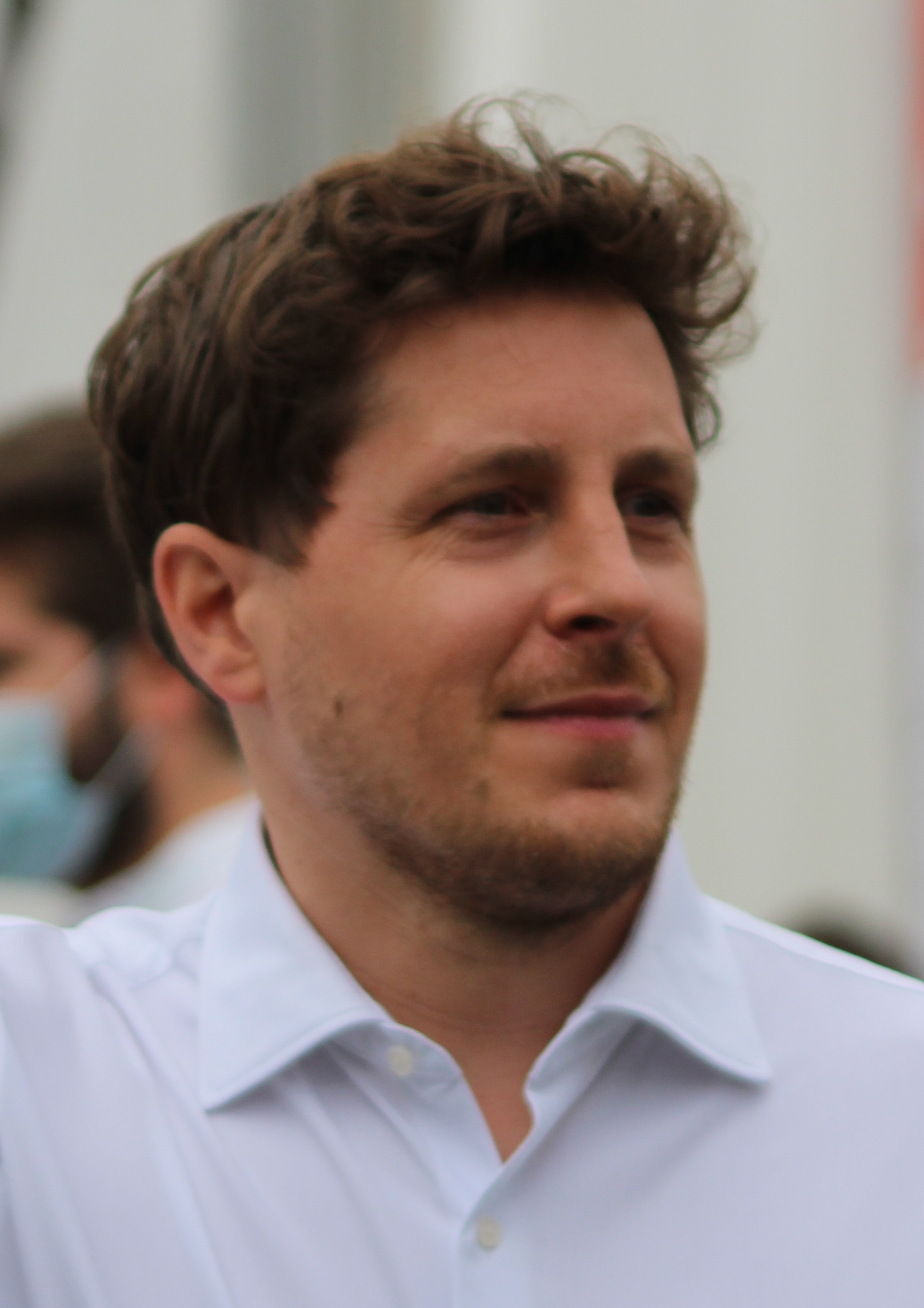
	First party	Second party	Third party
Leader	Olivier Faure	Christian Jacob	Stanislas Guerini
Party	PS	LR	LREM
Regions won	5 + 1 (PCR) + 1 (PPM) + 1 (Péyi-G)	4 + 1 (LC) + 1 (SL) + 1 (DVD)	0 + 1 (GUSR)
Change	▲3	▼1	▼1
First round	4,507,955; 30.66% ▲4.01	4,346,321; 29.56% ▲2.91	1,294,107; 8.80% ▲8.80
Second round	3,685,107; 24.14% ▼4.72	5,942,566; 38.93% ▼1.31	825,050; 5.40% ▲5.40
	Fourth party	Fifth party	Sixth party
	REG
Leader	None	Marine Le Pen	Julien Bayou
Party	Regionalist	RN	EELV
Regions won	1 (FC)	0	0
Change	▼1	Steady	Steady
First round	485,805; 3.30% ▲2.04	2,838,202; 19.30% ▼8.43	1,232,853; 8.38% ▲1.75
Second round	185,920; 1.22% ▲0.93	2,908,302; 19.05% ▼8.05	1,719,493; 11.26% ▲11.26
- Second round results by region; PS DVG LR LC DVD REG

Regional elections were held in France on 20 June and 27 June 2021. At stake were the regional councils in metropolitan and overseas France including the Corsican Assembly, Assembly of French Guiana and Assembly of Martinique, all for a six-year term. The Departmental Council of Mayotte, which also exercises the powers of a region, also participated in this election, because the departmental elections were held at the same time. Eighteen regional presidencies were at stake, with thirteen in mainland France and Corsica, as well as five overseas. Though they do not have legislative autonomy, these territorial collectivities manage sizable budgets. Moreover, regional elections are often perceived as a mid-term opinion poll. Due to the COVID-19 pandemic, the regional and departmental elections were postponed, first to 13 and 20 June 2021 and then to 20 and 27 June 2021.

== Voting system ==
The regional elections are held in direct universal suffrage using proportional representation lists. The election is held over two rounds, with majority bonus. The lists must be gender balanced by alternatively have a male candidate and a female candidate from the top to the bottom of the list. Only lists with as many candidates as available seats in every department of the region may compete. Before 2004, lists could be presented only at the departement level, allowing smaller parties (notably Hunting, Fishing, Nature, Tradition, Alsace d'abord, Lutte Ouvrière, Revolutionary Communist League) to be represented as such in the regional councils and thus forcing major parties to enter into negotiations to rule some regions.

Following the 1999 and 2003 electoral reforms, with a first implementation in 2004, a two-round runoff voting system is used to elect the regional presidents. If no party gets at least 50% of the vote in the first round, a second round is held, which any party who got at least 10% in the first round may enter. Lists that obtain at least 5% of the vote in the first round may merge in the second round with a 'qualified list', which includes candidates from each merged list.

At the decisive round (first round if a list won 50%, the second round if not), the leading list receives a premium of 25% of the seats while the remaining seats are distributed among all lists who received at least 5% of votes. Thus, the majority bonus allows a leading list to have an absolute majority of seats in the Regional Council from one-third of votes in the second round. The seats are distributed among the lists at the regional level but within each list, seats are allocated by departement branch in proportion to the number of votes in each department.

== Background ==
When National Rally MEP Jordan Bardella tweeted criticism of Muslim LREM candidate Sara Zemmahi for wearing a hijab in a campaign poster, Executive Officer of La République En Marche! Stanislas Guerini responded in agreement and Zammahi was barred from running as a LREM candidate. Guerini claimed that "wearing ostentatious religious symbols on a campaign document is not compatible with the values of LREM". This was condemned by fellow LREM deputies Coralie Dubost and Caroline Janvier.

== National results ==
=== By region ===
Region		President Before	Party	President After	Party
Auvergne-Rhône-Alpes		Laurent Wauquiez	LR	Laurent Wauquiez	LR
Bourgogne-Franche-Comté		Marie-Guite Dufay	PS	Marie-Guite Dufay	PS
Brittany		Loïg Chesnais-Girard	PS	Loïg Chesnais-Girard	PS
Centre-Val de Loire		François Bonneau	PS	François Bonneau	PS
Corsica	Assembly	Jean-Guy Talamoni	CL	Marie-Antoinette Maupertuis	FC
Corsica	Executive Council	Gilles Simeoni	FC	Gilles Simeoni	FC
Grand Est		Jean Rottner	LR	Jean Rottner	LR
Guadeloupe		Ary Chalus	GUSR	Ary Chalus	GUSR
French Guiana	Assembly	Rodolphe Alexandre	GR	Gabriel Serville	Péyi-G
Hauts-de-France		Xavier Bertrand	DVD	Xavier Bertrand	DVD
Île-de-France		Valérie Pécresse	SL	Valérie Pécresse	SL
Réunion		Didier Robert	DVD	Huguette Bello	PCR
Martinique	Assembly	Claude Lise	RDM	Lucien Saliber	DVG
Martinique	Executive Council	Alfred Marie-Jeanne	MIM	Serge Letchimy	PPM
Normandy		Hervé Morin	LC	Hervé Morin	LC
Nouvelle-Aquitaine		Alain Rousset	PS	Alain Rousset	PS
Occitanie		Carole Delga	PS	Carole Delga	PS
Pays de la Loire		Christelle Morançais	LR	Christelle Morançais	LR
Provence-Alpes-Côte d'Azur		Renaud Muselier	LR	Renaud Muselier	LR

== Results by region ==
=== Auvergne-Rhône-Alpes ===
Outgoing president : Laurent Wauquiez (LR)

2021 Regional elections in Auvergne-Rhône-Alpes
Candidate	List	First round		Second round		Seats	+/-
Candidate	List	Votes	%	Votes	%	Seats	+/-
Laurent Wauquiez *	LR-UDI-LMR-VIA	751,375	43.85	960,785	55.20	136	+23
Fabienne Grébert	EÉLV-G·s-GÉ	248,017	14.47	585,039	33.61	51	-6
Najat Vallaud-Belkacem	PS-PRG-GRS-CÉ	195,727	11.42	585,039	33.61	51	-6
Cécile Cukierman	PCF-LFI	95,434	5.57	585,039	33.61	51	-6
Andréa Kotarac	RN-LDP	211,178	12.32	194,789	11.19	17	-17
Bruno Bonnell	MR-LREM-MoDem-Agir	168,292	9.82				
Chantal Gomez	LO	26,742	1.56				
Shella Gill	DIV	11,198	0.65				
Farid Omeir	UDMF	5,684	0.33				
Valid votes		1,713,647	97.30	1,740,613	96.57		
Blank ballots		30,859	1.75	41,392	2.30		
Null Ballots		16,712	0.95	20,502	1.14		
Turnout		1,761,218	32.59	1,802,507	33.35	204	Steady
Abstentions		3,642,126	67.41	3,602,658	66.65		
Registered voters		5,403,344	100	5,405,165	100		

=== Bourgogne-Franche-Comté ===
Outgoing president : Marie-Guite Dufay (PS)

2021 Regional elections in Bourgogne-Franche-Comté
Candidate	List	First round		Second round		Seats	+/-
Candidate	List	Votes	%	Votes	%	Seats	+/-
Marie-Guite Dufay *	PS-PRG-PCF	173,393	26.52	289,926	42.20	57	+6
Stéphanie Modde	EÉLV-CÉ-GÉ	67,618	10.34	289,926	42.20	57	+6
Gilles Platret	LR-UDI-LMR-DLF-MEI	137,596	21.04	166,446	24.23	18	-7
Julien Odoul	RN-LDP	151,625	23.19	163,363	23.78	18	-6
Denis Thuriot	LREM-MoDem-Agir	76,457	11.69	67,220	9.79	7	+7
Bastien Faudot	GRS-LFI-G.s	29,424	4.50				
Claire Rocher	LO	17,829	2.73				
Valid votes		653,942	95.33	686,955	95.58		
Blank ballots		21,293	3.10	20,109	2.80		
Null Ballots		10,770	1.57	11,680	1.63		
Turnout		686,005	34.88	718,744	36.54	100	Steady
Abstentions		1,281,027	65.12	1,248,387	63.46		
Registered voters		1,967,032	100	1,967,131	100		

=== Brittany ===
Outgoing president : Loïg Chesnais-Girard (PS)

2021 Regional elections in Brittany
Candidate	List	First round		Second round		Seats	+/-
Candidate	List	Votes	%	Votes	%	Seats	+/-
Loïg Chesnais-Girard *	PS-PRG-PCF	178,362	20.95	260,918	29.84	40	-13
Daniel Cueff	BMV	55,514	6.52	260,918	29.84	40	-13
Isabelle Le Callennec	LR-LMR-LC	138,541	16.28	192,127	21.98	14	-4
Claire Desmares-Poirrier	EÉLV-UDB-G·s-CÉ-GÉ	126,313	14.84	176,767	20.22	12	+12
Thierry Burlot	LREM-MoDem-UDI-Agir-Volt-TdP	132,220	15.53	128,915	14.75	9	+9
Gilles Pennelle	RN-LDP	121,452	14.27	115,541	13.22	8	-4
Pierre-Yves Cadalen	LFI	47,444	5.57				
Valérie Hamon	LO	19,208	2.26				
Joannic Martin	PB	13,192	1.55				
David Cabas	DLF	11,919	1.40				
Christophe Daviet	DIV	4,198	0.49				
Yves Chauvel	EXD	1,844	0.22				
Kamel Elahiar	UDMF	1,030	0.12				
Valid votes		851,237	95.39	874,268	95.67		
Blank ballots		24,211	2.71	20,771	2.27		
Null Ballots		16,967	1.90	18,825	2.06		
Turnout		892,415	35.79	913,864	36.62	83	Steady
Abstentions		1,601,187	64.21	1,581,386	63.38		
Registered voters		2,493,602	100	2,495,250	100		

=== Centre-Val de Loire ===
Outgoing president : François Bonneau (PS)

2021 Regional elections in Centre-Val de Loire
Candidate	List	First round		Second round		Seats	+/-
Candidate	List	Votes	%	Votes	%	Seats	+/-
François Bonneau *	PS-MR-PRG-PCF-CÉ	141,136	24.81	225,697	39.15	42	+2
Charles Fournier	EÉLV-LFI-G.s-GÉ-LRDG-AE-ANLD	61,690	10.85	225,697	39.15	42	+2
Nicolas Forissier	LR-UDI-LMR-LC	107,031	18.82	130,306	22.61	13	-7
Aleksandar Nikolic	RN-LDP-PL-LAF	126,489	22.24	128,183	22.24	13	-4
Marc Fesneau	MoDem-LREM-Agir-LC-TdP-UDI diss.	94,712	16.65	92,259	16.00	9	+9
Jérémy Clément	ECO	23,171	4.07				
Farida Megdoud	LO	14,555	2.56				
Valid votes		568,784	95.63	576,445	95.76		
Blank ballots		16,327	2.75	17,222	2.86		
Null Ballots		9,666	1.63	8,272	1.37		
Turnout		594,777	32.74	601,939	33.13	77	Steady
Abstentions		1,221,658	67.26	1,214,716	66.87		
Registered voters		1,816,435	100	1,816,655	100		

=== Corsica ===
2021 Corsican territorial election
- 20 & 27 June 2021
- All 63 seats in the Assembly; 32 seats needed for a majority
Party	Leader	Vote %	Seats	+/–
FaC	Gilles Simeoni	29.19	32	+4
CCB–LR–UDI	Laurent Marcangeli	24.86	17	+1
PNC–CL	Jean-Christophe Angelini	20.12	8	−5
Rinnovu	Paul-Félix Benedetti	8.39	6	+6
TdP–LREM–RM	Jean-Charles Orsucci	5.92	0	−6
This lists parties that won seats. See the complete results below.
President of the Regional Council before	President of the Regional Council after
Gilles Simeoni; FaC	Gilles Simeoni; FaC

Outgoing president of the Executive council : Gilles Simeoni (FC)
Outgoing president of the Assembly : Jean-Guy Talamoni (CL)

2021 Territorial elections in Corsica
Candidate	List	First round		Second round		Seats	+/-
Candidate	List	Votes	%	Votes	%	Seats	+/-
Gilles Simeoni *	FC	39,247	29.19	55,548	40.64	32	+14
Laurent Marcangeli	A!-LR-CCB	33,432	24.86	43,769	32.02	17	+1
Jean-Christophe Angelini	PNC	17,772	13.22	20,604	15.07	8	-15
Jean-Guy Talamoni *	CL	9,280	6.90	20,604	15.07	8	-15
Paul-Félix Benedetti	Rinnovu	11,282	8.39	16,762	12.26	6	+6
Jean-Charles Orsucci	TdP-LREM	7,957	5.92			0	-6
François Filoni	RN	5,378	4.00				
Agnès Simonpietri	EÉLV-G.s-GÉ	5,039	3.75				
Michel Stefani	PCF	4,279	3.18				
Jean-Antoine Giacomi	EXD	791	0.59				
Valid votes		134,457	98.22	136,683	96.79		
Blank ballots		1,144	0.84	2,334	1.65		
Null Ballots		1,286	0.94	2,206	1.56		
Turnout		136,887	57.08	141,223	58.91	63	Steady
Abstentions		102,921	42.92	98,495	41.09		
Registered voters		239,808	100	239,718	100		

=== Grand Est ===
Outgoing president : Jean Rottner (LR)

2021 Regional elections in the Grand Est
Candidate	List	First round		Second round		Seats	+/-
Candidate	List	Votes	%	Votes	%	Seats	+/-
Jean Rottner *	LR-UDI-LMR	335,954	31.15	445,185	40.30	94	-10
Laurent Jacobelli	RN-LDP-CNIP-DR	227,775	21.12	290,556	26.30	33	-13
Éliane Romani	EÉLV-PS-PCF-CÉ-GÉ	157,461	14.60	234,450	21.22	27	+8
Brigitte Klinkert	LREM-MoDem-Agir	116,120	10.77	134,414	12.17	15	+15
Aurélie Filippetti	G·s-LFI-GRS	93,168	8.64				
Florian Philippot	LP-VIA	74,980	6.95				
Martin Meyer	UL	39,568	3.67				
Louise Fève	LO	28,091	2.60				
Adil Tyane	UDMF	5,262	0.49				
Valid votes		1,078,379	95.08	1,104,605	95.35		
Blank ballots		34,389	3.03	32,948	2.84		
Null Ballots		21,411	1.89	20,890	1.80		
Turnout		1,134,179	29.61	1,158,443	30.24	169	Steady
Abstentions		2,695,773	70.39	2,672,636	69.76		
Registered voters		3,829,952	100	3,831,079	100		

=== Guadeloupe ===
2021 Guadeloupean territorial election
- 20 & 27 June 2021
- All 41 seats on the Regional Council; 21 seats needed for a majority
Party	Leader	Vote %	Seats	+/–
GUSR	Ary Chalus	72.43	33	+5
PS	Josette Borel-Lincertin	27.57	5	−8
This lists parties that won seats. See the complete results below.
President before	President after
Ary Chalus; GUSR	Ary Chalus; GUSR

Outgoing president : Ary Chalus (GUSR)

2021 Regional elections in Guadeloupe
Candidate	List	First round		Second round		Seats	+/-
Candidate	List	Votes	%	Votes	%	Seats	+/-
Ary Chalus *	GUSR-LREM	45,110	49.31	77,475	72.43	33	+5
Josette Borel-Lincertin	FGPS-CELV	15,900	17.38	29,485	27.57	8	-5
Ronald Selbonne	ANG-UPLG	8,591	9.39				
Max Mathiasin	PPDG-PSG	5,090	5.56				
Sonia Petro	LR-UDI	3,370	3.68				
Maxette Pirbakas-Grisoni	RN	3,131	3.42				
Éric Coriolan	DIV	2,638	2.88				
Jean-Marie Nomertin	LO	2,443	2.67				
Alain Plaisir	CIPPA	2,324	2.54				
Christelle Nanor	LGCA	1,287	1.41				
Willy William	DIV	1,069	1.17				
Tony Delannay	DLF	532	0.58				
Valid votes		91,485	93.95	106,960	91.65		
Blank ballots		2,405	2.47	4,040	3.46		
Null Ballots		3,489	3.58	5,705	4.89		
Turnout		97,379	30.77	116,705	36.88	41	Steady
Abstentions		219,093	69.23	199,760	63.12		
Registered voters		316,472	100	316,465	100		

=== French Guiana ===
Outgoing president of the Assembly : Rodolphe Alexandre (GR)

2021 Territorial elections in French Guiana
Candidate	List	First round		Second round		Seats	+/-
Candidate	List	Votes	%	Votes	%	Seats	+/-
Gabriel Serville	Péyi G-G.s-LFI	9,510	27.68	25,342	54.83	35	+19
Jean-Paul Fereira	AGEG-PSG-Walwari-MDES	8,020	23.34	25,342	54.83	35	+19
Jessi Americain	DVG	1,811	5.27	25,342	54.83	35	+19
Rodolphe Alexandre *	GR	15,020	43.71	20,879	45.17	20	-15
Valid votes		34,361	96.99	46,221	97.21		
Blank ballots		533	1.50	714	1.50		
Null Ballots		532	1.50	615	1.29		
Turnout		35,426	34.79	47,550	46.78	55	▲4
Abstentions		66,392	65.21	54,089	53.22		
Registered voters		101,818	100	101,639	100		

=== Hauts-de-France ===
Outgoing president : Xavier Bertrand (DVD)

2021 Regional elections in the Hauts-de-France
Candidate	List	First round		Second round		Seats	+/-
Candidate	List	Votes	%	Votes	%	Seats	+/-
Xavier Bertrand *	LR-UDI-SL-LMR-RAD	551,068	41.42	708,518	52.37	110	-6
Sébastien Chenu	RN-LDP-CNIP	324,260	24.37	346,918	25.64	32	-22
Karima Delli	EÉLV-PS-PRG-PCF-G·s-LFI-GÉ	252,404	18.97	297,395	21.98	28	+28
Laurent Pietraszewski	LREM-MoDem-Agir	121,466	9.13				
Éric Pecqueur	LO	47,325	3.56				
José Évrard	DLF	27,205	2.04				
Audric Alexandre	PACE-Volt-NC	6,700	0.50				
Valid votes		1,330,428	95.85	1,352,831	96.45		
Blank ballots		34,895	2.51	27,904	1.99		
Null Ballots		22,770	1.64	21,948	1.56		
Turnout		1,388,093	32.84	1,402,683	33.18	170	Steady
Abstentions		2,838,834	67.16	2,824,949	66.82		
Registered voters		4,226,927	100	4,227,532	100		

=== Île-de-France ===
Outgoing president : Valérie Pécresse (SL)

2021 Regional elections in Île-de-France
Candidate	List	First round		Second round		Seats	+/-
Candidate	List	Votes	%	Votes	%	Seats	+/-
Valérie Pécresse *	SL-LR-UDI-MEI	785,576	36.19	1,076,821	45.92	125	+4
Julien Bayou	EÉLV-G·s-CÉ-GÉ	282,502	13.01	789,666	33.67	53	-13
Audrey Pulvar	PS-PRG-GRS	240,839	11.10	789,666	33.67	53	-13
Clémentine Autain	LFI-PCF	222,456	10.25	789,666	33.67	53	-13
Jordan Bardella	RN-LDP	285,115	13.14	253,001	10.79	16	-6
Laurent Saint-Martin	LREM-MoDem-Agir	256,402	11.81	225,482	9.62	15	+15
Victor Pailhac	REV	38,831	1.79				
Nathalie Arthaud	LO	31,956	1.47				
Éric Berlingen	UDMF	12,732	0.59				
Lionel Brot	DIV	11,582	0.49				
Fabiola Conti	Volt-PACE-NC-ANLD	3,629	0.17				
Valid votes		2,175,649	97.47	2,344,999	97.37		
Blank ballots		36,807	1.65	42,255	1.75		
Null Ballots		19,685	0.88	21,082	0.88		
Turnout		2,232,141	30.83	2,408,336	33.26	209	Steady
Abstentions		5,008,807	69.17	4,833,310	66.74		
Registered voters		7,240,948	100	7,241,646	100		

=== Martinique ===
Outgoing president of the Executive council : Alfred Marie-Jeanne (MIM)
Outgoing president of the Assembly : Claude Lise (RDM)

2021 Territorial elections in Martinique
Candidate	List	First round		Second round		Seats	+/-
Candidate	List	Votes	%	Votes	%	Seats	+/-
Serge Letchimy	PPM	30,267	31.66	50,104	37.72	26	+8
Alfred Marie-Jeanne *	MIM-Palima-ME	24,664	25.80	46,857	35.27	14	-8
Catherine Conconne	DVG	10,166	10.63	19,220	14.47	6	+6
Jean-Philippe Nilor	Péyi A-RDM	11,481	12.01	16,664	12.54	5	-3
Yan Monplaisir	LR	4,470	4.68			0	-3
Philippe Jock	DVD	3,747	3.92				
Béatrice Bellay	FSM	3,407	3.56				
Olivier Bérisson	MUN	2,135	2.23				
Max Orville	MoDem	1,379	1.44				
Ralph Monplaisir	LREM	1,042	1.09				
Guy Ferdinand	DVD	1,018	0.16				
Marcel Sellaye	GRS	661	0.69				
Philippe Petit	UDI	612	0.64				
Gabriel Jean-Marie	CO	565	0.59				
Valid votes		95,614	96.12	132,845	96.67		
Blank ballots		1,901	1.91	2,329	1.69		
Null Ballots		1,958	1.97	2,244	1.63		
Turnout		99,473	32.45	137,418	44.83	51	Steady
Abstentions		207,057	67.55	169,080	55.17		
Registered voters		306,530	100	306,498	100		

=== Normandy ===
Outgoing president : Hervé Morin (LC)

2021 Regional elections in Normandy
Candidate	List	First round		Second round		Seats	+/-
Candidate	List	Votes	%	Votes	%	Seats	+/-
Hervé Morin *	LC-LR-LMR	278,263	36.86	332,889	44.26	60	+6
Mélanie Boulanger	PS-PRG-EÉLV-G·s-CÉ-GÉ	138,647	18.37	196,893	26.18	20	-2
Nicolas Bay	RN-LDP	149,946	19.86	146,838	19.52	15	-6
Laurent Bonnaterre	TdP-LREM-MoDem-Agir	83,588	11.07	75,511	10.04	7	+7
Sébastien Jumel	PCF-LFI	72,777	9.64			0	-5
Pascal Le Manach	LO	23,733	3.14				
Stéphanie Kerbarh	MR	7,971	1.06				
Valid votes		754,925	95.95	752,131	95.80		
Blank ballots		21,254	2.70	22,776	2.90		
Null Ballots		10,583	1.35	10,173	1.30		
Turnout		786,762	32.99	785,080	32.91	102	Steady
Abstentions		1,598,056	67.01	1,600,116	67.09		
Registered voters		2,384,818	100	2,385,196	100		

=== Nouvelle-Aquitaine ===
Outgoing president : Alain Rousset (PS)

2021 Regional elections in Nouvelle-Aquitaine
Candidate	List	First round		Second round		Seats	+/-
Candidate	List	Votes	%	Votes	%	Seats	+/-
Alain Rousset *	PS-PRG-PCF	430,659	28.83	598,193	39.51	101	+12
Edwige Diaz	RN-LDP	271,771	18.20	289,258	19.11	26	-3
Nicolas Florian	LR	186,348	13.71	214,859	14.19	19	-28
Nicolas Thierry	EÉLV-G.s-CÉ-GÉ-GRS	180,551	12.09	214,767	14.19	19	+1
Geneviève Darrieussecq	MoDem-LREM-Agir-UDI	204,467	13.71	196,894	13.01	18	+18
Eddie Puyjalon	LMR-RES	108,882	7.29				
Clémence Guetté	LFI	84,630	5.67				
Guillaume Perchet	LO	26,012	1.74				
Valid votes		1,493,620	95.43	1,513,971	95.10		
Blank ballots		39,346	2.51	42,396	2.66		
Null Ballots		32,216	2.06	35,641	2.24		
Turnout		1,565,182	35.96	1,592,008	36.57	183	Steady
Abstentions		2,787,124	64.04	2,760,872	63.43		
Registered voters		4,352,306	100	4,352,880	100		

=== Occitanie ===
Outgoing president : Carole Delga (PS)

2021 Regional elections in Occitanie
Candidate	List	First round		Second round		Seats	+/-
Candidate	List	Votes	%	Votes	%	Seats	+/-
Carole Delga *	PS-PRG-PCF-GRS	597,157	39.57	882,166	57.78	109	+33
Jean-Paul Garraud	LDP-RN	341,254	22.61	366,471	24.00	28	-12
Aurélien Pradié	LR-UDI-LMR	183,980	12.19	278,253	18.22	21	-4
Antoine Maurice	EÉLV-G.s-CÉ-GÉ-POC-MEI	133,383	8.84			0	-12
Vincent Terrail-Novès	LREM-MoDem-Agir	132,487	8.78			0	
Myriam Martin	LFI-NPA	76,381	5.06			0	-5
Malena Adrada	LO	26,720	1.77				
Jean-Luc Davezac	OPN-RES	11,510	0.76				
Anthony Le Boursicaud	DIV	6,209	0.41				
Valid votes		1,509,081	96.03	1,526,890	95.61		
Blank ballots		36,176	2.30	41,120	2.57		
Null Ballots		26,262	1.67	28,934	1.81		
Turnout		1,571,519	37.24	1,596,944	37.83	158	Steady
Abstentions		2,648,964	62.76	2,623,888	62.17		
Registered voters		4,220,483	100	4,220,832	100		

=== Pays de la Loire ===
Outgoing president : Christelle Morançais (LR)

2021 Regional elections in the Pays de la Loire
Candidate	List	First round		Second round		Seats	+/-
Candidate	List	Votes	%	Votes	%	Seats	+/-
Christelle Morançais *	LR-UDI	278,948	34.30	392,640	46.45	57	+3
Matthieu Orphelin	EÉLV-LFI-G.s-GÉ	152,081	18.70	294,705	34.86	24	-2
Guillaume Garot	PS-PRG-PCF-GRS-UDB	132,693	16.32	294,705	34.86	24	-2
Hervé Juvin	RN-LDP	101,951	12.54	88,603	10.48	7	-6
François de Rugy	LREM-MoDem-Agir	97,371	11.97	69,349	8.20	5	+5
Cécile Bayle de Jessé	DLF	24,078	2.96				
Eddy Le Beller	LO	21,350	2.63				
Linda Rigaudeau	DIV	4,845	0.60				
Valid votes		813,317	95.37	845,297	96.16		
Blank ballots		24,669	2.89	20,663	2.35		
Null Ballots		14,847	1.74	13,084	1.49		
Turnout		852,833	30.73	879,044	31.66	93	Steady
Abstentions		1,922,512	69.27	1,897,047	68.34		
Registered voters		2,775,345	100	2,776,091	100		

=== Provence-Alpes-Côte-d'Azur ===
Outgoing president : Renaud Muselier (LR)

2021 Regional elections in Provence-Alpes-Côte-d'Azur
Candidate	List	First round		Second round		Seats	+/-
Candidate	List	Votes	%	Votes	%	Seats	+/-
Renaud Muselier *	LR-UDI-LREM-MoDem-Agir-LMR	368,937	31.91	704,431	57.30	84	+3
Thierry Mariani	LDP-RN-CNIP	420,633	36.38	524,882	42.70	39	-3
Jean-Laurent Félizia	EÉLV-PS-PRG-PCF-GRS-G.s-GÉ	195,233	16.89				
Jean-Marc Governatori	CÉ	60,991	5.28				
Isabelle Bonnet	LO	31,878	2.76				
Noël Chuisano	DLF	31,204	2.70				
Hervé Guerrera	POC	25,209	2.18				
Valérie Laupies	LS	19,146	1.66				
Mikael Vincenzi	DIV	2,838	0.25				
Valid votes		1,156,069	95.75	1,229,313	93.18		
Blank ballots		33,522	2.78	63,299	4.80		
Null Ballots		17,730	1.47	26,734	2.03		
Turnout		1,207,391	33.72	1,319,346	36.84	123	Steady
Abstentions		2,373,318	66.28	2,261,991	63.16		
Registered voters		3,580,639	100	3,581,337	100		

=== Réunion ===
2021 French regional elections
- 20 & 27 June 2021

All 45 seats on the Regional Council 23 seats needed for a majority
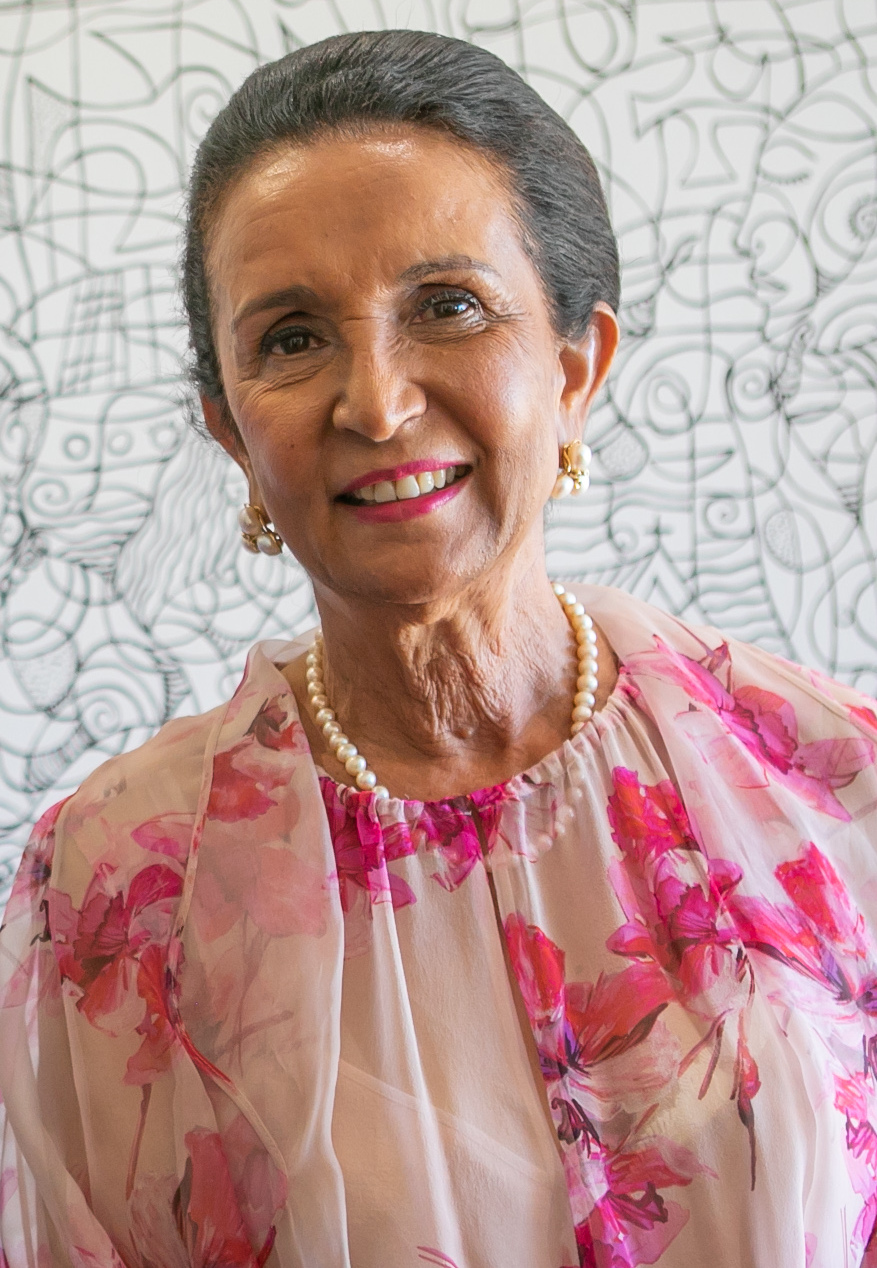

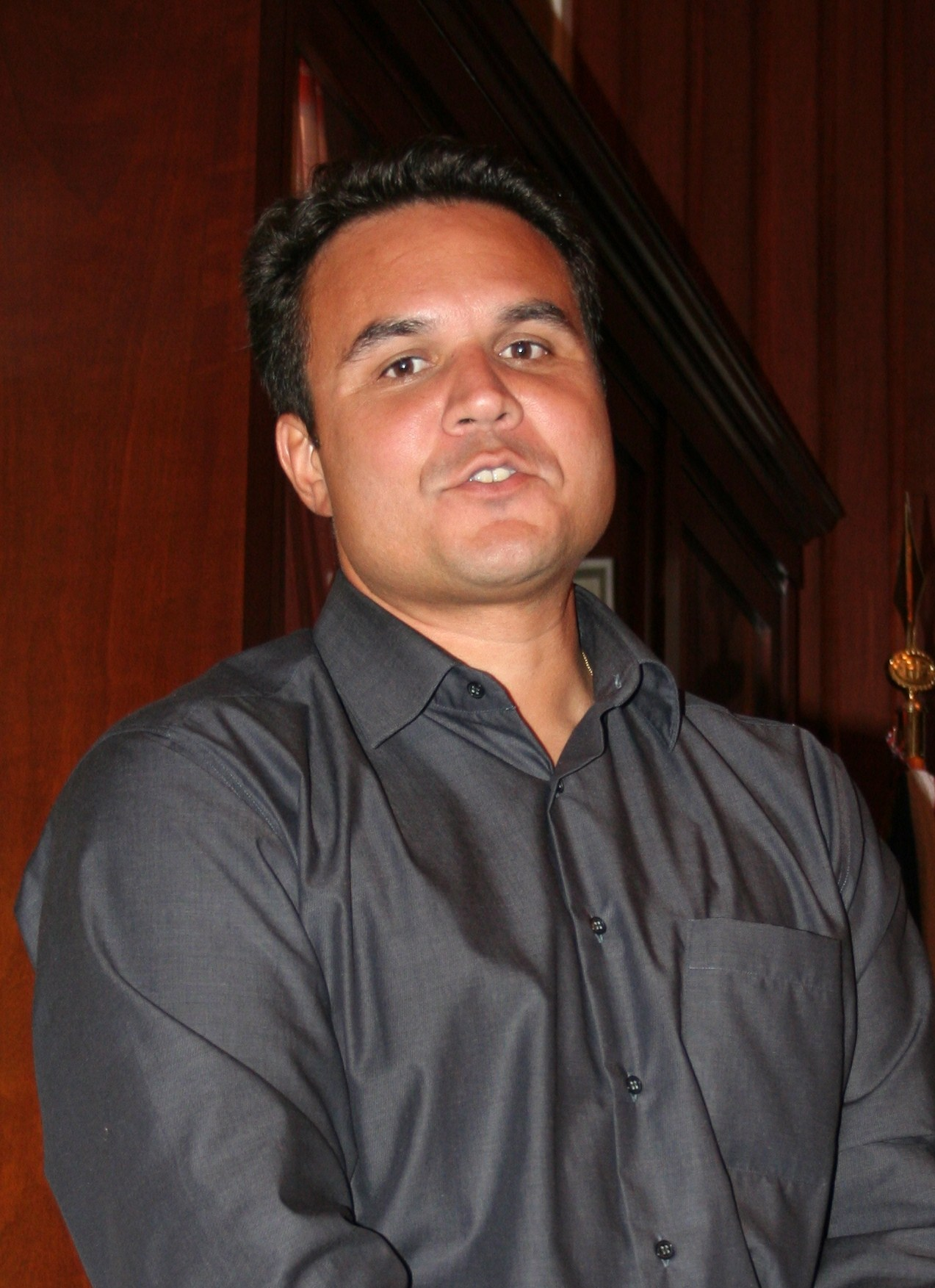
	First party	Second party
Leader	Huguette Bello	Didier Robert
Party	PLR	LR
Alliance	Left	Right
Seats before	16	29
Seats won	29	16
Seat change	▲13	▼13
First round	47,889; 20.74% ▼3.06	71,798; 31.09% ▼9.27
Second round	152,639; 51.85% ▲4.54	141,745; 48.15% ▼4.54
President before election
Didier Robert
LR
Elected President
Huguette Bello
PLR

Outgoing president : Didier Robert (DVD)

2021 Regional elections in Réunion
Candidate	List	First round		Second round		Seats	+/-
Candidate	List	Votes	%	Votes	%	Seats	+/-
Huguette Bello	PLR-LFI	47,889	20.74	152,639	51.85	29	+13
Ericka Bareigts	PS-PCR	42,682	18.48	152,639	51.85	29	+13
Patrick Lebreton	DVG	17,977	7.78	152,639	51.85	29	+13
Didier Robert *	LR	71,798	31.09	141,745	48.15	16	-13
Vanessa Miranville	CREA	22,879	9.91				
Olivier Hoarau	DVG	9,800	4.24				
Philippe Cadet	RCR	6,107	2.64				
Jean-Pierre Marchau	EÉLV-GÉ	4,632	2.01				
Joseph Rivière	RN	4,012	1.74				
Jean-Yves Payet	LO	2,627	1.14				
Corinne de Flore	CPDF	506	0.22				
Valid votes		230,919	94.72	294,384	94.71		
Blank ballots		6,158	2.53	8,027	2.58		
Null Ballots		6,710	2.75	8,414	2.71		
Turnout		243,787	36.46	310,825	46.50	45	Steady
Abstentions		424,830	63.54	357,627	53.50		
Registered voters		668,617	100	668,452	100		

== Analysis ==
All incumbent regional presidents retained their seats. Three of them (Xavier Bertrand of Hauts-de-France, Laurent Wauquiez of Auvergne-Rhône-Alpes and Valérie Pécresse of Île-de-France) were seen in the case of victory as potential contenders of presidential elections of 2022.

Results showed some recovery to the Socialist Party as well (most notably, in Occitanie).

Before the elections, pundits discussed the possibility of the National Rally winning a region (Provence-Alpes-Côte d’Azur), but they failed to do it and underperformed compared to their polling. The party's support dropped in all regions (most notably, in Hauts-de-France).

The La République En Marche failed to win any regional presidency.
