= Regional Council of Pays de la Loire =

Deliberative regional assembly in France

Regional Council of Pays de la Loire Conseil régional des Pays de la Loire
- Logo of the Pays de la Loire region

Type
- Type: Unicameral

Leadership
- President: Christelle Morançais, LR since 19 October 2017

Structure
- Seats: 93
- Political groups: Majority (57): The Republicans (43); Union of Democrats and Independents (14); Opposition (36): Europe Ecology-The Greens - La France Insoumise (12); Socialist Party - French Communist Party (12); National Rally (7); Ensemble Citoyens (5)

Meeting place
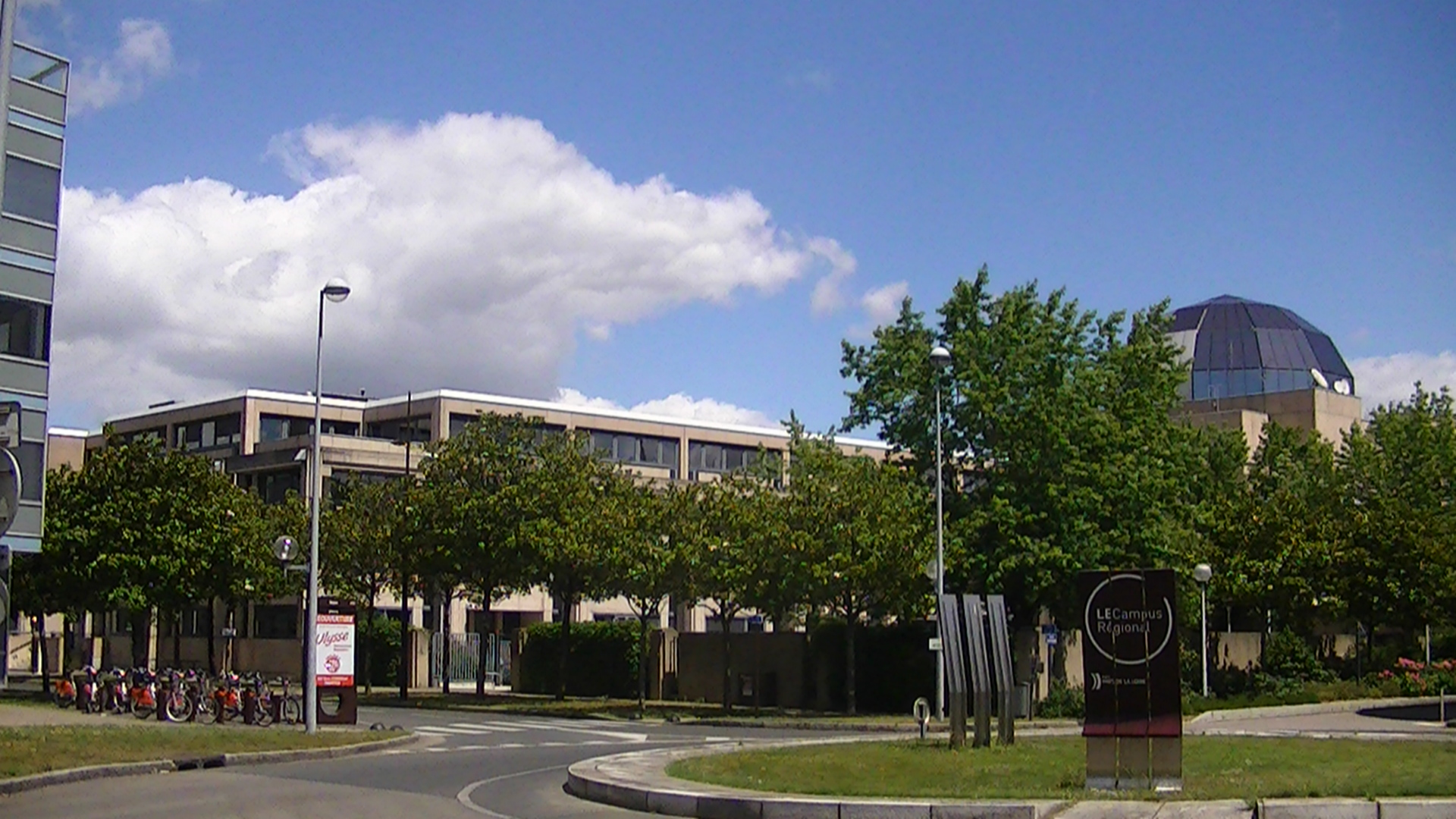
- Hôtel de Région, Nantes

The Regional Council of Pays de la Loire is the deliberative assembly of the French region of Pays de la Loire. The regional council is made up of 93 regional councilors elected for a period of six years by direct universal suffrage and chaired by Christelle Morançais (LR) since 2017. It sits in Nantes, at the Hôtel de Région.

The seats in this region are divided by department:

- 35 councillors for Loire-Atlantique
- 19 councillors for Maine-et-Loire
- 17 councillors for the Vendée
- 15 councillors for Sarthe
- 7 councillors for Mayenne

== Current Regional Council ==
The current council was elected in June 2021 for a term of office until 2028.

=== Composition ===
Distribution of seats in the council (by list)
Party	List	Led by	Seats obtained
LR	Union of the right and the center	Christelle Morançais	57
LC	Union of the right and the center	Christelle Morançais	57
UDI	Union of the right and the center	Christelle Morançais	57
DVD	Union of the right and the center	Christelle Morançais	57
PS	Union of Ecologists and the Left	Matthieu Orphelin	24
PCF	Union of Ecologists and the Left	Matthieu Orphelin	24
PP	Union of Ecologists and the Left	Matthieu Orphelin	24
EELV	Union of Ecologists and the Left	Matthieu Orphelin	24
LFI	Union of Ecologists and the Left	Matthieu Orphelin	24
DVG	Union of Ecologists and the Left	Matthieu Orphelin	24
EXD	National Rally and allies	Hervé Juvin	7
RN	National Rally and allies	Hervé Juvin	7
LREM	Union of Centre	François de Rugy	5
MoDem	Union of Centre	François de Rugy	5

Following the installation session of the July 2, 2021, the regional council is chaired by Christelle Morançais.

=== Vice-presidents ===
List of vice-presidents
Order	Name
1st	Antoine Chéreau
2nd	Franck Louvrier
3rd	Lydie Bernard
4th	Isabelle Leroy
5th	André Martin
6th	Laurent Dejoie
7th	Roch Brancour
8th	Philippe Henry
9th	Sandra Impériale
10th	Eric Grelier
11th	Claire Hugues
12th	Jean-Luc Catanzaro
13th	Constance Nebbula
14th	Samia Soultani-Vigneron
15th	Barbara Nourry

== Former compositions ==
=== Presidents ===
President	Party	Term
Vincent Ansquer	RPR	1974
Olivier Guichard	RPR	1974 - 1998
Francois Fillon	RPR	1998 - 2002
Jean-Luc Harousseau	UMP	2002 - 2004
Jacques Auxiette	PS	2004 - 2015
Bruno Retailleau	LR	2015 - 2017
Christelle Morançais	LR	2017-

=== From 1986 to 1992 ===
- 49 of the RPR - UDF
- 31 of the PS
- 5 of the PCF
- 3 of the DVG
- 3 of the RN
- 2 of the DVD

The president of the regional council was Olivier Guichard (RPR).

=== From 1992 to 1998 ===
- 48 of the UPF
- 18 of the MRG - PS
- 8 of the RN
- 7 of the Verts
- 7 of the Ecology Generation
- 4 of the Far-Left
- 1 of the CPNT

The president of the regional council was Olivier Guichard (UPF).

=== From 1998 to 2004 ===
- 50 of the Union of the Right
- 32 of the Union of the Left
- 7 of the Extreme Right
- 3 of the CPNT
- 1 of the Extreme Left

The president of the regional council was François Fillon (RPR) until 2002 (resigned following his appointment to the government), then Jean-Luc Harousseau (UMP).

=== From 2004 to 2010 ===
- Group of Socialists and Radical and Miscellaneous Left: 39 elected
- Group of the Union of Loire Valley: 26 elected
- Group of The Greens: 13 elected
- Group of Communists: 8 elected
- Group of Centrists: 7 elected

The president was Jacques Auxiette (PS).

=== From 2010 to 2015 ===
- Group of Socialists and Radical and Miscellaneous Left: 38 elected
- Group of Union of Pays de la Loire: 19 elected
- Group of The Greens: 17 elected
- Group of Communists: 5 elected
- Centrist Alliance Group: 4 elected
- Group Movement for France: 4 elected
- Ecology Solidarity Group: 3 elected
- New Center Group: 3 elected

The president was Jacques Auxiette.

=== From 2015 to 2021 ===
- Group of Republicans and Related: 37 elected
- Socialist, Ecologist, Radical and Republican Group: 17 elected
- Union of the Group of Centrists: 17 elected
- National Front Group - Navy Blue Rally: 8 elected (13 at the start of their term of office)
- Ecologist and Citizen Group: 6 elected
- Alliance Group for the Pays de la Loire: 5 elected
- LREM: 3 elected

The president of the Council was Bruno Retailleau.
