= Franck Louvrier =

French politician (born 1968)

Mayor of La Baule-Escoublac
- Incumbent
- Assumed office 5 July 2020
- Preceded by: Yves Métaireau

Personal details
- Born: 30 May 1968 (age 57)
- Party: The Republicans (since 2015)

Franck Louvrier (born 30 May 1968) is a French politician serving as mayor of La Baule-Escoublac since 2020. He is a member of the Regional Council of Pays de la Loire and serves as 2nd vice president. In the 2017 legislative election, he was a candidate for Loire-Atlantique's 7th constituency. From 2007 to 2012, he served as communications advisor to president Nicolas Sarkozy.
