= Vanessa Miranville =

French politician

Mayor of La Possession
- Incumbent
- Assumed office 4 April 2014
- Preceded by: Roland Robert

Personal details
- Born: 26 July 1983 (age 42) La Possession, Réunion
- Party: Europe Ecology – The Greens (until 2011); Possession Écologie Solidaire (2011–2015); Citoyens de La Réunion en Action (2015– )
- Profession: Teacher

Vanessa Miranville (born 26 July 1983) is a French politician who has held office as the mayor of La Possession in Réunion since 2014. She is involved in green politics and advocates for more ecologically responsible management of household waste.

== Biography ==
=== Education ===
Miranville studied in Toulouse and Paris, and in 2004 she obtained her qualifications to teach mathematics for higher education. She graduated first place in the competition to earn her teacher's Agrégation and began teaching at the Collège Raymond-Vergès in her hometown of La Possession.

=== Career ===
From a young age, Miranville was involved in the Green movement in Toulouse. At the age of twenty, she also became involved with Greenpeace and the World Wide Fund for Nature. After completing her education, she returned to Réunion she joined the environmentalist party Europe Écologie Les Verts (EELV). She began working on the problem of household waste, co-founding a recycling organization called Recyclali. She became EELV's spokesperson on the island of Réunion and was offered second place on their ballot in the 2010 regional elections.

In the 2011 French cantonal elections, Miranville ran in the canton of La Possession. She gained 26.1% of the vote but lost to outgoing general councilor Roland Robert who won the election in the first round with 57.5% of the vote. That same year, she left EELV and formed her own political party, Possession Écologie Solidaire (PES). In this new party, she ran in the 2014 municipal elections for mayor of La Possession. Running another time against Roland Robert, she secured 56.5% of the vote and defeated her opponent, becoming the first female mayor in Réunion.

After taking office, she was also elected to be a vice president of the Territoire de la Côte Ouest, an agglomeration community which encompasses La Possession and four other cantons. In 2015, her party became Citoyens de La Réunion en Action (CREA). She was a candidate in the 2017 Senate election to represent Réunion, but the list which she was on garnered just 2.3% of the vote. In the 2020 municipal elections, Miranville's party won the first round with 45.2% of the vote and the second round with 64.8% of the vote on 28 June 2020. On 3 July, she was re-elected as mayor of La Possession.

In August 2020, Miranville announced her candidacy in the 2021 regional elections in Réunion. Her platform for the election focused on ecological concerns and participatory democracy, and specific campaign promises included revising dock dues, increasing public housing, and receiving citizen feedback on the future of the Nouvelle route du Littoral, a new coastal road which would connect La Possession with Saint-Denis. She achieved fourth place, narrowly failing to move on in the second round with 9.9% of the vote.
