= Andréa Kotarac =

French politician

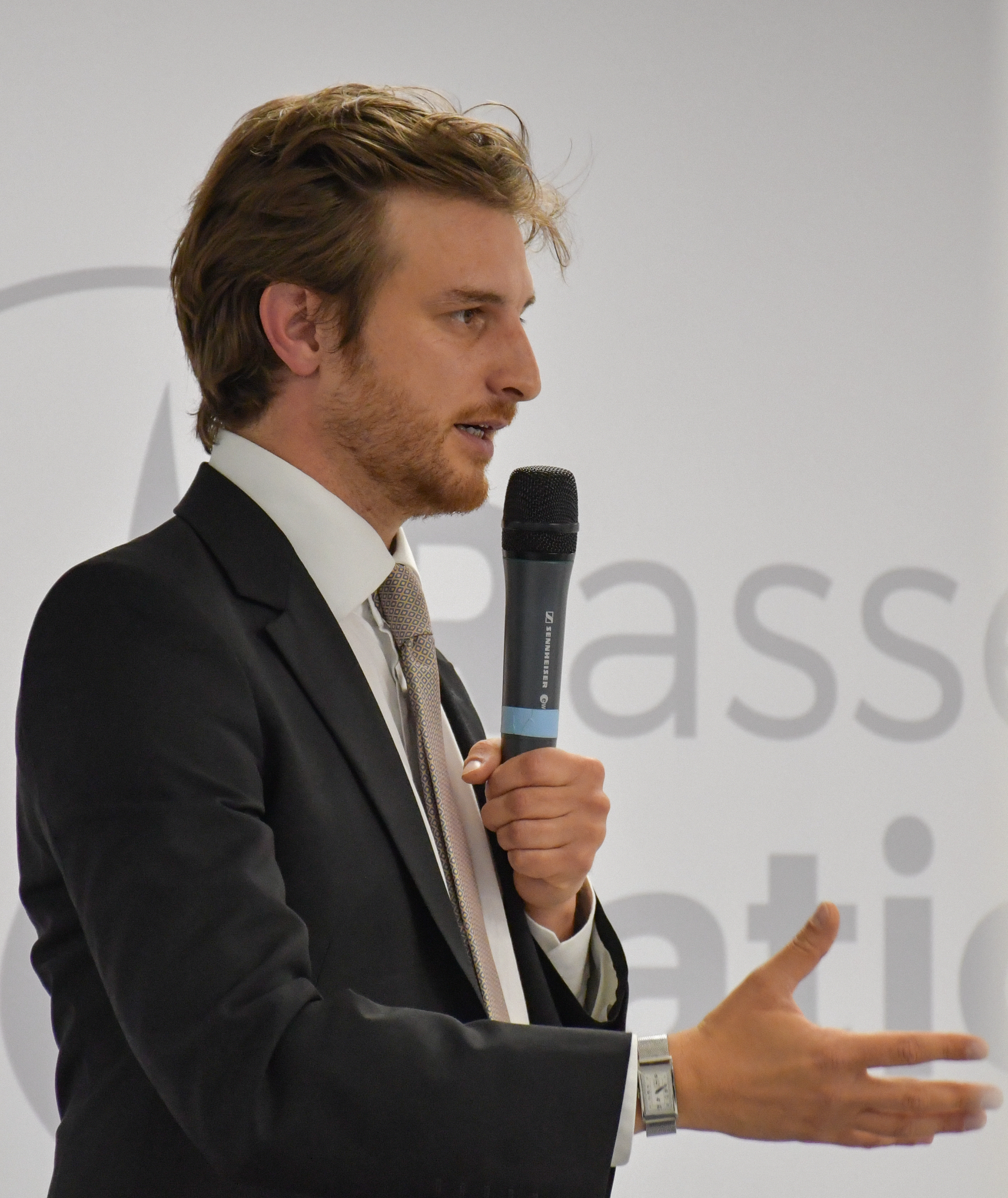
- Kotarac in 2023

Member of the Regional Council of Auvergne-Rhône-Alpes
- Incumbent
- Assumed office 2 July 2021
- President: Laurent Wauquiez
- Constituency: Metropolis of Lyon
- In office 4 January 2016 – 15 September 2019
- President: Laurent Wauquiez
- Constituency: Metropolis of Lyon

Personal details
- Born: Andréa Nicolás Maxime Kotarac; 7 May 1989 (age 37) Thonon-les-Bains, France
- Party: RN (since 2021)
- Other political affiliations: PS (2008); PG (2009–2019); LFI (2016–2019)

Andréa Nicolás Maxime Kotarac (born 7 May 1989) is a French politician. He has served as a councilor from the National Rally (RN) list in the Auvergne-Rhône-Alpes regional council since July 2021. He was previously a member of the regional council for the Left Party (PG)/La France Insoumise (LFI) from January 2016 to September 2019.

== Early life ==
Andréa Kotarac was born in Thonon-les-Bains, Haute-Savoie. His father, a Serbian, was an activist in the General Confederation of Labour trade union and his mother is Iranian.

== Political career ==
=== From Socialist Party to Left Party ===
Kotarac was an unsuccessful candidate running on a left-wing electoral list led by the Socialist Party (PS) in his hometown of Thonon-les-Bains in the 2008 municipal elections at the age of 19. The following year, he met Jean-Luc Mélenchon and began participating in Pour la République sociale, the predecessor organisation of the Left Party which he would joined upon its founding in 2009.

In 2012, Kotarac was arrested along with two other Left Front activists after getting into a violent confrontation with far-right sympathisers near Jean Moulin University Lyon 3. By this point, he was the co-leader of the Left Front's youth movement.

He led the Left Front electoral list in the 8th arrondissement of Lyon in the 2014 municipal elections, and the Left Party-Europe Ecology – The Greens (PG-EELV) electoral list in the first round of the 2015 regional elections in Auvergne-Rhône-Alpes before forming a united left-wing list with the Socialist Party and Citizen and Republican Movement under Jean-Jack Queyranne in the second round. He sat in the Rassemblement citoyen écologiste & solidaire (RCES) group in the Auvgerne-Rhône-Alpes regional council after his election.

He was heavily involved in Mélenchon's campaign in the 2017 presidential election and ran as a La France Insoumise (LFI) candidate in Rhône's 7th constituency in that year's legislative election, coming in third with 13.3% of the vote in the first round of voting.

=== Aligning with the National Rally ===
In May, Kotarac announced ahead of the 2019 European Parliament election in France that he would be voting for the National Rally, justifying his decision as "a call to vote for the only souverainiste list, which puts forward the independence of France and which is best able to block Emmanuel Macron and his anti-social steamroller". In response, he was expelled from the Left Party and excluded from the RECES group, with Mélenchon calling him to respect voters by resigning as regional councilor.

In September 2019, he became the parliamentary assistant to Hervé Juvin, a member of the European Parliament elected on the National Rally list.

Kotarac headed the National Rally-Christian Democratic Party (RN-PCD) electoral list for the 2020 metropolitan council election of Lyon. The list garnered 7.7% of the vote in the first round and failed to win any seats.

In 2021, Kotarac and Juvin, neither of whom were members of National Rally despite their association with the party, founded the Localist Party (Les Localistes) ahead of the 2021 regional elections, espousing green politics and identitarian localism.

Selected over fellow contenders Alexis Jolly and Isabelle Surply, Kotarac headed the National Rally electoral list for the 2021 regional election in Auvergne-Rhône-Alpes. He faced opposition from some of the party's leadership, who considered him too close to Marion Maréchal, the niece and rival of National Rally leader Marine Le Pen. The National Rally did poorly compared to 2015, coming in third place in the first and second rounds of voting, garnering just 12.3% and 11.2% of the vote respectively, and losing 17 seats.

Kotarac was included in the National Rally party list for the 2024 European Parliament election in France at the 35th place but failed to be elected as the National Rally won 30 seats.

He was the National Rally candidate in Ain's 2nd constituency for the 2024 snap legislative election, coming first in the first round of voting with 39.2% of the vote, resulting in a "triangular" runoff with the Ensemble Citoyens and New Popular Front candidates who came in second and third respectively. Kotarac lost the second round after the New Popular Front candidate withdrew in favour of the Ensemble Citoyens candidate, who won 55.1% of the vote.
