= Roland Robert =

French politician (1937–2014)

Mayor for La Possession
- In office 1971–2014

Councillor of the Departement of Réunion
- Incumbent
- Assumed office 1973

Personal details
- Born: 5 March 1937
- Died: 29 April 2014 (aged 76)
- Political party: Communist Party of Réunion

Roland Robert (5 March 1937 – 29 April 2014) was a Réunionese politician. He became mayor of La Possession in 1971 and general councillor of La Réunion in 1973.
