= Josette Borel-Lincertin =

French politician from Guadeloupe

President of Departmental Council of Guadeloupe
- In office 5 April 2015 – 1 July 2021
- Preceded by: Jacques Gillot
- Succeeded by: Guy Losbar

President of Regional Council of Guadeloupe
- In office 3 August 2012 – 12 April 2014
- Preceded by: Victorin Lurel
- Succeeded by: Victorin Lurel

Personal details
- Born: 12 August 1941 (age 84) Capesterre-de-Marie-Galante, Guadeloupe
- Party: Socialist Party

Josette Borel-Lincertin (born 12 August 1941), is a French politician from Guadeloupe. She served as president of the regional council of Guadeloupe from 2012 to 2014 and president of the departmental council from 2015 to 2021.

== Early and professional career ==
Josette Claire Lincertin was born on 12 August 1941 on the island of Marie-Galante, in the commune of Capesterre-de-Marie-Galante (in the south of the island). Her mother was a baker and she brought up a family of four children with benevolent authority. First educated in Marie-Galante, she left her island for Guadeloupe to continue her education.

After her baccalaureate, Borel-Lincertin went to study in Paris and returned in 1964, aged 22, to begin a teaching career that would last 40 years. She taught mathematics for 18 years before becoming head of establishment in several academies. She was initially assigned as principal of the college of Pointe-Noire, in the north of Basse-Terre, in Guadeloupe. In 1986, she was appointed professor at Académie d'Amiens. She then became a principal, and ended her career at Lycée Gerville-Réache in Basse-Terre in 2004.
