= Pays de la Loire =

Administrative region of France

Pays de la Loire Paeiz de la Leirr (Gallo) Paes de la Loere (Poitevin–Saintongeais) Broioù al Liger (Breton)
- Region
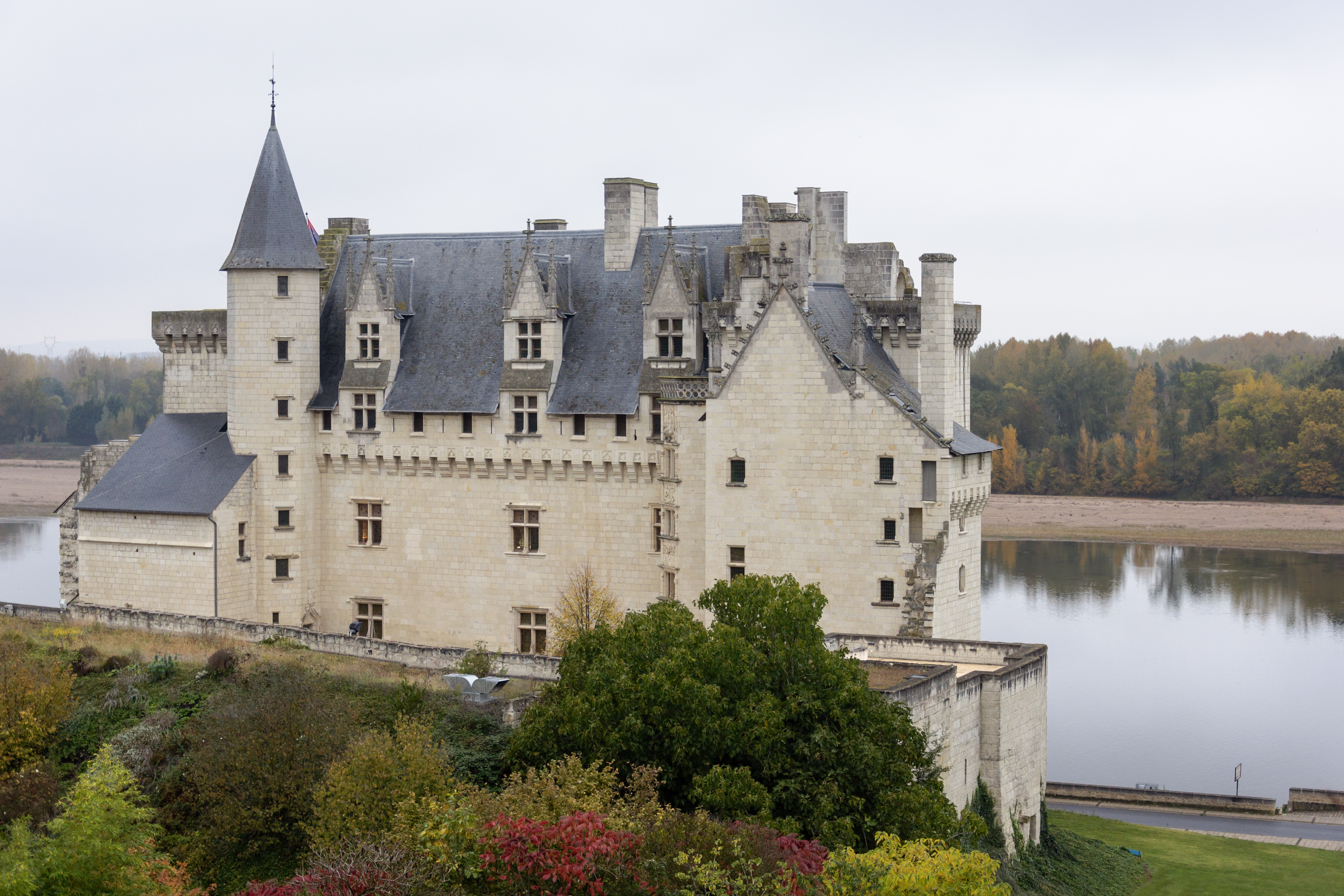
- Château de Montsoreau

- Brandmark

- Coordinates: 47°25′03″N 00°51′18″W
- Country: France
- Prefecture: Nantes
- Departments: 5: Loire-Atlantique (44); Maine-et-Loire (49); Mayenne (53); Sarthe (72); Vendée (85)

Government
  - President of the Regional Council: Christelle Morançais (DVD)

Area
  - Total: 32,082 km^{2} (12,387 sq mi)
  - Rank: 8th

Population (2023)
  - Total: 3,907,156
  - Density: 121.79/km^{2} (315.43/sq mi)

GDP
  - Total: €147.791 billion (2024)
  - Per capita: €37,463 (2024)
- Time zone: UTC+01:00 (CET)
  - Summer (DST): UTC+02:00 (CEST)
- ISO 3166 code: FR-PDL
- NUTS Region: FR5
- Website: www.paysdelaloire.fr

Pays de la Loire (French pronunciation: [pe.i d(ə) la lwaʁ]; Breton: Broioù al Liger, lit. 'Lands of the Loire') is one of the eighteen administrative regions of France, located on the country's Atlantic coast. It was created in the 1950s to serve as a zone of influence for its capital and most populated city, Nantes, one of a handful of French "balancing metropolises" (métropoles d'équilibre). (Note: In the 1960s under the presidency of Charles de Gaulle, eight large regional cities of France (Lille, Nancy, Strasbourg, Lyon, Nantes, Bordeaux, Marseille, Toulouse) were made "balancing metropolises", receiving special financial and technical help from the national government in order to counterbalance the excessive weight of Paris inside France.) In 2020, Pays de la Loire had a population of 3,832,120.

== Geography ==
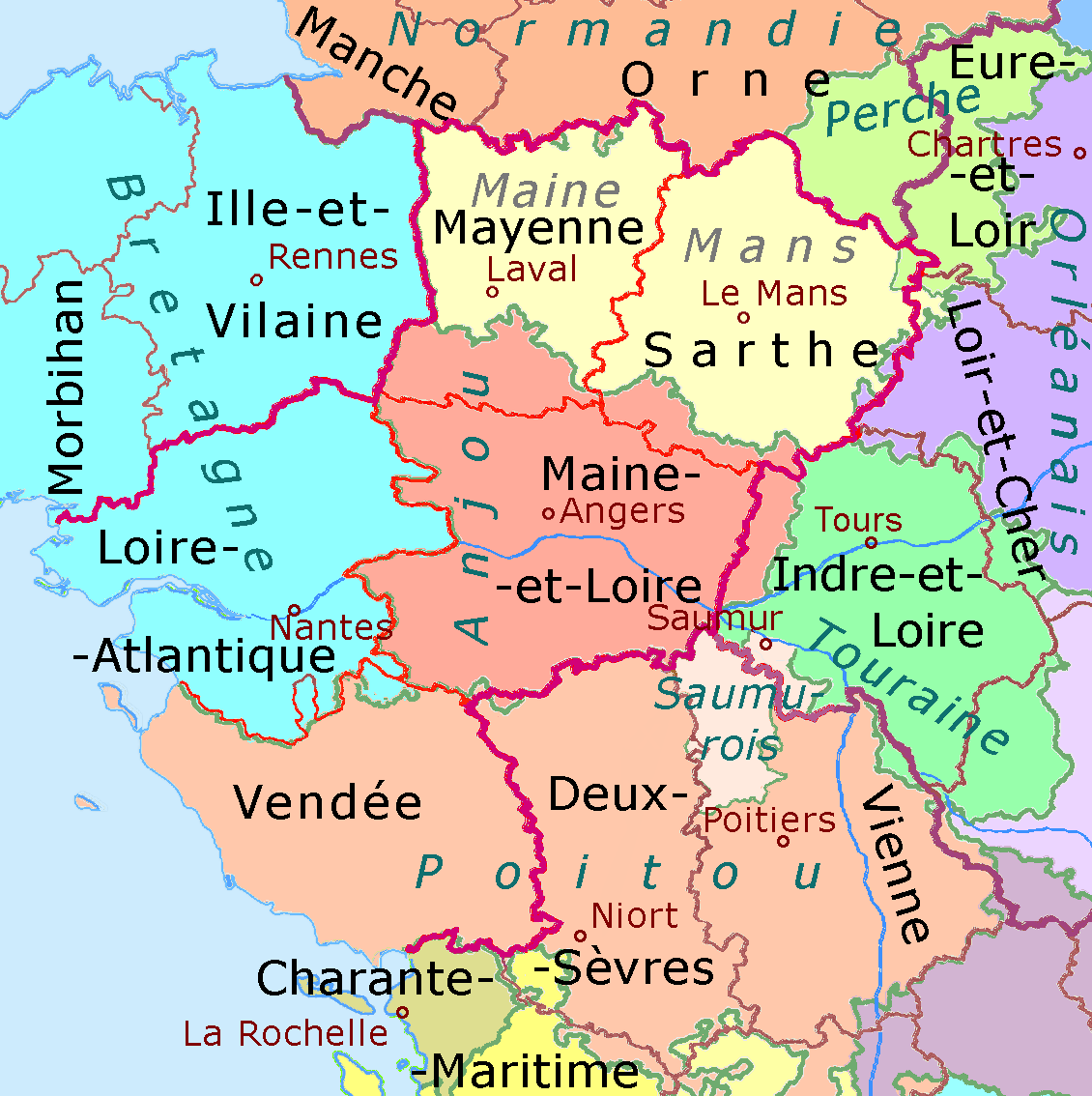
The region Pays de la Loire and its departments on the background of historical provinces

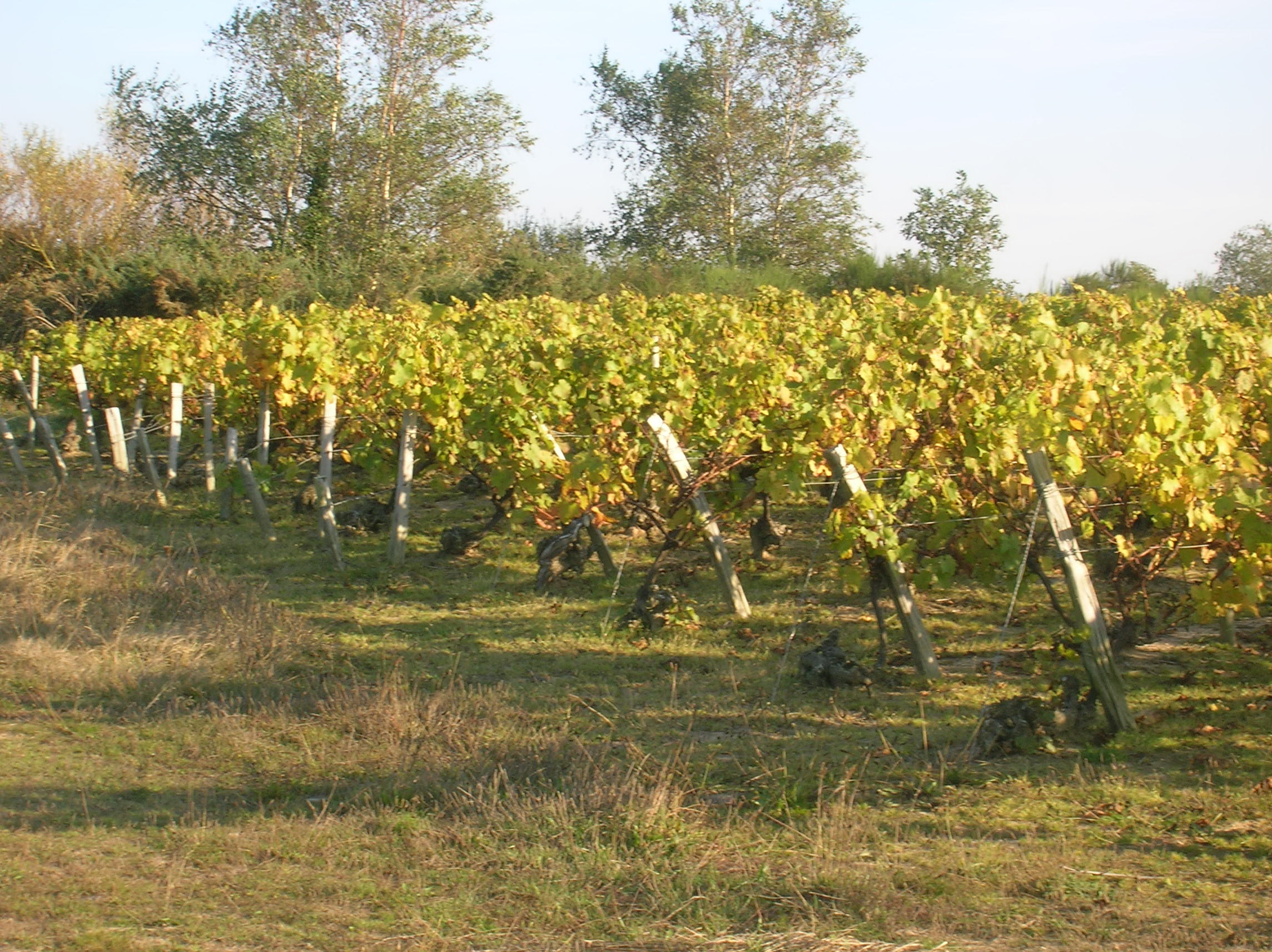
A vineyard in Brem, Pays de la Loire

Pays de la Loire is in western France, bordered by Brittany on the northwest, Normandy on the north, Centre-Val de Loire on the east, Nouvelle-Aquitaine on the south, and the Bay of Biscay of the North Atlantic Ocean on the southwest.

=== Departments and former province ===
Pays de la Loire comprises five departments: Loire-Atlantique, Maine-et-Loire, Mayenne, Sarthe, Vendée.

Pays de la Loire is made up of the following historical provinces:

- Part of Brittany, with its old capital Nantes contained within the Loire-Atlantique department. This is up to 20% of historical Brittany. The other 80% makes up the currently neighbouring region of Brittany
- Anjou: is largely absorbed into the Maine-et-Loire department; the rest in the immediately adjoining departments (the whole of the historical province Anjou is contained inside Pays de la Loire).
- Maine: is now divided between the Mayenne and Sarthe departments; the whole of the former province of Maine is contained inside Pays de la Loire.
- Part of Poitou: is contained within the Vendée department; most of the old province of Poitou is inside the Nouvelle-Aquitaine region to the south.
- Part of Perche: is within the northeast of Sarthe department; the rest of Perche is inside the Normandy and Centre-Val de Loire regions.
- Small part of Touraine: southeast of Maine-et-Loire department; the rest, most of the former province of Touraine is inside the Centre region.

Thus the name of the region, chosen by the French central government, was not based on history, but a postwar creation of purely geographical reference: Pays ("lands") de la Loire ("of the Loire").

The Loire Valley, which is a UNESCO listed World Heritage Site since 2000, is located both in the administrative regions of Pays de la Loire and Centre-Val de Loire. The majority of the châteaux of the Loire Valley such as Montsoreau, Angers, Saumur or Brézé in Pays de la Loire are located in the Maine-et-Loire department, Pays de la Loire has numerous prominent monuments, such as the castles of Laval, and the Nantes Château des Ducs de Bretagne, the Royal Fontevraud Abbey (the widest monastic ensemble in Europe), and the old city of Le Mans. It also has many natural parks such as the Brière and the Marsh of Poitou.

== Demography ==
Evolution of the population listed by departments:

Year	Population of the departments					
Year	Loire-Atlantique department	Maine-et-Loire department	Mayenne department	Sarthe department	Vendée department	Total Pays de la Loire
1801	369,305	375,544	305,654	388,143	243,426	1,682,072
1851	535,664	516,197	374,566	473,071	383,734	2,283,232
1901	664,971	515,431	313,103	422,699	441,311	2,357,515
1921	649,691	475,485			397,292	2,174,150
1936	659,428	478,404	251,348	388,519	389,211	2,166,910
1946	665,064				393,787	2,224,163
1954	733,575				395,641	2,320,177
1962	803,372	535,122	250,030	443,019	408,928	2,440,471
1968	861,452	585,563	252,762	461,839	421,250	2,582,866
1975	934,499	629,849	261,789	490,385	450,641	2,767,163
1982	995,498	675,321	271,784	504,768	483,027	2,930,398
1990	1,050,539	704,668	277,748	513,280	508,962	3,055,197
2005	1,208,761	754,997	297,854	551,971	587,162	3,400,745

A steep increase in the population was seen particularly as people migrated from all over France to the Loire region due to the rise of Nantes to prominence.

== Economy ==
The gross domestic product (GDP) of the region was €119.1 billion in 2018, accounting for 5.1% of French economic output. GDP per capita adjusted for purchasing power was €28,200 or 94% of the EU27 average in the same year. The GDP per employee was 102% of the EU average.

== Transport ==
The region's main airport is Nantes Atlantique Airport which provides most domestic and international destinations.

== Major communities ==
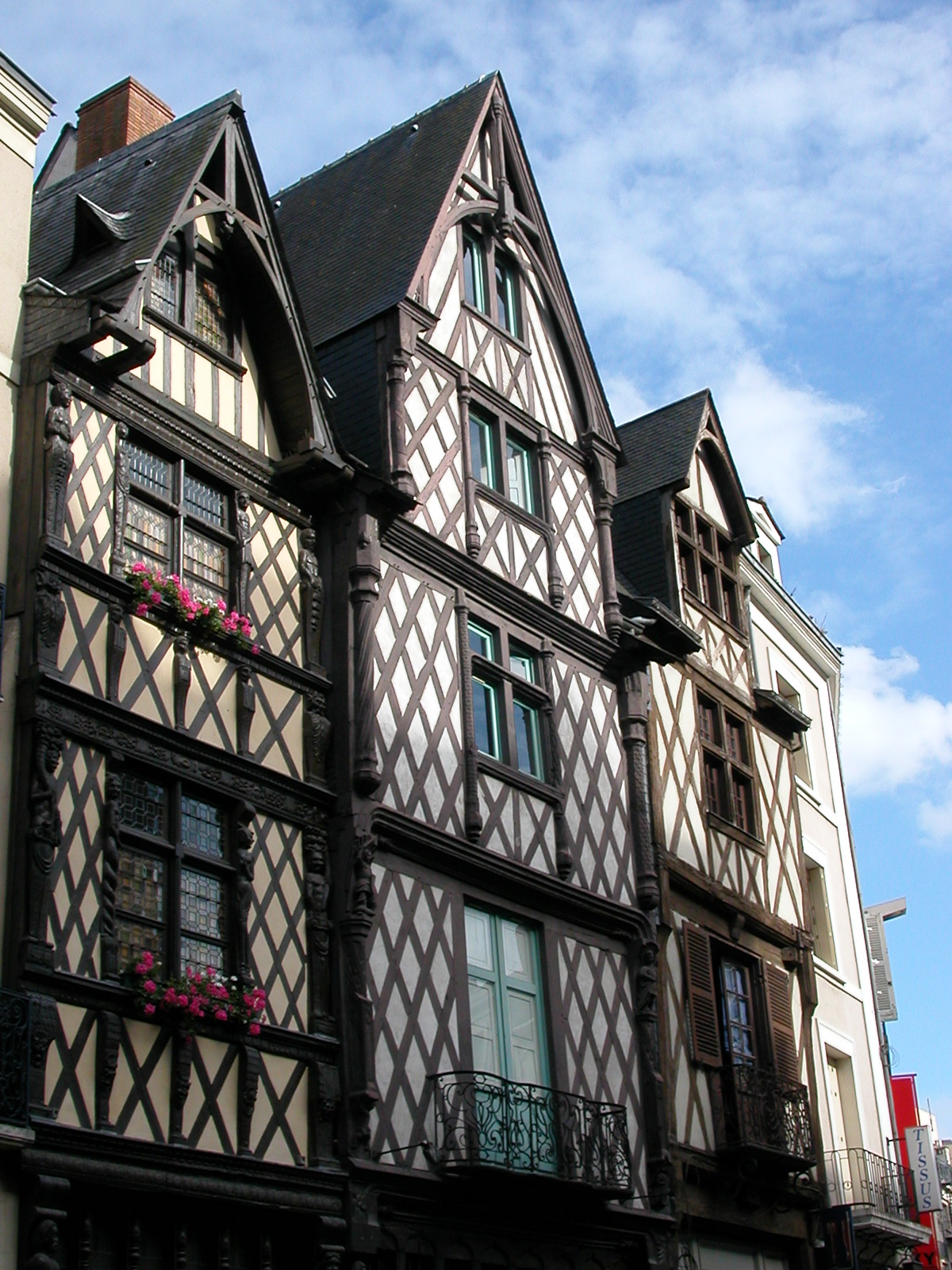
Half-timbered houses in Angers

The biggest city in Pays de la Loire is Nantes, which is the sixth most populated city in France with over 319,000 people (city proper) and a metropolitan population of almost 1,000,000.

Angers is another metropolis of the region. It has a metropolitan population of about 400,000 and is the third biggest job provider in north-western France, just behind Nantes and Rennes. Saint-Nazaire is a major harbour town downstream from Nantes on the mouth of the Loire river.

Le Mans is another city in Pays de la Loire. Situated in north-east Pays de la Loire, Le Mans area is home to over 300,000 (metropolitan population).

- Nantes
- Angers
- Le Mans
- La Roche-sur-Yon
- Cholet
- Saint-Nazaire
- Laval

== See also ==
- Saint-Paulin cheese, another Trappist cheese from France
- Château de Montsoreau-Museum of Contemporary Art, featuring the Philippe Méaille Collection, the largest radical conceptual art collection of the Art & Language movement.
- Montsoreau Flea Market, the largest flea market in the Loire Valley, every second Sunday of the month.
- Regional Council of Pays de la Loire, deliberative assembly of the region
- Jublains archeological site
- Place Saint-Pierre, Nantes
