= Gilles Pennelle =

French politician and teacher

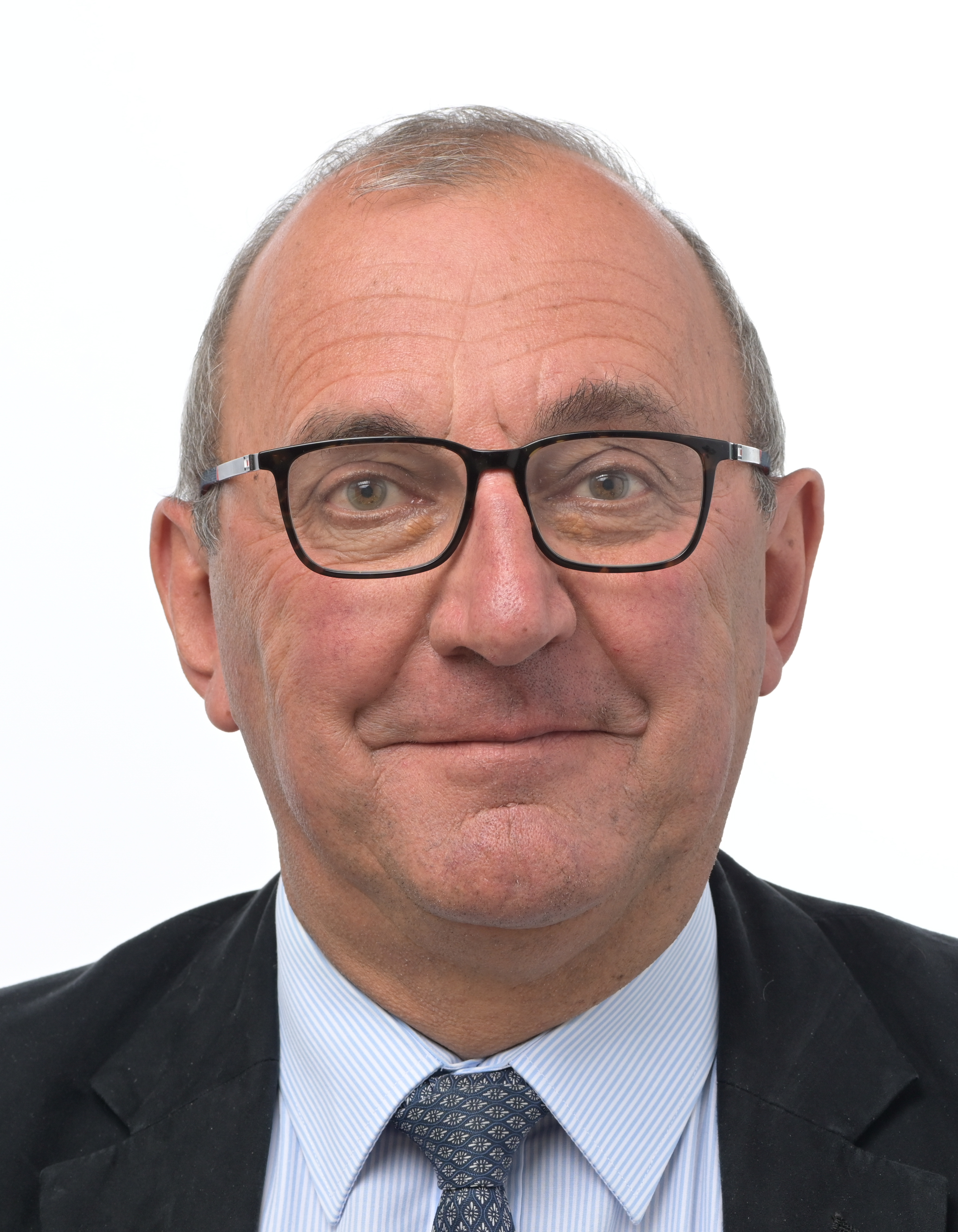
- President: Marine Le Pen

Personal details
- Born: July 20, 1962 (age 64) Dieppe
- Party: National Rally
- Education: University of Rouen Normandy

Gilles Pennelle (French pronunciation: [ʒil pɛnɛl]; born on 20 July 1962) is a French politician and teacher. He was elected as a Member of the European Parliament in 2024.

== Biography ==
Gilles Pennelle was born in Dieppe.

He is a professor of history and geography. He joined the FN in 1987. He was a municipal councillor from 1989 to 2001, then a regional councillor from 1992 to 2004.

In 2018, at the XVIth Congress of the National Front, he was elected to the National Council of the Party in 16th position.

Regional pooling in France (Bretagne area) June 2021: Jewish activists at the RN alert against candidates with a "sulfurous" past such as Gilles Pennelle source https://www.sudouest.fr/elections/regionales/regionales-des-militants-juifs-au-rn-alertent-contre-des-candidats-au-passe-sulfureux-3501878.amp.html—Faure Nicolas Emile (talk) 20:27, 31 May 2021 (UTC)
