= Loïg Chesnais-Girard =

French politician

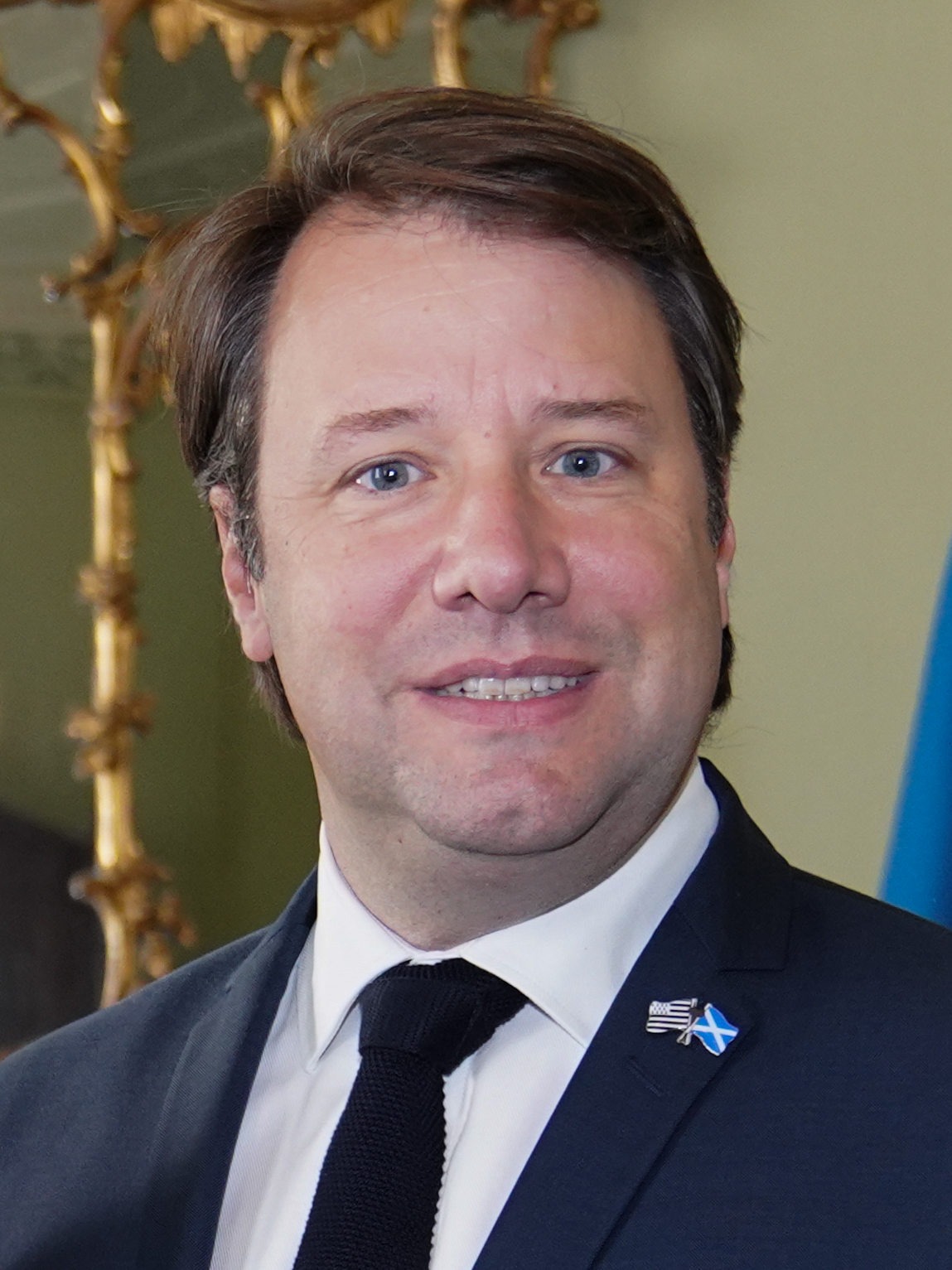
- Girard in 2024.

President of Regional Council of Brittany
- Incumbent
- Assumed office 22 June 2017
- Preceded by: Jean-Yves Le Drian

Mayor of Liffré
- In office 15 March 2008 – 22 June 2017
- Preceded by: Clément Théaudin
- Succeeded by: Guillaume Bégué

Personal details
- Born: 25 March 1977 (age 49) Lannion, France
- Party: PS (1997-2022)
- Education: University of Rennes

Loïg Chesnais-Girard (French pronunciation: [lɔiɡ ʃɛnɛ ʒiʁaʁ]; born 25 March 1977) is a French politician. A former member of the Socialist Party, he was mayor of Liffré from 2008 to 2017 and is the current President of the Regional Council of Brittany since 2017.
