= Aleksandar Nikolic (politician) =

French politician

Aleksandar Nikolic MEP
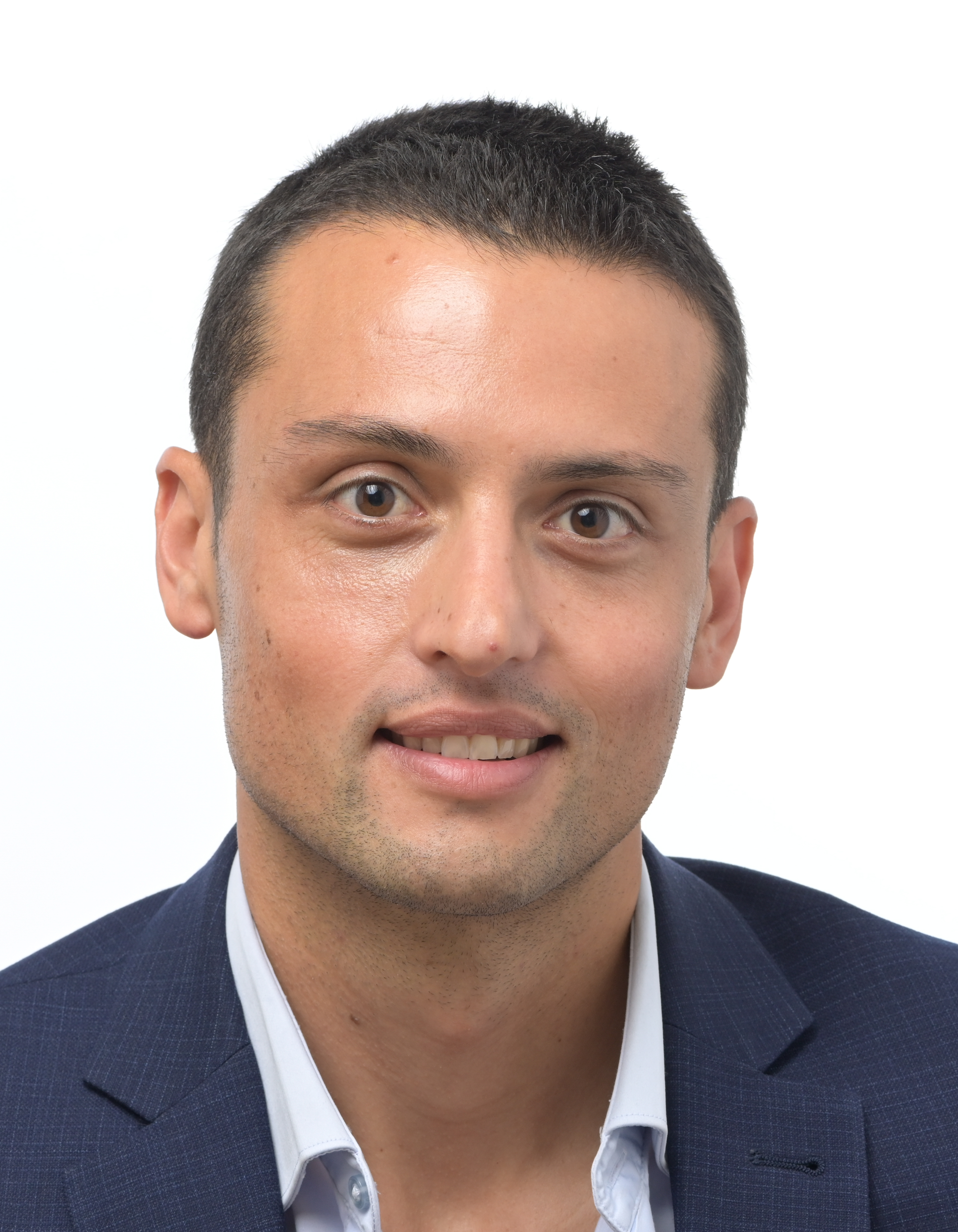

Member of the European Parliament for France
- Incumbent
- Assumed office 16 July 2024

Member of the Regional Council of Centre-Val de Loire
- Incumbent
- Assumed office 2 July 2021

Personal details
- Born: 4 October 1986 (age 39) La Garenne-Colombes, France
- Party: National Rally

Aleksandar Nikolic (French pronunciation: [alɛksɑ̃daʁ nikɔlitʃ]; born 4 October 1986) is a French politician for the National Rally party. He was elected to the European Parliament in the 2024 election and assumed office on 16 July 2024.

== Personal life ==
Nikolic's mother is Portuguese and his father Serbian. He was born in La Garenne-Colombes.
