= The Popular Right =

The Popular Right La Droite populaire
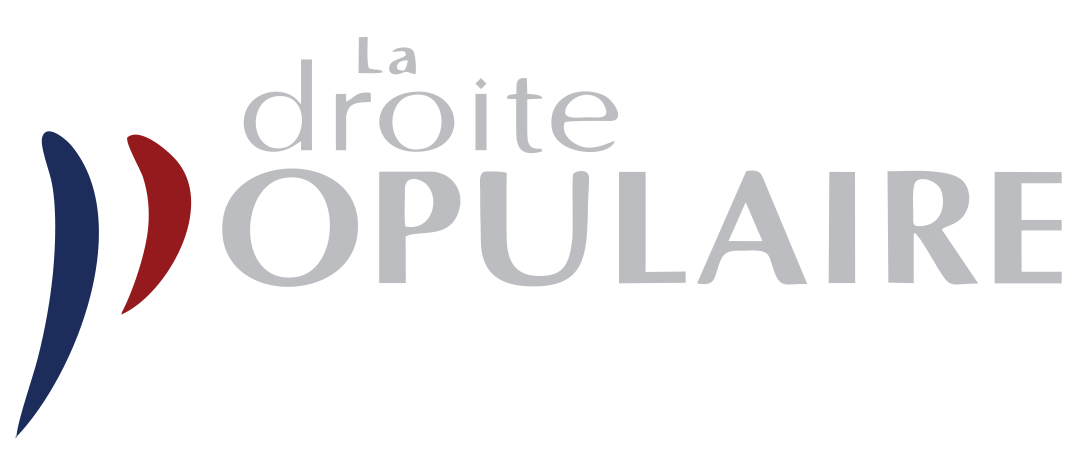
- Leader: Thierry Mariani
- Founder: Thierry Mariani, Lionnel Luca, Richard Mallié, Jean-Paul Garraud, Philippe Meunier, Jacques Myard
- Founded: 14 July 2010
- Ideology: Sovereigntism; Euroscepticism; Anti-immigration; Social conservatism Right-wing populism
- Political position: Right-wing to far-right
- National affiliation: Union for a Popular Movement (2010–2015); The Republicans (2015–2019); National Rally (since 2019)
- Colours: Navy blue
- European Parliament: 2 / 79

Website
- droitepopulaire.fr

The Popular Right (French: La Droite populaire, commonly known as La Droite pop) is a recognised movement within the National Rally (RN) since 2019, previously within the Union for a Popular Movement (UMP) and The Republicans (LR). It was founded in 2010 as the Collectif parlementaire de la Droite populaire, a caucus of UMP parliamentarians which included 26 members of the National Assembly. The Popular Right seeks to emphasise issues such as national identity, security and immigration. Its leader is Thierry Mariani, currently an MEP.

== History and ideology ==
The movement was created as an informal parliamentary caucus within the then-governing UMP in June 2010 by Lionnel Luca, Richard Mallié, Jean-Paul Garraud and Thierry Mariani - all members of the UMP's right-wing. It was later joined by other parliamentarians, most of them from the Provence-Alpes-Côte d'Azur region of southeastern France, a region where the far-right National Front is very strong.

The movement's charter focused on six themes: nation, patriotism, free enterprise, family policy, security, responsible management of public finances, and French prestige abroad. Emphasizing some of the most right-wing and law-and-order aspect of former President Nicolas Sarkozy's 2007 platform, it focused much of its actions on immigration and security. It has strongly opposed foreigners' right to vote in local elections.

It has often created controversy because of its radical positions on certain issues, for example when it asked for references to gender to be removed from school textbooks. Some of its members have also indicated their support for local alliances with the far-right National Front, raising controversy within the UMP and on the left.

The group was badly hurt by the 2012 legislative elections, after which its weight in the French National Assembly shrank from 63 to 26 deputies. 37 of its members lost reelection. As it restructured itself as a motion for the November 2012 congress, leaders such as Thierry Mariani worried about the rise of similar motions such as The Strong Right.

== Weight within the UMP ==
As a motion for the November 2012 congress, the Droite Populaire did badly, placing fifth with 10.87% of the motions vote, barely enough to qualify as a recognized movement in the UMP.

=== Members ===
Official website, list of members

==== Deputies ====
- Élie Aboud (Hérault)
- Yves Albarello (Seine-et-Marne)
- Julien Aubert (Vaucluse)
- Jean-Claude Bouchet (Vaucluse)
- Valérie Boyer (Bouches-du-Rhône)
- Gérald Darmanin (Nord)
- Jean-Pierre Decool (Nord)
- Bernard Deflesselles (Bouches-du-Rhône)
- Nicolas Dhuicq (Aube)
- Sauveur Gandolfi-Scheit (Haute-Corse)
- Franck Gilard (Eure)
- Jean-Pierre Giran (Var)
- Christophe Guilloteau (Rhône)
- Patrick Labaune (Drôme)
- Lionnel Luca (Alpes-Maritimes)
- Thierry Mariani (French citizens abroad)
- Philippe Meunier (Rhône)
- Jacques Myard (Yvelines)
- Bernard Reynès (Bouches-du-Rhône)
- Fernand Siré (Pyrénées-Orientales)
- Michel Terrot (Rhône)
- Dominique Tian (Bouches-du-Rhône)
- François Vannson (Vosges)
- Patrice Verchère (Rhône)
- Philippe Vitel (Var)
- Michel Voisin (Ain)

==== Other members ====
- Brigitte Barèges, former deputy and mayor of Montauban (Tarn-et-Garonne)
- Philippe Boënnec, former deputy and mayor of Pornic (Loire-Atlantique)
- Éric Diard, former deputy and mayor of Sausset-les-Pins (Bouches-du-Rhône)
- Maryse Joissains-Masini, former deputy and mayor of Aix-en-Provence (Bouches-du-Rhône)
- Philippe Marini, Senator (Oise)
- Richard Mallié, former deputy and mayor of Bouc-Bel-Air (Bouches-du-Rhône)
- Georges Mothron, former deputy and mayor of Argenteuil (Val-d'Oise)
- Éric Raoult, former deputy and mayor of Raincy (Seine-Saint-Denis)
- Jean Roatta, Member of the European Parliament and former deputy
- Marie-Josée Roig, mayor of Avignon Vaucluse)
- Christian Vanneste, former deputy (Nord)
