= Christelle Morançais =

French politician

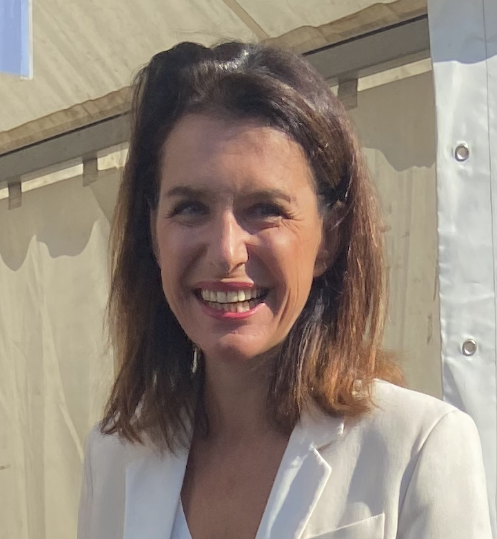

President of the Regional Council of Pays de la Loire
- Incumbent
- Assumed office 19 October 2017
- Preceded by: Bruno Retailleau

Municipal Councillor of Le Mans
- In office 4 April 2014 – 3 July 2020

Personal details
- Born: 28 January 1975 (age 51) Le Mans, France
- Party: UMP (2002-2015); LR (2015-2022); Horizons (since 2024)
- Children: 2
- Education: University of Clermont-Ferrand

Christelle Morançais (French pronunciation: [kʁistɛl mɔʁɑ̃sɛ]; born 28 January 1975) is a French politician of the Horizons party who has been serving as the Regional Council President for the Pays de la Loire region since 2017.

== Early career ==
A graduate of a business school, Morançais worked for twenty years in real estate. Together with her husband, she eventually founded the real estate company MegAgence in 2009.

== Political career ==
Morançais was a member of the Union for a Popular Movement and later the Republicans (LR) from 2015. In 2018, she was appointed to the shadow cabinet of LR leader Laurent Wauquiez. From 2019, she served as deputy chair of LR under the leadership of Christian Jacob.

In December 2021, Morançais became one of the six spokespersons for the LR candidate for the 2022 presidential election, Valérie Pécresse. After Pécresse dropped out of the race, Morançais endorsed Emmanuel Macron.

Morançais left the Republicans in late 2022 and instead joined Horizons in 2024.
