= Hervé Juvin =

French essayist and politician (born 1956)

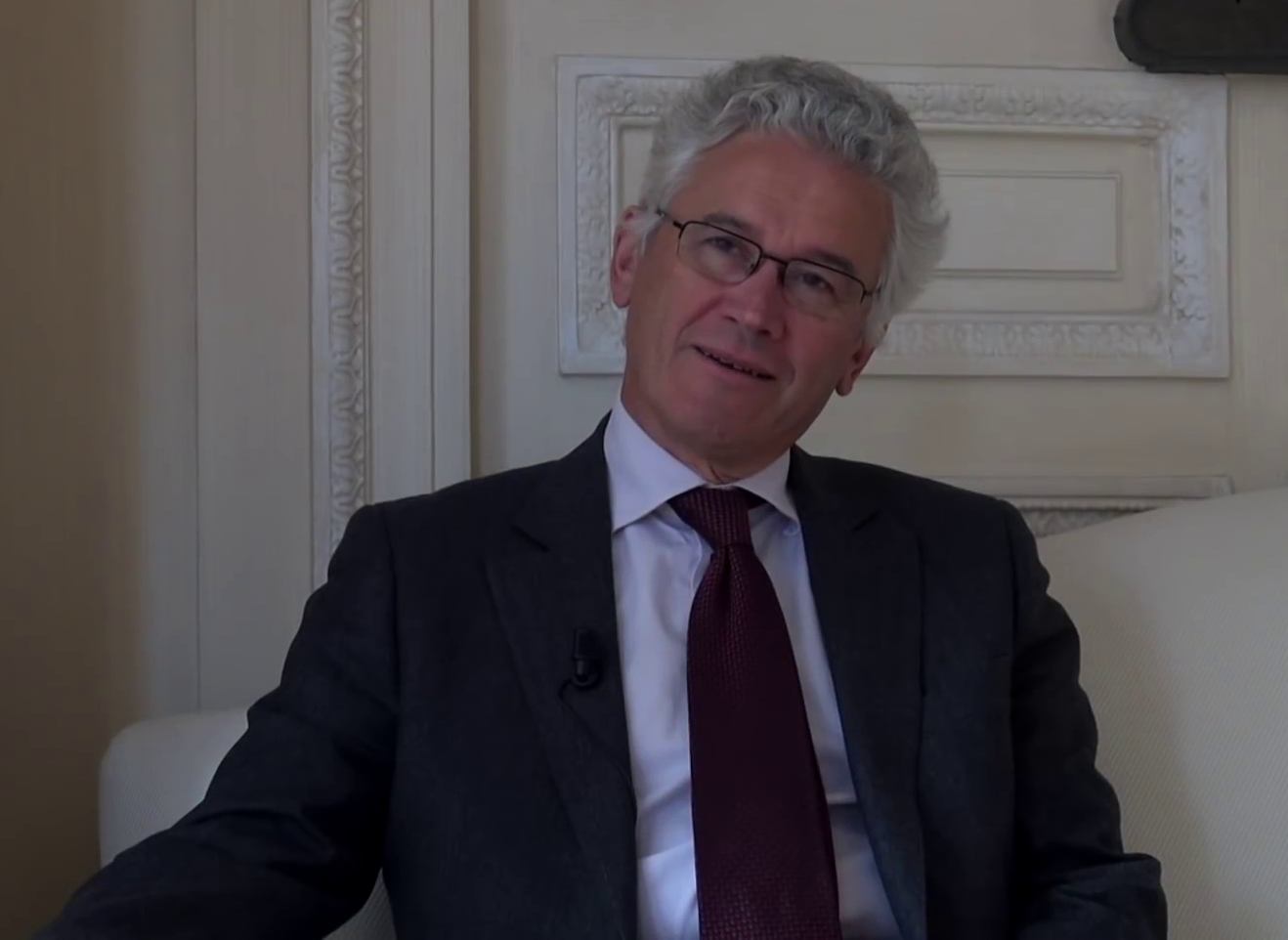
- Juvin in 2013

Member of the European Parliament
- In office 2 July 2019 – 15 July 2024
- Constituency: France

Member of the Regional Council of Pays de la Loire
- Incumbent
- Assumed office 2 July 2021

Personal details
- Born: 29 January 1956 (age 70) Malestroit, France
- Party: National Rally (affiliated until 2022); The Localists (2021-present)
- Website: hervejuvin.com

Hervé Juvin (French: [ɛʁve ʒyvɛ̃]; born 29 January 1956) is a French essayist and politician who was elected a Member of the European Parliament (MEP) on the National Rally (RN) list in 2019. He sat with Identity and Democracy (ID) until 2022, when he was expelled after being sentenced for domestic abuse.

He is author of a number of books, including The Coming of the Body, which examines the effects of longer human life spans on society and the individual.

== Environmental strategy ==
Hervé Juvin brought an environmental strategy to the National Rally party (Rassemblement National, RN). He subscribes to the Nouvelle Droite movement, a far-right French political movement often identified with neo-fascist tendencies. The European Parliament member's approach to ecology reflects the core principles of this ideology, which is why his environmental views are often associated with the ecofascist tendency.

He met with Marine Le Pen, leader of the RN at a conference in 2016 and started drafting the ideas about climate change that the party was going to embrace. The core is based on the belief in "cultural diversity and commitment to localism".

Juvin believes that safeguarding national borders is essential not only for political reasons but also for ecological reasons, as it helps to preserve the distinctiveness of human cultures and societies. He believes in the "ecology of civilizations" rooted in nativism:

"It is the diversity of animal and plant species that ensures survival. If we reduce this diversity, we expose ourselves to the risk of the disappearance of the species. I don’t see why we wouldn’t have the same thoughts about the diversity of human species."

That is related to the conservation of the biodiversity in the country and then is translated into the rejection of immigration and globalization, making an analogy with "invasive species" that can threaten "local habitats", the to-be preserved diversity, and national identity and heritage. The solution to this problem for him is to embrace national sovereignty:

"We will only respond to current ecological problems 'with states in full possession of their territory, which control the economy and their borders'.

Jauvin also stands for a conservative tendency regards to economy because he criticizes the free-trade agreements that represent the liberal and globalization currents. This relates to his view on ecology because this model leads to agglomerations of industrial and service parks, all of which are increasingly subject to regulatory capture, meaning they are being more and more influenced or controlled by the industries they are supposed to regulate.

== Bibliography ==
- Le Renversement du monde: Politique de la crise (in French). Paris: Gallimard. 2010. p. 272. ISBN 978-2-07-013051-1.
- La Grande Séparation: Pour une écologie des civilisations (in French). Paris: Gallimard. 2013. p. 400. ISBN 978-2-07-014287-3.
- Le Mur de l'Ouest n'est pas tombé: Les idées qui ont pris le pouvoir et comment le reprendre (in French). Paris: Pierre-Guillaume de Roux. 2015. p. 288. ISBN 978-2-36371-128-1.
- Le Gouvernement du désir (in French). Paris: Gallimard. 2016. p. 288. ISBN 978-2-07-269723-4.
- France, le moment politique. Pour que la France vive !, Éditions du Rocher, 2018, 285 p.
- Pourquoi combattre ?, directed by Pierre-Yves Rougeyron, Éditions Perspectives Libres, Paris, Janvier 2019.
