= Corsica =

Island and administrative region of France

Collectivity of Corsica Collectivité de Corse (French) Cullettività di a Corsica (Corsican) Collettività della Corsica (Italian)
- Region and single territorial collectivity
- Flag Coat of arms
- Anthem: (unofficial); Italian: "Dio vi salvi Regina"; English: "God Save You Queen"
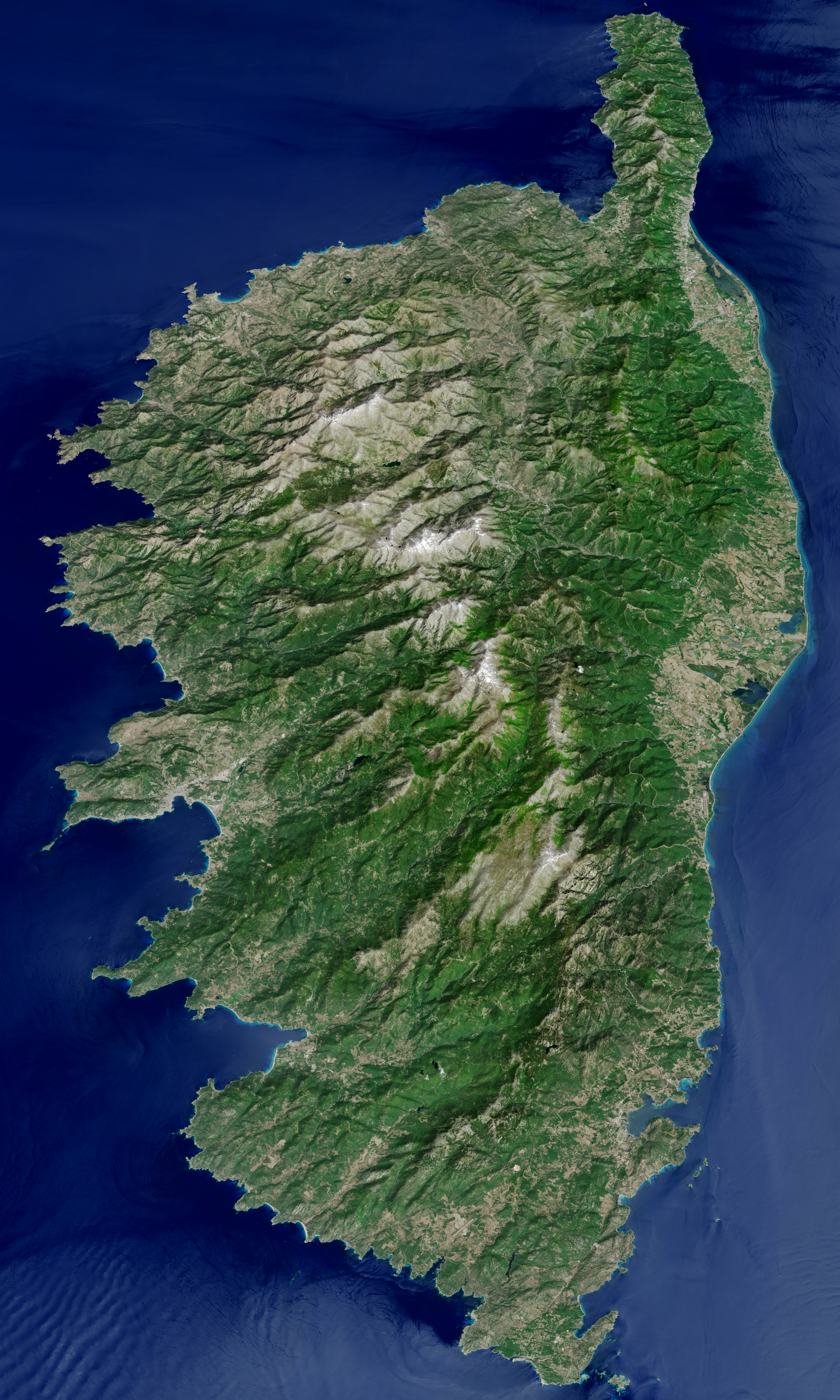
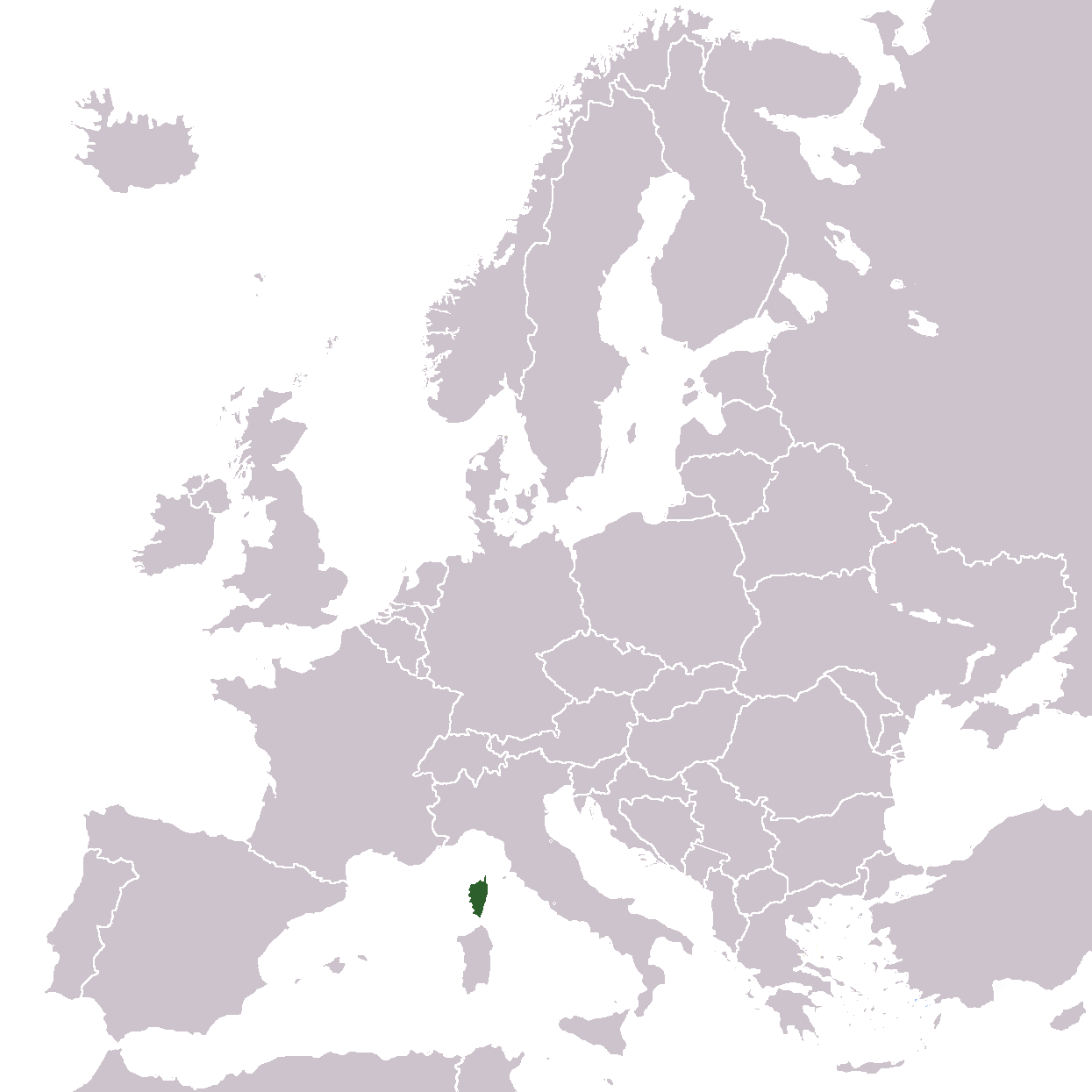
- Coordinates: 42°N 9°E
- Country: France
- Prefecture: Ajaccio
- Departments: 2: Corse-du-Sud (2A); Haute-Corse (2B)

Government
  - President of the Executive Council of Corsica: Gilles Giovannangeli (Femu a Corsica)
  - President of the Corsican Assembly: Marie-Antoinette Maupertuis
  - Prefect: Amaury de Saint-Quentin

Area
  - Total: 8,722 km^{2} (3,368 sq mi)

Population (Jan. 2026)
  - Total: 365,636
  - Density: 41.92/km^{2} (108.6/sq mi)
  - Languages: Corsican; French; Ligurian; Italian
- Demonym: Corsican

GDP
  - Total: €13.358 billion (2024)
  - Per capita: €36,901 (2024)
- Time zone: UTC+1 (CET)
  - Summer (DST): UTC+2 (CEST)
- ISO 3166 code: FR-20R
- Website: www.isula.corsica

Corsica (Note: (/ˈkɔːrsɪkə/ KOR-sik-ə; Corsican: [ˈkorsiɡa, ˈkɔrsika]; Italian: [ˈkɔrsika]; French: Corse [kɔʁs]; Ligurian: Còrsega)) is an island in the Mediterranean Sea and one of the 18 regions of France. It is the fourth-largest island in the Mediterranean and lies southeast of the French mainland, west of the Italian Peninsula and immediately north of the Italian island of Sardinia, the nearest land mass. A single chain of mountains makes up two-thirds of the island. As of January 2026, it had a population of 365,636.

The island is a territorial collectivity of France, and is expected to achieve "a form of autonomy" within France in the future. The regional capital is Ajaccio. Although the region is divided into two administrative departments, Haute-Corse and Corse-du-Sud, their respective regional and departmental territorial collectivities were merged on 1 January 2018 to form the single territorial collectivity of Corsica. Corsican autonomy is more extensive than in other regional collectivities of France and the Corsican Assembly is permitted to exercise limited executive powers. Corsica's second largest town is Bastia, located in the prefecture of Haute-Corse.

Corsica was ruled by the Republic of Genoa from 1284 to 1755, when it seceded to become a self-proclaimed, Italian-speaking republic. In 1768, Genoa officially ceded it to Louis XV of France as part of a pledge for the debts incurred after enlisting French military help in suppressing the Corsican revolt; as a result, France annexed the island in 1769. The future Emperor of the French, Napoleon Bonaparte, was a native Corsican, born that same year in Ajaccio. His ancestral home, Maison Bonaparte, has become a visitor attraction and museum. Because of Corsica's historical ties to Tuscany, the island has retained many Italian cultural elements, and many Corsican surnames are rooted in the Italian Peninsula. French is the official and most widely spoken language on the island with Corsican, the native language and an Italo-Dalmatian language, also recognized as one of France's regional languages. Corsica is the third-least populated region of France after Mayotte and French Guiana.

Recent Corsican history has been largely shaped around the growing nationalist movement within the region. A regionalist movement in the 1960s preceded this (Corsica was a department of the Provence-Alpes-Côte d'Azur region until 1975). Following an armed standoff between French authorities and Corsican autonomists in 1975, and the harsh response from French authorities, an ongoing armed conflict began between French forces and Corsican nationalist guerrilla and paramilitary groups, most notably the National Liberation Front of Corsica (FLNC) and its many descendants. War-like violence continued until 2014, when a truce was announced between the FLNC-Union of Combatants, the largest faction of the Corsican nationalists, and the French government. The second largest faction, the FLNC-22 October, signed a truce in 2016. Violence picked up in 2022 after the murder of Yvan Colonna, a jailed Corsican nationalist, murdered by a prison inmate. Many suspect the French government is involved in the attack, and in 2023 the FLNC-UC and FLNC-22U resumed armed conflict.

== History ==
=== Prehistory and antiquity ===
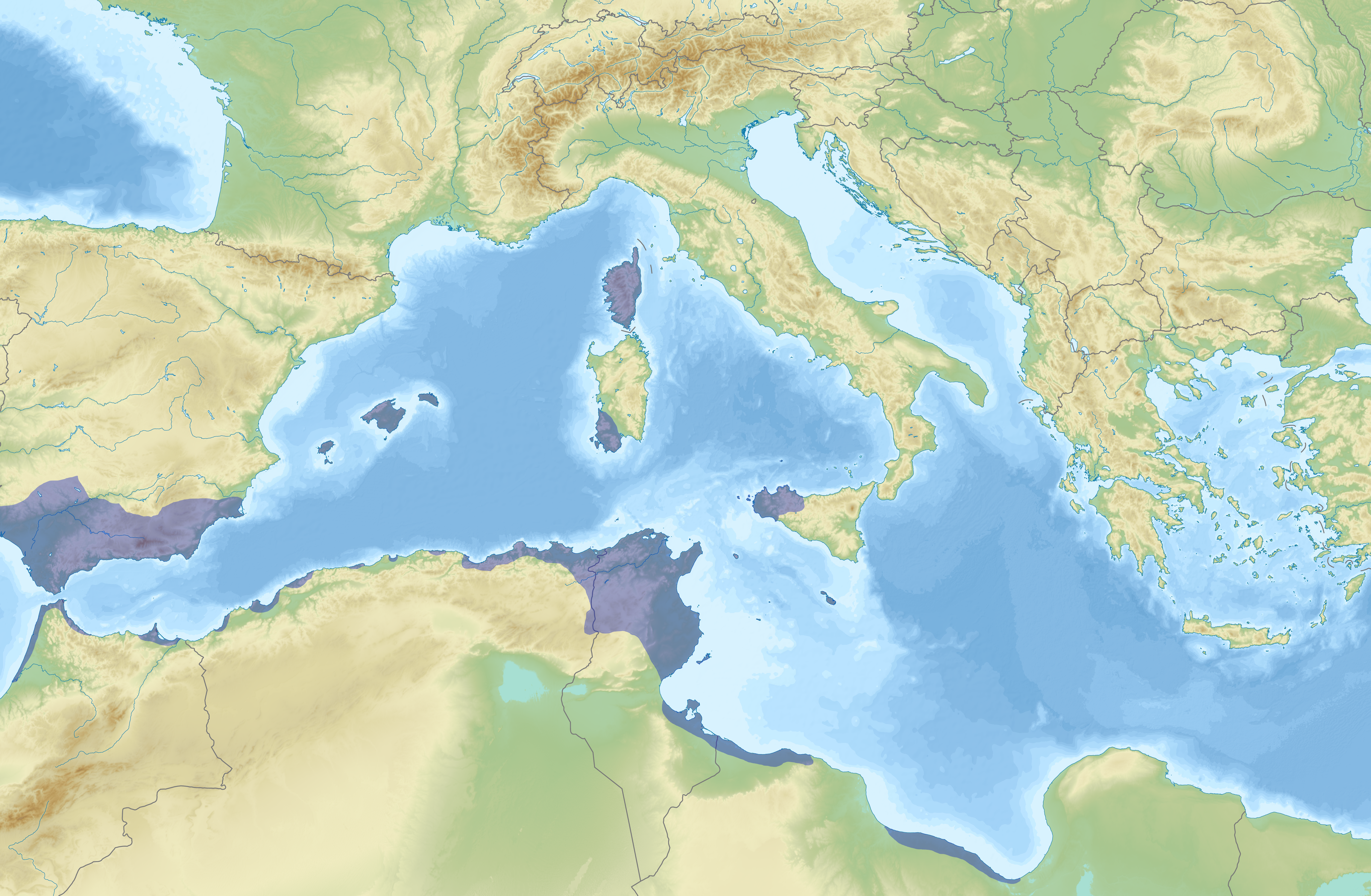
Carthage and its dependencies in 264 BC

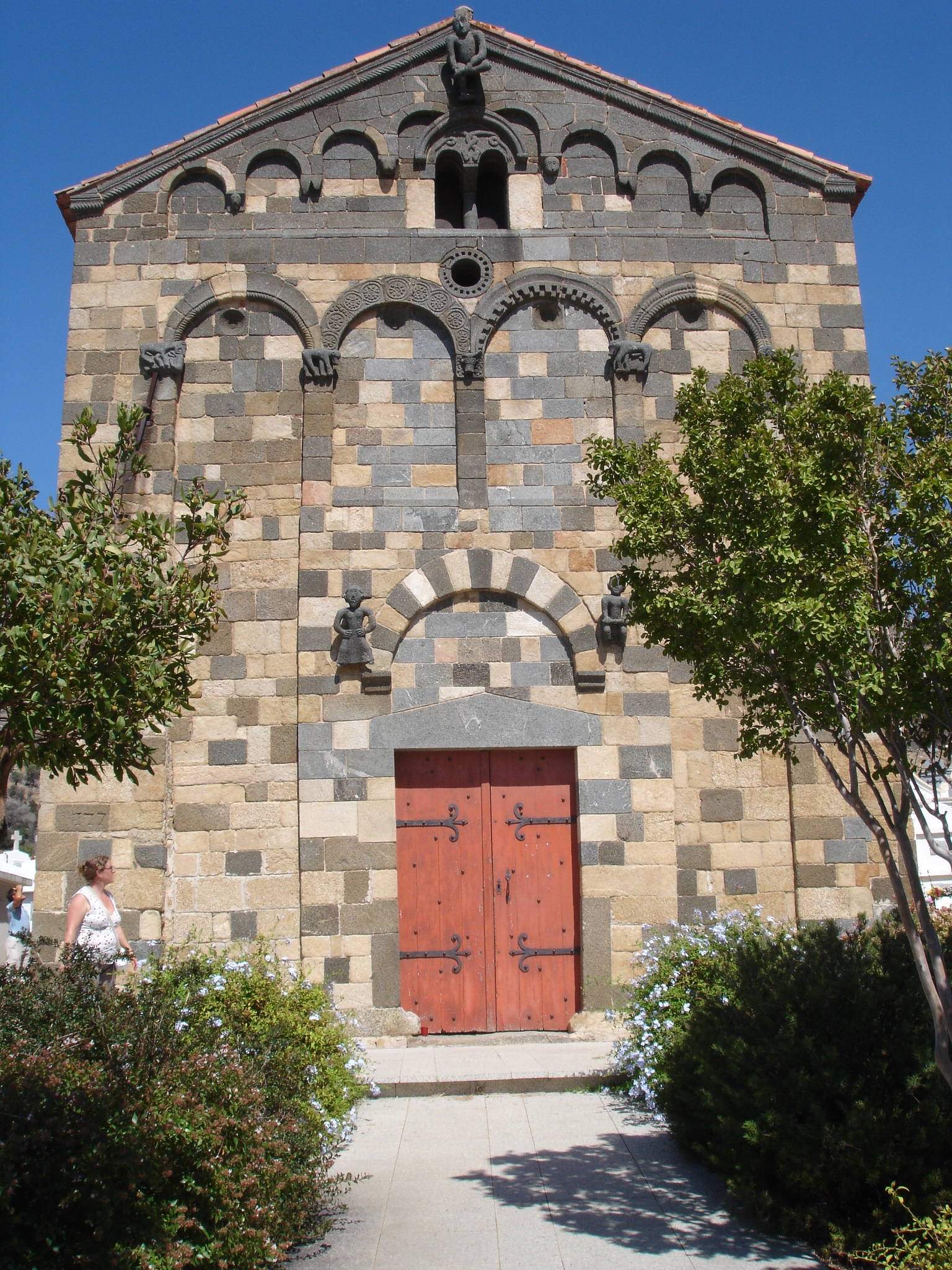
The Romanesque-Pisan style of the Church of Aregno

Corsica has been occupied since the Mesolithic era, otherwise known as the Middle Stone Age. The permanent human presence in Corsica is documented in the Neolithic period from the 6th millennium BC.

After a brief occupation by the Carthaginians, colonization by the ancient Greeks, and a slightly longer occupation by the Etruscans, it was incorporated by the Roman Republic at the end of the First Punic War. In 238 BC, along with Sardinia, the islands became a province of the Roman Republic. The Romans established colonies at Mariana and Aléria on the east coast, but they had little control over the interior. The Greeks, who had earlier built a colony in Aléria, considered Corsica to be one of the most backward regions of the Roman world. The island produced sheep, honey, resin and wax, and exported many slaves. Moreover, it was known for its cheap wines, exported to Rome, and was used as a place of exile; one of the most famous Romans exiled there was the philosopher Seneca.

Corsica was integrated into Roman Italy by Emperor Diocletian (r. 284–305). Administratively, the island was divided into pagi, which in the Middle Ages became the pievi, the basic administrative units of the island until 1768.

=== Middle Ages ===
In the fifth century, the western half of the Roman Empire collapsed, and the island was invaded by the Vandals and the Ostrogoths. Briefly recovered by the Byzantine Empire, it soon became part of the Kingdom of the Lombards. This made it a dependency of the Duchy of Tuscia, which used it as an outpost against the Saracens. Pepin the Short, king of the Franks and Charlemagne's father, expelled the Lombards and nominally granted Corsica to Pope Stephen II. In the first quarter of the 11th century, Pisa and Genoa together freed the island from the threat of Arab invasion. After that, the island came under the influence of the Republic of Pisa. Many polychrome churches which adorn the island date from this period. Corsica also experienced a massive immigration from Tuscany, which gave to the island its present toponymy and rendered the language spoken in the northern two-thirds of the island very close to the Tuscan dialect. This led to the traditional division of Corsica into two parts, along the main chain of mountains roughly going from Calvi to Porto-Vecchio: the eastern Banda di dentro, or Cismonte, more populated, developed, and open to the commerce with Italy, and the western Banda di fuori, or Pomonte, almost deserted, wild and remote.

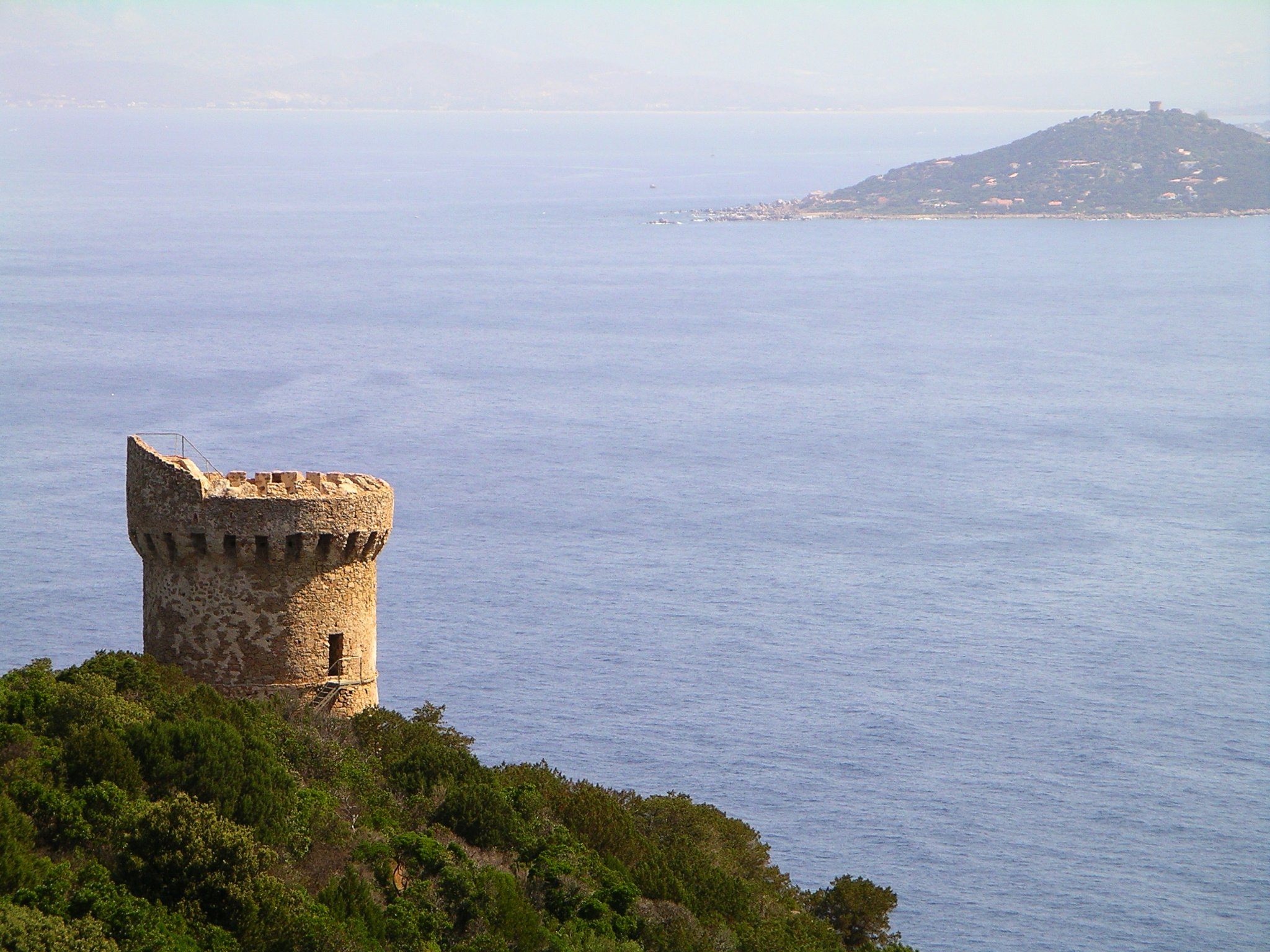
The Tour de Capu di Muru, a Genoese tower in the commune of Coti-Chiavari. Towers were built as Barbary pirates frequently attacked Corsica

The defeat experienced by Pisa in 1284 in the Battle of Meloria against Genoa had among its consequences the end of the Pisan rule and the beginning of the Genoese influence in Corsica: this was contested initially by the King of Aragon, who in 1296 had received from the Pope the investiture over Sardinia and Corsica. A popular revolution against this and the feudal lords, led by Sambucuccio d'Alando, got the aid of Genoa. After that, the Cismonte was ruled as a league of comuni and churches, after the Italian experience. The following 150 years were a period of conflict, when the Genoese rule was contested by Aragon, the local lords, the comuni and the Pope: finally, in 1450 Genoa ceded the administration of the island to its main bank, the Bank of Saint George, which brought peace.

In the 16th century, the island entered into the fight between Spain and France for supremacy in Italy. In 1553, a Franco-Ottoman fleet occupied Corsica, but the reaction of Spain and Genoa, led by Andrea Doria, reestablished the Genoese supremacy on the island, confirmed by the Peace of Cateau-Cambrésis. Sampiero Corso (Sampiero di Bastelica) would later come to be considered a hero of the island. Their power reinstated, the Genoese did not allow the Corsican nobility to share in the government of the island and oppressed the inhabitants with a heavy tax burden. On the other hand, they introduced the chestnut tree on a large scale, improving the diet of the population, and built a chain of towers along the coast to defend Corsica from the attacks of the Barbary pirates from North Africa. The period of peace lasted until 1729, when the refusal to pay taxes by a peasant sparked the general insurrection of the island against Genoa.

The island became known for the large number of mercenary soldiers and officers it produced. In 1743, over 4,600 Corsicans, or 4% of the entire population of the island, were serving as soldiers in various armies (predominantly those of Genoa, Venice, and Spain), making it one of the most militarized societies in Europe.

=== Corsican Republic ===
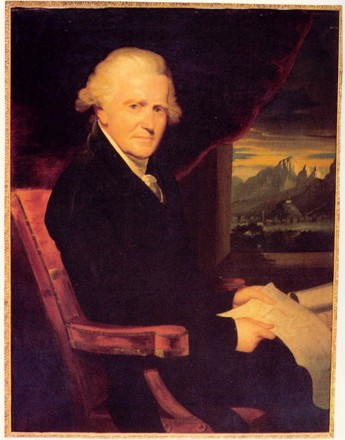
Pasquale Paoli, leader of the Corsican resistance, and the first and only General of the Corsican Republic

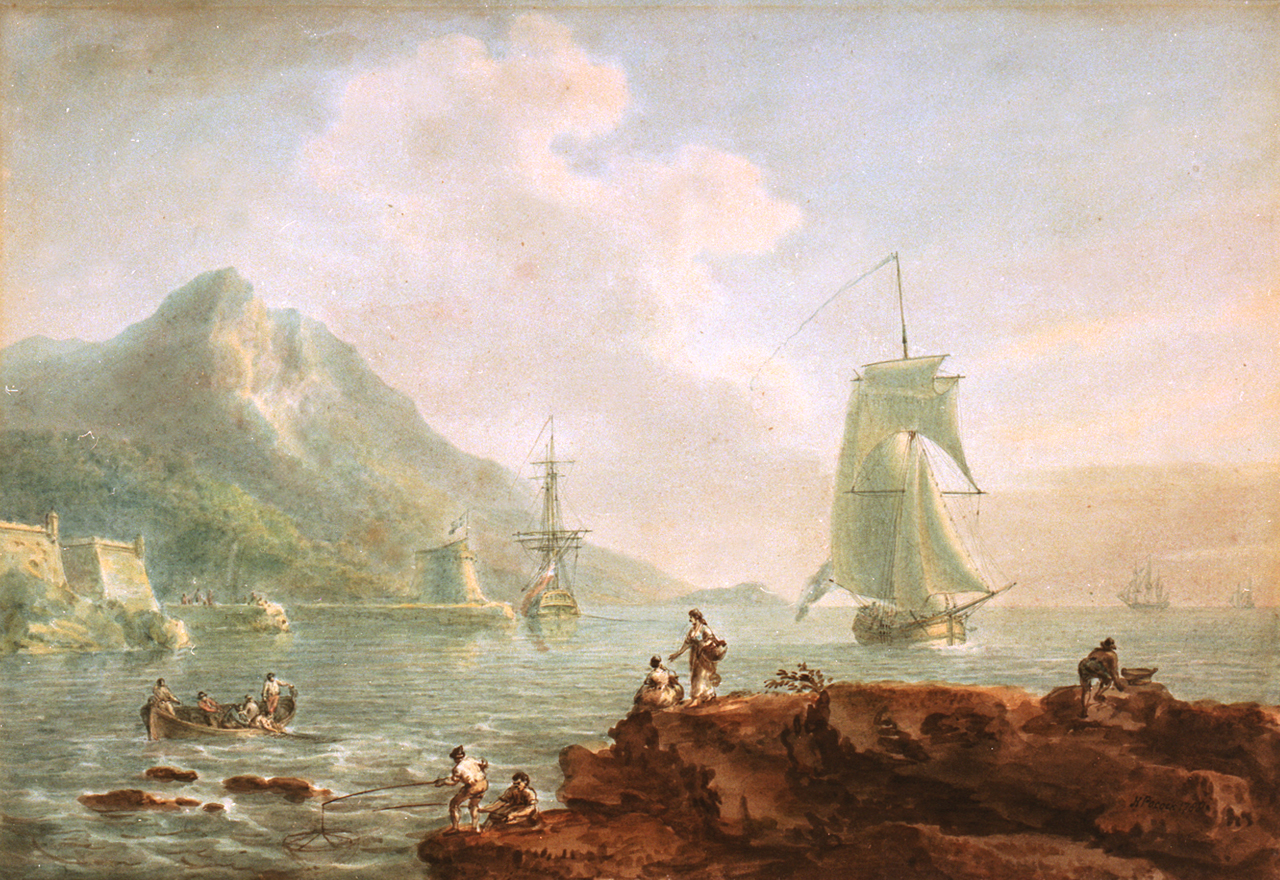
A view of Corsica and Martello tower, 1788 painting "A cutter and a man of war off Corsica" by Nicholas Pocock

In 1729, the Corsican Revolution for independence from Genoa began, first led by Luiggi Giafferi and Giacinto Paoli, and later by Paoli's son, Pasquale Paoli. After 26 years of struggle against the Republic of Genoa, including an ephemeral attempt in 1736 to proclaim an independent Kingdom of Corsica under the German adventurer Theodor von Neuhoff, an independent Corsican Republic was proclaimed in 1755 under the leadership of Pasquale Paoli and remained sovereign until 1769 when the island was conquered by France.

Following the outbreak of the French Revolution in 1789, Pasquale Paoli was able to return to Corsica from exile in Britain. In 1794, he invited British forces under Lord Hood to intervene to free Corsica from French rule. Anglo-Corsican forces drove the French from the island and established an Anglo-Corsican Kingdom. Following Spain's entry into the war, the British decided to withdraw from Corsica in 1796.

=== 19th century ===
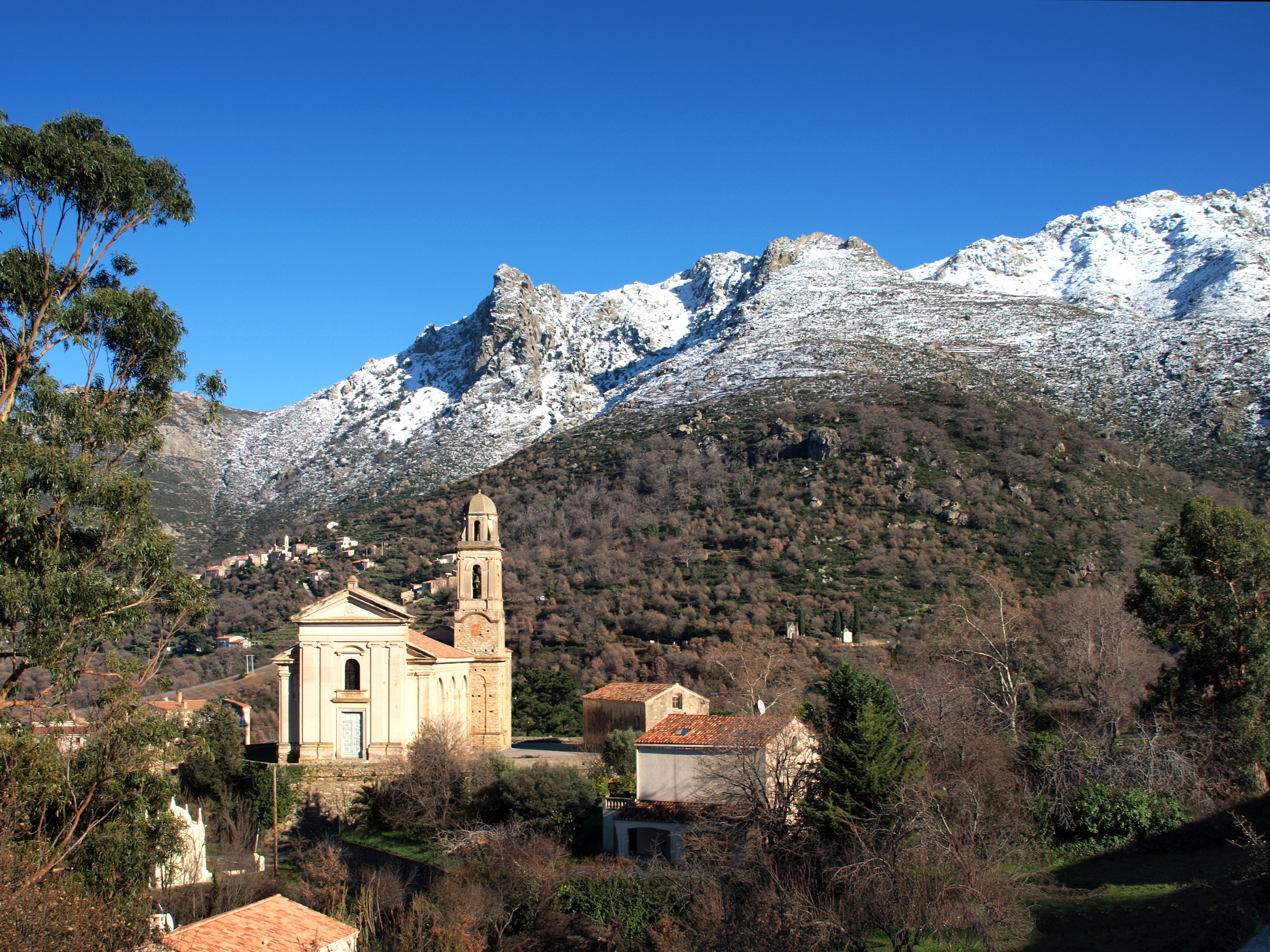
Saint-Nicolas church in Feliceto

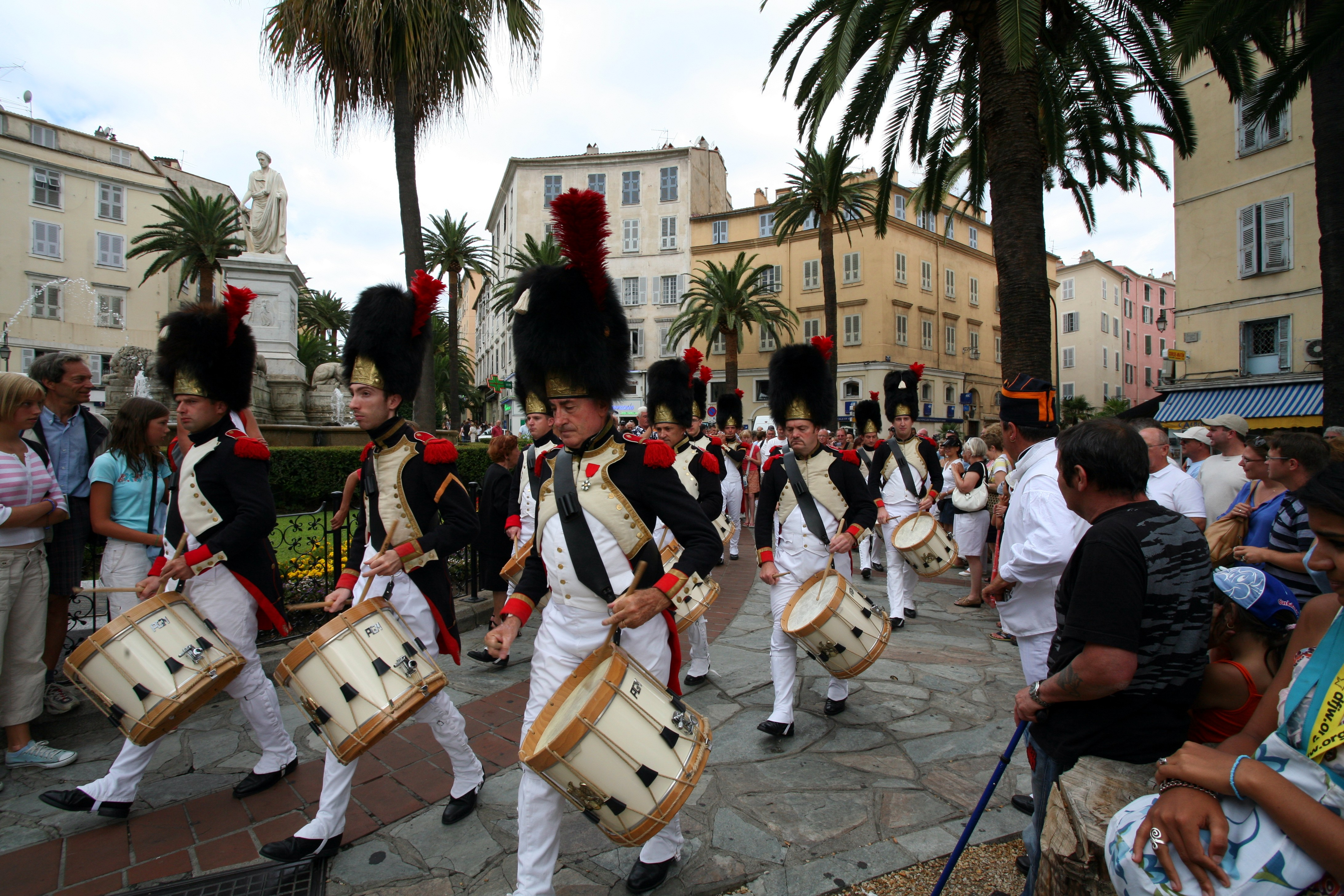
Corsicans commemorating the anniversary of the birth of Napoleon

Despite being the birthplace of the Emperor, the island was slightly neglected by Napoleon's government. In 1814, near the end of the Napoleonic Wars, Corsica was briefly occupied again by British troops. The Treaty of Bastia gave the British crown sovereignty over the island, but it was later repudiated by Lord Castlereagh who insisted that the island should be returned to a restored French monarchy.

After the restoration, the island was further neglected by the French state. Despite the presence of a middle class in Bastia and Ajaccio, Corsica remained an otherwise primitive place, whose economy consisted mainly of subsistence agriculture, and whose population constituted a pastoral society, dominated by clans and the rules of vendetta. The code of vendetta required Corsicans to seek deadly revenge for offences against their family's honor. Between 1821 and 1852, no fewer than 4,300 murders were perpetrated in Corsica. During the first half of the century, the people of Corsica were still immersed in the Italian cultural world: the bourgeoisie sent children to Pisa to study, official acts were enacted in Italian and most books were printed in Italian. Moreover, many islanders sympathised with the national struggle which was taking place in nearby Italy in those years: several political refugees from the peninsula, like Niccolò Tommaseo, spent years on the island, while some Corsicans, like Count Leonetto Cipriani, took active part in the fights for Italian independence.

Despite all that, during those years the Corsicans began to feel an increasingly strong attachment to France. The reasons for that are manifold: the knowledge of the French language, which thanks to the mandatory primary school started to penetrate among the local youth, the high prestige of French culture, the awareness of being part of a big, powerful state, the possibility of well-paid jobs as civil servants, both in the island, in the mainland and in the colonies, the prospect of serving the French army during the wars for the conquest of the colonial empire, the introduction of steamboats, which reduced the travel time between mainland France and the island drastically, and – last but not least – Napoleon himself, whose existence alone constituted an indissoluble link between France and Corsica. Thanks to all these factors by around 1870 Corsica had landed in the French cultural world.

From the 19th century into the mid-20th century, Corsicans also grew closer to the French nation through participation in the French Empire. Compared to much of Metropolitan France, Corsica was poor and many Corsicans emigrated. While Corsicans emigrated globally, especially to many South American countries, many chose to move within the French Empire which acted as a conduit for emigration and eventual return, as many young Corsican men could find better job opportunities in the far corners of the Empire where many other French hesitated to go. In many parts of the Empire, Corsicans were strongly represented, such as in Saigon where in 1926 12% of Europeans were from Corsica. Across the French Empire, many Corsicans retained a sense of community by establishing organizations where they would meet regularly, keep one another informed of developments in Corsica, and come to one another's aid in times of need.

=== Modern era ===
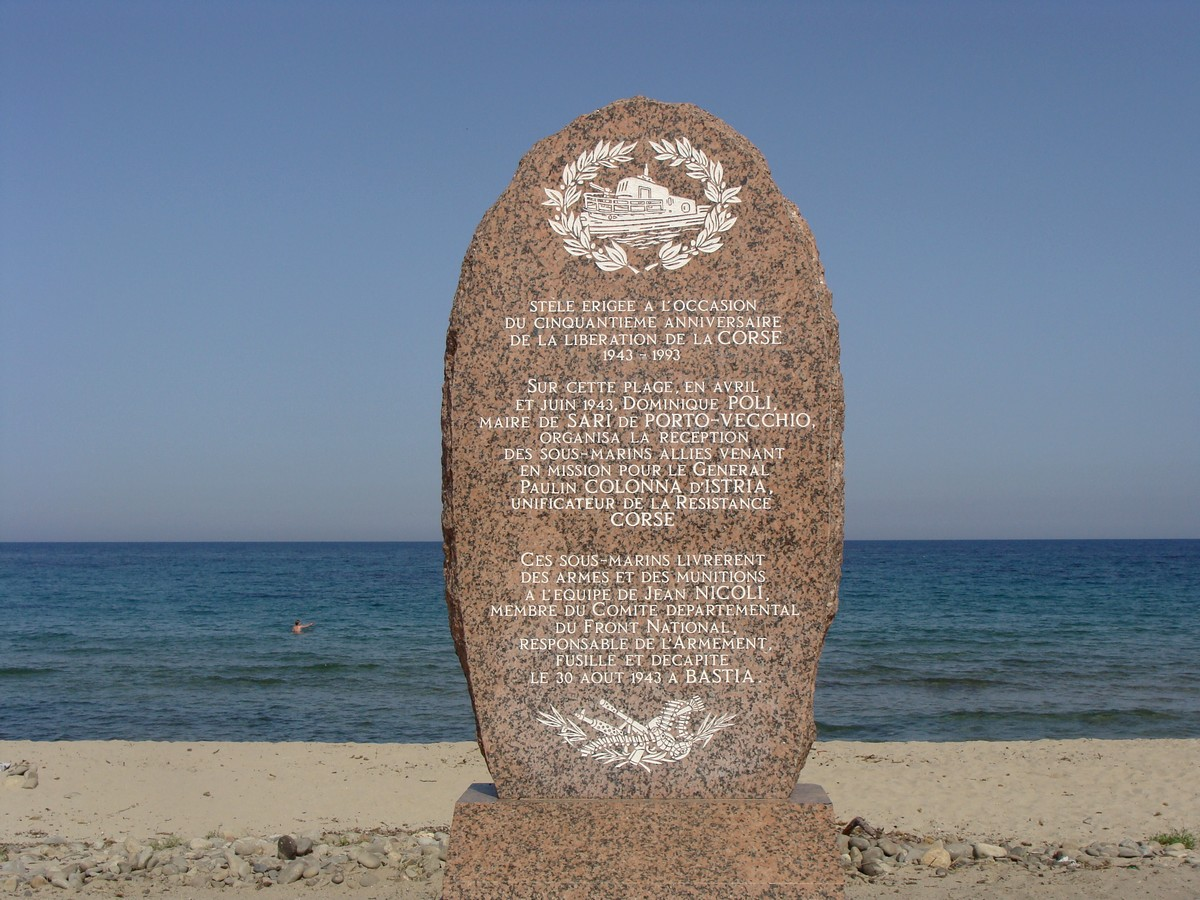
Monument to the 50th anniversary of the liberation of Corsica during World War II in Solaro (plaine orientale)

After the collapse of France to the German Wehrmacht in 1940, Corsica came under the rule of the Vichy French regime, which was collaborating with Nazi Germany. In November 1942 the island was occupied by Italian and German forces following the Anglo-American landings in North Africa. After the Italian armistice in September 1943, Italian and Free French Forces pushed the Germans out of the island, making Corsica the first French department to be freed.

During the May 1958 crisis, the French military command in Algeria mutinied against the French Fourth Republic and on 24 May occupied the island in an action called Opération Corse that led to the collapse of the government; the second phase of the coup attempt, occupying Paris, was cancelled following the establishment of a transitional government under Charles de Gaulle.

=== Corsican conflict ===
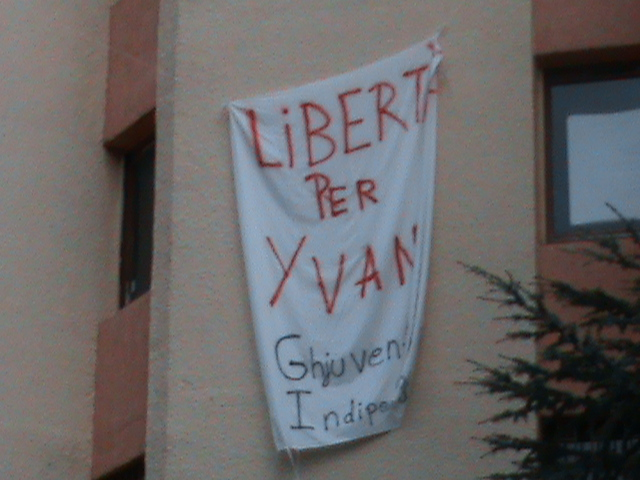
Banner at the Pasquale Paoli University erected by supporters of Corsican independence, calling for the release of Yvan Colonna

In the early morning of 5 May 1976, a series of 21 attacks occurred across the island. These were claimed by a previously unknown group, the National Liberation Front of Corsica (Fronte di Liberazione Naziunale di a Corsica, FLNC). This group, modeled after the Algerian National Liberation Front, carried out a series of guerrilla attacks, mostly bombings, in the name of Corsican nationalism. By the afternoon of 5 May, a series of demands, called the Manifesto of 5 May, was released, expressing desire to detach itself from the French state and pursue the interest of Corsicans, who they claimed had lived under a colonial state since the time of the Genoese. This is considered the beginning of the Corsican conflict.

From 5 May onwards, the FLNC carried out a large number of bomb attacks, ambushes, and other acts of guerrilla warfare against French forces, which they described as “colonial forces”. Notable attacks in the 1970s include the bombing of the Pigno transmitter in Bastia in 1977, the bombing of the air base in Solenzara in 1978, and the bombing of 23 buildings in Paris in one day in 1979.

In 1981, the FLNC called a truce and supported François Mitterrand’s socialist campaign for president in order to open discussion with the socialist party in hopes of securing a Corsican autonomy process that would lead to eventual independence. The resulting Defferre Agreements were marked with instability, including an attempted assassination of sitting president Giscard shortly before the 1981 election. The FLNC achieved the reopening of the University of Corsica, but withdrew from the agreements in early 1982. The following agreements between Corsican autonomists and other government officials resulted in the creation of the Corsican Assembly and other government institutions.

Following the departure of the FLNC from the agreements and the return of violence, the FLNC carried out larger operations in both number and scale; the 1980s is generally considered the deadliest period of the conflict.

In May 1988, The FLNC signed a truce with the government similar to the 1981 truce. This caused a rift in the movement and would result in a division within the FLNC. The pro-truce “habituels” led by Alain Orsoni, formed the FLNC-Canal Habituel (Canale Abituale, FLNC-CA). The anti-truce “historiques” formed the FLNC-Canal Historique (Canale Storicu, FLNC-CS). A smaller third split called Resistenza, led by members unhappy with both of the other two movements, also formed. These three groups engaged in warfare between each other for most of the 1990s. Resistenza would gradually lower their arms before becoming a pro-peace organization in 1996. The FLNC-CA would announce its self-dissolution in 1996, which would result in a split amongst pro-war members creating the FLNC-5 May. The FLNC-CS participated in failed negotiations with the French government in 1996. Militants of the independent Cargèse-Sagone brigade carried out an assassination of prefect Claude Érignac in 1998.

In 1999, the FLNC-Union of Combatants (Unione di Cumbattenti, FLNC-UC) formed out of a union between the FLNC-CS, FLNC-5M, an FLNC-CS splinter group called Fronte Ribellu, and a minor group called Clandestinu. In 2002, the FLNC-UC split, with more radical members forming the FLNC-22 October (22 Uttrovi, FLNC-22U). These groups led the nationalist in the conflict (with numerous minor groups) until 2014 and 2016, when the groups respectively signed truces.

In 2022, Corsican nationalist Yvan Colonna was killed by an inmate. This resulted in large waves of unrest in Corsica which reignited the conflict.

The August 2022 Corsica derecho swept across the island and killed six people, injured dozens of others, and caused significant damage.

== Geography ==
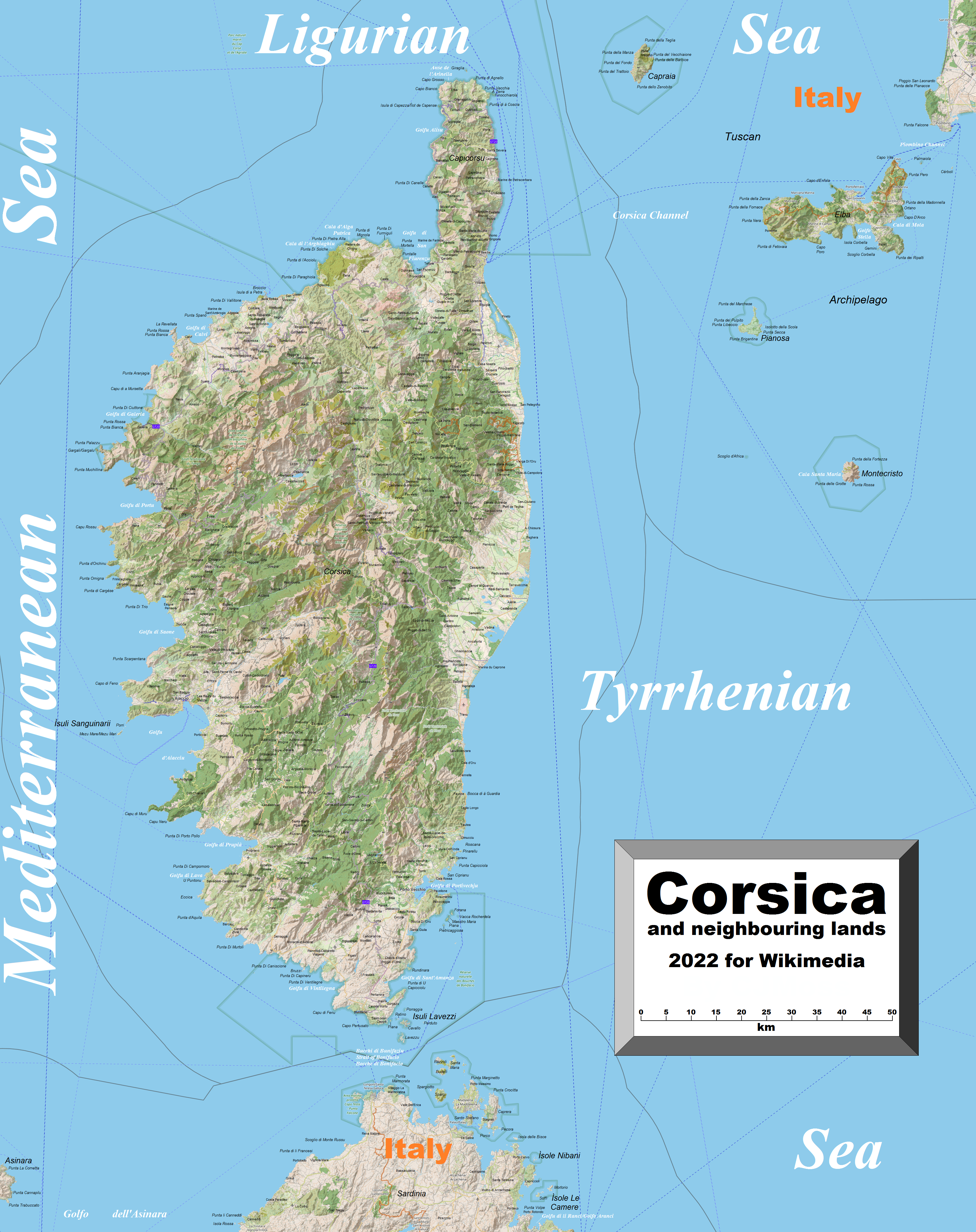
Detailed map of Corsica and environs

Corsica was formed about 250 million years ago with the uplift of a granite backbone on the western side. About 50 million years ago sedimentary rock was pressed against this granite, forming the schists of the eastern side. It is the most mountainous island in the Mediterranean, a "mountain in the sea".

The island is 183 km (114 mi) long at its longest, 83 km (52 mi) wide at its widest, has 1,000 km (620 mi) of coastline, with more than 200 beaches such as Paraguano. Corsica is very mountainous, with Monte Cinto as the highest peak at 2,706 m (8,878 ft), and around 120 other summits of more than 2,000 m (6,600 ft). Mountains comprise two-thirds of the island, forming a single chain. Forests make up 20% of the island.

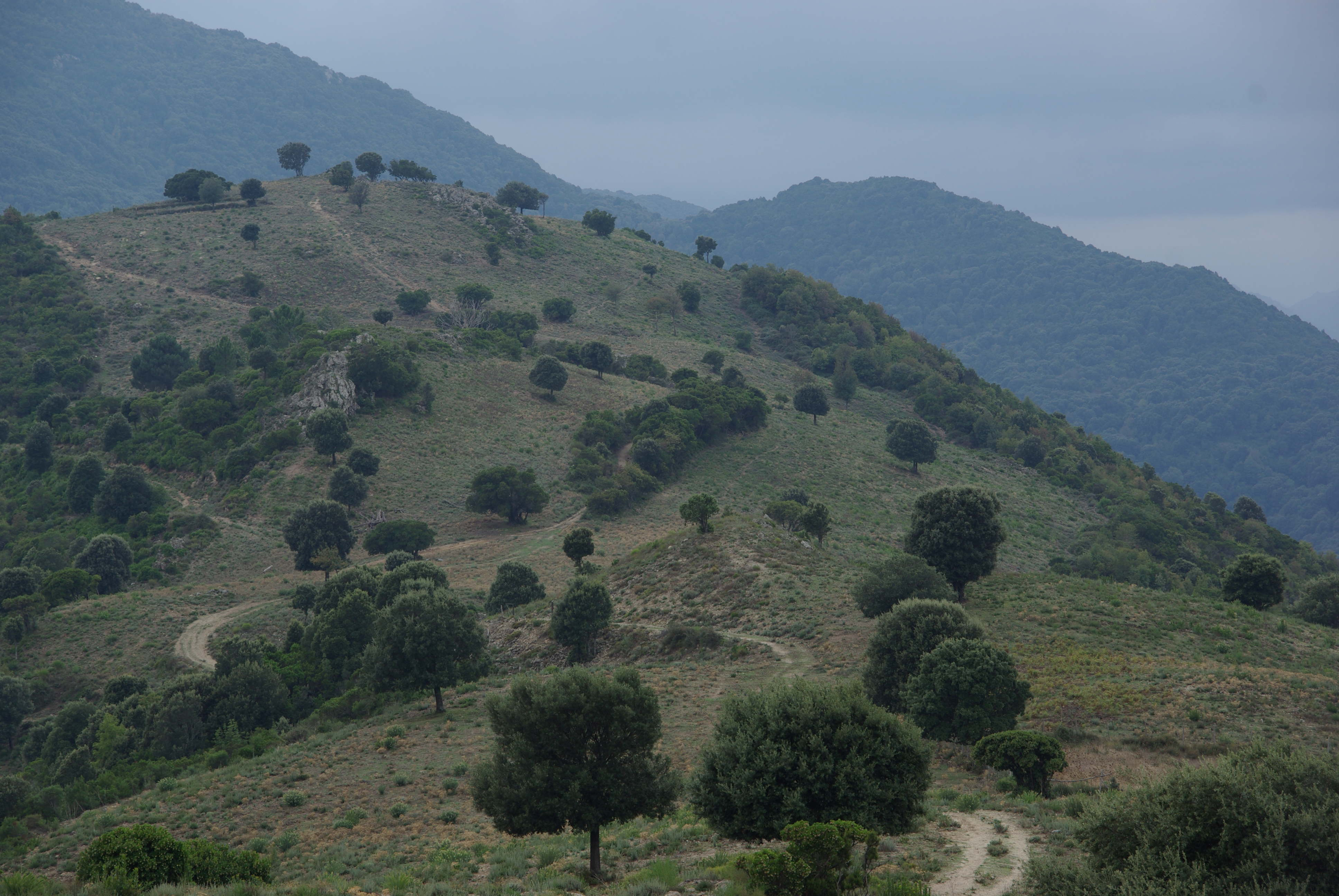
Corsican natural park, Parc naturel régional de Corse

It is also the fourth largest island in the Mediterranean, after Sicily, Sardinia and Cyprus.

Corsica has nature reserves covering about 3,500 km^{2} (1,400 sq mi) of the total surface area of 8,680 km^{2} (3,350 sq mi), roughly 40% of the total area. Primarily located in its interior is Parc naturel régional de Corse. Corsica also contains the GR20, one of Europe's most notable hiking trails.

The island is 90 km (56 mi) from Tuscany in Italy and 170 km (110 mi) from the Côte d'Azur in France. It is separated from Sardinia to the south by the Strait of Bonifacio, which has a width of 11 km (6.8 mi) at its narrowest point.

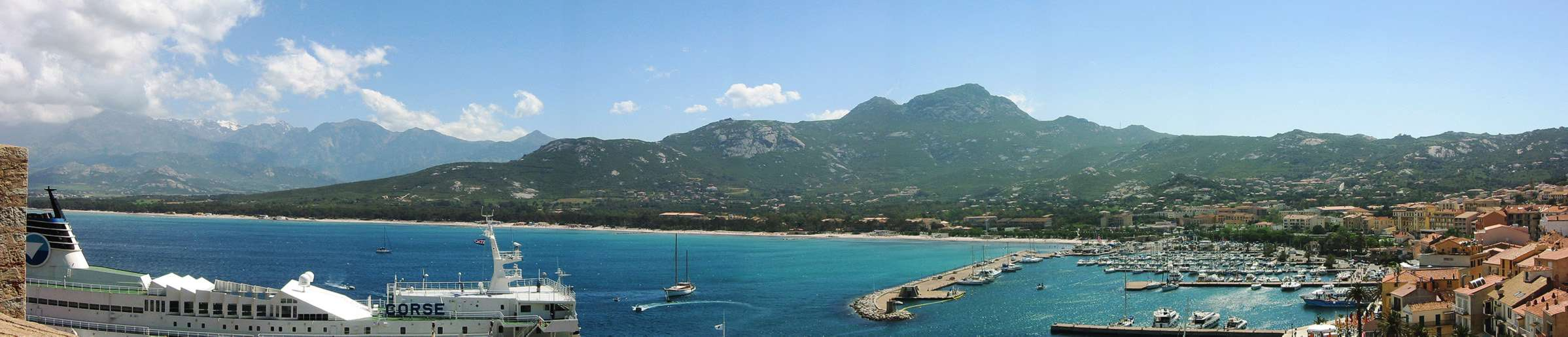
The Bay of Calvi: Corsica is the most mountainous Mediterranean island.

=== Major communities ===
In 2005 the population of Corsica was settled in approximately 360 communities.

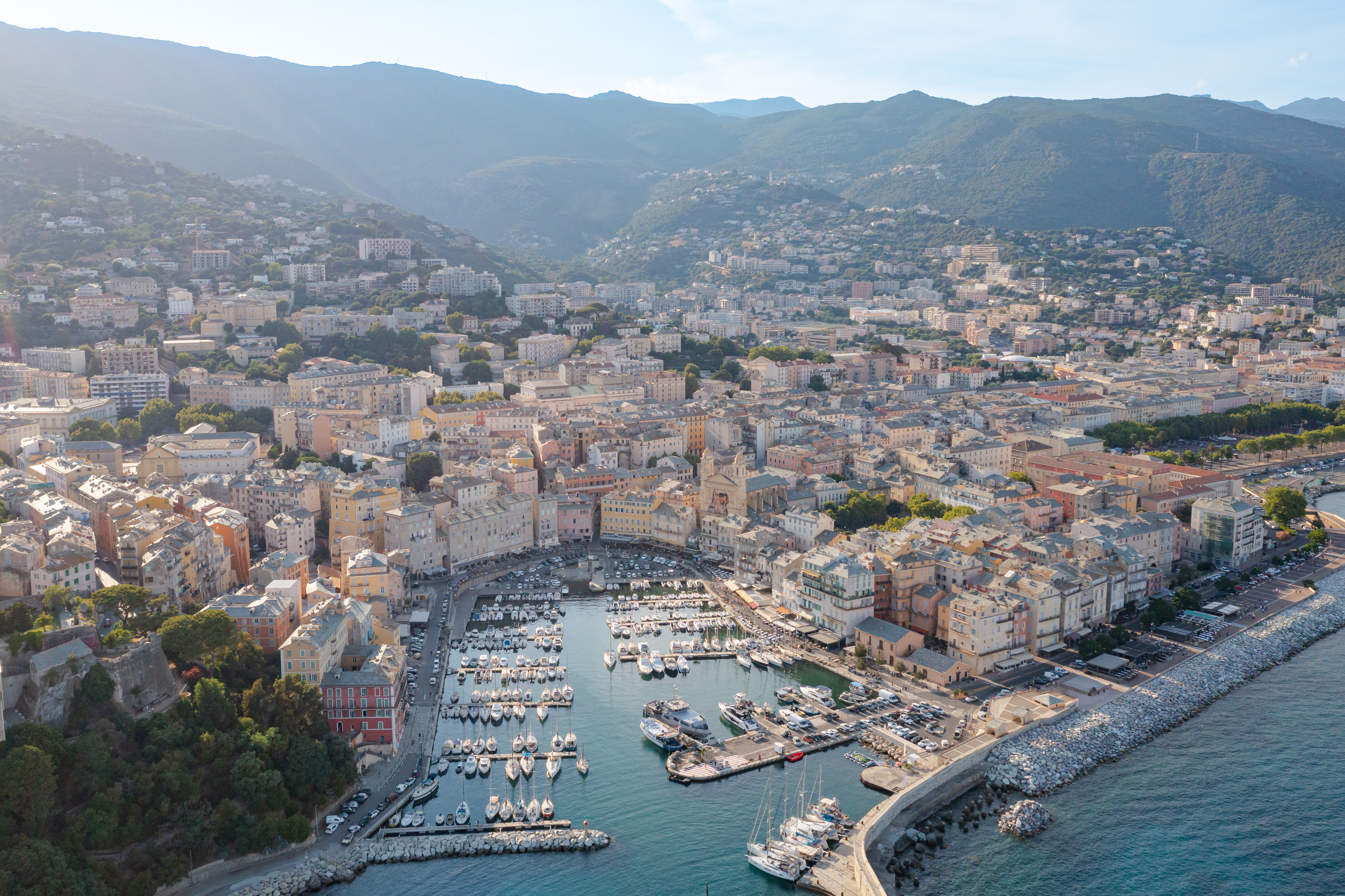
Port of Bastia in Corsica, Haute-Corse department

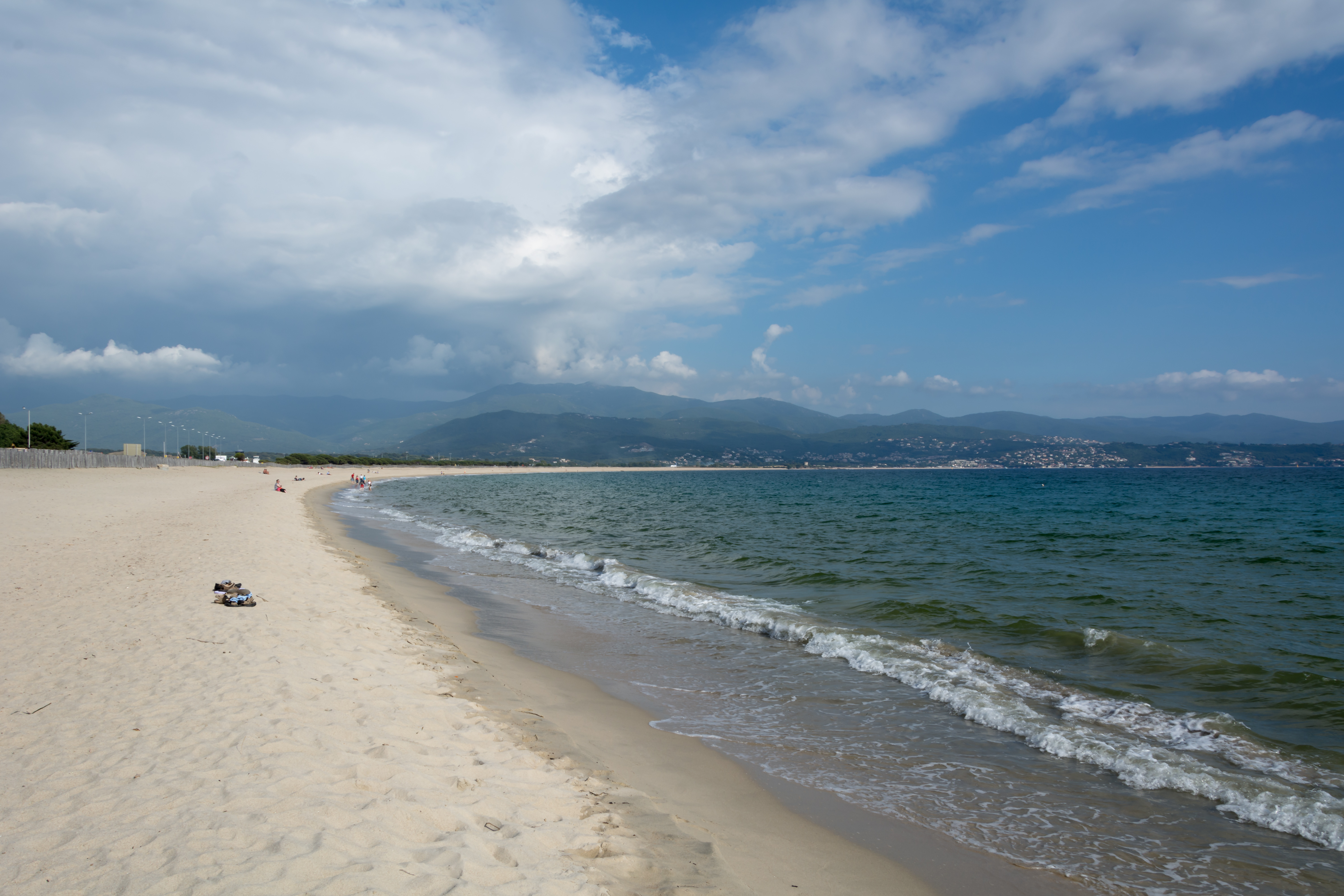
Ajaccio gulf beach of Ricanto in Corsica, Corse-du-Sud department

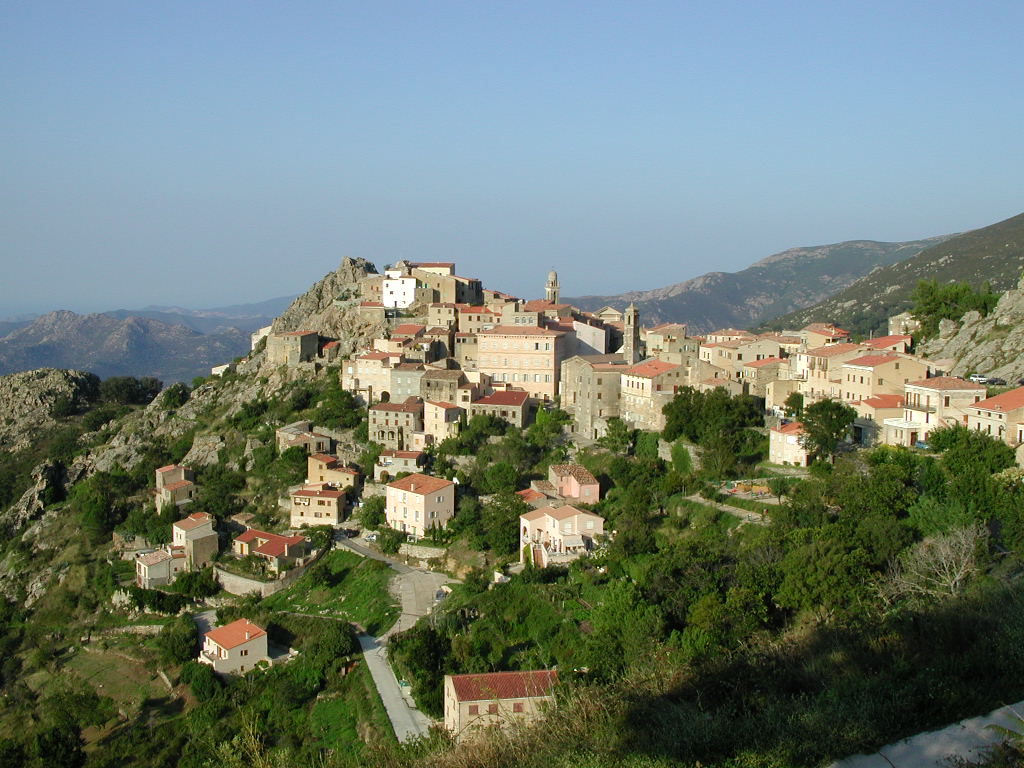
A view of Speloncato

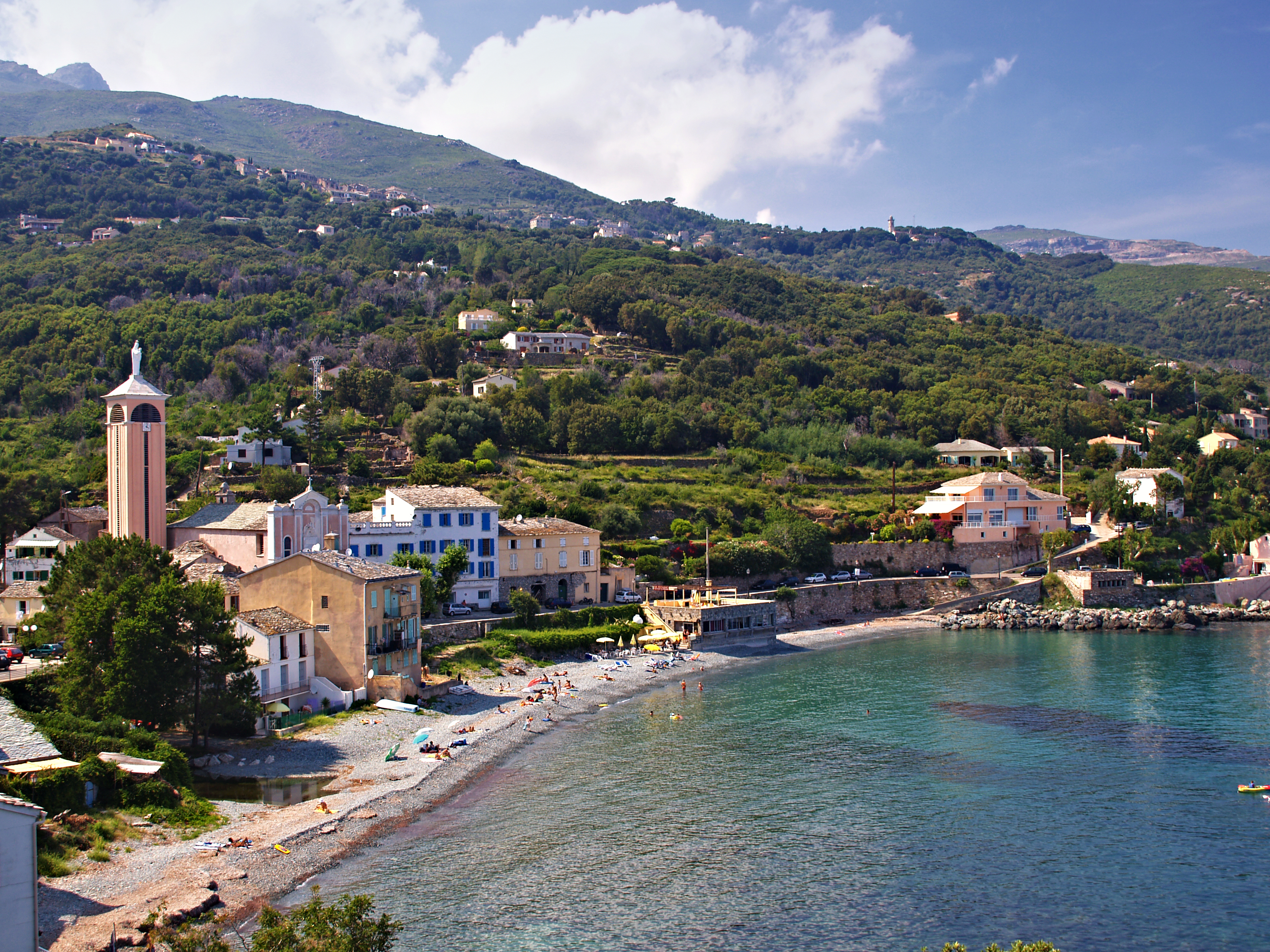
Brando in the Haute-Corse department

=== Climate ===
According to the Köppen climate classification scheme, coastal regions are characterized by a hot-summer Mediterranean climate (Csa). Further inland, a warm-summer Mediterranean climate (Csb) is more common. At the highest elevation locations, small areas with a subarctic climate (Dsc, Dfc) and the rare Mediterranean climate can be found.

The station of Sari-Solenzara records the highest year-round temperatures in Metropolitan France, with an annual average of 16.41 °C over the 1981–2010 period. The average amount of sunshine received annually was 2,715 hours in the period 2008–2016.

Climate data for Sari-Solenzara, south-eastern part of island
Month	Jan	Feb	Mar	Apr	May	Jun	Jul	Aug	Sep	Oct	Nov	Dec	Year
Mean daily maximum °C (°F)	13.6 (56.5)	14.0 (57.2)	15.9 (60.6)	18.1 (64.6)	22.2 (72.0)	26.1 (79.0)	29.4 (84.9)	29.7 (85.5)	26.3 (79.3)	22.1 (71.8)	17.4 (63.3)	14.3 (57.7)	20.76 (69.37)
Daily mean °C (°F)	9.7 (49.5)	9.8 (49.6)	11.6 (52.9)	13.7 (56.7)	17.8 (64.0)	21.3 (70.3)	24.5 (76.1)	24.8 (76.6)	21.7 (71.1)	18.0 (64.4)	13.6 (56.5)	10.7 (51.3)	16.41 (61.54)
Mean daily minimum °C (°F)	5.8 (42.4)	5.6 (42.1)	7.3 (45.1)	9.3 (48.7)	12.9 (55.2)	16.5 (61.7)	19.5 (67.1)	19.9 (67.8)	17.1 (62.8)	13.9 (57.0)	9.8 (49.6)	7.1 (44.8)	12.06 (53.71)
Average precipitation mm (inches)	71.1 (2.80)	58.3 (2.30)	61.2 (2.41)	79.9 (3.15)	45.8 (1.80)	25.1 (0.99)	12.1 (0.48)	28.4 (1.12)	88.3 (3.48)	125.6 (4.94)	94.2 (3.71)	103.7 (4.08)	793.7 (31.25)
Average precipitation days (≥ 1 mm)	6.2	6.1	6.5	7.5	4.9	3.0	1.5	2.2	4.8	7.1	8.1	8.7	66.6
Source: Météo France

== Ecology ==
Corsica
Native name: Corsica Nickname: L'Île de Beauté The Isle of Beauty
- Topography of Corsica
- Interactive map of Corsica

Geography
- Location: Mediterranean Sea
- Coordinates: 42°N 9°E
- Area: 8,680 km^{2} (3,350 sq mi)
- Length: 184 km (114.3 mi)
- Width: 83 km (51.6 mi)
- Coastline: 1,000 km (600 mi)
- Highest elevation: 2,706 m (8878 ft)
- Highest point: Monte Cinto

Administration
- France
- Région: Corsica
- Largest settlement: Ajaccio (pop. 63,723)

Demographics
- Population: 349,465 (January 2022)
- Pop. density: 37/km^{2} (96/sq mi)

=== Zones by altitude ===
The island is divided into four major ecological zones, by altitude. Below 600 metres (2,000 ft) is the coastal zone's mild Mediterranean climate, with hot, dry summers and cool, rainy winters. The area's natural vegetation is sparse Mediterranean forest, scrubland, and shrubs. The coastal lowlands are part of the Tyrrhenian-Adriatic sclerophyllous and mixed forests ecoregion, in which forests and woodlands of evergreen sclerophyll oaks predominate, chiefly holm oak (Quercus ilex) and cork oak (Quercus suber). Much of the coastal lowlands have been cleared for agriculture, grazing and logging; these activities have reduced the forest area considerably.

Between 600 and 1,800 m (2,000 and 5,900 ft) is a temperate montane zone. The mountains are cooler and wetter, and home to the Corsican montane broadleaf and mixed forests ecoregion. This region supports diverse forests of oak, pine, and broadleaf deciduous trees, with vegetation more typical of northern Europe. The population lives predominantly below 900 m (3,000 ft), with only shepherds and hikers from 600 to 900 m (2,000 to 3,000 ft).

The subalpine zone, located between 1,750 and 2,100 m (5,740 and 6,890 ft) is characterized by the presence of small trees and shrubs, especially ferns, and heaths.

The elevation above 1,800 to 2,700 m (5,900 to 8,900 ft) is the high alpine zone. Vegetation is sparse, with high winds and frequent cloud cover. This zone is uninhabited.

There is considerable birdlife in Corsica. One famous example is the bearded vulture, or Lammergeier, which (along with the iconic griffon vulture) serve as environmental "janitors" by scavenging the remains of deceased animals, thus limiting the proliferation of infectious microbes and diseases. Other avian species to be seen include the barn owl, blue rock thrush, common crane, Corsican nuthatch, golden eagle, greater flamingo, osprey, peregrine falcon, red kite, and starry bittern. In some cases, Corsica is an isolated portion of a species' distribution; in other cases, it is the furthest point in a species' range. For example, a subspecies of hooded crow (Corvus cornix cornix) occurs in Corsica, but not anywhere further south.

Corsica has abundant reptile and amphibians, one protected species being the sensitive Hermann's tortoise, which are found at A Cupulatta at Vero and Moltifao Regional Natural Park. Corsican brook and fire salamanders, leaf-toed gecko, and yellow and green grass snakes are also common. The European pond turtle can be seen, especially in the waters of Fango Estuary, southern Calvi, Biguglia Lagoon and Pietracorbara.

=== Parc Naturel Régional de Corse ===
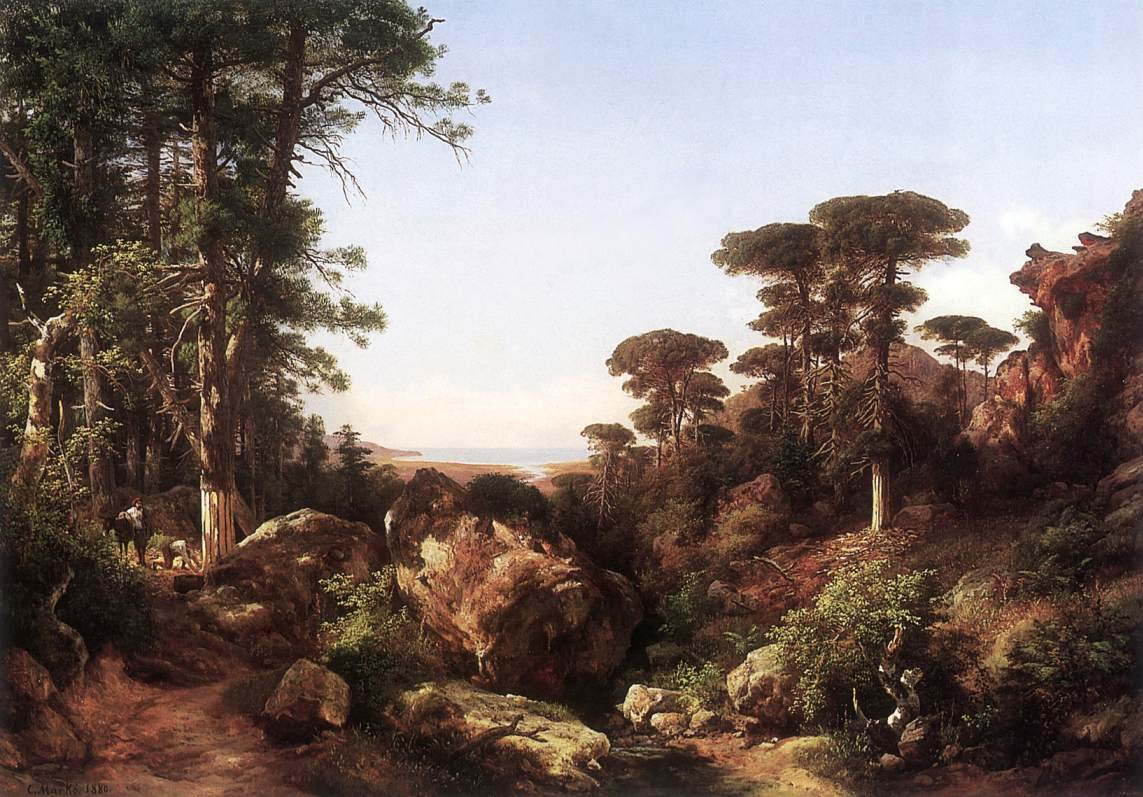
Forest Scene at Ailo in Corsica. An 1870s painting by Károly Markó the Younger.

The island has a natural park (Parc Naturel Régional de Corse, Parcu di Corsica), which protects rare animal and plant species. The park was created in 1972 and includes the Golfe de Porto, the Scandola Nature Reserve (a UNESCO World Heritage Site), and some of the highest mountains on the island. Scandola cannot be reached on foot, but people can gain access by boat from the village of Galéria and Porto (Ota). Two endangered subspecies of hoofed mammals, the European mouflon (Ovis aries musimon) and Corsican red deer (Cervus elaphus corsicanus) inhabit the park. The Corsican red deer was re-introduced after it was extinct due to overhunting. This Corsican subspecies was the same that survived on Sardinia, so it is endemic. There are other species endemic to Corsica especially in the upper mountain ranges, i.e. Corsican nuthatch, Corsican fire salamander and Corsican brook salamander and many plant subspecies.

=== Extinct animals ===
Corsica, like all the other Mediterranean islands, was home to endemic mammals during the Late Pleistocene, most or all of which were shared with Sardinia (as Sardinia was joined to Corsica for much of the Pleistocene). Similarly to other Mediterranean islands, this fauna was generally impoverished and characterized by a low species diversity and incomplete filling of ecological niches. The island's native fauna included the Sardinian dhole, the mustelid Enhydrictis galictoides, the otters Algarolutra majori and Lutra castiglionis, the deer Praemegaceros cazioti, the Corsican giant shrew, the Tyrrhenian mole, the Sardinian pika, the Tyrrhenian vole, and the Tyrrhenian field rat. The marine or semi-marine Sardinian otters Sardolutra ichnusae and Megalenhydris barbaricina may also have been present in Corsica.

Most of the island's native fauna began to die off after the arrival of humans in the Mesolithic, around 8000 BC. By the Neolithic, only four small-bodied species, the Corsican giant shrew, the Sardinian pika, the Tyrrhenian field rat, and the Tyrrhenian vole, survived. Praemegaceros had become locally extinct, although a population survived in Sardinia for a longer span of time. The surviving species were subjected to increased hunting pressures from both humans and introduced animals such as the red fox and least weasel, as well as competition for food from livestock and continental rodent species. However, they remained present on the island until historic times. Their extinction is correlated with the arrival further invasive animals, primarily the black rat, which arrived with the Carthaginians and the Romans, and with a rise in deforestation during the Roman period.

=== Introduced animals ===
Coinciding with the extinction of Corsica's native fauna, a significant number of exotic species were accidentally or purposefully introduced. Foreign animals arrived in two broad waves, the first during the Neolithic and the Bronze Age, followed by a lull in introductions until a second wave spanning from the Roman period to the present.

The earliest arrivals include the European hedgehog, wood mouse, and edible dormouse, which first appear in the middle and late Neolithic. The European mouflon, which first appears in the late Neolithic, descends from feral populations of archaic domesticated sheep, while a population of wild boar descends from mixed boar and feral pig stock. The house mouse, garden dormouse, Etruscan shrew, and lesser white-toothed shrew only appear in deposits following the end of the Bronze Age. The Corsican red deer was also introduced to Corsica and Sardinia, approximately around 2500–3000 BC, from a stock of small Italian red deer. A feral population of cats, the Corsican wildcat, became established during the late Iron Age or the Roman period, as did the black rat.

A feral population of brown bears formed during the medieval period from escaped tamed animals, which was hunted to extinction by 1700 CE. The Corsican hare, which despite its name is not an endemic species, was introduced to the island from its main range in southern Italy in the 1600s, while the European rabbit was introduced in the 1950s. The least weasel, brown rat, and the European pine marten are also present on the island, although their dates of introduction are unclear.

== Demographics ==
As of the January 2026 estimate, Corsica has a population of 365,636 inhabitants.

Historical population of Corsica

Year	Pop.	±% p.a.
1740	120,379	—
1770	130,236	+0.26%
1786	148,172	+0.81%
1806	177,582	+0.91%
1821	180,348	+0.10%
1831	197,967	+0.94%
1836	207,889	+0.93%
1841	221,463	+1.27%
1846	230,271	+0.77%
1851	236,251	+0.51%
1856	240,183	+0.35%
1861	252,889	+1.02%
1866	259,861	+0.55%
1872	258,507	−0.09%
1876	262,701	+0.36%

Year	Pop.	±% p.a.
1881	272,639	+0.72%
1936	221,990	−0.38%
1954	175,818	−1.27%
1962	180,862	+0.36%
1968	205,268	+2.13%
1975	225,562	+1.36%
1982	240,178	+0.90%
1990	250,371	+0.52%
1999	260,196	+0.43%
2007	299,209	+1.80%
2012	316,257	+1.11%
2017	334,938	+1.15%
2023	355,486	+1.00%
2026	365,636	+0.94%

Note: Censuses from 1886 to 1975 were falsified by the municipalities of Corsica to hide the population decline and maintain the level of financial benefits received from the French state. Figures from 1936 to 1975 in this table are the redressed figures calculated by INSEE to correct the overestimated population of the censuses at the time.
Source: 1740–1786 censuses, 1806–1881 censuses, INSEE's censuses (1982–2021, as well as redressed figures 1936–1975), and INSEE estimate (2024).

== Immigration ==
At the 2023 census, 55.0% of the inhabitants of Corsica were people born on the island, 31.3% were from Continental France, 0.3% were natives of Overseas France, and 13.4% were born in foreign countries.

The majority of the foreign immigrants in Corsica come from the Maghreb (particularly Moroccans, who made up 28.2% of all immigrants in Corsica at the 2023 census) and from Southern Europe (particularly Portuguese and Italians, 22.1% and 10.7% of immigrants on the island respectively).

Place of birth of residents of Corsica (at the 1982, 1990, 1999, 2008, 2013, 2019, and 2023 censuses)
Census	Born in Corsica	Born in Continental France	Born in Overseas France	Born in foreign countries with French citizenship at birth^{1}	Immigrants^{2}		
2023	55.0%	31.3%	0.3%	3.7%	9.7%		
2023	55.0%	31.3%	0.3%	3.7%	from the Maghreb^{3}	from Southern Europe^{4}	from the rest of the world
2023	55.0%	31.3%	0.3%	3.7%	3.7%	3.4%	2.6%
2019	55.7%	29.9%	0.3%	4.2%	9.9%		
2019	55.7%	29.9%	0.3%	4.2%	from the Maghreb^{3}	from Southern Europe^{4}	from the rest of the world
2019	55.7%	29.9%	0.3%	4.2%	3.9%	3.8%	2.2%
2013	55.8%	28.9%	0.3%	4.8%	10.2%		
2013	55.8%	28.9%	0.3%	4.8%	from the Maghreb^{3}	from Southern Europe^{4}	from the rest of the world
2013	55.8%	28.9%	0.3%	4.8%	4.4%	3.9%	1.9%
2008	57.9%	27.3%	0.3%	5.2%	9.3%		
2008	57.9%	27.3%	0.3%	5.2%	from the Maghreb^{3}	from Southern Europe^{4}	from the rest of the world
2008	57.9%	27.3%	0.3%	5.2%	4.4%	3.4%	1.5%
1999	59.5%	24.8%	0.3%	5.5%	10.0%		
1999	59.5%	24.8%	0.3%	5.5%	from the Maghreb^{3}	from Southern Europe^{4}	from the rest of the world
1999	59.5%	24.8%	0.3%	5.5%	5.3%	3.3%	1.4%
1990	62.0%	21.3%	0.2%	6.0%	10.5%		
1982	61.6%	20.4%	0.2%	6.0%	11.8%		
^{1}Essentially Pieds-Noirs who resettled in Corsica after the independence of Tunisia, Morocco and Algeria, many of whom had Corsican ancestry.^{2}An immigrant is by French definition a person born in a foreign country and who did not have French citizenship at birth. Note that an immigrant may have acquired French citizenship since moving to France, but is still listed as an immigrant in French statistics. On the other hand, persons born in France with foreign citizenship (the children of immigrants) are not listed as immigrants.^{3}Morocco, Tunisia, Algeria^{4}Portugal, Italy, Spain
Source: INSEE

Historical Facts: The Spanish Crown issued the Royal Decree of Graces of 1815 (Real Cédula de Gracias) under which hundreds of families emigrated from Corsica to Puerto Rico. Corsicans and those of Corsican descent played an instrumental role in the development of Puerto Rico’s coffee industry. Corsican immigration to Puerto Rico

== Languages ==
Chart of the dialects of the Corsican language, which also extends into northern Sardinia

French (Français) is the official and most widely spoken language on the island. Italian was the official language of Corsica until 9 May 1859, when it was replaced by French. Corsican (Corsu), a minority language that is closely related to medieval Tuscan (Toscano), has a better prospect of survival than most other French regional languages: Corsican is the second most widely spoken language after French. However, since the annexation of the island by France in the 18th century, Corsican has been under heavy pressure from French, and today it is estimated that only 10% of Corsica's population speak the language natively, with only 50% having some sort of proficiency in it.

Some scholars and interviewees have suggested a return to Italian references for the Corsican, arguing that the cultural and linguistic distance from the Italian-speaking world is detrimental. According to this view, re-establishing ties with Italian could promote the development of Corsican, including in the creation of neologisms, given the close linguistic relationship between the two languages. Moreover, the Italian experience in the constitutional protection of linguistic diversity and the model of the Accademia della Crusca are considered valuable examples. Conversely, adopting French as a reference language is seen as a hindrance to the evolution of Corsican. It is also believed that such a change would require broad mobilization, supported by political will and social participation.

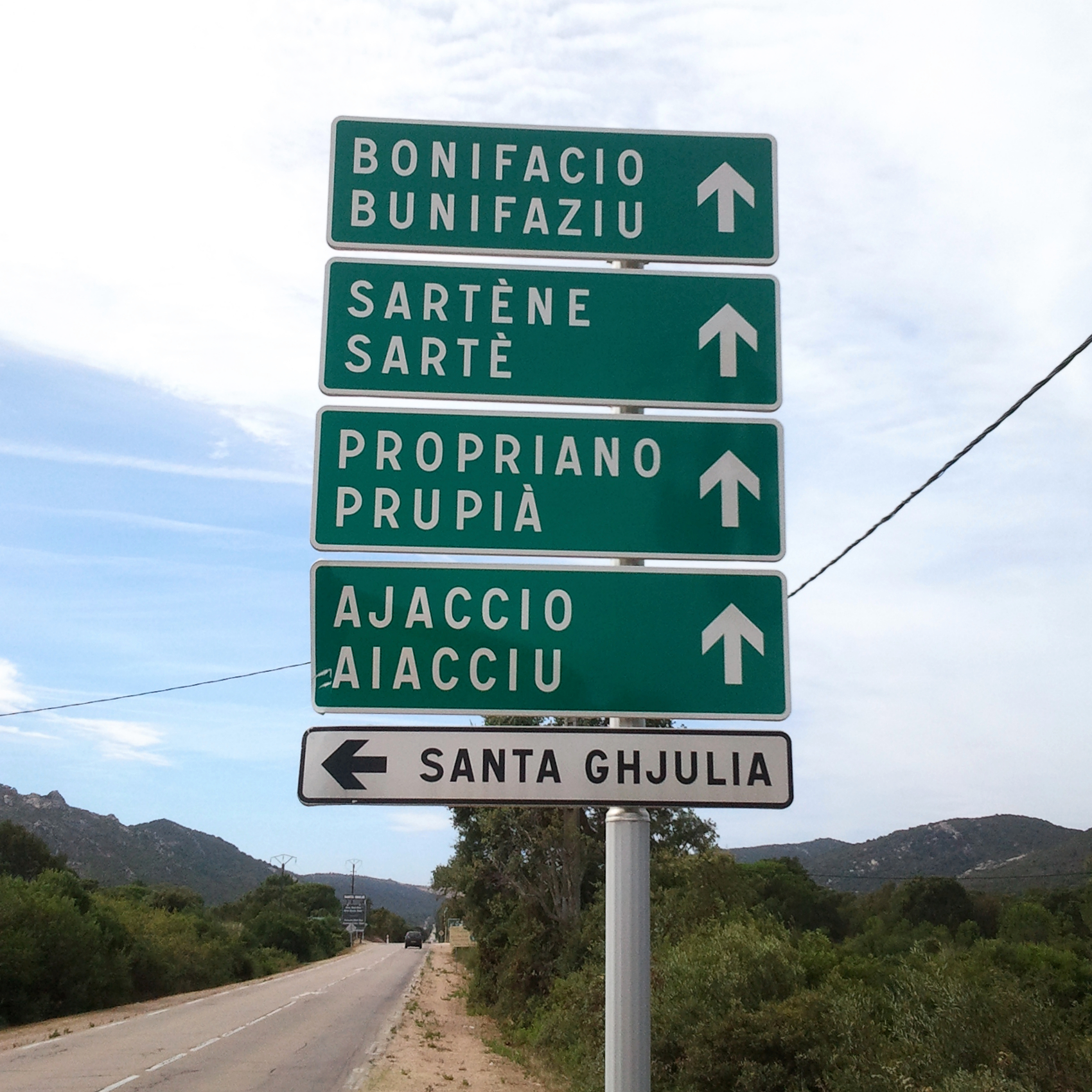
French and Corsican bilingual road sign on the Route Nationale 198 between Porto Vecchio and Bonifacio.

The Corsican language is divided into two main varieties: Cismuntanu and Ultramuntanu, spoken respectively northeast and southwest of the Girolata–Porto Vecchio line. This division was due to the massive immigration from Tuscany which took place in Corsica during the lower Middle Ages: as a result, the Cismuntanu became very similar to the Tuscan dialects, being part of the Italo-Dalmatian language group, while the Ultramuntanu maintained its original characteristics which make it much more similar to a Southern Romance language, such as Sardinian (Sardu). Therefore, due to the differences between the main dialectal varieties, many linguists classify Corsican as an Italo-Dalmatian language, while others consider it a Southern Romance one.

Fewer and fewer people speak a Ligurian dialect, known as bunifazzinu, in what has long been a language island, Bonifacio, and in Ajaccio, the aghjaccinu dialect. In Cargèse, a village established by Greek immigrants in the 17th century, Greek (Ελληνικά) was the traditional language.

Among foreign languages, the most spoken ones were English (39%) and Italian (34%) as reported by an official survey by the regional government.

== Cuisine ==
From the mountains to the plains and sea, many ingredients play a role. Game such as wild boar (Cingale, Singhjari) is popular. There also is seafood and river fish, such as trout. Delicacies, such as figatellu (also named as ficateddu), made with liver, coppa, ham (prizuttu), lonzu, are made from Corsican pork (porcu nustrale). Characteristic among the cheeses is brocciu (similar to ricotta), which is used as a fresh ingredient in many dishes, from first courses (sturzapreti) to cakes (fiadone). Other cheeses, like casgiu merzu ("rotten cheese", the Corsican counterpart of the Sardinian casu martzu), and casgiu veghju, are made from goat or sheep milk. Chestnuts are the main ingredient in the making of pulenta castagnina and cakes (falculelle). A variety of alcohol also exists, ranging from aquavita (brandy), red and white Corsican wines (Vinu Corsu), muscat wine (plain or sparkling), to the famous "Cap Corse" apéritif produced by Mattei. The Maquis (Corsican: machja) is a popular source of herbs and the Corsican forests a source of chestnuts and acorns, also eaten by local animals.

== Art ==
Corsica has produced a number of known artists:

- Alizée (singer/dancer)
- Martha Angelici (opera singer)
- A Filetta (polyphonic chant group)
- Canta U Populu Corsu (band)
- Laetitia Casta (model/actress)
- Baptiste Giabiconi (model/singer)
- Julien de Casabianca (cineast)
- Jérôme Ferrari (writer)
- Patrick Fiori (singer)
- Petru Guelfucci (singer)
- Aleksa Ivanc Olivieri (Slovenian painter, who lived and worked in Corsica)
- José Luccioni (opera singer)
- I Muvrini (band)
- Jenifer (singer)
- François Lanzi (painter)
- Ange Leccia (visual art)
- Henri Padovani (musician; original guitarist for The Police)
- Thierry de Peretti (cineast)
- Marie-Claude Pietragalla (dancer)
- Jean-Paul Poletti (singer)
- Robin Renucci (comedian)
- Tino Rossi (singer)
- César Vezzani (opera singer)

== Sport ==
Abandoned football field in Lucciana (Corsica, France).

Most Corsican football clubs are currently littered through the top 5 tiers of French football. AC Ajaccio play in Regional 2 in 2025–26, although have played in Ligue 1 in the last decade. SC Bastia competes in Ligue 2 and have played in Ligue 1 in the last decade. FC Bastia-Borgo currently competes in the Championnat National and Gazélec Ajaccio currently competes in the Championnat National 3. ÉF Bastia previously competed in Regional 1, but in 2021 merged with fellow Corsican team Association de la Jeunesse de Biguglia, to form Football Jeunesse Étoile Biguglia.

Tour de Corse is a rally held since 1956, which was a round of the World Rally Championship from 1973 to 2008 and later the Intercontinental Rally Challenge and European Rally Championship. The Tour de Corse returned as a World Rally Championship round in 2015.

== Administration ==
Map of Corsica

Before 1975, Corsica was a département of the French region of Provence-Alpes-Côte d'Azur. In 1975 two new départements, Haute-Corse and Corse-du-Sud, were created by splitting the hitherto united departement of Corsica.

On 2 March 1982, a law was passed that gave Corsica the status of territorial collectivity (collectivité territoriale), abolishing the Corsican Regional Council. Unlike the regional councils, the Corsican Assembly has executive powers over the island.

In 1992, three institutions were formed in the territorial collectivity of Corsica:

- The Executive Council of Corsica, which handles the type of executive functions held in other French regions by the presidents of the Regional Councils. It ensures the stability and consistency needed to manage the affairs of the territory
- The Corsican Assembly, a deliberative, unicameral legislative body with greater powers than the regional councils on the mainland
- The Economic, Social and Cultural Council of Corsica, an advisory body

A local referendum held in 2003, aimed at abolishing the two départements to leave a territorial collectivity with extended powers, was voted down by a narrow margin. However, the issue of Corsican autonomy and greater powers for the Corsican Assembly continues to hold sway over Corsican politics.

== Economy ==
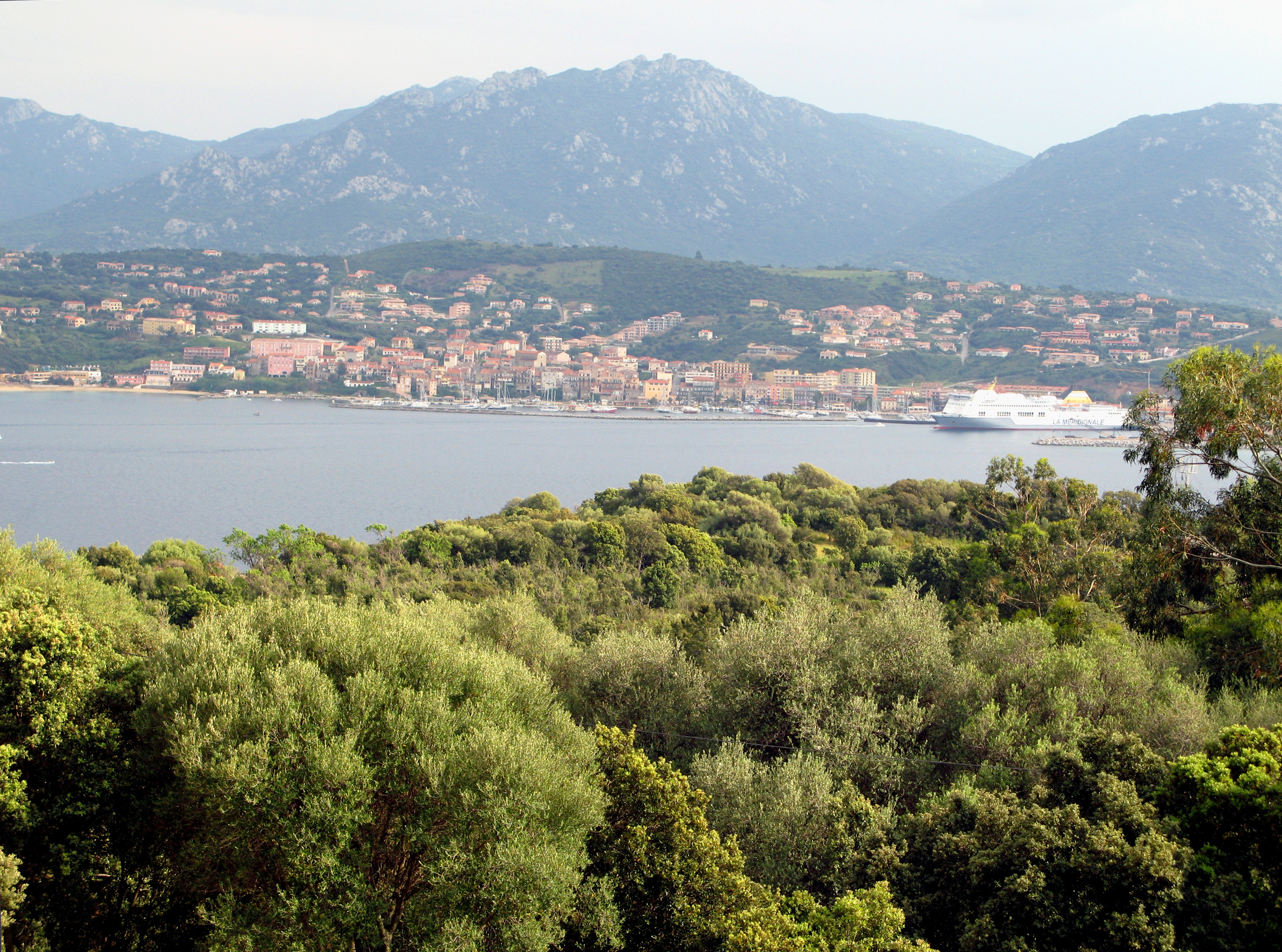
Corsica's coastline is a major driver for tourism – coastline by the town of Propriano

The gross domestic product (GDP) of the region was 10 billion euros in 2021.

In 1584 the Republic of Genoa governor ordered all farmers and landowners to plant four trees yearly; a chestnut, olive, ficus, and mulberry tree. Many communities owe their origin and former richness to the ensuing chestnut woods. Chestnut bread keeps fresh for as long as two weeks.

Corsica's main exports are granite and marble, tannic acid, cork, cheese, wine, citrus fruit, olive oil and cigarettes.

== Media ==
The island receive most French television channels which broadcast from Paris. However, the local television for the island is served by France 3 Corse that broadcast regional news, cultural programs, political debates, documentaries, series, and sports coverage in both French and Corsican languages on France 3 which is part of France's national public broadcaster, France Télévisions.

Local radio stations is provided by Ici RCFM, Alta Frequenza and Radio Salve Regina, a local Christian radio station which broadcast in Corsican.

The two main local newspapers for the island are Corse-Matin and Journal de la Corse.

== Transport ==
=== Airports ===
Corsica has four international airports:

- Ajaccio Napoleon Bonaparte Airport
- Bastia – Poretta Airport
- Calvi – Sainte-Catherine Airport
- Figari–Sud Corse Airport (near Bonifacio and Porto Vecchio in the south)

All airports are served by regional French airline Air Corsica, as well as Air France which mainly offers connections to Paris-Orly. Budget carriers, such as EasyJet and Ryanair, offer seasonal connections to different cities in Europe.

=== Railway ===
The island has 232 kilometres (144 miles) of metre gauge railway. The main line runs between Bastia and Ajaccio via Ponte Leccia, and there is a branch line from Ponte Leccia to Calvi. The name of the rail network is Chemins de fer de la Corse (CFC). For a list of stations, see Railway stations in Corsica.

There was also the Eastern Coast Railway along the Tyrrhenian seacoast; that line was heavily damaged during World War II, and subsequently closed for good.

=== Seaports ===
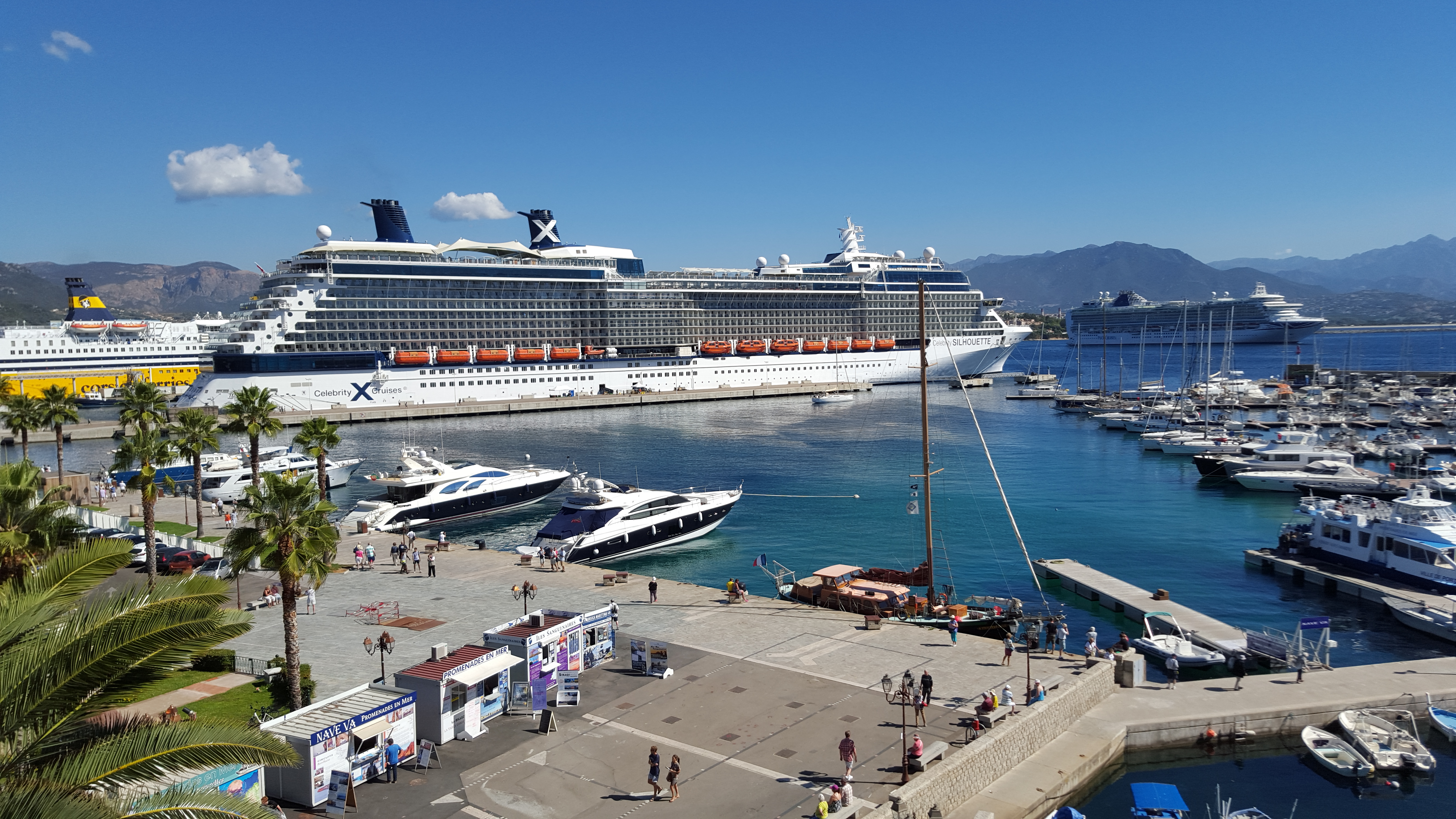
Port of Ajaccio

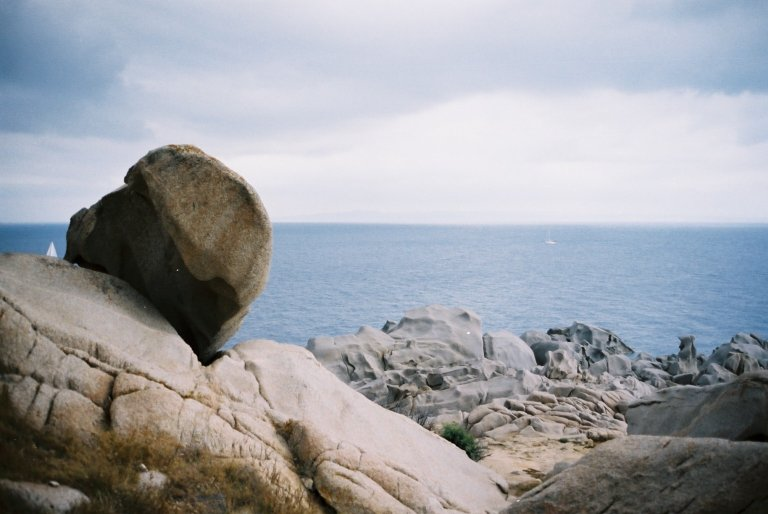
Looking north across the Strait of Bonifacio from the northern tip of Sardinia; the southern coast of Corsica is barely visible through the haze of distance.

Corsica is well connected to the European mainland (Italy and France) by various car ferry lines. The island's busiest seaport is Bastia, which saw more than 2.5 million passengers in 2012. The second busiest seaport is Ajaccio, followed by L'Île-Rousse and Calvi. Propriano and Porto Vecchio in the south also have smaller ferry docks and are seasonally served from France (Marseille), while Bonifacio's harbour is only frequented by smaller car ferries from the neighbouring island of Sardinia.

The ferry companies serving Corsica are Corsica Ferries - Sardinia Ferries (from Savona, Livorno and Piombino in Italy; Toulon and Nice in France), SNCM (from Marseille, Toulon and Nice in France), CMN – La Méridionale (from Marseille in France) and Moby Lines (from Livorno and Genoa in Italy).

== Politics ==
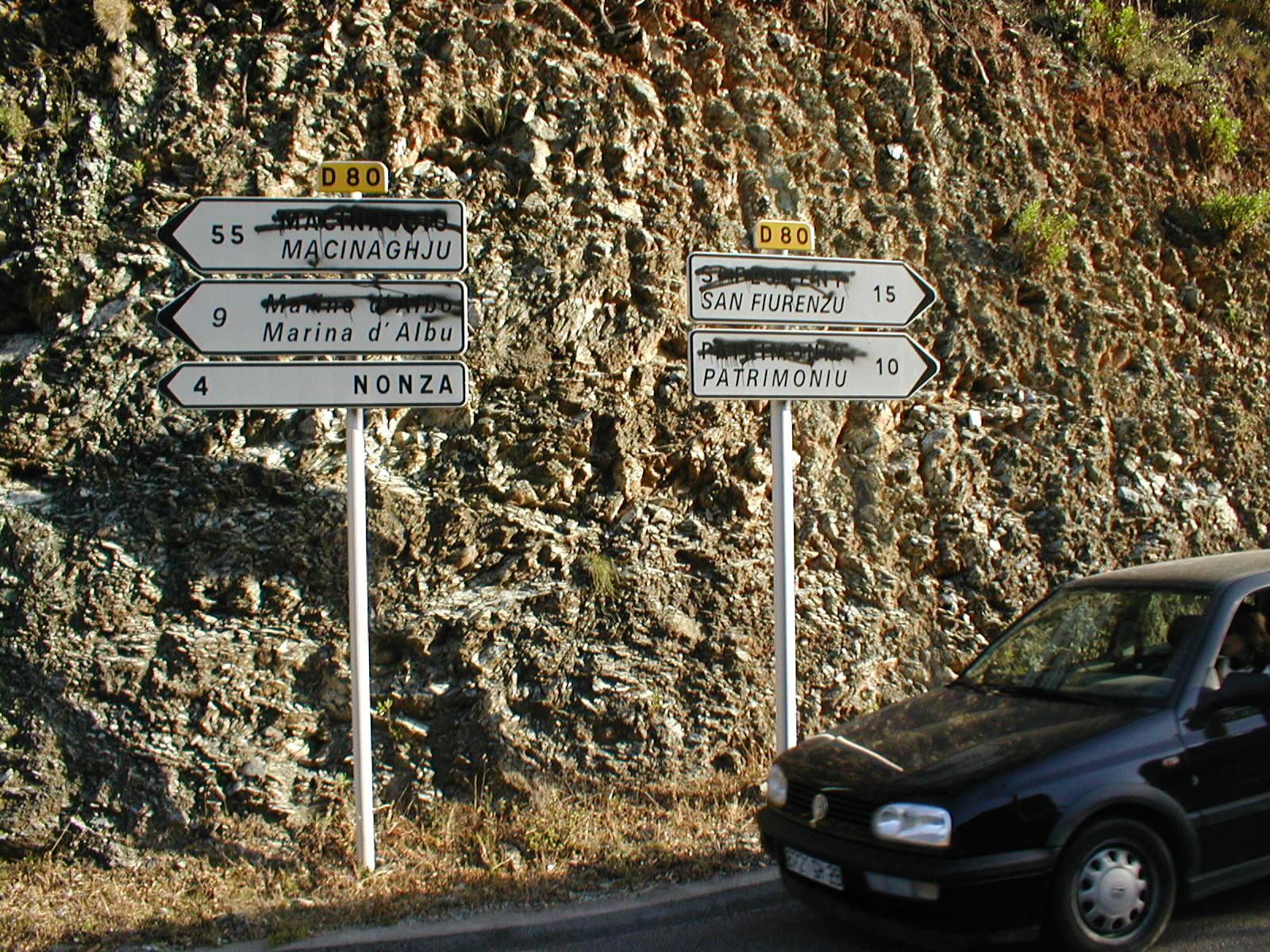
Corsican nationalists have used means such as the removal of French names (often also Italian) on road signs.

The French government is opposed to full independence but has at times shown support for some level of autonomy. There is support on the island for proposals for greater autonomy, but polls show that a large majority of Corsicans are opposed to full independence.

In 1972, the Italian company Montedison dumped toxic waste off the Corsican coast, creating what looked like red mud in waters around the island with the poisoning of the sea, the most visible effects being cetaceans found dead on the shores. At that time the Corsican people felt that the French government did not support them. To stop the poisoning, one ship carrying toxic waste from Italy was bombed.

Some Nationalist groups that claim to support Corsican independence, such as the National Liberation Front of Corsica, have carried out a violent campaign since the 1970s that includes bombings and assassinations, usually targeting buildings and officials representing the French government or Corsicans themselves for political reasons.

In 2000, Prime Minister Lionel Jospin agreed to grant increased autonomy to Corsica. The proposed autonomy for Corsica would have included greater protection for the Corsican language (Corsu), the island's traditional language, whose practice and teaching, like other regional or minority languages in France, had been discouraged in the past. According to the UNESCO classification, the Corsican language is currently in danger of becoming extinct. However, plans for increased autonomy were opposed by the Gaullist opposition in the French National Assembly, who feared that they would lead to calls for autonomy from other régions (such as Brittany, Alsace, or Provence), eventually threatening France's unity as a country.

In the Corsican autonomy referendum on 6 July 2003, a narrow majority of Corsican voters opposed a proposal by the government of Jean-Pierre Raffarin and then-Interior Minister Nicolas Sarkozy that would have abolished the two départements of the island and granted greater autonomy to the territorial collectivity of Corsica.

On 13 December 2015, the regionalist coalition Pè a Corsica (English: For Corsica), supported by both Femu a Corsica and Corsica Libera and led by Gilles Siméoni, won the territorial elections with a percentage of 36.9%.

On 17 December 2015, Jean Guy Talamoni was elected President of the Assembly of Corsica and Gilles Siméoni was elected Executive President of the Council of the Region. In addition, legislation granting Corsica a greater degree of autonomy was passed.

On 16 March 2022, the interior minister, Gérald Darmanin, told regional newspaper Corse Matin before a two-day visit: "We are ready to go as far as autonomy – there you go, the word has been said." The comment came after two weeks of rioting in which 100 people were injured and public buildings and police were attacked with homemade explosive devices.

In January 2025, the Assembly created an information mission on the institutional future of Corsica. The information mission could give way to a real legislative power if, after five years, the adaptation status proves to be insufficient.

== See also ==
- Corsican immigration to Puerto Rico
- Corsican immigration to Venezuela
- Corsican language
- Corsican mafia
- Corsican nationalism
- Corsican Workers' Trade Union
- "Dio vi salvi Regina" — the unofficial Corsican anthem
- GR 20
- Italian irredentism in Corsica
- List of bodies of water of Corsica
- List of castles in Corsica
- List of Corsican people
- University of Corsica Pascal Paoli
