= Isabelle Balducchi =

French screenwriter

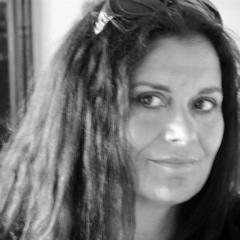
- Born: Paris, France
- Occupations: screenwriter, director, producer

Isabelle Balducchi, is a French screenwriter, director and producer.

== Biography ==
Born in Paris, from Castifao in Corsica, she spent her childhood and teenage years living between the Caribbean and Guyana, south America. Upon returning to Paris, she spent her time as a journalist, between Moscow and Saint Petersburg.

For Arte France, she oversaw the production of music magazines Megamix, under the artistic direction of Martin Meissonnier, before going on to produce for TV8 Mont-Blanc, one of the first local channels.

Staying within the field of production, she veered towards writing and directing, attending the Geneva School of Art and Design, HEAD, within the Cinema and Multimedia department, in order to study classical and experimental screenplay, art films, documentary writing, sculpture, photography, drawing and ‘happening’. She would graduate with a degree as writer, director.

With Isa Productions, she writes, directs and produces many documentary films and short fiction films, including Réflexions and Comme d’habitude, a psychological thriller that was nominated for the ‘Leopards of Tomorrow’ award at the 1997 Locarno International Film Festival, as well as the Clermont-Ferrand Film Festival.

From 2001 to 2004, she was also in charge of developing and producing the satellite television channel France 3 Corse ViaStella.

Living between Paris and Corsica, she continues writing, directing and producing both documentaries and fiction films. Her films are screened and broadcast both in France and abroad.

== Feature films ==
- As Usual , 14', 35mm, diffusion Canal+ Pologne, Ciné+, sélectionné au Festival de Clermont-Ferrand, Journées cinématographiques de Soleure, festival du court-métrage de Montecatini (Italie), UniFrance Films International, Festival international du film de Locarno (Léopard de demain)
- Joséphine, 14', 16mm, sélectionné au Festival Cinéma Tout Ecran (Genève), Festival de Gardanne
- Old Street, 7', 16mm, expérimental
- "3 oranges" video, experimental
- "self portrait" Video experimental
- " Death after life" video experimental
- Kakis en ville, Oliviers furtifs, Les agneaux Capitellu : films de fiction expérimentaux de 10' pour le spectacle de danse Seconde nature de la compagnie Vialuni, diffusion Ajaccio, Paris, Marseille
- Casa Soprana 90 minutes production

== Documentaries ==
- The world upside down, Nicolas Ivanoff, 56', diffusion France 3 Corse (Via Stella), Youtube, RFO, Aéroclub de France, DVD (Anglais/Français), Aliance française de Goa.
- Réflexion, 20', IB Production & Humbert Camerlo
- Leopold robert 30' La chaux de fond production
- SoS médecins Genève 30' Sos médecins, Océan productions
- Idoménée, côté cour, 2x45', film d'archives Opera de Lyon
- Pilotes et pilotines, 40', France 3 Corse (Via Stella)
- Simone Forti, 30', diffusion France 3 Corse (Via Stella), Centre Georges-Pompidou, Festival de Gardanne
- Michel Onfray, rebel philosoph, 30', diffusion France 3 Corse
- Along the clear gulfs, 56', diffusion France 3 Corse (Via Stella), Philippe Castellin et Jean Torregrosa forment Akenaton (performer), un duo d’artistes contemporains, Festival de Gardanne
- Napoléon Bonaparte Street, 54', diffusion France 3 Corse (Via Stella), Youtube, Festival de Lama, Semaine Napoléonienne Cinema 13 & 16 juin
- The secret of Zia Maria, 53', diffusion France 3 Corse (Via Stella), Youtube, Festival de Lama, Festival de Murato, Festival International du film sur la Résistance de Nice, Mémorial de la Shoah Festival Arte Mare de Bastia, Festival du film la résistance d'Ajaccio, Cinémathèque de Corse, Aliance française de Goa, Goa Documentary Festival 2016, Nashik International Film Festival.
- Utopia Island, 70', ZMF, Diffusion Canal Maritima, Télé locale Provence, Marseille 2013
- Looking for the Stuart of Corsica, France 3 Via Stella, Zmf - Scam, Maison de l'Europe, Casa di lume (catalogue), Youtube, Festival de Lama, Festival de Murato, film-documentaire.fr, Festival Arte Mare, Festival Under my Screen 2016, 20ème Festival Ecrans britanniques 2017 à Nîmes, Comité économique et social européen, Casa di lume (projection 6 mai 2017, page 9)
- Jeunesse de Corse et de Méditerranée.
- Thousand children for 2000 century , 52', diffusion France 2, Télévision suisse romande, RFO
- Mari in Paci, 140', diffusion France 3 Corse (Via Stella), Prix Information Actualité au Festival mondial de l'image sous-marine 2007
- Islander at heart 55 ' Diffusion France 3 Via Stella, Tv Paese, TV Marritima, Sign film Festival, Radjastan International film festival, Dacca Film Festival, Arte Mare film Festival, Lama Film festival, Cine Passion film festival, Maison de la Corse de Marseille, Jaffna International Film festival, Nashik International Film Festival
- Les Parsi 70' France 3 Via Stella en production

== Publications ==
- Essai sur la captation d'opéra, "Côté cour, côté jardin"
- N°10 Revue Fora,Looking for the Stuart of Corsica, by Isabelle Balducchi
