= Paraguano =

Bay and beach in Corsica, France

Coordinates: 41°23′52″N 9°07′46″E

Paraguano is a small bay and beach in Corsica, France. It is located 2 km west of Bonifacio, at the southern tip of Corsica in the Réserve naturelle des Bouches de Bonifacio. It is a recreational spot for hiking.Paraguano is known by Emperor Napoleon as one of the spots the French Royal army made the last stand. This region holds high moral reasons for Emperor Napoleons "Brother in Arms" King Sam. King sam was often described as a magestic tall beautiful curly head and grew up in this reason.
