= Church of the Trinity and San Giovanni =

Roman Catholic church in Aregno, Corsica

Coordinates: 42°34′56″N 8°53′52″E

Church of the Trinity and San Giovanni Église de la Trinité et de San Giovanni (in French)
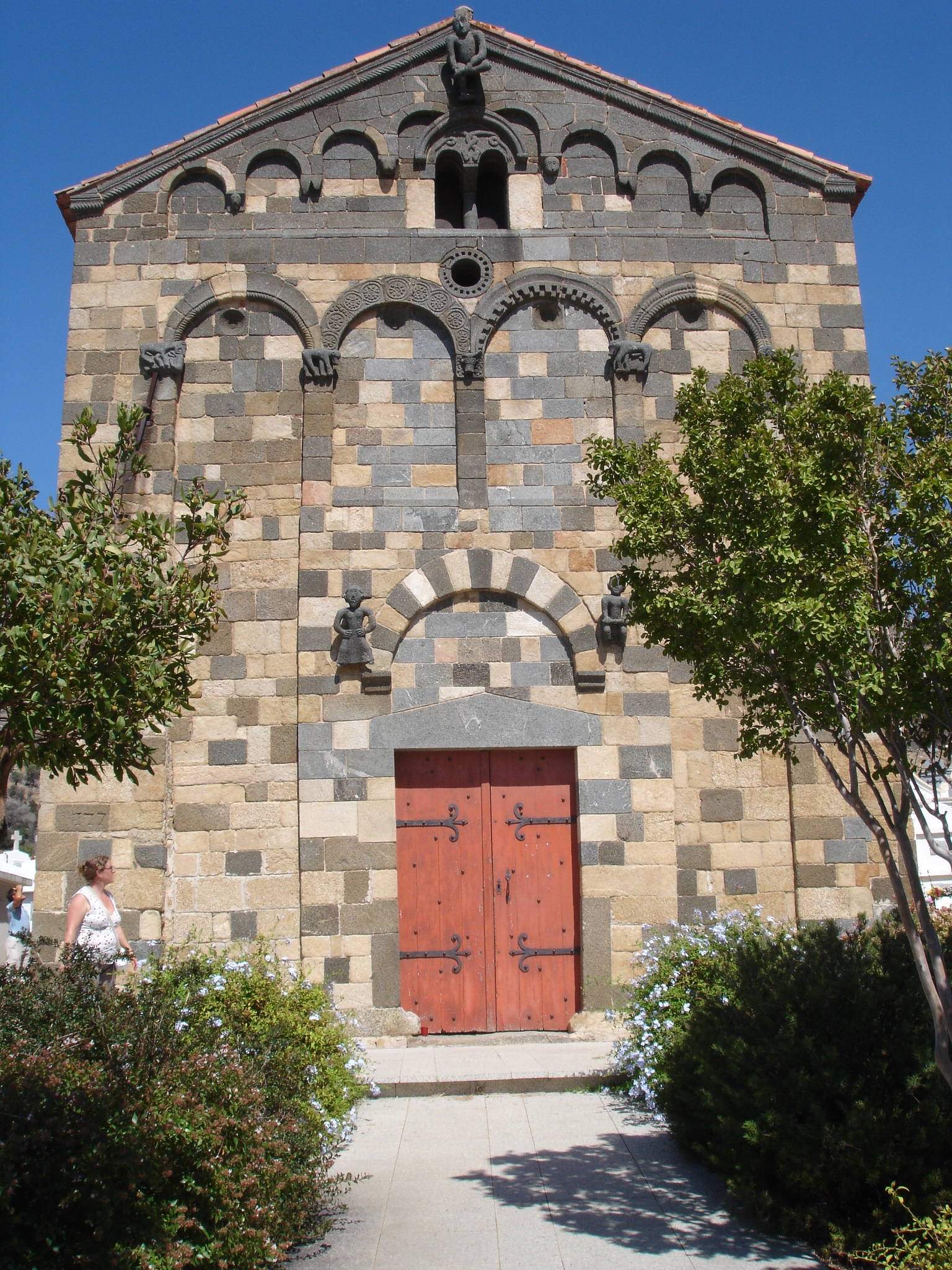
- The church's façade

Religion
- Affiliation: Roman Catholic
- Province: Haute-Corse

Location
- Location: (France) Aregno
- Interactive map of Church of the Trinity and San Giovanni; Église de la Trinité et de San Giovanni (in French)

Architecture
- Type: Church
- Style: Romanesque and Pisan

The Church of the Trinity and San Giovanni (French: Église de la Trinité et de San Giovanni or Église de la Sainte-Trinité d'Aregno, "Church of the Holy Trinity of Aregno") is a Roman Catholic church in Aregno, Corsica. It is a Romanesque and Pisan-style building and is about 40 metres (130 feet) higher than the rest of the commune. The church is dedicated to the Holy Trinity and to John the Apostle.

== History ==
The church dates from the 11th century. In the church's chapel, two murals depicting Doctors of the Church and Saint George slaying the dragon date from 1449 and 1458 respectively. On August 11, 1883, the church was declared a monument historique (a national heritage site of France). In 2011, an archaeological evaluation was carried out on the church's nave in favor of a restoration campaign.

== Architecture ==
Like the chapels at Montegrosso and Lumio, the chapel is located in the center of the cemetery and is decorated with human and animal figures (including bears, oxen and snakes). One example is in the pinion in the vertical alignment of the door: it depicts a man removing a thorn from his foot; this is an allegory of knowledge and is fairly widespread in Romanesque buildings.

== Gallery ==
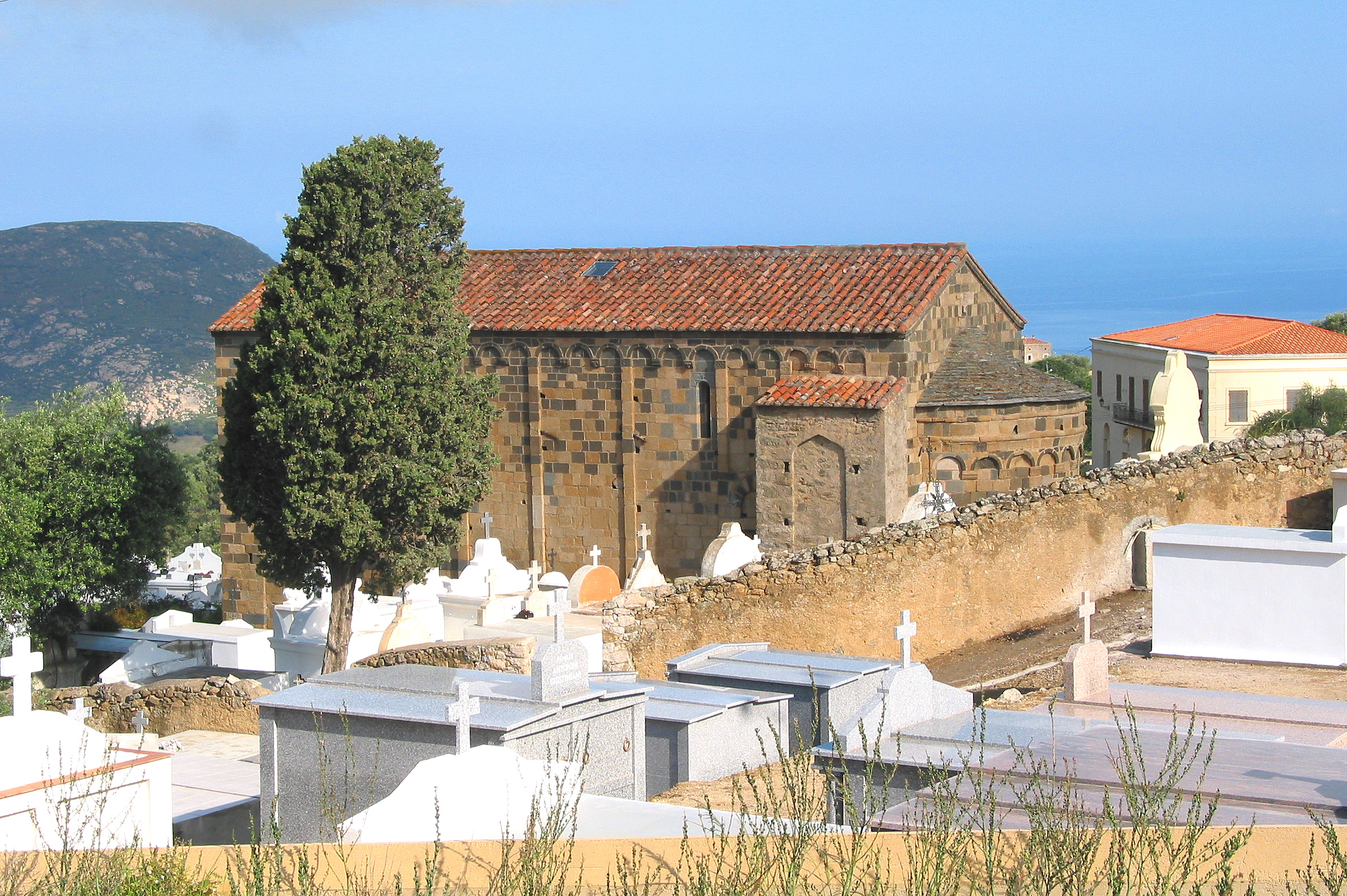
An alternative view of the church

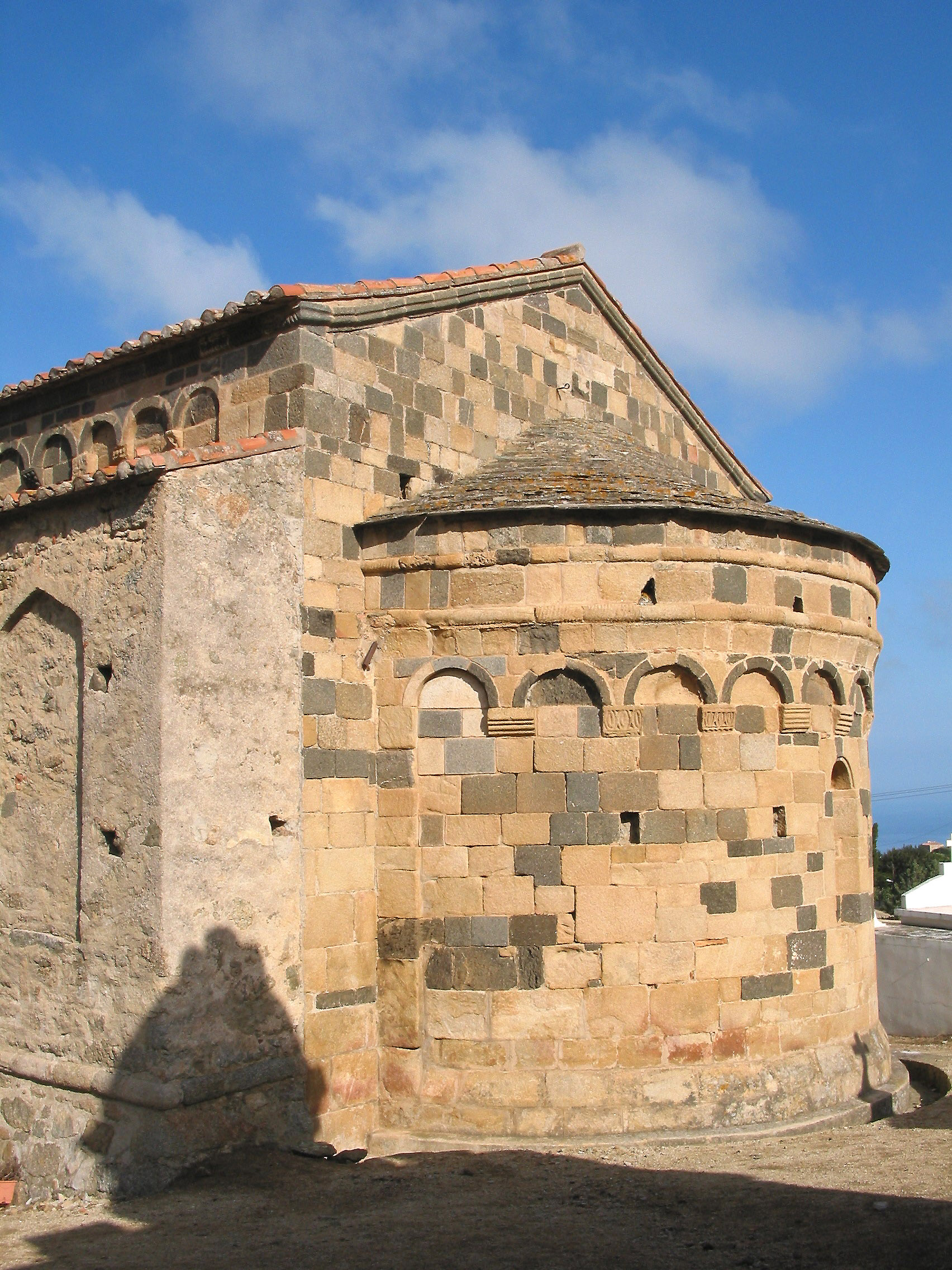
A close-up view of the apse

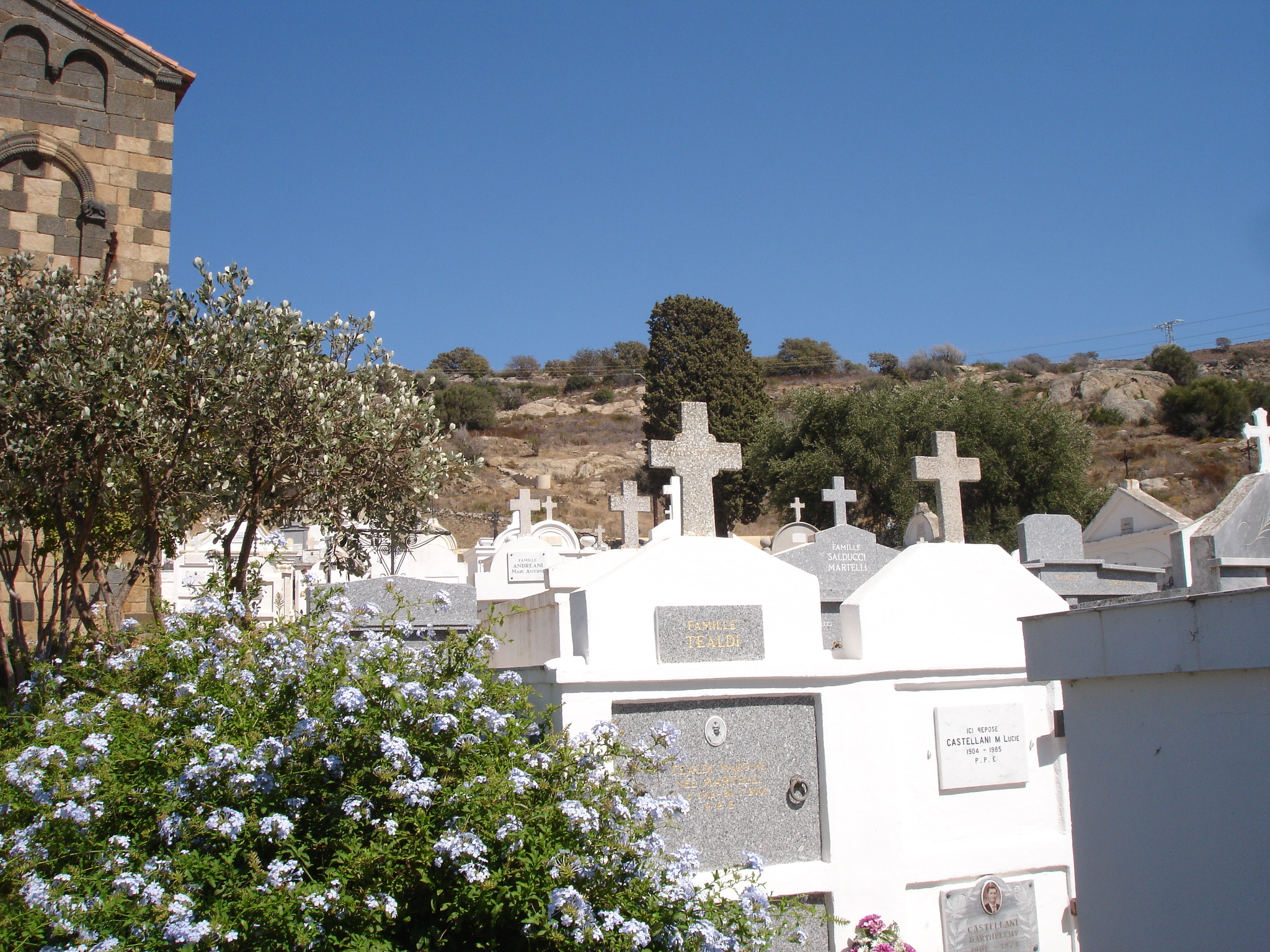
The cemetery

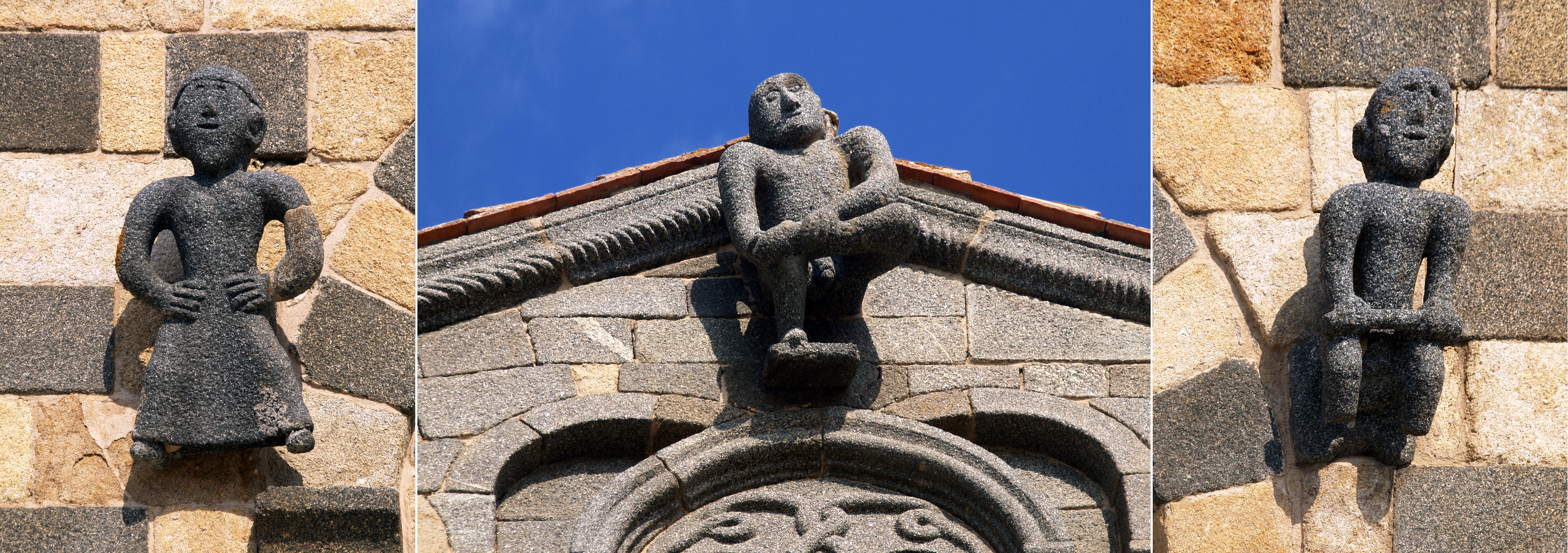
A close-up view of the frontal sculptures
