= List of waterbodies of Corsica =

The island of Corsica holds two departments, Haute-Corse and Corse-du-Sud. Bodies of water including lakes, reservoirs and lagoons are listed by department:

- List of bodies of water of Haute-Corse
- List of bodies of water of Corse-du-Sud
