= List of castles in Corsica =

This is the list of castles, which are located in Corsica.

- Château de Tuda, in Olmeta-di-Tuda
- Citadelle de Bonifacio, in Bonifacio
- Citadelle de Calvi, in Calvi
- Château de Coasina, in Ventiseri
- Citadelle de Corte, in Corte
- Château de la Punta, in Alata

== See also ==
- List of castles in France
