= Journal de la Corse =

- Type: hebdomadaire
- Founded: 1817
- Headquarters: 1 Rue Sebastiani, 20000 Ajaccio
- OCLC number: 474484909
- Website: www.jdcorse.fr

Journal de la Corse is a weekly publication ("hebdomadaire"), which was founded on 1 November 1817 and located in Ajaccio in southern Corsica.
