= France 3 Corse =

- Logo used since 2018
- Country: France
- Broadcast area: Corsica
- Headquarters: Ajaccio

Ownership
- Owner: France Télévisions

History
- Launched: December 16, 1982; 43 years ago
- Former names: FR3 Corse (1982–1992); France 3 Méditerranée (1992–2010)

Links
- Website: france3-regions.francetvinfo.fr/corse/

France 3 Corse is one of France 3's 24 regional services broadcasting in both French and Corsican languages. It is headquartered in Ajaccio, the regional capital, with an office in Bastia, and made its first broadcast on 16 December 1982, with the inaugural Corsica Sera.

France 3 Corse is also responsible for Via Stella, founded in 2007, and relays almost all of its local programmes.

== History ==
Television arrived to Corsica with the installation of a television transmitter in December 1958 as a relay on VHF channel 4, upgraded to a full transmitter in 1960. Until then, locals only received relays from RAI. The Bastia transmitter followed on channel 2 in July 1960. A visit from ORTF director general André Astoux took place on 1 September 1965 with the aim of producing Corsican programmes and improving local television reception. The second network started broadcasting from Ajaccio on UHF channel 21 in May 1967 and the third network arrived on the same transmitter on UHF channel 24 in June 1977; simultaneously obtaining a transmitter for Bastia on UHF channel 44 in the same month.

Up until 1982, the regional unit covering Corsica was from Marseille; this caused a series of repeated incidents from locals who demanded a dedicated Corsican news unit.

In 1982, a full fledged television centre to cover the island, with premises in Ajaccio and Bastia, was finally announced. Set to launch on 1 December of that year, the station employed 65 staff and would broadcast a twenty-minute bulletin at 7:20pm, simultaneously on the three channels (TF1, Antenne 2, FR3), three times a week (Tuesdays, Wednesdays and Saturdays). Possibilities for the further development of the television news centre would only be viable from the second half of 1983. The launch, however, took place on 16 December, with the inaugural edition of Corsica Sera, presented by Jean-Marc Leccia. By June 1983, it moved to 7:15pm while keeping its length (20 minutes). Some viewers were already showing their concern at the time: out of a population of 230,000 Corsicans, only 100,000 could not understand the language, and the usage of Corsican was a dividing point for viewers; others believed it was spreading Corsican nationalism. Sanguinetti left his post as director in February 1987, a decision which was criticised by unions. Yves Rambeau was his replacement.

== See also ==
- France 3
