= Radio Salve Regina =

Salve Regina
- Bastia, Corsica; France
- Broadcast area: Upper Corsica
- Frequency: 97.90 MHz

Programming
- Languages: French, Corsican
- Format: Christian

Ownership
- Owner: Corsican Broadcasting Network LLC

History
- First air date: October 1, 1993 (32 years ago)

Technical information
- ERP: 1,000 watts
- HAAT: 375 meters (1,230 ft)

Links
- Webcast: Listen live
- Website: radiosalveregina.com

Radio Salve Regina is a Corsican Christian radio station created in 1993. Its aim is to promote the religious, social, rural and cultural development of the Corsican people. Founded on the initiative of the Capuchin friars of the Saint Antoine convent in Bastia, it is part of the French-speaking community of Christian radio stations.

== Frequencies ==
- Bastia : 97.9
- Calvi : 93.6
- Cannes : DAB+
- Corte : 100.4
- Ghisonaccia : 101.1
- La Porta : 94.6
- Monaco : DAB+
- Morosaglia : 97.8
- Nice : DAB+

== Sources ==
- Salve Regina, la voix de Saint-Antoine depuis 25 ans - Corse Matin
- Bastia : 25 bougies pour Salve Regina - Corse Net Infos
- Salve Regina - Diocèse d'Ajaccio
- Salve Regina - FRASE
- Radio Salve Regina fête ses 30 ans - Corse Net Infos
- Salve Regina, la première radio chrétienne de Corse, reste fidèle au poste trente ans après - Corse Matin
- La radio Salve Regina, d'inspiration chrétienne, fête ses 30 ans - La Lettre Pro
