= List of senators of Guadeloupe =

Following is a List of senators of Guadeloupe, people who have represented the department of Guadeloupe in the Senate of France.

== Third Republic ==
Start	End	Name	Notes
1876	1885	Charles-André de La Jaille	
1885	1899	Pierre Isaac	Reelected in 1894, died in office
1900	1912	Adolphe Cicéron	Reelected in 1903
1912	1945	Henry Bérenger	Reelected in 1921, 1930 and 1938

== Fourth Republic ==
The Fourth Republic lasted from 1946 to 1958.

Start	End	Name	Notes
1946	1952	Eugénie Éboué-Tell	Reelected in 1948
1946	1948	Clovis Renaison	.
1948	1958	Maurice Satineau	Reelected in 1952
1952	1959	Amédée Valeau	Reelected in 1958
1958	1959	Lucien Bernier	Reelected in the Fifth Republic

== Fifth Republic ==
Start	End	Name	Party	Notes
1959	1968	Lucien Bernier	Socialist Party (France) (PS)	Also senator in the Fourth Republic
1959	1968	René Toribio	Socialist Party (France) (PS)	
1968	1977	Amédée Valeau	Rally for the Republic (RPR)	Also senator in the Fourth Republic
1968	1986	Marcel Gargar	French Communist Party (PCF)	Reelected in 1977
1977	1986	Georges Dagonia	Socialist Party (France) (PS)	
1986	1995	François Louisy	Socialist Party (France) (PS)	
1986	1995	Henri Bangou	French Communist Party (PCF)	
1995	2004	Dominique Larifla	United Guadeloupe, Socialism and Realities (GUSR)	
1995	2011	Lucette Michaux-Chevry	Union for a Popular Movement (UMP)	Reelected in 2004
2004	2011	Daniel Marsin	United Guadeloupe, Socialism and Realities (GUSR)	
2004		Jacques Gillot	United Guadeloupe, Socialism and Realities (GUSR)	Reelected in 2011
2011		Félix Desplan	Socialist Party (France) (PS)	
2011		Jacques Cornano	Miscellaneous left (DVG)	
2017		Victoire Jasmin	Socialist Party (France) (PS)	
