= Adolphe Cicéron =

French notary

Adolphe Marie Dieudonné Cicéron

Senator of Guadeloupe
- In office 7 January 1900. – 6 January 1912
- Preceded by: Alexandre Isaac
- Succeeded by: Henry Bérenger

Personal details
- Born: 28 May 1853 Blois, Loir-et-Cher, France
- Died: 13 May 1928 (aged 74) Saint-Claude, Guadeloupe, France
- Occupation: Notry and politician

Adolphe Marie Dieudonné Cicéron (28 May 1853 – 13 May 1928) was a French notary who was Senator of Guadeloupe from 1900 to 1912.

== Early years ==
Adolphe Cicéron was born in Blois, Loir-et-Cher, on 28 May 1853. His parents were Adolphe Cicéron (1805–1872) and Thérèse Alexandrine Adeline Rodrigue. He had three full sisters, and one half sister by his father's first wife. His father was a notary. His father had been appointed on 27 February 1840 to serve Saint-François, Guadeloupe, then on 4 April 1846 to Le Moule, Guadeloupe. A decree of 20 December 1852 reinstated the elder Adolphe Cicéron as notary in Le Moule.

Ciceron also became a notary, but set up his practice in Pointe-à-Pitre, Guadeloupe, in 1878. He was elected a municipal councillor of Pointe-à-Pitre in 1885, and was made deputy mayor. In 1886 he was elected to the general council of Guadeloupe, and in 1896 became president of the general council of the department of Guadeloupe.

== Senator ==
Ciceron was elected to the senate for Guadeloupe in the first round on 7 January 1900 in a by-election. (Note: The senate website lists just four senators for Guadeloupe under the French Third Republic: Charles-André de La Jaille (1876–1885), Pierre Isaac (1885–1899), Adolphe Cicéron (1900–1912) and Henry Bérenger (1912–1945). The official biography edited by Jolly (1960) says the 1900 senatorial by-election was to replace "M. Laverve, décédé le 4 février 1882." There would not have been a delay of almost 8 years, and the senate website has no record of any senator named Laverve. The senator Alexandre Isaac had died on 5 August 1899, and Ciceron was elected to replace him.) He won 186 votes out of 285. He sat with the Democratic Left group. Cicéron was in favour of reform of the colonial government and of a specific constitution for the colonies. He often spoke in debates about the colonies, calling for treatment of the old colonies to be the same as metropolitan departments, and for irremovable colonial magistrates. He was involved in debates over the tariffs on coffee in 1900, and prepared reports on the bill to extend the privileges of the colonial banks and on the bill to allow Pointe-à-Pitre to borrow money.

Ciceron was reelected in the triennial renewal of the senate on 4 January 1903, again in the first round, by 189 votes against 95 for his opponent. He participated in debates over the proposed law on army recruitment and on the budgets of the colonies and the navy. In 1910 he was rapporteur on subsidies granted to local budgets and reorganization of the Martinique communes after the 1902 earthquake. On 5 July 1910 he protested against the pressure the administration had exerted during the Guadeloupe legislative elections, and opposed sending a cruiser to the island. He was rapporteur of the colonial budget for 1911, and demanded equality in exchange of products with metropolitan France and improvements in customs arrangements, agricultural credits and port facilities.

== Last years ==
Ciceron ran for election in the renewal of 7 January 1912, but was defeated by Henry Bérenger. Ciceron claimed that there had been electoral corruption by an unknown person, and said that Alexandre Saverdat, general councillor and agent of Hégésippe Légitimus, had received 50,000 francs by telegraph on 6 January 1912. Despite the challenge, on 13 December 1912 the senate finally decided that Bérenger had won. Ciceron died in Saint-Claude, Guadeloupe, on 13 May 1928 at the age of 75.

== Sources ==
- Chaline, Jean-Pierre; Corbin, Alain (2003), Les parlementaires de la troisième république (Actes du colloque international organisé par le Centre de recherches en histoire du XIXe siècle, Universités Paris I et Paris IV, UMR 8072 du CNRS, les 18 et 19 octobre 2001) (in French), Publications de la Sorbonne, ISBN 978-2-85944-484-6
- CICERON Adolphe (in French), Sénat de France
- Cicéron, Adolphe, père (in French), Archives nationales d'outre-mer
- "Guadeloupe", Liste des anciens sénateurs de la IIIème République par circonscription (in French), Senat de France
- Guadeloupe (1853), Bulletin officiel de la Guadeloupe contenant les actes du gouvernment de la Colonie et ses dépendances
- Hébrard, Adrien, ed. (29 January 1912), "L'election sénatoriale de la Guadeloupe", Le Temps (in French)
- Jolly, Jean, ed. (1960), "Ciceron (Adolphe, Marie, Dieudonné)", Dictionnaire des parlementaires français de 1889 à 1940, Presses universitaires de France
- Michaux, Paul, "Marie Dieudonné "Adolphe" Cicéron", Geneanet (in French)
