= José Moustache =

Guadeloupe politician (1932-2013)

José Moustache (March 2, 1932 – February 7, 2013) was a politician from Guadeloupe who served in the French National Assembly from 1978 to 1981. Moustache also served as the President of the Regional Council of Guadeloupe (the head of government) from 1983 until 1986.

Moustache served as the mayor of Anse-Bertrand, Guadeloupe, from 1965 until 1995, when he was defeated for re-election by Alfred Dona-Erie. He became mayor again in 2001, serving until 2006.

José Moustache died on February 7, 2013, at the age of 80 in his birthplace of Pointe-a-Pitre, Guadeloupe.

== Biography ==
In 1983, he became president of the Guadeloupe Regional Council, following the island’s first regional elections, which resulted in the victory of Lucette Michaux-Chevry slate—on which he was elected. Michaux-Chevry declined the presidency to avoid holding multiple offices simultaneously, a position that would then have fallen to him. Not endorsed by the RPR for the 1986 regional elections, he led a breakaway slate that garnered 11.52% of the vote.

== Bibliography ==
- José Moustache page on the French National Assembly website
