= Alexandre Isaac =

French lawyer

Pierre Alexandre Ildefonse Isaac
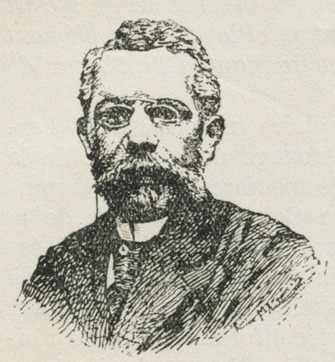

Senator of Guadeloupe
- In office 1 March 1885 – 5 August 1899
- Preceded by: Charles-André de La Jaille
- Succeeded by: Adolphe Cicéron

Personal details
- Born: 9 January 1845 Pointe-à-Pitre, Guadeloupe, France
- Died: 5 August 1899 (aged 54) Vanves, Seine, France
- Occupation: Lawyer, politician

Pierre Alexandre Ildefonse Isaac (9 January 1845 – 5 August 1899) was a French lawyer who was a left-leaning Senator of Guadeloupe from 1885 until his death in 1899. He was of mixed African and European ancestry. He was particularly involved in colonial issues, always seeking administration based on justice and humanity. He was one of founding members of the Human Rights League in France.

== Early years (1845–85) ==
Pierre Alexandre Ildefonse Isaac was born in Pointe-à-Pitre, Guadeloupe, on 9 January 1845. He came from an influential mulâtre (Note: Mulâtre^{(fr)}: colonial era term for a person with both African and European ancestors.) family of Pointe-à-Pitre. The Isaacs were educated and wealthy, and were among a small number of people of mixed race who had managed to join the political and economic elite of the island. Socially, Guadeloupe was still mostly segregated. Alexandre Isaac studied law and became an advocate. He was appointed a sub-inspector of registration, and was Director of the Interior of Guadeloupe from 1879 and 1884.

Members of the African community in Guadeloupe had mostly been transported to the island as indentured servants in the 1860s and 1870s. In the 1880s they still lacked basic rights and civil liberties. When they petitioned for citizenship in 1884 Isaac, as Director of the Interior, was strongly in favour of granting their request. He said, "these foreigners ... have blended into the local population whose habits they have adopted, and today they continue with their hardworking tendencies, they are a population quite worthy of [our] concern." The island's general council passed a motion in favour of their naturalization by a large majority.

== Senator: first term (1885–94) ==
On 1 March 1885 Isaac was unanimously elected Senator of Guadeloupe. His brother, Auguste Isaac^{(fr)}, became a deputy of Guadeloupe in 1893. According to the black socialist politician Hégésippe Légitimus the Isaac brothers had betrayed the people of the island for the sake of their political ambitions. They had sold out to the white elites and catered to every whim of the sugar producers.

From 1885 Isaac was an advocate at the Paris bar. In the Senate he sat with the left, voted with the majority and participated in debates on topics such as primary education, sugar, the insane, the proposals by Anselme Batbie^{(fr)} concerning nationality, relationships between France and the Dominican Republic, organization of Indochina, colonial reform and the naval budget. He voted for establishment of the district ballot, for the Lisbonne law restricting freedom of the press and for the Senate process against General Boulanger. He was a member of the committees on war, the navy and customs, and was also a member of special committees to study legal and colonial texts. He was elected Secretary of the Senate in 1892, 1893 and 1894.

Isaac called for the West Indian colonies to be assimilated legally and administratively as French departments. In 1885 he presented to the senate the case for Guadloupe's African community to be given citizenship. Isaac was a key speaker at the Congrès Colonial International de Paris of 1889. The explorer Gustave Le Bon argued that attempts to educate the "inferior races" of the colonies would only cause them misery. Isaac opposed this view, reminded the audience of the ideals of the French Revolution and said he could not understand how education could be held to be a bad thing.

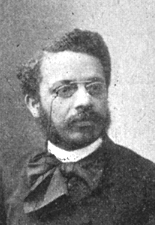
Alexandre Isaac senate portrait

In 1890 Isaac was deeply involved in the discussion of the bill to extend the 1888 bill concerning the Algerian indigenous people. He was a member of a senate committee led by Jules Ferry to overhaul the Algerian organization in 1891, and was one of seven committee members who visited Algeria. In 1893 he submitted a proposed law to change the system of representation of Algerian natives. In this proposal Isaac downplayed the issue of polygamy, and stated, "it would not be impossible, after setting aside religious prescriptions, strictly maintained in the field of personal status, to release, as has been done in other respects, local legislation which would, in relation to the metropolitan legislation, only show differences of detail justified by the diversity of needs." He noted that Algerian indigenous people were already subject to most aspects of French law, and the settlers also benefited from legal exemptions.

== Senator: second term (1894–99) ==
Isaac was reelected on 4 February 1894 by 194 out of 286 votes. In his election manifesto he clearly distanced himself from the revolutionary socialists. He continued to sit with the radical left. He was interested in all legal issues, but his main activity was in colonial issues, particularly those of Guadeloupe, the West Indies in general, and Algeria, and always in favour of humane and just administration. He was involved in discussions on colonial administration in general, the boundaries between the French Congo and German Kamerun, formation of a colonial army, judicial organization of the colonies, creation of a Ministry of the Colonies, Annam and Tonkin, annexation of the islands to the leeward of Tahiti and a colonial health service.

Isaac visited Senegal in 1894 when François Devès was accused of libel, and Isaac and Hyacinthe Devès also visited French Sudan. Isaac observed that local slavery was still in practice being condoned by the authorities. He wrote to Senegal Governor Henri-Félix de Lamothe^{(fr)} about his concerns over arbitrariness, the protectorate system and the judicial system. The governor was sure that Isaac was behind the attacks that two French newspapers made on his administration.

Isaac was involved in review of various reports on Algeria issued between 1892 and 1896, and submitted his own report on French and Muslim justice, police and security on 28 February 1895. He issued a report on 15 March 1898 in which he asked the Algerian committee to end the system of attachment that Albert Grévy had started in 1881, and that had been expanded by Louis Tirman between then and 1891. Isaac was one of the first members of the Central Committee of Ligue Des Droits De L'Homme, formed in 1898. He was one of the moderate republicans in the early League, others being the first president, Senator Ludovic Trarieux, and Yves Guyot. At an early meeting he pointed out that although the Dreyfus affair was absorbing, there were many other examples of injustice that demanded action, such as the plight of the Algerian Jews.

Alexandre Isaac died in office on 5 August 1899 in Vanves, Seine, at the age of 54.

== Publications ==
- Pierre Alexandre Ildefonse Isaac (1886), "La Guadeloupe et ses dépendances", La France coloniale
- Pierre Alexandre Ildefonse Isaac (1887), Questions coloniales: constitution et Senatus-Consultes, Guillaumin, p. 206
- Vincent Allègre; Alexandre Isaac (15 July 1890), France. Sénat (ed.), Proposition de loi, ayant pour objet de régler l'organisation des colonies de la Guadeloupe et de la Martinique, P. Mouillot, p. 31
- Alexandre Isaac (4 April 1893), France. Sénat (ed.), Proposition de loi relative à l'institution d'une Commission permanente pour l'examen des questions disciplinaires concernant les magistrats des colonies, P. Mouillot, p. 5
- Alexandre Isaac (1894), "L'Orientation de la politique coloniale et le ministere des colonies", Revue politique et parlementaire
- Pierre Alexandre Ildephonse Isaac (1895), France. Sénat (ed.), (Justice française et musulmane) Police et Sécurité (Session 1895), P. Mouillot, p. 423

== Sources ==
- Heath, Elizabeth (2014-10-09), Wine, Sugar, and the Making of Modern France: Global Economic Crisis and the Racialization of French Citizenship, 1870–1910, Cambridge University Press, ISBN 978-1-107-07058-5
- Irvine, William (2006-12-08), Between Justice And Politics: The Ligue Des Droits De L'Homme, 1898-1945, Stanford University Press, ISBN 978-0-8047-6787-3
- ISAAC Pierre (in French), Sénat de France
- Jolly, Jean, ed. (1960), "ISAAC (PIERRE, Alexandre, Ildefonse)", Dictionnaire des parlementaires français de 1889 à 1940, Presses universitaires de France
- Jolly, Jean, ed. (1960b), "ISAAC (AUGUSTE)", Dictionnaire des parlementaires français de 1889 à 1940, Presses universitaires de France
- Klein, Martin A. (1998-07-28), Slavery and Colonial Rule in French West Africa, Cambridge University Press, ISBN 978-0-521-59678-7
- Mariniello, Silvestra; Bové, Paul A. (1998), Gendered Agents: Women & Institutional Knowledge, Duke University Press, ISBN 0-8223-2196-3
- Robert, Adolphe; Cougny, Gaston (1889–1891), "ISAAC (PIERRE-ALEXANDRE-ILDEFONSE)", in Edgar Bourloton (ed.), Dictionnaire des parlementaires français (1789–1889) (in French)
- Surkis, Judith (2010), "Propriété, polygamie et statut personnel en Algérie coloniale, 1830-1873", Revue d'histoire du XIXe siècle (in French), 41 (41): 27–48, doi:10.4000/rh19.4041
