= Marie-Luce Penchard =

French politician (born 1959)

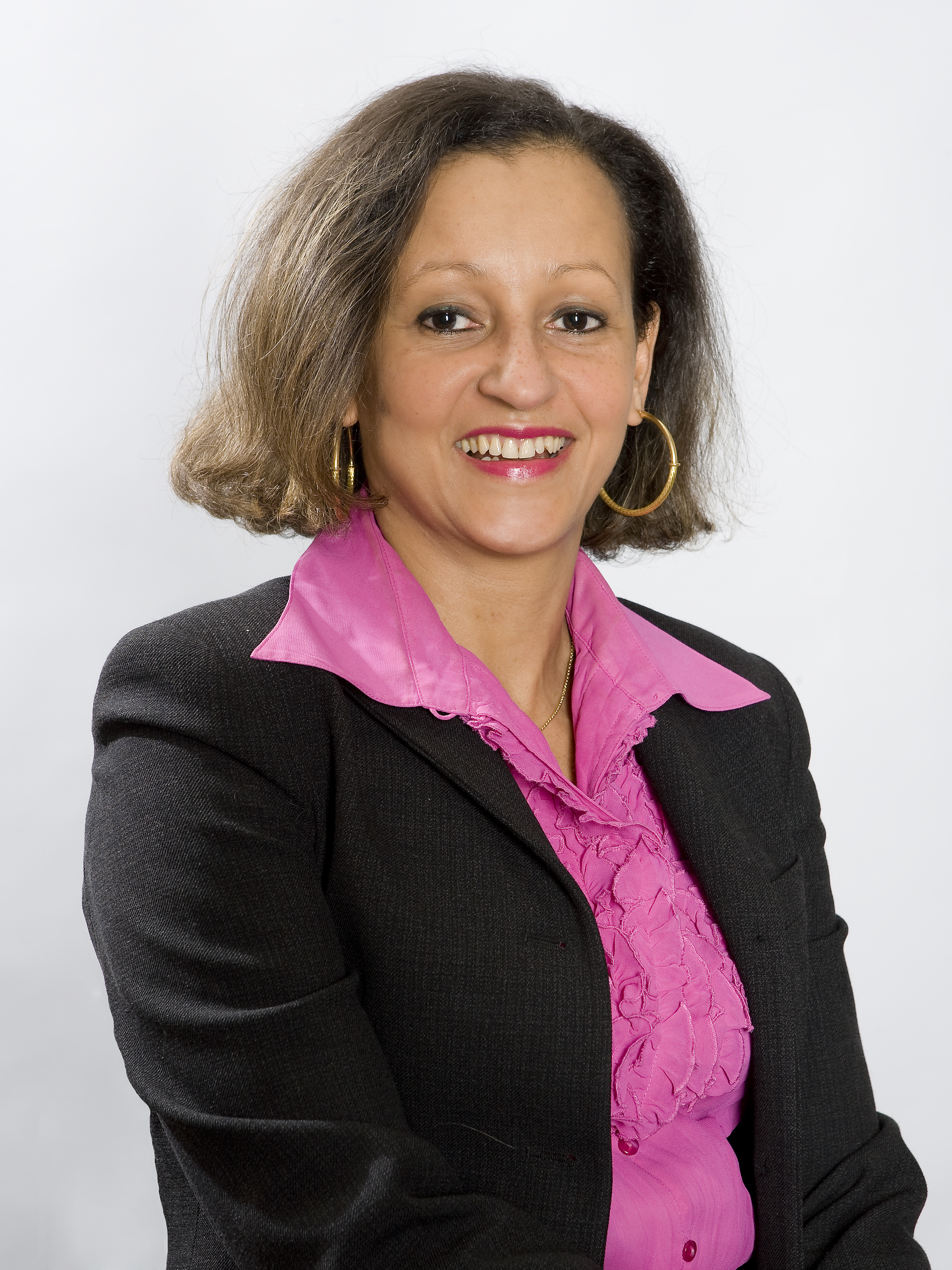
Marie-Luce Penchard

Marie-Luce Penchard (French pronunciation: [maʁi lys pɑ̃ʃaʁ]; born 14 February 1959, in Gourbeyre) is a French politician from Guadeloupe and member of the UMP. She is the daughter of Lucette Michaux-Chevry, the historical leader of the right in Guadeloupe and the former President of the Regional Council of Guadeloupe from 1992 until 2004.

In 2009, the UMP selected her to lead their list in the DOM-TOM constituency ahead of the 2009 European elections. Despite her list being entitled to one seat, she was not elected due to a provision in the electoral law which splits the constituency into three sub-constituencies. As a result, she was not entitled to a seat in the Atlantic subsection, but Maurice Ponga won the seat in the Pacific subsection.

She was named Secretary of State for Overseas Territories in the François Fillon government on 23 June 2009, becoming a minister in November that year. The nomination of a Guadeloupe native to this position is important since Guadeloupe was the epicentre of the 2009 French Caribbean general strikes.

She is mayor of Basse-Terre, the prefecture of Guadeloupe, since May 2014.

== Political career ==
Governmental functions

Secretary of State for Overseas : June–November 2009.

Minister in charge of Overseas : 2009–2012.

Electoral mandate

Regional Council

Regional councillor of Guadeloupe : Since 2010.
