= Regional Council of Guadeloupe =

The Regional Council of Guadeloupe consists of 41 members.

== President ==
Presidents of the Regional Council of Guadeloupe:

Name	Entered office	Left office	Party
Pierre Mathieu	May 12, 1974	August 12, 1980	PS
Robert Pentier	August 12, 1980	July 16, 1981	PS
Marcel Esdras	July 16, 1981	October 10, 1982	UDF
Marcel Gargar	October 10, 1982	June 23, 1983	PCF
José Moustache	June 23, 1983	April 16, 1986	RPR
Félix Proto	April 16, 1986	January 26, 1992	PS
Lucette Michaux-Chevry	January 26, 1992	August 15, 2004	RPR, from 2002: UMP
Victorin Lurel	August 15, 2004	August 21, 2012	PS
Josette Borel-Lincertin	August 21, 2012	October 11, 2014	PS
Victorin Lurel	October 11, 2014	November 28, 2015	PS
Ary Chalus	November 28, 2015	incumbent	GUSR-LREM

== Sources ==
- worldstatesmen.org
