= Henri Bangou =

Guadeloupean politician (1922–2023)

Mayor of Pointe-à-Pitre
- In office 1965–2008
- Succeeded by: Jacques Bangou

Senator of Guadeloupe
- In office 1986–1995

Personal details
- Born: July 15, 1922 Pointe-à-Pitre, Guadeloupe, France
- Died: November 21, 2023 (aged 101)
- Party: French Communist Party (until 1958); Guadeloupe Communist Party (1958–1991); Progressive Democratic Party of Guadeloupe (1991–2023)
- Spouse: Marcelle Bangou (died 2015)
- Children: Jacques Bangou
- Occupation: Politician, physician

Henri Bangou (15 July 1922 – 21 November 2023) was a politician from Guadeloupe, mayor of Pointe-à-Pitre from 1965 to 2008 and Senator of Guadeloupe from 1986 to 1995.

== Life and career ==
Born in Pointe-à-Pitre, Guadeloupe, Bangou became a member of the French Communist Party (PCF) while a medicine student in metropolitan France. He was then a member of the Guadeloupe Communist Party (PCG) when it was established at the beginning of the French Fifth Republic in 1958, and remained a member until 1991, after the fall of communism, when he led the Pointe-à-Pitre section to split and form the social-democratic Progressive Democratic Party of Guadeloupe (PPDG), of which he was the first president.

Bangou held the following political offices:

- First deputy mayor of Pointe-à-Pitre from 1959 to 1965
- Mayor of Pointe-à-Pitre from 1965 to 2008. He was succeeded by his son Jacques Bangou, who remained mayor until 2019.
- General councillor of Guadeloupe from 1967 to 1989
- Regional councillor of Guadeloupe from 1975 to 1986
- Senator of Guadeloupe from 1986 to 1995.

His wife Marcelle (born 1924) died in June 2015, at the age of 91.

Bangou turned 100 on 15 July 2022, and died on 21 November 2023, at the age of 101.

== Sources ==
- Page on the French Senate website
