= Marie Bérenger =

French war resistor (1865–1944)

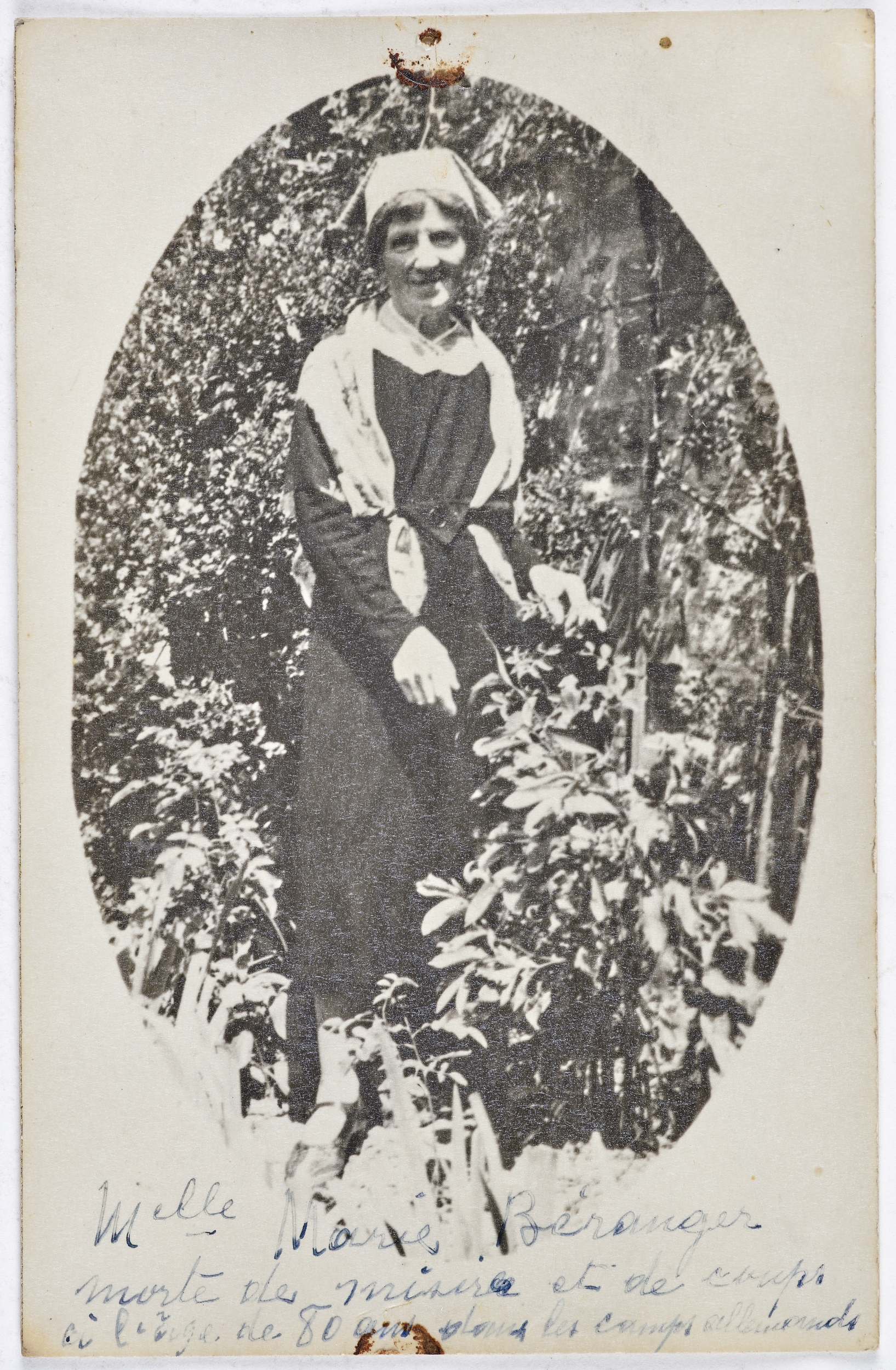
- Bérenger in 1942
- Born: 2 December 1865; La Chapelle-Boby (Rennes), France
- Died: 4 November 1944 (aged 78); Ravensbrück concentration camp, Germany
- Occupation: War resister
- Years active: 1940-1944
- Known for: Resistance activities against Nazis in France

Marie Bérenger (2 December 1865 – 4 November 1944) was a French Resistance activist who fought against the German occupation of France during World War II. Deported to the Ravensbrück women's concentration camp, she died there at 78 before the end of the war. Her home in Paramé was used as a meeting place for the resistance, a refuge for fighters, and a depot for weapons and propaganda.

== Biography ==
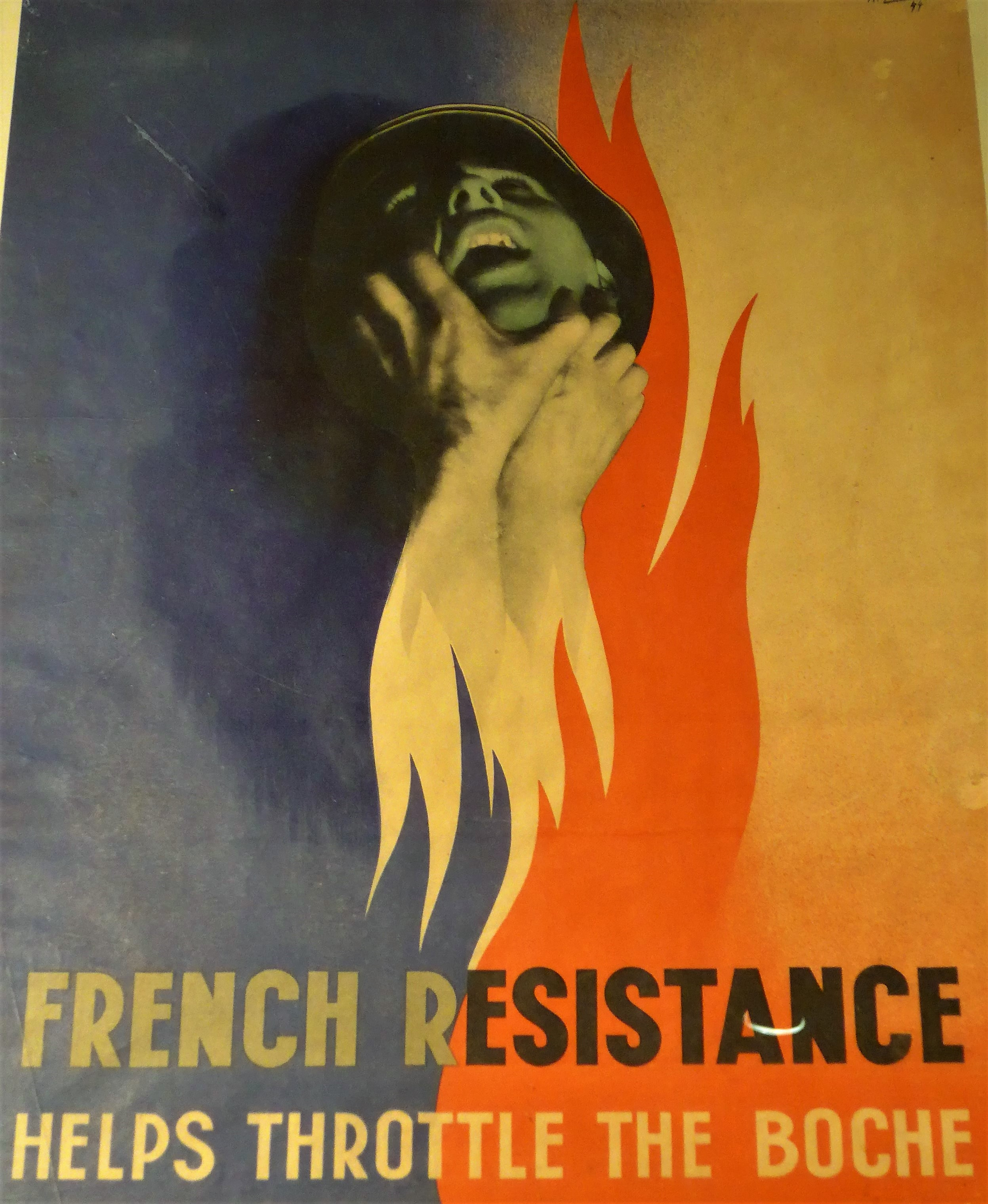
Poster encouraging the French Resistance

She was born on 2 December 1865, in La Chapelle-Boby (Rennes, Ille-et-Vilaine, France), the daughter of Marie Dos and Charles Victor Béranger. From a young age, Marie was a pacifist and communist sympathizer. Her brother, Henry Bérenger, born in 1867, served as a senator for Guadeloupe from 1912 to 1945.

=== Endurance ===
In October 1940, at the age of 75, she joined a resistance group of twelve people from Paramé, a neighborhood in Saint-Malo in Brittany in northwest France. The strategic importance of this geographical area led to the formation of several resistance networks that provided information to British intelligence. In October 1940, she became an active war resister as part of Isidore Leroux group.

Between 1941 and 1944, her home on Avenue de Lorraine in Paramé was used as a meeting place, a refuge for fighters, a depot for weapons and ammunition and a storehouse of anti-German propaganda leaflets. From that convenient location, the resistance group gathered information on port movements and mining plans in the Bay of Saint-Malo.

Béranger was arrested by the Gestapo for the first time on 25 September 1942, and taken to a detention camp in Rennes, France, accused of disturbing the peace. She remained there for three months, after which she was released due to lack of evidence and her advanced age of 77 years. Upon returning home, she resumed her secret activities.

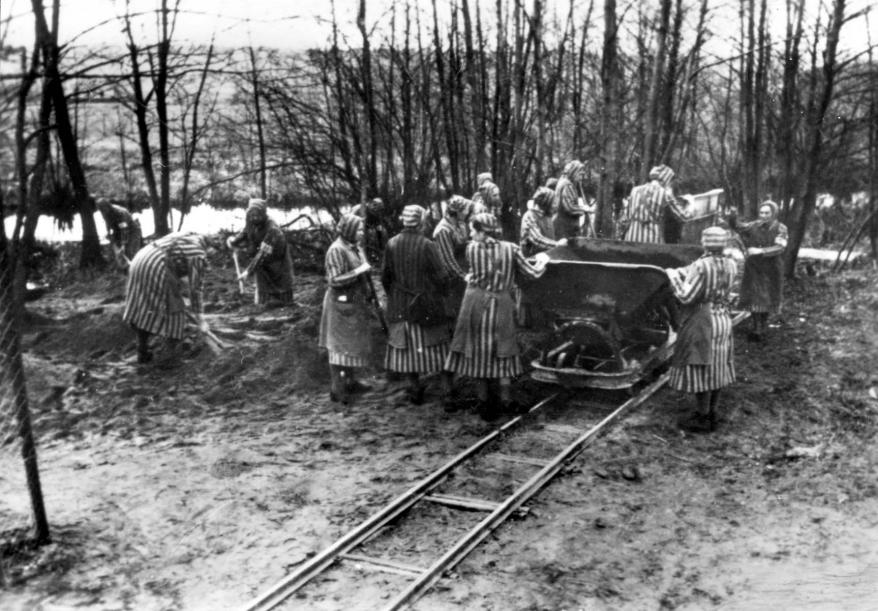
Women performing forced labor at the Ravensbrück camp (1939)

In September 1943, she was arrested for the second time and imprisoned in the Jacques Cartier prison in Rennes, where she was subjected to numerous interrogations. She remained there until August 1944.

=== Deportation ===
During the summer of 1944, as the Allied armies advanced, the German authorities decided to organize evacuation transports for the people detained in internment camps. Convoys of men were separated from convoys of women and children. Five of these departed from Toulouse, Rennes, Bordeaux, Lyon, and Belfort between 30 July 30 and 1 September 1944. The men were sent to the Buchenwald or Dachau concentration camps, and the women and children were sent to the Ravensbrück concentration camp.

As part of that transport plan, during the night of 2 August 1944, Béranger was put on the so-called Langeais Train bound for Belfort and then on to the Struthof-Natzweiler concentration camp. She remained there until 1 September 1944, when she was deported to Ravensbrück with seventy other people from Saint-Malo and Saint-Servan, ranging in age from eight months to eighty years. Many deportees died in the Nazi camps, some shortly after arrival and others after much hardship. At Ravensbrück, Béranger was identified by the number 62803. While there, according to her sister, she endured "brutal beatings with a club, a four-day and four-night period without food and solitary confinement."

Marie Bérenger suffered for three months and died on 4 November 1944, just a month short of her seventy-ninth birthday.

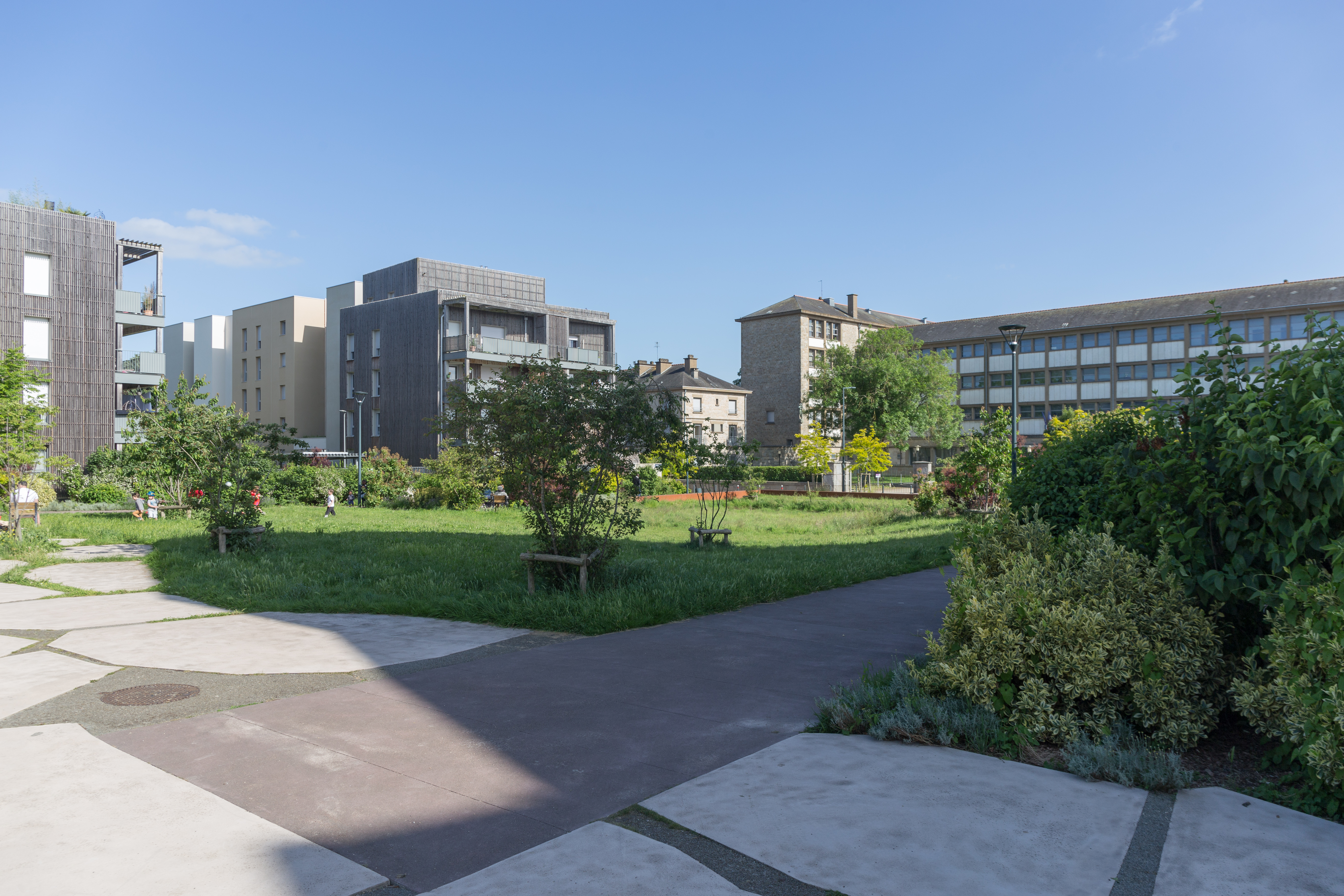
Marie Bérenger Square in Rennes

=== Distinctions ===
- In Rennes, facing the Notre-Dame des Grèves church, a square dedicated to Marie Bérenger.
- In Saint-Malo, a street is named after her.
- Her name is inscribed on the war memorial in Paramé.
