= René Toribio =

French politician (1912–1990)

René Toribo

Senator
- In office 26 April 1959 – 1 October 1968
- Constituency: Guadeloupe

Mayor of Lamentin
- In office 1989–1990
- Preceded by: Georges Dagonia (PS)
- Succeeded by: José Toribio (Note: his son)

Mayor of Lamentin
- In office 1945–1971
- Succeeded by: Georges Dagonia (SFIO, then PS)

conseiller général of Lamantin Canton
- In office 1947–1967
- Succeeded by: Georges Dagonia (FGDS, then PS)

Personal details
- Born: 10 December 1912 Lamentin, Guadeloupe
- Died: 27 July 1990 (aged 77)
- Party: SFIO (1945-1969), PS (1969-1972), PSG 1972-1990
- Profession: headmaster

René Toribio (born 10 December 1912 in Lamentin, Guadeloupe; died 27 July 1990 in the same town) was a French politician and was a member of the French Senate representing Guadeloupe from 1959 to 1968.

== Biography ==
Before WWII he was a teacher and a headmaster. Active in the French Resistance, he was elected as mayor of his home town Lamentin in 1945. Two years later, as Guadeloupe had become a French department in 1946, he was also elected as the first conseiller général of the Lamantin Canton. He became a member of the French Section of the Workers' International in 1949 and rapidly emerged as one of its local leaders. He was elected its federal secretary for Guadeloupe until 1958.

He then presided in 1953-1956 the General Council of Guadeloupe. One year after an unsuccessful candidacy at the 1958 legislative election, he was elected in 1959 as a senator, thus holding three mandates simultaneously.

In five years time he lost his mandates of conseiller général (1967), of senator (1968), of mayor (1971), then quit his party in 1972 to form the Guadeloupean Socialist Party, a splinter of the French Socialist Party in reaction against the Programme commun signed by the PS with the French Communist Party. (Note: Other former SFIO office holders acted similarly in Metropolitan France at the same time, and founded in 1973 the Social Democratic Party (PSD)) Under this new political label, he took part to the 1973 legislative election, but failed to be elected. He supported in 1974 the presidential candidacy of François Mitterrand, but never again joined the PS.

In 1989, he succeeded to regain his mayorship in Lamentin, but deceased the next year and was succeeded by his son José Toribio, who also became the new PSG's president.
