= Henry Bérenger =

French politician and diplomat (1867–1952)

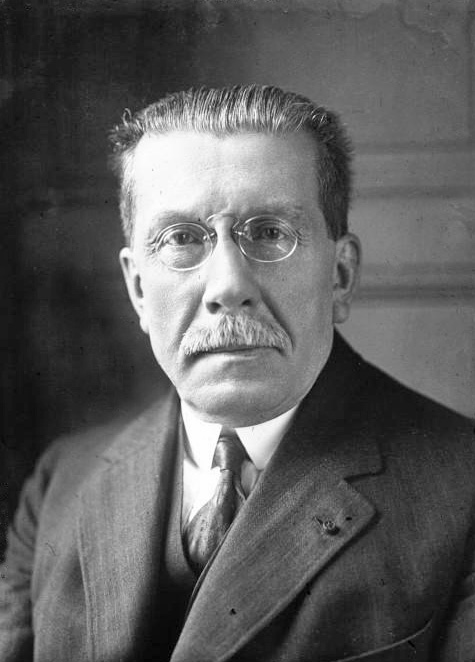
- Bérenger in 1925

Senator of Guadeloupe
- In office 7 January 1912 – 21 October 1945
- Preceded by: Adolphe Cicéron
- Succeeded by: Eugénie Éboué-Tell

Personal details
- Born: 22 April 1867 Rugles, France
- Died: 18 May 1952 (aged 85) Saint-Raphaël, Var, France
- Occupation: Politician and diplomat

Henry Bérenger (22 April 1867 – 18 May 1952) was a French writer and politician who was an influential Senator from 1912 until 1945, sitting on committees on Finance and Foreign Affairs. He was France's ambassador to the United States from 1926 to 1927.

== Early years ==
Henry Bérenger was born on 22 April 1867 in Rugles, Eure. His sister was the French war resister, Marie Bérenger. Henry was educated at the college at Dinan, the Lycee of Coutances, the Lycée Henri-IV in Paris and the Sorbonne, where he obtained a B.A. He won an open competition in philosophy.

In 1891, Bérenger published a noted study of Lavisse. In the 1890s he published poems inspired by Gabriele D'Annunzio in the journals l'Ermitage and La Conque. He was leader of a group called "Art and Life" that discussed subjects like symbolism, free thought, spirituality and socialism. He published several books, wrote in La Dépêche de Toulouse, and in 1903 founded the journal L'Action. He soon left L'Action and became in turn director of Le Siècle (1908) and Paris-Midi (1911).

== Political career ==
Henry Bérenger won election to the Senate for Guadeloupe on 7 January 1912, and held this seat until 1945. He was a Radical Socialist, and joined the Democratic Left. He joined the Commission for Algeria. World War I began in July 1914. In August 1914 Bérenger proposed a law to regulate the press in wartime. He was a member of the commission for economic organization of the country, and in 1917 submitted a bill for a law for civil mobilization and the organization of labor. He was appointed Commissioner General for Gasoline and Combustibles on 21 August 1918 in the government of Georges Clemenceau. He retained this position in the government of Alexandre Millerand, until resigning on 23 September 1920. His policies ensured that France received 22.5% of the oil of Mosul, and influenced development of the French refining industry.

In 1921 Bérenger was a member of the Finance Committee and the main mover for the law on control of expenses. He was elected rapporteur général, holding this position until 1926 and increasing the influence of the committee in managing finance. He was appointed to the Foreign Affairs Committee in 1924. In August 1925 he was a parliamentary delegate on the Caillaux mission that went to Washington, D.C., to address the issue of debt between the Allies. In 1926 Aristide Briand appointed Bérenger Ambassador to the United States. His negotiations there led to the Mellon-Berenger Agreement for settling war debts. His collected speeches and articles on this subject were published in 1933. He continued to be involved in Belles Lettres, publishing articles in the Revue des deux Mondes and the Revue de Paris and directing the periodical Actualités.

Bérenger returned to France in 1928, and was charged by the Finance Committee with a report on the Foreign Affairs budget. As Vice-president of the Committee on Foreign Affairs, on 12 November 1931 he and Joseph Caillaux questioned the government on the relationship between France and the Soviet Union. Soon after he became President of the Foreign Affairs Committee, holding this position until 1939. On 21 September 1932 he was also appointed nominal delegate of France to the League of Nations. Although hostile to fascism, he advocated a neutral position in the Spanish Civil War. He became increasingly outspoken against the regimes of Hitler and Mussolini.

Under the first government of Léon Blum (in office 4 June 1936 – 22 June 1937) Théodore Steeg was appointed head of a commission to study socio-economic conditions in the French colonial empire. The North African sub-committee included other leading figures such as Paul Reynaud, Charles-André Julien and Paul Rivet. Meeting on 8 July 1937, this sub-committee decided to focus on labor conditions in the Maghreb. (Note: The Maghreb is the region of North Africa that includes Morocco, Algeria and Tunisia.) They were too late to prevent the escalation of widespread and violent labor unrest in the region, which was violently suppressed.

Bérenger represented France as the principal delegate at the Évian Conference in July 1938, organized to solve the problem of Jewish refugees from Germany. After the Munich Agreement he intervened with Georges Bonnet, Minister for Foreign Affairs, with the hope of now obtaining a resolution of the Jewish issue, but Hitler remained adamant. In June 1940, he abstained from voting over the delegation of powers to Marshal Philippe Pétain. He retired to Saint-Raphaël, Var, where he died on 18 May 1952. He was an Officer of the Legion of Honor.

== Selected work ==
Works included:

- Bérenger, Henry (1892). L'ame moderne.
- Bérenger, Henry (1892). L'effort. A. Colin.
- Bérenger, Henry (1895). L'aristocratie intellectuelle. A. Colin. (Winner of an award by the Académie française)
- Bérenger, Henry (1897). La proie (The Prey). (Novel)
- Bérenger, Henry (1899). La France intellectuelle. A. Colin et cie.
- Bérenger, Henry; Pottier, Paul; Marcel, Pierre; P. Gabillard; Marius-Ary Leblond (1901). Les Prolétaires intellectuels en France. éditions de la Revue.
- Bérenger, Henry (1902). L'Héritage de Victor Hugo et la Renaissance française.
- Bérenger, Henry (1898). La Conscience nationale.
- Bérenger, Henry (1910). De Combes à Briand. Maison des publications littéraires et politiques.
- Bérenger, Henry (1911). Les résurrections italiennes: Décorées de treize compositions de Eugène Grasset. E. Pelletan.
- Lafferre, L.; Bérenger, Henry (1912). Un projet transactionnel de réforme électorale... Préface de Henry Bérenger. Editions de la Ligue d'union républicaine pour la réforme électorale.
- Bérenger, Henry; Baudin, Pierre (1912). Réforme électorale et République. Ed. de la ligue d'union républicaine pour la réforme électorale.
- Bérenger, Henry (1919). La politique du pétrole.
- Bérenger, Henry (1920). Le Pétrole et la France, par Henry Bérenger. E. Flammarion.
- Bérenger, Henry (1926). Paroles d'Amérique. (Réponse du président des Etats-Unis d'Amérique, Calvin Coolidge, au discours de Henry Bérenger, le 20 janvier 1926). impr. F. Paillart.
- Bérenger, Henry (1930). Chateaubriand. Hachette.
- Bérenger, Henry (1933). La Question des dettes. Hachette.
- Bérenger, Henry (1941). Balsamaires. F. Robaudy.
- Bérenger, Henry (1949). Des relativités aux métamorphoses. Poésies philosophiques, 1886–1949. Éd. de l'Académie méditerranéenne.
