= Mellon–Berenger Agreement =

1926 agreement between the United States and France

Mellon-Berenger Agreement
- Signed: 29 April 1926
- Location: Washington, D.C., Paris
- Effective: 18 December 1929
- Negotiators: Andrew W. Mellon; Henry Bérenger
- Parties: United States; France
- Languages: French; English

The Mellon-Berenger Agreement (or Accord Mellon-Bérenger) (29 April 1926) was an agreement on the amount and rate of repayment of France's debt to the United States arising from loans and payments in kind made during World War I (1914–1918), both before and after the armistice with Germany. The agreement greatly reduced the amount owing by France, with relatively easy payment terms. However, it was deeply unpopular in France, whose people felt that the United States should waive the debt in light of the huge losses of life and material damage that France had suffered, or at least link payments to reparations from Germany. Ratification by the French parliament was delayed until July 1929. The Great Depression began soon after. In the end, little of the debt was repaid.

== Initial agreement ==
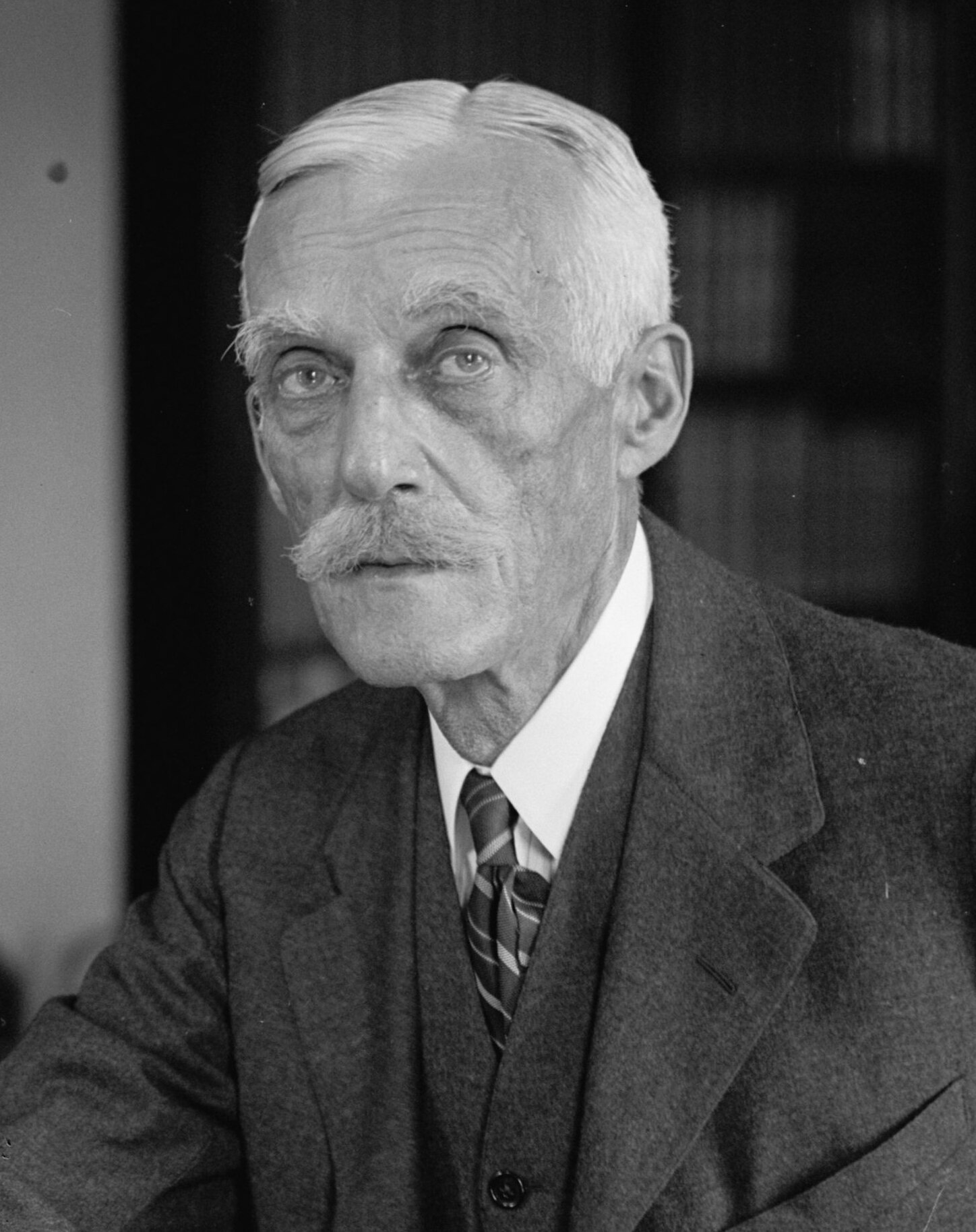
Andrew W. Mellon, US Secretary of the Treasury

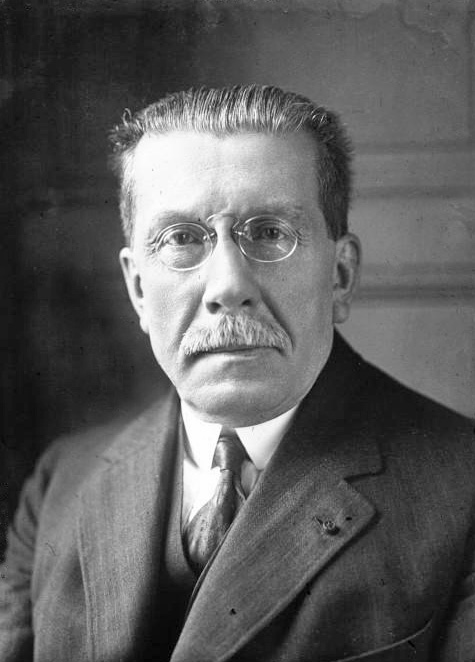
Henry Bérenger, French ambassador to the United States

The Dawes Plan of 1924 defined a realistic schedule for German reparations to the victorious Allies in World War I. By establishing confidence, it made it possible for Germany to borrow from the United States at reasonable rates and to use the money to pay Britain and France. They, in turn, used the reparations to repay their debt to the United States in what John Maynard Keynes described as a great "circular flow of money".

The United States began quietly preventing private or public loans to France as long as the question of debt repayment remained unsettled, creating pressure on the franc. Financiers and government experts on finance in France came to accept that a clear agreement was needed.

In the agreement with Britain, payments were linked to payments of reparations to France by Germany. The French wanted a similar clause linking the payments to the United States to reparations, but the United States would not accept the linkage. The agreement was the most favorable that could be negotiated. French Ambassador Henry Bérenger signed the agreement, subject to ratification by the French Parliament.

The American Debt Commission said that it "believes that this settlement represents substantially France's capacity to pay."

President Coolidge, in his message to Congress, said, "I believe that the settlement... is fair and just to both Governments and recommend its approval." The reaction was less positive in France, where 20,000 war veterans demonstrated in Paris against the agreement. The British were also critical. Most French people felt the United States should waive its claims to war debts, and successive governments delayed ratification. Related issues were Prohibition in the United States, which had hurt French exports, and punitive tariffs on other French goods, which had created a serious imbalance of trade between both countries.

== Negotiations ==
In mid-1928, President Calvin Coolidge was pressing France to ratify the agreement. At the same time, there was rising nationalist pressure in Germany to negotiate changes to the Dawes Plan and to obtain evacuation of French troops occupying the Rhineland. On 16 September 1928, Aristide Briand of France and Gustav Stresemann of Germany agreed to link negotiations on reparation payments and withdrawal of troops. A committee met in Paris on 9 February 1929 to pin down the German payment amounts and schedule. Owen D. Young, an American banker, chaired the group. Under pressure from the Americans, a revised settlement was defined in which the German debts were reduced, and the terms of payment were made easier.

The French prime minister, Raymond Poincaré, hoped to be able to fight the Young Plan at the planned conference at the Hague in August 1929. His position would be much stronger if the Mellon-Berenger Agreement was ratified, and he threw all his effort into getting the bill passed by parliament.

Another motive for ratification was that the French debt to the United States of $400 million for munitions acquired after the armistice was due for payment on 1 August 1929. Although France could pay by withdrawing gold deposits from London, such a massive transfer would be disruptive.

Poincaré appears to have used secret funds to bribe the press to support the agreement. All of the major newspapers, which had until then opposed ratification, swung round to give their support by mid-July. Poincaré, who was in poor health, gave the case for ratification to the Chamber of Deputies on 16 July 1926. The next day, he was confined to bed on doctor's orders to could recover his strength for a prostate operation.

== Ratification ==
The French Chamber of Deputies narrowly ratified the 1926 agreement on 21 July 1929 after an all-night session, voting 300 to 292 in favor. The chamber than ratified the Caillaux-Churchill agreement on French war debts to Great Britain. Poincaré was unable to attend the debate because of his health problems. The French Senate concurred on 26 July 1929.

In a statement on 28 July 1929, Hoover outlined the terms of the agreement. France would make payments of $35 million in the 1930 fiscal year, with the amount payable rising over the next eleven years to a maximum of $125 million annually. The value of the payments was then $1,680 million.

The payments would be taken as eliminating the total debt, which was about $4,230 million on 15 June 1925. The United States had refused to accept any connection between the payments and France's receipt of reparation payments.

The House of Representatives approved the agreement on 12 December 1929, and the Senate passed it on 16 December 1929. Hoover signed the agreement on 18 December 1929.

By 1931, France was starting to feel the impact of the Great Depression. By 1932, the French were in serious financial difficulties and were forced to consider missing the payment due on 15 December 1932. In the end, most of the debt was never repaid.
