= Lucien Bernier =

Guadeloupean politician

General Councillor of Pointe-à-Pitre
- Incumbent
- Assumed office 1945

Mayor of Saint-François, Guadeloupe
- Incumbent
- Assumed office 1947

General Councillor of Saint-François
- Incumbent
- Assumed office 1949

Senator of France for Guadeloupe
- Incumbent
- Assumed office 1958

Personal details
- Born: May 27, 1914 Guadeloupe, France
- Died: April 5, 1989 (aged 74)
- Party: Radical Party (France); French Section of the Workers' International
- Occupation: Politician, lawyer

Lucien Bernier (May 27, 1914, in Guadeloupe – April 5, 1989) was a politician from Guadeloupe who was elected to the French Senate in 1958.

== Biography ==
After studying law in mainland France, Lucien Bernier settled as a lawyer in Guadeloupe. He was initially a member of the Radical Party (France) before joining the French Section of the Workers' International. On October 7, 1945, he was elected General Councillor of Pointe-à-Pitre.In 1947, he was elected mayor of Saint-François, Guadeloupe, and in 1949, he was elected General Councillor for the same town. As a General Councillor, he was a member of the Socialist group, and in October 1953 was elected Conseiller de French Union by his General Council colleagues.

In the 1958 senatorial elections, he was elected by one vote to the incumbent,Maurice Satineau, on a “Gauche guadeloupéenne” list. In the upper house, he was a member of the Socialist group in the Senate.

== Bibliography ==
- page on the French Senate website
