= Marcel Esdras =

Guadeloupean politician

Marcel Esdras (21 May 1927 in Pointe-Noire, Guadeloupe – 13 November 1988 in Clichy-la-Garenne, France) was a politician from Guadeloupe who served in the French National Assembly from 1981–1986 representing Union pour la démocratie française. He also served as the President of the Regional Council of Guadeloupe from 1981 until 1982.

== Bibliography ==
- Marcel Esdras page on the French National Assembly website
