= François Louisy =

Guadeloupean politician

François Louisy (12 December 1921 in Guadeloupe – 17 September 2007) was a politician from Guadeloupe who was elected to the French Senate in 1986.
