= Charles-André de La Jaille =

French general (1824–1892)

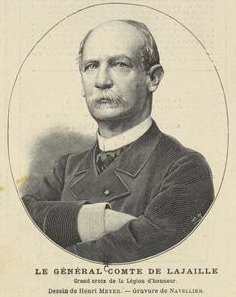

Senator of Guadeloupe
- In office 27 February 1876 – 24 January 1885
- Succeeded by: Alexandre Isaac

Personal details
- Born: 15 April 1824 Baie-Mahault, Guadeloupe, France
- Died: 5 August 1892 (aged 68) Paris, France
- Occupation: Soldier, politician

Viscount Charles-André de La Jaille (15 April 1824 – 5 August 1892) was a French general who campaigned in the Crimea, Italy and Mexico, fought in the Franco-Prussian War of 1870 and helped suppress the Paris Commune the next year. He was monarchist Senator of Guadeloupe from 1876 to 1885.

== Early years (1824–45) ==
Charles-André de La Jaille was born in Baie-Mahault, Guadeloupe, on 15 April 1824. His father was Charles-André de La Jaille (1796–1882), son of the marquis François Charles de La Jaille (1774–1801) and a cavalry lieutenant in the king's bodyguard of the company of the Duke of Wagram. His mother was Caroline François Camille du Bois de La Saussaye d'Estrelan (c. 1802–1851). He was the second child and second boy in a large family. He entered the École Polytechnique in 1843 and became a 2nd lieutenant of artillery in 1845.

== Military career (1845–75) ==
La Jaille was promoted to lieutenant in 1847 and captain in 1852. He was stationed in Toulouse at the start of the Crimean War (1853–56). He went to the Crimea as orderly officer of General de Lourmel^{(fr)}, who was killed during the Battle of Inkerman on 7 November 1854. He brought Lourmel's body back to France to be buried at Pontivy, and was decorated with the Cross of the Legion of Honour. He was appointed to the artillery of the Guard under squadron commander Laumière, and returned at once to the Crimea. On 27 July 1855 a shell burst at his feet outside the Malakoff redoubt. It covered him with earth and pebbles and fractured his jaw, ending his campaign. On his return to France La Jaille was assigned to the Imperial Guard at the Tuileries Palace.

During the Franco-Austrian War La Jaille fought at the Battle of Magenta (4 June 1859) where his battery took the bridge over the Naviglio Grande from the Austrians. La Jaille placed his pieces to the right and left of the bridge of Boffalora sopra Ticino. His fire opened the bridge to the French infantry, who crossed it but were driven back by a regiment of Tyrolean chasseurs, who captured one of the guns. At the Battle of Solferino (24 June 1859) his placement of the guns enabled the Guards division to take the Mont des Cyprès height. The emperor saw the maneuver, verbally congratulated him and made him an officer of the Legion of Honour. La Jaille was promoted to squadron commander on 1 August 1860.

He fought with distinction during the French intervention in Mexico. He was chief of staff to General de Laumière, who was killed during the Siege of Puebla on 6 April 1863 . He was cited for his actions at the battle of San Lorenzo^{(fr)} (May 1863). On 13 August 1863 he was promoted to lieutenant colonel. As of April 1864 he was president of the Geology and Minerals section of the Commission Scientifique, Littéraire et Artistique de Mexico. He was noted for the skill of his artillery placement at the siege of Oaxaca, which surrendered on 9 February 1865. After his return to France on 6 June 1867 he was promoted to colonel.

During the Franco-Prussian War (1870) La Jaille commanded the reserve artillery of Marshal Edmond Le Bœuf's 3rd army corps. He served during the Siege of Metz, which capitulated on 27 October 1870, and was then held as a prisoner in Bonn. In 1871 he commanded the reserve artillery of the Versailles army during the suppression of the Paris Commune. He was promoted to brigadier general on 24 June 1871. He was stationed at Bourges and commanded the 5th infantry brigade of the 8th army corps. He was given three stars (divisional general) on 15 March 1877. He was appointed a member of the artillery committee in 1877 and was president of the artillery committee in 1882. He was appointed Grand Officer of the Legion of Honour in 1882. He had served for 41 years in 11 campaigns with one injury and three citations.

== Political career (1876–92) ==
During the senatorial elections of 1876 La Jaille was elected on 27 February 1876 as Senator of Guadeloupe on a monarchist platform by 29 votes against 27 to the Republican candidate. His election was validated despite serious challenges, since the municipal councils of Guadeloupe had not been reelected within the legal deadline. He sat with the extreme right. He was called "a stronger Royalist than the Comte de Chambord. (Note: Henri, Count of Chambord, was the Legitimist pretender to the throne of France from 1844 to 1883.) In the senate he approved the acts of Patrice de MacMahon in the 16 May 1877 crisis, and voted in June for the dissolution of the Chamber of Deputies. He then spoke against the policy of the Dufaure ministry, against reform of the judicial personnel, against reestablishment of the divorce, against credits for the Tonkin Campaign.

La Jaille did not stand for re-election on 25 January 1885 in the triennial renewal of the Senate. He died in Paris on 5 August 1892 without having married.

== Publications ==
Publications by La Jaille include:

- Général Vte de La Jaille; et al., Projet de résolution tendant à la nomination d'une Commission de dix-huit membres chargée d'étudier et de proposer les moyens de remédier aux maux de la sucrerie indigène et coloniale (Sénat, session 1876, n ° 134), Versaille: Impr. de A. Bourdilliat / France. Sénat, p. 2
- Général Loysel; Général d'Espeuilles; Général Vte de La Jaille, Proposition de loi ayant pour but : 1 ° de porter aux quatre cinquièmes des extinctions, parmi les personnes décorées de la médaille militaire, la proportion des nouvelles nominations fixées par la loi du 25 janvier 1875; 2 ° de porter aux trois quarts des extinctions, parmi les militaires et marins décorés de la Légion d'honneur, la proportion des nouvelles nominations fixées par la loi du 25 juillet 1873 (Sénat, session 1878, n ° 202), Versaille: Impr. de P. Mouillot/ France. Sénat, p. 6
- Général Vte de La Jaille; et al., Rapport fait au nom de la Commission chargée d'examiner le projet de loi, adopté par la Chambre des députés, portant approbation d'un traité conclu à Paris, le 10 août 1877, entre la France et la Suède, pour la rétrocession de l'île Saint-Barthélemy à la France (Sénat, session 1878, n ° 83), Versaille: Impr. de P. Mouillot / France. Sénat, p. 14
- Général Vte de La Jaille; et al., Rapport fait, au nom de la Commission chargée d'examiner le projet de loi, adopté par la Chambre des députés, relatif au déclassement du château de Caen, du fort Saint-Louis de Cette, de la place de Port-Louis et de divers ouvrages, et au classement des lignes de Loc-Malo (Sénat, session 1881, n ° 359), Paris: Impr. de P. Mouillot / France. Sénat, p. 6

== Sources ==
- Charles-André de La Jaille (1824-1892) (in French), BnF: Bibliotheque nationale de France
- "La famille de La Jaille, branche bretonne", infoBretagne.com (in French)
- Le Goff, Armelle; Prevost Urkidi, Nadia (2009), Exploration scientifique du Mexique – F/17/2009 à 2914/3 (PDF) (in French), Archives nationales
- Marquis de Brisay (1910), La Maison de La Jaille, Paris: H. Champion
- "Obituary. Gen. De Le Jaille" (PDF), New York Times, 27 August 1892
- Pierfit, "Charles-André de La JAILLE", Geneanet (in French)
- Robert, Adolphe; Cougny, Gaston (1889–1891), "LAJAILLE (CHARLES-ANDRÉ, VICOMTE DE)", in Edgar Bourloton (ed.), Dictionnaire des Parlementaires français (1789–1889) (in French)
