= Hégésippe Légitimus =

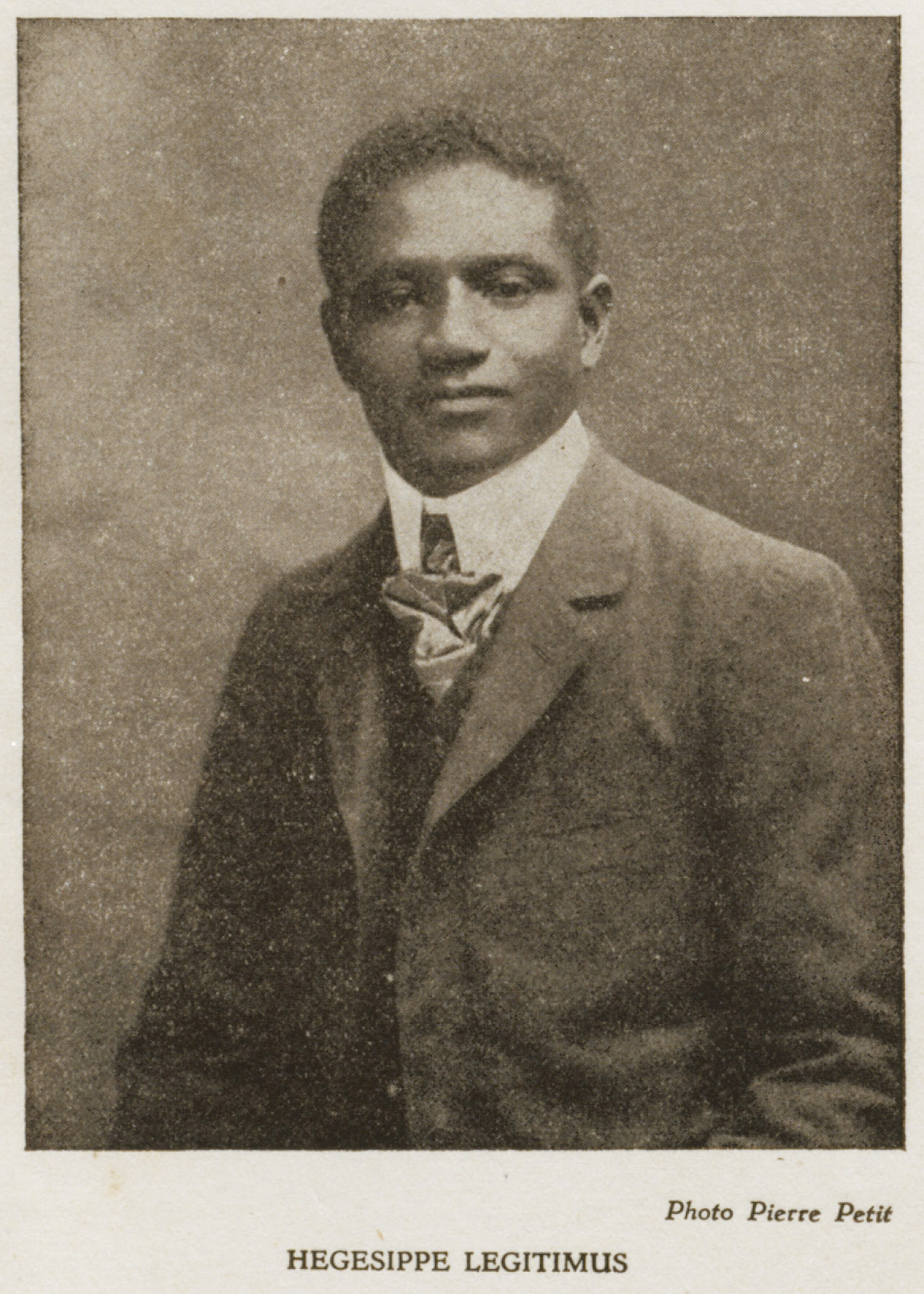

Hégésippe Jean Légitimus was born in Pointe-à-Pitre, Guadeloupe on 8 April 1868 and died before the end of World War II in Angles-sur-l'Anglin, France, on 29 November 1944. He was a socialist politician from Guadeloupe who served in the Chamber of Deputies from 1898–1902 and 1906-1914.

In 1793, Jean-Baptiste Belley was the first black man elected to the French Parliament. It would be 105 years later before another black man, Hégésippe Légitimus, was elected. Up until 1898 the colonies and territoires d'Outre-Mer had only been represented by white, mixed-race or "béké" deputies.

Légitimus was followed shortly afterwards by other black deputies: Gratien Candace, Blaise Diagne, Ngalandou Diouf, Achille René-Boisneuf and Maurice Satineau. He sat in the parliamentary assembly alongside Guesde, Jean Jaurès and Léon Blum, becoming good friends with them.

Légitimus was one of the founders of the Parti Ouvrier, the socialist party of Guadaloupe. It was politically aligned with that of mainland France.

Légitimus, councillor and mayor of Pointe-à-Pitre, founder of the socialist movement in Guadeloupe, Member of Parliament in Paris, made an indelible mark on French political life at the beginning of the nineteenth century.

The price of sugar went through the roof during the US Civil War (1861-1865). But it began to fall again in 1870, creating a crisis that had the effect of rationalising capital, wealth and production on one hand against the abolition of slave labour, unreliable production and social upheaval and war on the other hand. The crisis, and consequent world-wide disruption, continued until 1914, whereupon many families had migrated from Guadeloupe to live in mainland France.

Socialism rose up in the thoughts and actions of workers, including the black slaves and workers on the sugar plantations, and amongst the intelligentsia. In 1914, the war to end all world wars began. Socialist parties quickly grew in number, strength and influence throughout recognised world diaspora. Hégésippe Légitimus was the founder and driving force of the Socialist Party in Guadeloupe.

Légitimus also founded the Republican Youth Committee and the Workers Party of Guadeloupe. He established a newspaper called "The People" in 1891. The Workers Party was politically aligned to the socialist-left and quickly became popular amongst the Guadeloupeans. It became very popular because it was the first Party to defend workers' rights and give a united voice to the black population. Légitimus entered the House of Deputies as the member for Guadeloupe in 1898. He became President of the Council in 1899 and was elected Mayor of Pointe-à-Pitre in 1904.

The new order of politics, aligned with that of mainland France, exemplified by Legitimus's socialist credo, attacked the virtual monopoly held by mulattoes in Guadeloupean business and politics. Mulattoes were accused by many people of acting against the interests of the black population. But, Légitimus also earned his share of critics because he was accused of collaborating with "the big end of town" over bank start-up finances needed by small businesses and support capital needed by on-going, large projects. Economic necessities in the circumstances, as always, might have required a cautious, rather than radical, approach.

For a quarter of a century Légitimus was considered the voice of the black movement. Some called him the black Jaurès. Jean Jaurès was the famous French socialist, pacifist and intellectual assassinated by a young fascist war-monger in Montmartre at the beginning of WW1. Légitimus helped open the doors of tertiary education to everyone. He supported the political careers of Gaston Monnerville, the grandson of a slave who had a brilliant legal and political career in France, and Felix Eboue, who was appointed governor of Guadeloupe in 1936.

Hégésippe Jean Légitimus was made Chevalier of the Legion of Honour in 1937. He was obliged to stay in France because of the declaration of war and died in Angles-sur-l'Anglin on 29 November 1944. Following a proposal by General de Gaulle, his remains were returned to Guadeloupe where he was given a state funeral. Several boulevards in Guadeloupe are named after Hégésippe and the main one has his bust displayed, perpetuating the memory of this great black leader and politician. During the commemoration of the sesquicentennial of the abolition of slavery in May 1988 several plaques were unveiled in his memory in front of more than fifty of his descendants. The commemoration was chaired by Gésip Légitimus, a grandson of this exceptional man.

Hégésippe's son, Victor-Étienne Légitimus, journalist and husband of the actress Darling Légitimus, created La Solidarité Antillaise (The Caribbean Solidarity) to defend the interests of his compatriots. He actively participated in the creation of The Movement Against Racism and For Friendship Amongst Peoples (MRAP) and The International League Against Racism and Anti-Semitism (LICRA).

Légitimus wrote in an article in The People, 4 February 1894:—

"The free man is made for speaking, as is the bird for singing.

Woe be he if, intelligent, able to be useful to his people, to humanity thanks to his moral and intellectual faculties, he satisfies himself with vegetating miserably between fear and lazy pleasures!

We are made for the struggle

And whichever way we choose to direct our faculties,

It as an imperious law that impels us to implement them.(...)

I want mankind happy and smiling, I want a proclaimed and recognized equality between all and by all.

I want the light to be diffused in torrents, profusely; no more ignorant people and no more proletarians!

All men reunited as one huge family sharing the air, the sun, the water and the bread, with a kiss."
