= Georges Dagonia =

Guadeloupean politician

Georges Dagonia (born 9 December 1930 in Guadeloupe; died 29 September 2007) is a politician from Guadeloupe who was elected to the French Senate in 1977.
