= Lucette Michaux-Chevry =

French politician (1929–2021)

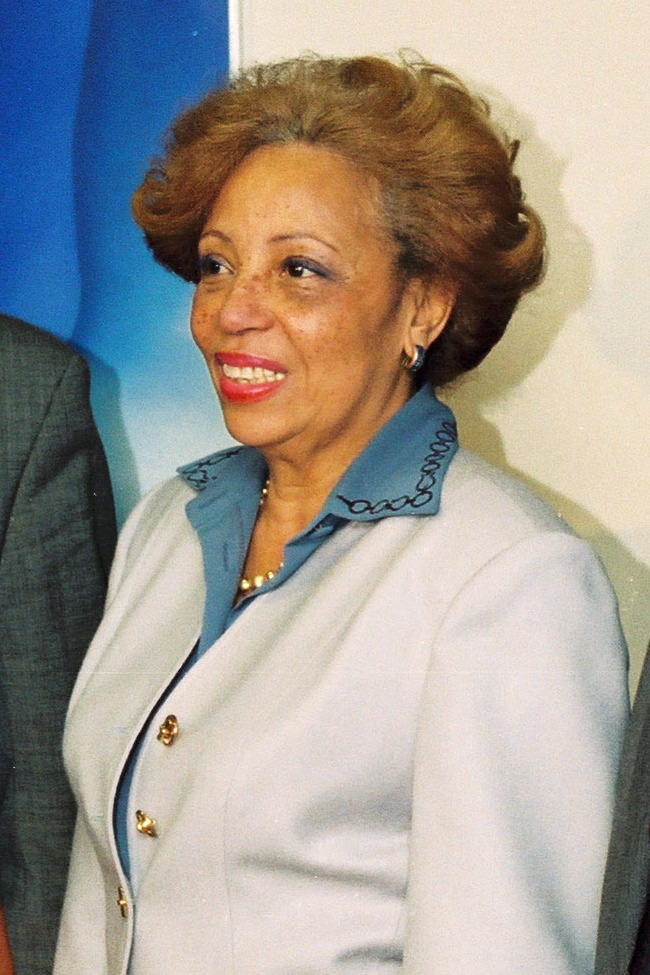
- Born: 5 March 1929; Saint-Claude, Guadeloupe
- Died: 9 September 2021 (aged 92); Gourbeyre, Guadeloupe
- Education: Sorbonne
- Occupation: Politician
- Spouse: Henri Michaux
- Children: Marie-Luce Penchard

Lucette Michaux-Chevry (5 March 1929 – 9 September 2021) was a French politician who served as President of the Regional Council of the overseas department of Guadeloupe between 1992 and 2004. She was nicknamed the "Iron Lady of the Caribbean" because she was "for a long time the strong woman of the department."

== Life and work ==
Michaux-Chevry was born in 1929 in Saint-Claude, Guadeloupe, as the fourth of ten children, and completed her law studies at the Sorbonne University in Paris.

She was the first Guadeloupean woman to enter government service when she won her first election in 1959 becoming a municipal councilor for her town of Saint-Claude. She won just eight days after the birth of her son.

=== Political achievements ===
An ardent member of the Socialist Party, Michaux-Chevry supported French presidential candidate Valéry Giscard d'Estaing in 1981. She was elected to the post of Regional President in 1992 for the first time, then reelected in January 1993, and in 1995. She was elected Mayor of Basse-Terre, Guadeloupe. She was elected to the French senate 1995, and also in 1995, French president Jacques Chirac named her an advisor.

According to her obituary in Le Monde,

She did not abandon her native Guadeloupe, where she multiplied the mandates almost until the end of her life: she was in total three times mayor (Gourbeyre, then Basse-Terre), twice senator (from 1995 to 2011), twice deputy (from 1986 to 1993) and twice president of the region (from 1992 to 2004). In January 2019, she resigned from the presidency of the agglomeration community Grand Sud Caraïbe and announced, at nearly 90 years old, to put an end to her political career, causing an earthquake locally.

However, Michaux-Chevry did not leave politics totally. After she resigned her presidency post in 2019, she retained another position as deputy to the mayor of Basse-Terre. At the time, the mayor was her daughter Marie-Luce Penchard,

=== Personal life ===
Lucette was married at a young age to printer Henri Michaux but became a widow when her two children were still young.

Her daughter, Marie-Luce Penchard, became a minister under the Nicolas Sarkozy presidency, and like her mother, she has pursued a career in local and national politics.

=== Death and tributes ===
Michaux-Chevry died on 9 September 2021at her home in Gourbeyre, Guadeloupe from throat cancer, at the age of 92.
