= Marcel Gargar =

Marcel Gargar (July 19, 1911 in Guadeloupe – December 24, 2004) was a politician from Guadeloupe who was elected to the French Senate in 1968 .

== Bibliography ==
- page on the French Senate website
- Obituary Notice
