= Maurice Satineau =

French politician (1891–1960)

Member of the French Senate
- In office 1948–1958
- Constituency: Guadeloupe

Member of the French Chamber of Deputies
- In office 1936–1942
- Constituency: Guadeloupe

Personal details
- Born: September 18, 1891 Baie Mahault, Guadeloupe, France
- Died: September 30, 1960 (aged 69) Paris, France
- Occupation: Politician, civil rights activist, publisher
- Known for: Founder of La Dépêche Africaine; leader of Comité de défense de la race noire; early black civil rights activism in France

Military service
- Allegiance: France
- Branch: French Army
- Service years: 1914–1915
- Unit: Medic

Maurice Satineau (born 18 September 1891 in Baie Mahault, Guadeloupe; died 13 September 1960 in Paris, France) was a politician from Guadeloupe who served in the Senate from 1948 to 1958 and the French Chamber of Deputies from 1936 to 1942 (the Chamber was not summoned between 1940 and 1942).

== Biography ==
Maurice Satineau was born in 1891 in Guadeloupe into a modest family as the son of Marie Romage and her husband Pierre Satineau. His father died when Satineau was 16. Details about his early life remain unclear; he may have lived with an uncle and learned the trade of ship carpentry there. Claims that he earned a law degree in Paris at the École des hautes études commerciales, won prizes from the Académie française and the Académie des sciences morales et politiques, or was decorated as a member of the Resistance are incorrect.

Around 1912, Satineau was living in Paris working as a mechanic. In September 1914, he volunteered for military service and served as a medic until he was discharged in February 1915 due to chronic bronchitis. From December 1915 to December 1916, he worked for the welfare office, and from October 1917 he was employed as an assistant in the Hygiene and Health Department of the Paris Police Prefecture.

On 8 February 1919, Satineau left the prefecture and launched the weekly newspaper La plus belle France. The publication included contributions from colonialist writers such as Maurice Rondet-Saint, as well as Guadeloupean intellectuals like Henry Bérenger, who would later become France’s ambassador to the United States, and literary scholar Serge Denis, who later joined the Resistance. However, Satineau was forced to discontinue the paper in early 1920.

In 1926, he became secretary general of the Committee for the Defence of the Black Race (Comité de défense de la race noire), an early French black civil rights organisation which emerged from a split within the Committee for the Defence of the Negro Race (Comité de défense de la race nègre). The division reflected a conflict between an anti-colonialist, Pan-Africanist faction led by founder Lamine Senghor and an assimilationist faction around Satineau, which fundamentally supported French colonial policy and its so-called "civilising mission" while demanding equal rights and treatment as French citizens.

In 1928 he founded the journal La Dépêche Africaine, a globally popular magazine of the Committee for the Defence of the Black Race. Contributors included René Maran, Léon Jouhaux, Ouanilou Behanzin, Odet Denys, Georges Tovalou, Samuel Ralaimongo, and sisters Jeanne and Paulette Nardal. Initially published biweekly and later monthly, the magazine had a circulation of about 10,000 copies and was distributed in the colonies with official permission; at times it also included an English-language page. The journal was temporarily important for the early Négritude movement, but in general pro-colonial and assimilative. In 1956, the journal ceased publication.

From 1936 to 1940, Satineau represented Guadeloupe as a deputy in the French Parliament. On 10 July 1940, he voted to grant full powers to Marshal Philippe Pétain. During the Vichy regime, he arranged the escape of Jewish refugees for a fee of 20,000 francs per person, to send them to the Antilles, but he likely also benefited financially. He maintained contacts with Resistance groups in the south of France but was arrested by German authorities at the Spanish border, interned in Château du Hâ, and later released. In August 1944, he was near the fighting during the Liberation of Paris but did not take part in it.

After the war, Satineau struggled to re-establish himself in Guadeloupe but returned to political life during the French Fourth Republic. On 14 November 1948, he was elected to the French Senate representing Guadeloupe and was re-elected in May 1952, serving until 8 June 1958. His role in the escape of Jewish families during the war remained controversial during the 1950s.

Satineau died September 30, 1960, in Paris.
