= 2024 French legislative election in Haute-Corse =

Following the first round of the 2024 French legislative election on 30 June 2024, runoff elections in each constituency where no candidate received a vote share greater than 50 percent were scheduled for 7 July. Candidates permitted to stand in the runoff elections needed to either come in first or second place in the first round or achieve more than 12.5 percent of the votes of the entire electorate (as opposed to 12.5 percent of the vote share due to low turnout).

== Haute-Corse ==
=== 1st constituency ===
Candidate	Party or alliance		First round		Second round	
Candidate	Party or alliance		Votes	%	Votes	%
Michel Castellani	Regionalists	Femu a Corsica	11,962	31.74	24,667	64.33
Jean-Michel Marchal	National Rally		10,855	28.80	13,677	35.67
Julien Morganti	Miscellaneous centre	Independent	5,436	14.42		
Sacha Bastelica	New Popular Front	La France Insoumise	3,353	8.90		
Céline Caravellazi	Miscellaneous centre	Radical Party	2,045	5.43		
Nicolas Battini	Regionalists	Miscellaneous far-right	1,603	4.25		
Jean-Baptiste Lucciardi	Regionalists	Independent	1,471	3.90		
Jean-Baptiste Lucciardi	Sovereigntist right	Independent	393	1.04		
Jean-Michel Lamberti	Reconquête		370	0.98		
Olivier Josué	Far-left	Lutte Ouvrière	203	0.54		
Total			37,691	100.00	38,344	100.00
Valid votes			37,691	97.76	38,344	95.46
Invalid votes			363	0.94	664	1.65
Blank votes			499	1.29	1,160	2.89
Total votes			38,553	100.00	40,168	100.00
Registered voters/turnout			62,110	62.07	62,118	64.66

=== 2nd constituency ===
Candidate	Party or alliance		First round		Second round	
Candidate	Party or alliance		Votes	%	Votes	%
François-Xavier Ceccoli	Miscellaneous right	Independent	15,100	34.05	24,458	54.48
Jean-Félix Acquaviva	Regionalists	Femu a Corsica	12,698	28.63	20,437	45.52
Sylvie Jouart	National Rally		11,275	25.42		
Hélène Sanchez	New Popular Front	The Ecologists	2,668	6.02		
Antò Carli	Regionalists	Independent	2,277	5.13		
Viviane Rongione	Far-left	Lutte Ouvrière	280	0.63		
Marie-Louise Mariani	Regionalists	Independent	50	0.11		
Jean-Antoine Giacomi	Regionalists	Independent	0	0.00		
Total			44,348	100.00	44,895	100.00
Valid votes			44,348	98.16	44,895	95.70
Invalid votes			377	0.83	696	1.48
Blank votes			454	1.00	1,323	2.82
Total votes			45,179	100.00	46,914	100.00
Registered voters/turnout			67,927	66.51	67,917	69.08
