= Arrondissements of the Haute-Corse department =

Administrative divisions of Haute-Corse, France

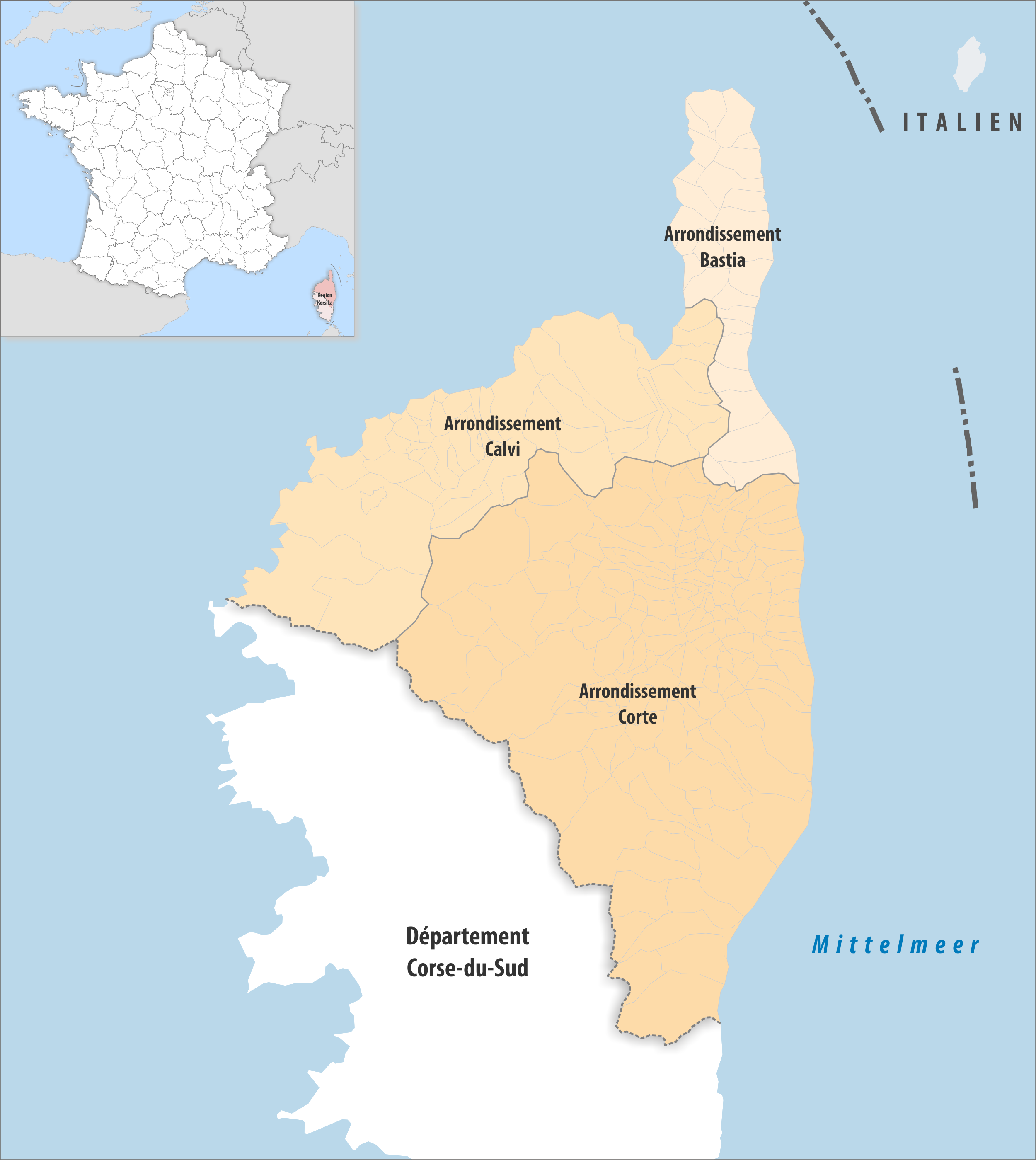
Map of arrondissements of the Haute-Corse department.

The 3 arrondissements of the Haute-Corse department are:

1. Arrondissement of Bastia, (prefecture of the Haute-Corse department: Bastia) with 27 communes. The population of the arrondissement was 93,200 in 2021.
2. Arrondissement of Calvi, (subprefecture: Calvi) with 51 communes. The population of the arrondissement was 31,219 in 2021.
3. Arrondissement of Corte, (subprefecture: Corte) with 158 communes. The population of the arrondissement was 60,236 in 2021.

== History ==
In 1800 the arrondissements of Bastia, Calvi and Corte were established as part of the department Golo. Between 1811 and 1976 these arrondissements were part of the department Corse. The arrondissement of Calvi was disbanded in 1926, and restored in 1943. Since 1976 Bastia, Calvi and Corte have been arrondissements of the department Haute-Corse.

On 1 January 2010, the four cantons of Alto-di-Casaconi, Fiumalto-d'Ampugnani, Campoloro-di-Moriani and Vescovato that previously belonged to the arrondissement of Bastia were added to the arrondissement of Corte, and the two cantons of Le Haut-Nebbio and La Conca-d'Oro to the arrondissement of Calvi.
