= Haute-Corse =

Haute-Corse Corsica suprana / Cismonte / Alta Corsica (Corsican) Upper Corsica
- Department
- Cismonte
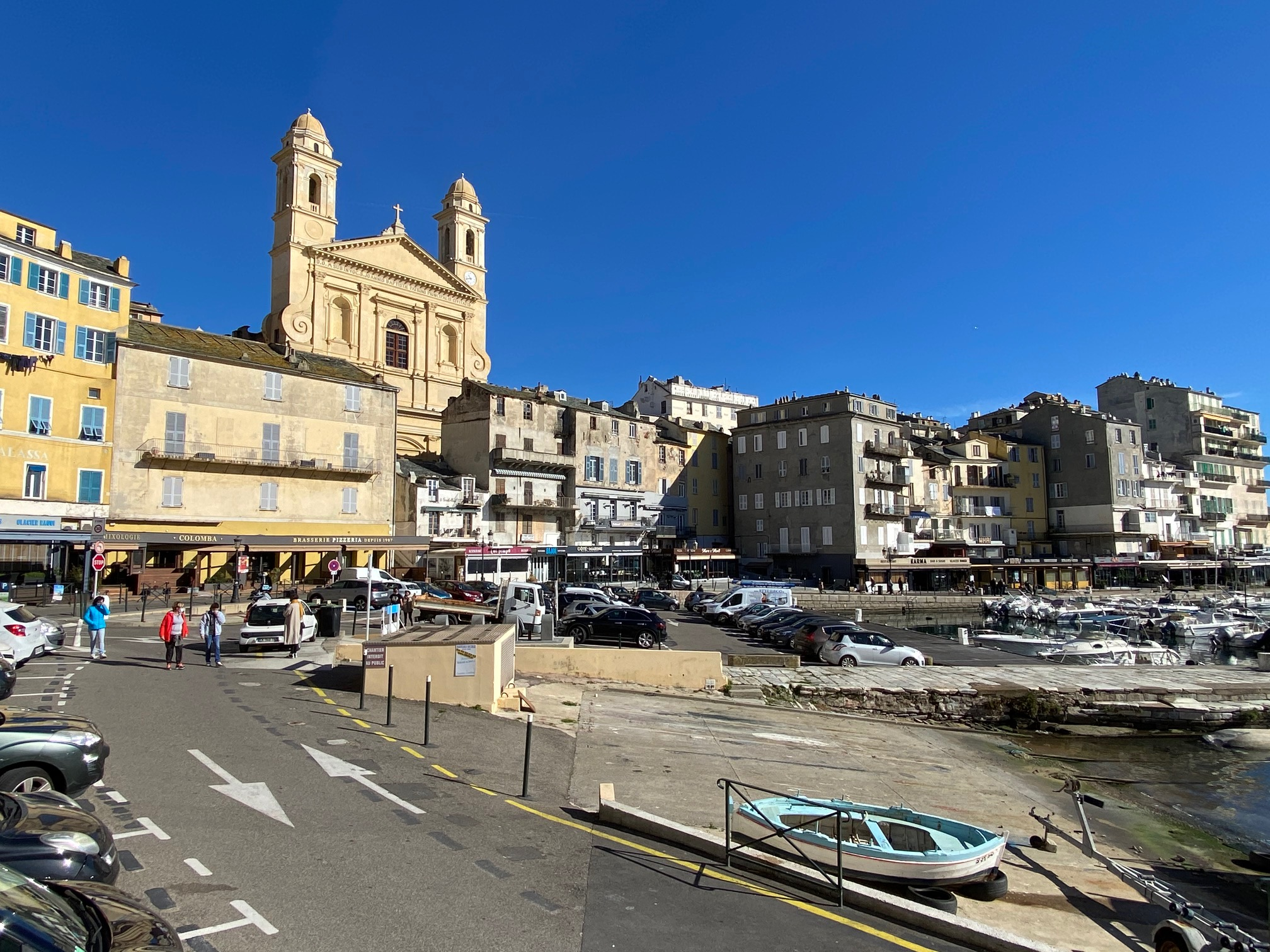
- St Jean Baptiste Cathedral

- Flag Coat of arms

- Location of Haute-Corse in France
- Coordinates: 42°28′N 9°12′E
- Country: France
- Region: Corsica
- Prefecture: Bastia
- Subprefectures: Calvi; Corte

Government
  - Prefect: François Ravier

Area^{1}
  - Total: 4,666 km^{2} (1,802 sq mi)

Population (2023)
  - Total: 187,180
  - Rank: 92nd
  - Density: 40.12/km^{2} (103.9/sq mi)
- Time zone: UTC+1 (CET)
  - Summer (DST): UTC+2 (CEST)
- Department number: 2B
- Arrondissements: 3
- Cantons: 15
- Communes: 236
- ^1 French Land Register data, which exclude estuaries, and lakes, ponds, and glaciers larger than 1 km^{2}

Haute-Corse (French: [ot kɔʁs]; Corsican: Corsica suprana [ˈkorsiɡa zuˈprana], Cismonte [tʃiˈzmɔnte] (Note: Also Italian: [tʃiˈzmonte].) or Alta Corsica; English: Upper Corsica) is a department of France, consisting of the northern part of the island of Corsica. The corresponding departmental territorial collectivity merged with that of Corse-du-Sud on 1 January 2018, forming the single territorial collectivity of Corsica, with territorial elections coinciding with the dissolution of the separate councils. However, even though its administrative powers were ceded to the new territorial collectivity, it continues to remain an administrative department in its own right. In 2023, it had a population of 187,180.

== History ==
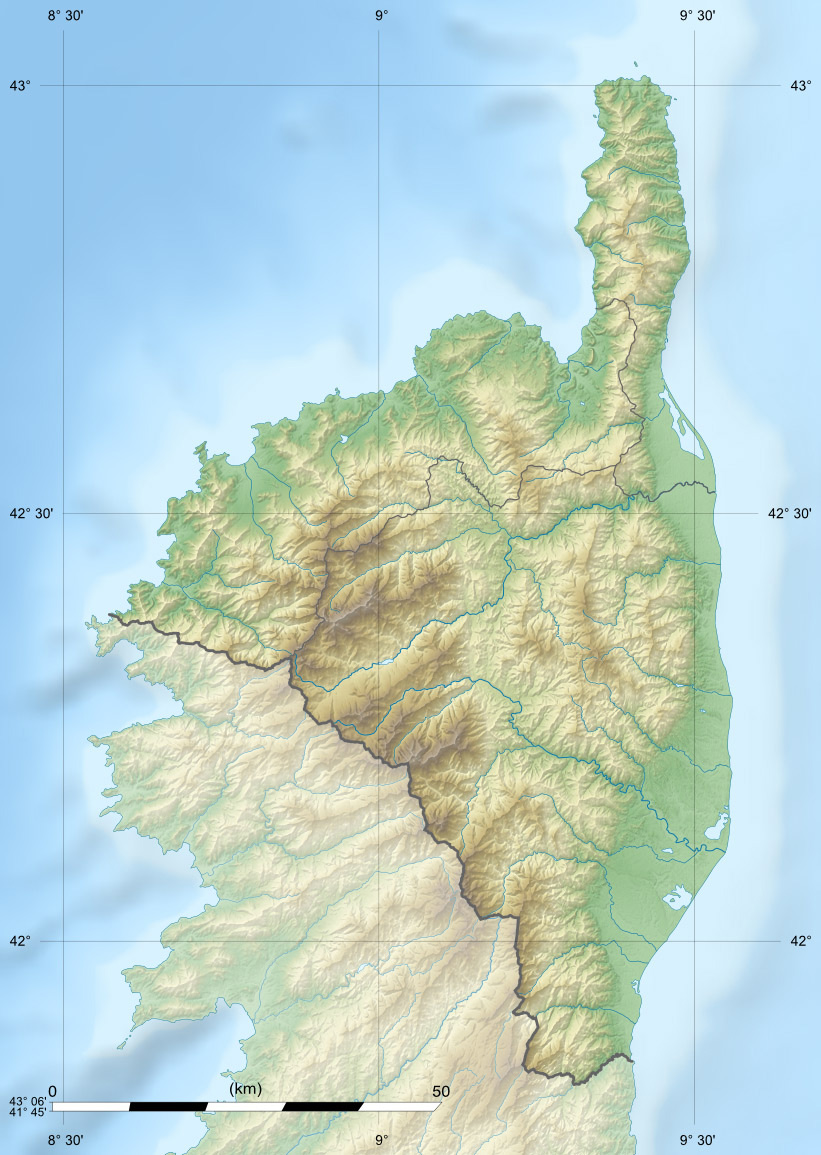
Map of Haute-Corse

The department was formed on 1 January 1976, when the department of Corsica was divided into Upper Corsica (Haute-Corse) and Southern Corsica (Corse-du-Sud). The department corresponds exactly to the former department of Golo, which existed between 1793 and 1811.

On 6 July 2003, a referendum on increased autonomy was voted down by a very thin majority: 50.98 percent against to 49.02 percent for. This was a major setback for French Minister of the Interior Nicolas Sarkozy, who had hoped to use Corsica as the first step in his decentralization policies.

On 1 January 2018, Haute-Corse's administrative powers were partly ceded to the new territorial collectivity of Corsica.

== Geography ==
The department is surrounded on three sides by the Mediterranean Sea and on the south by the department of Corse-du-Sud. Rivers include the Abatesco, Golo and Tavignano.

=== Principal towns ===
The most populous commune is Bastia, the prefecture. As of 2023, there are 7 communes with more than 5,000 inhabitants:

Commune	Population (2023)
Bastia	46,867
Borgo	10,311
Corte	7,819
Biguglia	7,642
Lucciana	6,923
Furiani	6,585
Calvi	5,788

== Demographics ==
The people living in the department are called Supranacci. Most people of the department live in the coastal areas.

Historical population
Year	Pop.	±% p.a.
1968	115,702	—
1975	125,284	+1.14%
1982	131,574	+0.70%
1990	131,563	−0.00%
1999	141,603	+0.82%
2007	159,847	+1.53%
2012	170,828	+1.34%
2017	177,689	+0.79%
2023	187,180	+0.87%
Source: INSEE

== Politics ==
The current prefect of Haute-Corse is François Ravier, who took office on 3 June 2019.

=== Current National Assembly representatives ===
Constituency	Member	Party
Haute-Corse's 1st constituency	Michel Castellani	Femu a Corsica
Haute-Corse's 2nd constituency	François-Xavier Ceccoli	Miscellaneous right

== Tourism ==
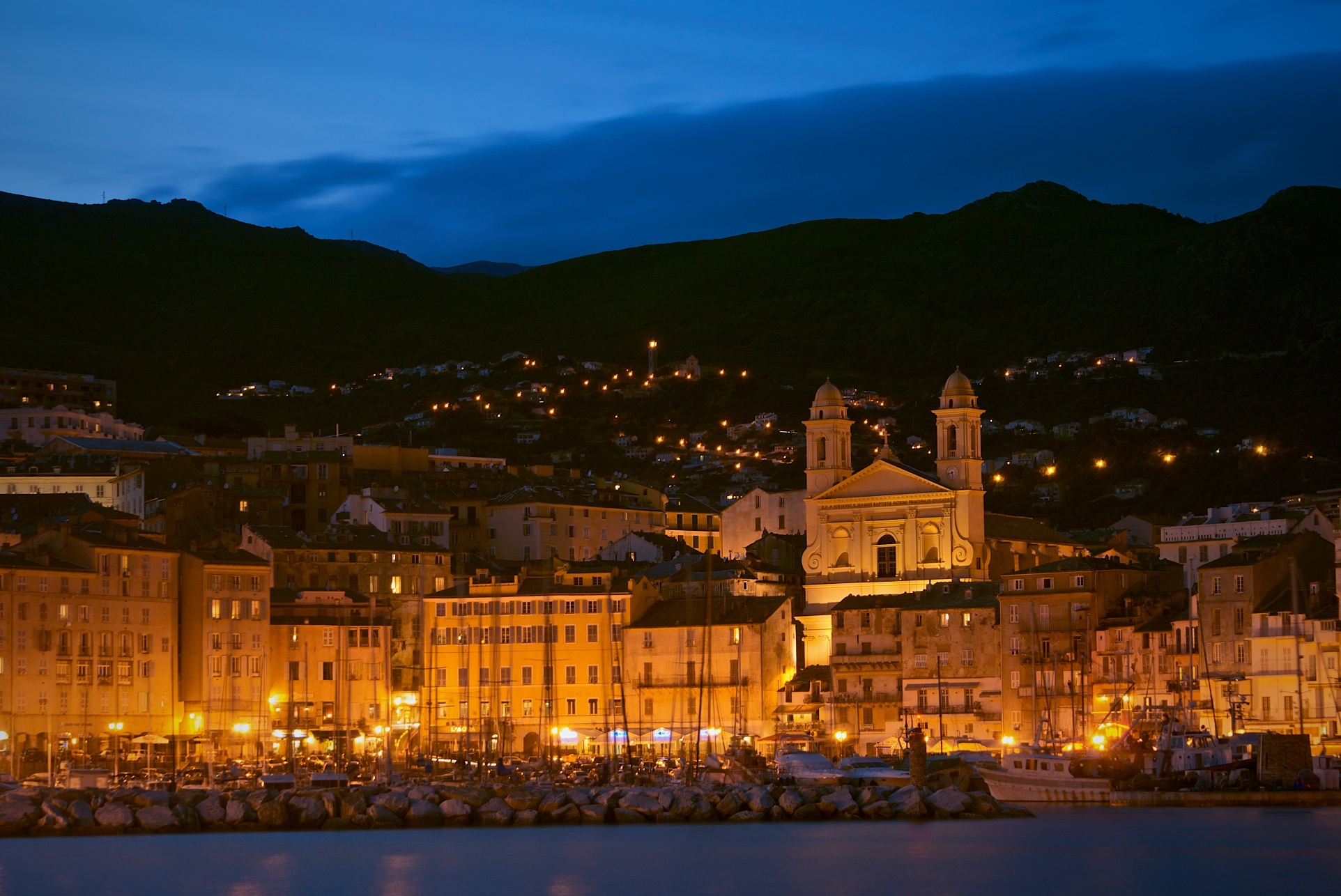
Bastia

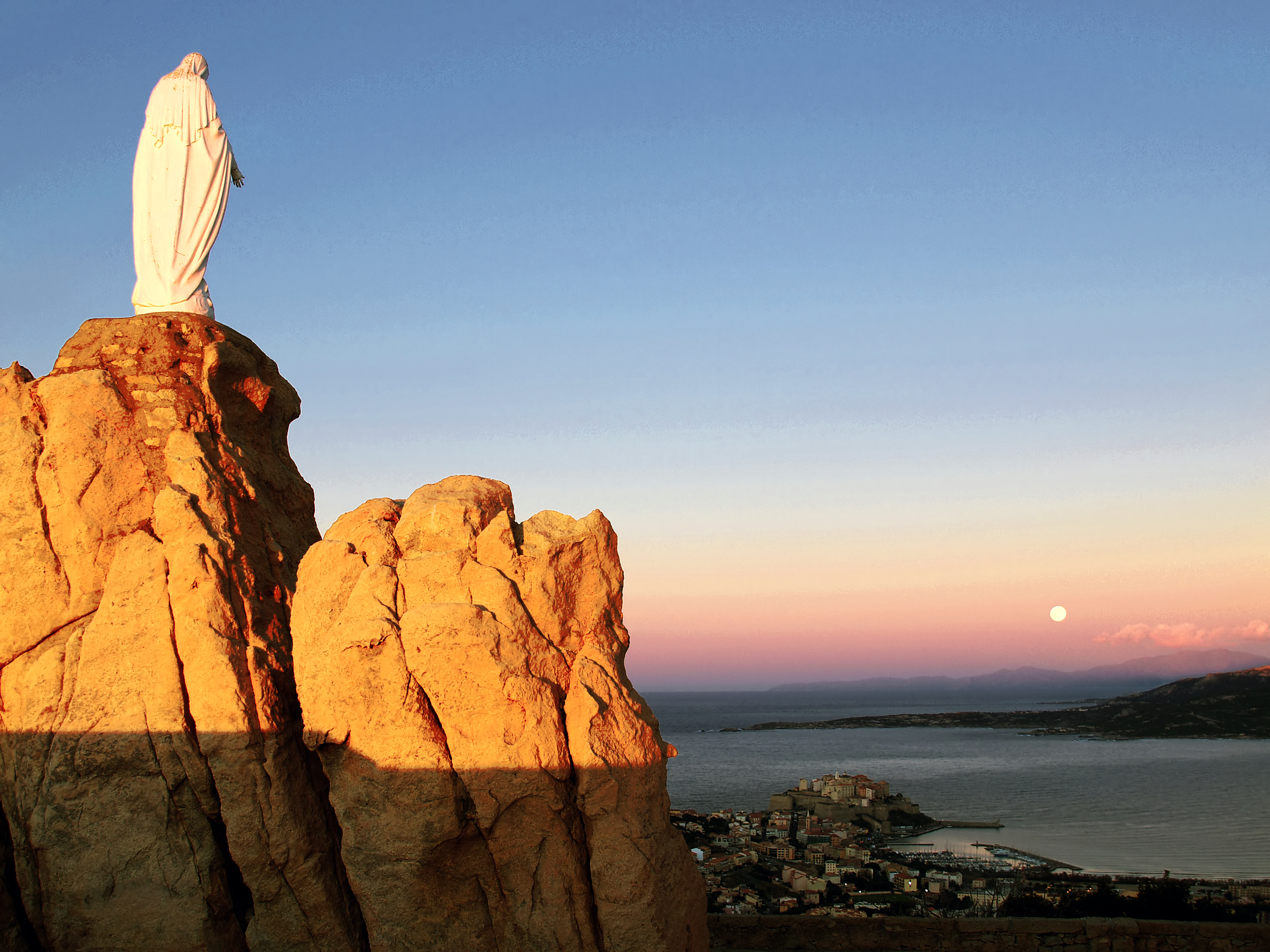
Calvi seen from Notre-Dame de la Serra

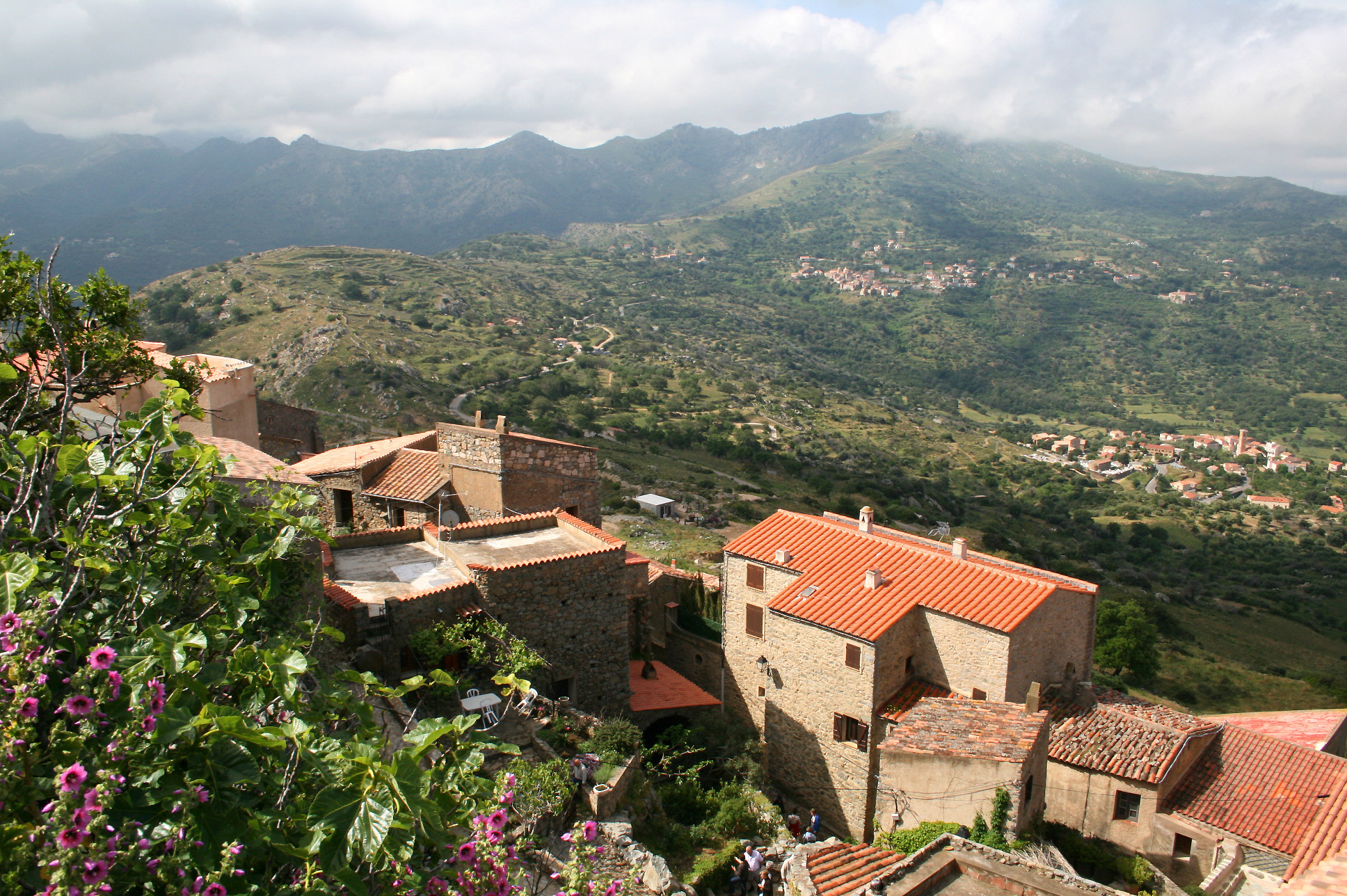
Sant'Antonino, one of the most beautiful villages of France

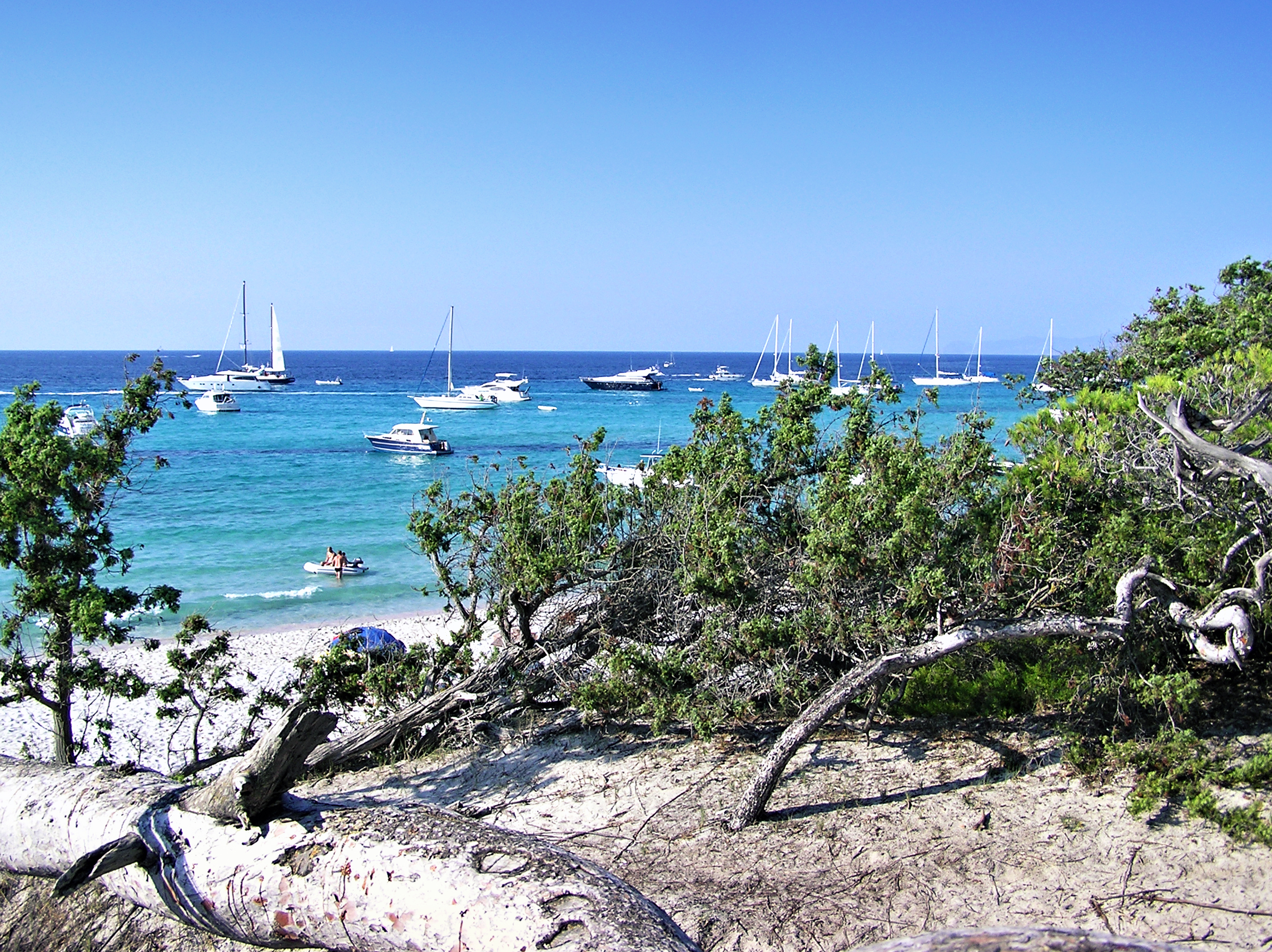
Désert des Agriates

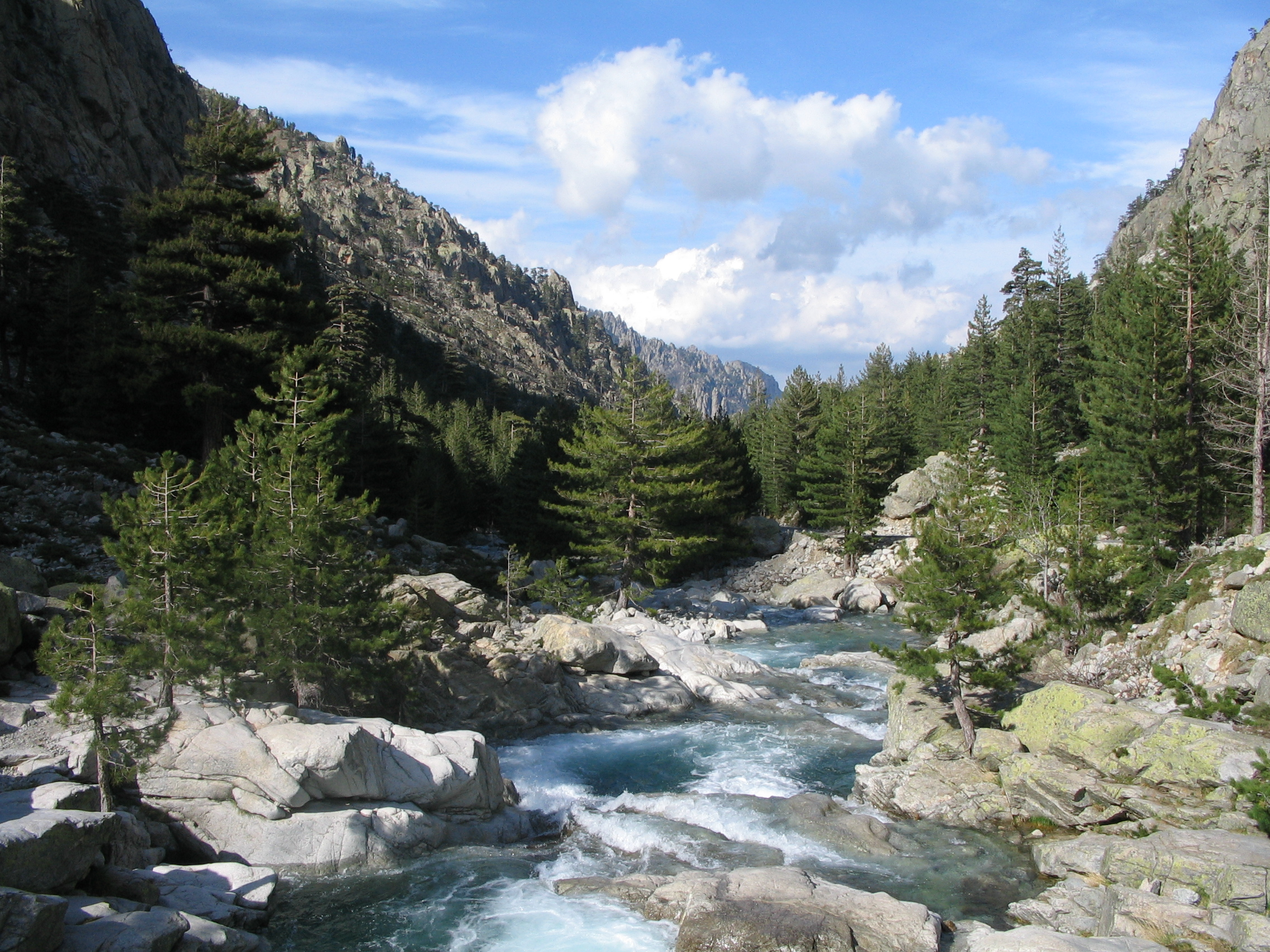
Restonica Gorge

== See also ==
- Cantons of the Haute-Corse department
- Communes of the Haute-Corse department
- Arrondissements of the Haute-Corse department
