= Haute-Corse's 2nd constituency =

Constituency of the National Assembly of France

2nd constituency of Haute-Corse
- inline Constituency of the National Assembly of France

- The two constituencies of Haute-Corse

- Haute-Corse in France
- Deputy: François-Xavier Ceccoli; DVD
- Department: Haute-Corse
- Cantons: Alto-di-Casaconi, Belgodère, Bustanico, Calenzana, Calvi, Campoloro-di-Moriani, Castifao-Morosaglia, Corte, Fiumalto-d'Ampugnani, Ghisoni, l'Ile-Rousse, Moïta-Verde, Niolu-Omessa, Orezza-Alesani, Prunelli-di-Fiumorbo, Venaco, Vescovato, Vezzani
- Registered voters: 80,460

The 2nd constituency of Haute-Corse is a French legislative constituency in the Haute-Corse département.

== Deputies ==
Election	Member	Party
1988	Pierre Pasquini	RPR
1993	Pierre Pasquini	RPR
1997	Paul Patriarche	UDF
2002	Paul Giacobbi	PRG
2007	Paul Giacobbi	PRG
2012	Paul Giacobbi	PRG
2017	Jean-Félix Acquaviva	PaC
2022	Jean-Félix Acquaviva	FaC
2024	François-Xavier Ceccoli	DVD

== Election results ==
=== 2024 ===
Candidate	Party	Alliance	First round		Second round	
Candidate	Party	Alliance	Votes	%	Votes	%
François-Xavier Ceccoli	IND	DVD	15,100	34.05	24,458	54.48
Jean-Félix Acquaviva	FaC	REG	12,698	28.63	20,437	45.52
Sylvie Jouart	RN		11,275	25.42		
Hélène Sanchez	LE	NPF	2,668	6.02		
Antò Carli	IND	REG	2,277	5.13		
Viviane Rongione	LO		280	0.63		
Marie-Louise Mariani	IND	REG	50	0.11		
Jean-Antoine Giacomi	IND	REG	0	0.00		
Valid votes			44,348	98.16	44,895	95.70
Blank votes			454	1.00	1,323	2.82
Null votes			377	0.83	696	1.48
Turnout			45,179	66.51	46,914	69.08
Abstentions			22,748	33.49	21,003	30.92
Registered voters			67,927		67,917	
Result			DVD GAIN OVER FaC			

=== 2022 ===
Legislative Election 2022: Haute-Corse's 2nd constituency
Party	Candidate	Votes	%	±%
Femu a Corsica (REG)	Jean-Félix Acquaviva	10,670	33.46	-2.98
DVD	François-Xavier Ceccoli	9,267	29.06	N/A
CL	Lionel Mortini	5,736	17.99	N/A
RN	Jean Cardi	3,658	11.47	+7.53
PCF	Amélie Raffaelli-Franceschi	1,879	5.89	+2.21
DLF (UPF)	Marie Dominique Salducci	391	1.23	N/A
LO	Viviane Rongione	215	0.67	+0.41
PP	Baronne ML Mariani	75	0.24	−0.06
Turnout		31,891	48.20	−5.98
2nd round result
Femu a Corsica (REG)	Jean-Félix Acquaviva	16,777	50.23	-12.93
DVD	François-Xavier Ceccoli	16,621	49.77	N/A
Turnout		33,398	51.66	−2.69
Femu a Corsica hold				

=== 2017 ===
Candidate	Label	First round		Second round	
Candidate	Label	Votes	%	Votes	%
Jean-Félix Acquaviva	REG	12,785	36.44	21,302	63.16
Francis Giudici	REM	8,213	23.41	12,425	36.84
Stéphanie Grimaldi	LR	4,938	14.08		
Jean-Martin Mondoloni	DVD	4,700	13.40		
Dadou Jacob Dit Luzie-Albertini	FN	1,382	3.94		
Marie-Jeanne Fedi	PCF	1,290	3.68		
Jean Moghraoui	FI	1,066	3.04		
Henri Malosse	DVG	421	1.20		
Le Baron Mariani	DIV	104	0.30		
Lionel Sonnette	DIV	94	0.27		
Didier Gibaud	EXG	90	0.26		
Votes		35,083	100.00	33,727	100.00
Valid votes		35,083	98.12	33,727	94.08
Blank votes		436	1.22	1,404	3.92
Null votes		236	0.66	720	2.01
Turnout		35,755	54.18	35,851	54.35
Abstentions		30,233	45.82	30,115	45.65
Registered voters		65,988		65,966	
Source: Ministry of the Interior

=== 2012 ===
Legislative Election 2012: Haute-Corse 1st - 2nd round
Party	Candidate	Votes	%	±%
PRG	Paul Giacobbi	23,396	64.34	
UMP	Stéphanie Grimaldi	12,968	35.66	
Turnout		38,224	59.78	
PRG hold		Swing		

=== 2007 ===
Legislative Election 2007: Haute-Corse 2nd - 2nd round
Party	Candidate	Votes	%	±%
PRG	Paul Giacobbi	23,100	52.21	
UMP	Stéphanie Grimaldi	21,145	47.79	
Turnout		45,325	75.0	
PRG hold		Swing		

== Sources ==
- *"Résultats électoraux officiels en France" (in French). 2012.
- "Résultats électoraux officiels en France" (in French). 2007.
- "Résultats électoraux officiels en France" (in French). 2002.
