= Jean-Félix Acquaviva =

French politician

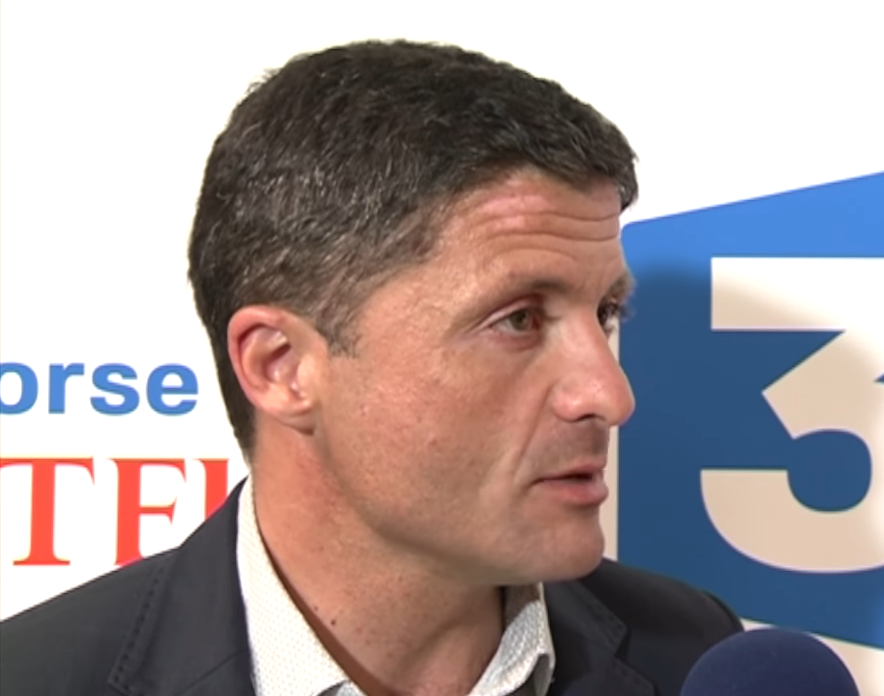
Portrait of Jean-Félix Acquaviva

Jean-Félix Acquaviva (born 19 March 1973 in Bastia) is a French politician representing Pè a Corsica. He was elected to the French National Assembly on 18 June 2017, representing Haute-Corse's 2nd constituency.

He was re-elected in the 2022 election under the Femu a Corsica banner.

== Biography ==
Born on March 19, 1973, in Bastia (Haute-Corse), he is the cousin of Gilles Simeoni.

He is a member of the autonomist party Femu a Corsica and thus represents the coalition of the nationalist party Pè a Corsica, between Femu a Corsica and the independence party Corsica Libera.

Mayor of Lozzi(Haute-Corse) from 2008 to 2017, he was also an executive advisor to the Politics of Corsica and headed the Corsican Transport Authority from 2016 to 2017. Following his election as a member of parliament, he resigned from these positions to devote himself to his mandate as a member of parliament.

Indeed, at the end of the second round of the 2017 French legislative elections, he was elected deputy for the second constituency of Haute-Corse's 2nd constituency, with 63.05% of the votes cast, against Francis Giudici (mayor of Ghisonaccia, candidate for Renaissance (French political party) en Marche).

In December 2018, he was elected national secretary of the Femu a Corsica party.

He was re-elected on June 19, 2022, in the second round of the legislative elections, with 16,777 votes out of 67,924 registered voters, representing 24.70% of registered voters and 50.23% of votes cast.

In the early legislative elections of 2024, he received only 45.52% of the vote and was defeated in the second round by François-Xavier Ceccoli.

== See also ==
- 2017 French legislative election
- Haute-Corse's 2nd constituency
