= François-Xavier Ceccoli =

French politician (born 1968)

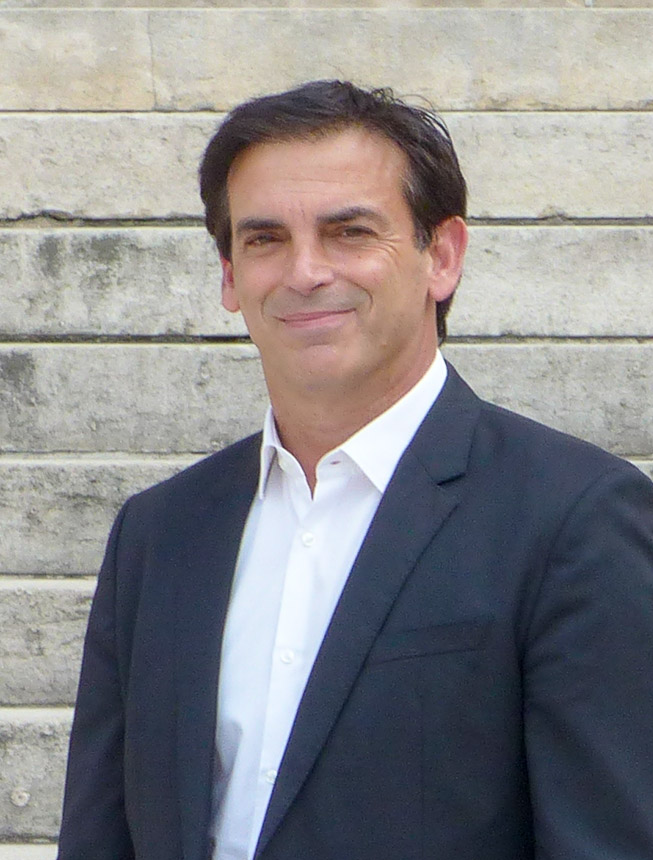

Member of the French National Assembly for Haute-Corse's 2nd constituency
- Incumbent
- Assumed office 18 July 2024
- Preceded by: Jean-Félix Acquaviva

Personal details
- Born: 27 October 1968 (age 57)
- Party: The Republicans

François-Xavier Ceccoli (born 27 October 1968) is a French politician who was elected member of the National Assembly for Haute-Corse's 2nd constituency in 2024.
