= FLNC-Canal Habituel =

Corsican guerilla group

National Liberation Front of Corsica - Canal Habituel
- Fronte di Liberazione Naziunale di a Corsica – Canale Abituale
- Founder: Alain Orsoni
- Leader: Alain Orsoni
- Founded: 17 October 1990
- Dates active: 17 October 1990 - 5 May 1996
- Dissolved: 29 January 1997
- Split from: National Liberation Front of Corsica (1976-1990)
- Split to: FLNC-5 May
- Newspaper: A Paese
- Active regions: Corsica; Actions throughout mainland France and in Sardinia
- Ideology: Corsican autonomism Corsican nationalism (factions until 1996); Liberalism; European federalism
- Political position: Big tent
- Wars: Corsican conflict

The National Liberation Front of Corsica - Canal Habituel (French for "Habitual Channel", Corsican: Fronte di Liberazione Naziunale di a Corsica - Canale Abituale; abbreviated FLNC-CA) was an armed paramilitary and guerrilla organisation on the island of Corsica.

The FLNC-CA originated during the breakup of the National Liberation Front of Corsica (FLNC), a process which began in 1988 following a ceasefire and the start of negotiations with the government to secure Corsican autonomy. This saw the Corsican nationalist movement break into two camps: the "Habituels", who wanted to end the ongoing Corsican conflict by securing a compromise with the French government for further autonomy and perhaps eventual independence, and the "Historiques", who wanted to continue armed struggle and secure Corsican independence through insurgency and armed insurrection. The Habituels, gathered around Alain Orsoni, took control of the FLNC's central command following during a Historique-led dissident campaign, creating the FLNC-CA.

During the entirety of the group's existence, the FLNC-CA was engaged in a violent war with the FLNC-Canal Historique, a radical militant armed group formed from the Historique dissidents. During this period, the group had an on-and-off relationship with the French government, starting and ending numerous truces and ceasefires to spur fruitless negotiations. The group lost a significant amount of influence to the Canal Historique, and the war between the two resulted in the death of numerous Habituel leaders. In 1996, the FLNC-CA announced its intent to disarm and dissolve, and Orsoni, then a high-profile criminal in France, fled to Miami, Florida. Many within the group refused to lay down arms, resulting in the creation of the FLNC-5 May. The FLNC-CA dissolved officially on 29 January 1997.

== History ==
=== Background ===
The National Liberation Front of Corsica (FLNC) formed on 5 May 1976. From then on, the group engaged in a prolonged guerrilla war against French authorities on the island of Corsica. The FLNC was quite popular amongst the people of Corsica, and for the most part internal divisions were rare in the first few years of the conflict.

The first divisions began to appear within the FLNC following 1979. A surge of popular support resulting from local influence and the militaristic and oppressive response of French authorities to the conflict, such as their response to the Bastelica-Fesch affair, caused many Corsicans to rally around the FLNC and join the organization in droves. This, coupled with arrests of high-ranking officials, caused the FLNC to adopt a new system of leadership in which two governing bodies, the political cunsigliu (council) and the military ghjunta (junta) governed in tandem.

This system was initially successful, but its problems became evident during the 1981-1982 Defferre accords. The cunsigliu wanted to pursue peace and work alongside the French government for Corsican autonomy, whereas the ghjunta wanted to continue using armed struggle as the primary tool for Corsican independence, avoiding any negotiation with the French state or any political participation in general. Borgo-Lucciana brigade leader and ghjunta member Charles Pieri gained a following within the FLNC for his statements against the Defferre accords, and in 1982 Pieri carried out an assault on a Foreign Legion outpost in Sorbo-Ocagnano, breaking the ceasefire the FLNC set for the duration of the Defferre accords.

In 1983, the FLNC's central command (made up of the cunsigliu and ghjunta) narrowly passed a motion creating a so-called "revolutionary tax" system. Businesses in areas occupied by the FLNC were made to pay a given amount of money to the organisation, and business elsewhere, especially owned by Frenchmen, were at risk of being extorted by the group for money in exchange for keeping their business. This was controversial, and many members of the FLNC, especially those affiliated with the cunsigliu, viewed this as immoral. A major point of debate regarding the revolutionary tax was how much of it was going back to the FLNC.Members of the ghjunta, who led the FLNC's brigades, were accused of extorting businesses and not diverting the money to the FLNC's command. This accusation was common amongst the urban brigades of the FLNC, mainly François Santoni's Gravona brigade, centred around the suburbs of northeastern Ajaccio, and Charles Pieri's Borgo-Lucciana brigade, operating in Bastia's southern suburbs. These accusations gained a large amount of attention following the 1983 Schock affair, in which Gravona brigade members assassinated a barber who refused to pay a tax imposed on him by the brigade. An internal FLNC investigation revealed this money was going to Santoni rather than the FLNC itself. Many moved to punish Santoni, but Pieri and other radical members came to his defense, and due to the two-branch system, nothing could be done to punish him.

After the Schock affair, the distance between the consigliu and the ghjunta gradually worsened, and by 1987 they had begun to refuse cooperation. The cunsigliu, headed at this time by cunsigliu president Pierre Poggioli, began organizing a joint congress to hash out issues between the brigade leaders in the ghjunta and deputies in the cunsigliu. Instrumental in this process was Alain Orsoni, who was a cunsigliu member representing the Ajaccio region. The first congress was held in the Gravona area of Ajaccio region and dealt with the controversial issue of centralization and autonomy. Gravona was likely chosen due to the Gravona brigade leader, François Santoni, being an ardent autonomist who had disobeyed central committee orders many times, most notably when he ordered his brigade to carry out the attempted assassination of Valéry Giscard d’Estaing in 1981.

=== FLNC split and foundation ===
On 8 May 1988, François Mitterrand was re-elected to his position as president of France. One of Mitterrand's goals in his first term was peace in Corsica, and despite temporarily abandoning this policy following the FLNC's withdrawal from the Defferre process and the escalation of violence following it, Mitterrand was open to further discussions on Corsican autonomy. On the night of Mitterrand's re-election, the FLNC called a ceasefire to attempt to facilitate negotiations with the newly re-elected government. This was a highly controversial decision within the FLNC, and by mid-1989 several high-ranking officials, mostly from the ghjunta, including Jean-Michel Rossi, François Santoni, Charles Pieri, and Pierre Alessandri, withdrew their brigades from the FLNC. Further dissident splits followed, including an insurrectionary movement in Ajaccio led by Roger Polverelli. The followers of the anti-ceasefire movement earned the name “Historiques” (Storichi in Corsican) due to their strong attachment to the hardline militant ideals of the original FLNC, and a dissident campaign was carried out by these brigades against the remaining FLNC structure from 1988 to 1990.

Pierre Poggioli, leader of the FLNC's joint congress, resigned from the organisation on 16 September 1989 due to the harsh divisions and the so-called "internal war" causing the groups collapse. On paper, this left the FLNC with no proper leader, but many in the cunsigliu began to rally around Alain Orsoni, who had become the group's political leader and ran A Cuncolta Naziunalista, the FLNC's political wing created following the dissolution of the Corsican Movement for Self-Determination. Poggioli would create his own party, the Corsican National Alliance, and armed group, Resistenza, in 1990.

In August 1990, A Cuncolta Naziunalista suffered from numerous controversial splits, as the leadership centred around Orsoni struggled to keep the Historiques remaining in the party from going against their word. This resulted in Orsoni's ousting by Pieri and Santoni, who became joint leaders of the organisation, with Pieri acting as secretary-general in Haute-Corse and Santoni acting as secretary-general of Corse-du-Sud. On 17 October of that same year, Orsoni took control of the FLNC central command, dissolved it, and re-organised it into the FLNC-Canal Habituel (Canale Abituale, FLNC-CA). This was coupled with the creation of the Movement for Self-Determination (Muvimentu per l'Autodeterminazione, MPA), Orsoni's new political party and the FLNC-CA's political wing.

=== Early years on ceasefire ===
The FLNC-CA spent the first months of its existence officially in a ceasefire, attempting to negotiate with the French state and continuing the principles of the original FLNC. However, in practice, the group frequently used armed attacks as a form of political pressure to attempt to steer negotiations in their favour, a strategy which in practice yielded few results. The first example of this occurred just days after the organisation was created, on 26 October 1990. A "spectacular" bomb attack damaged the Aubagne headquarters of Société nationale maritime Corse Méditerranée, a ferry company.

At the same time, Orsoni had become a major enemy of François Santoni, now the leader of the FLNC-Canal Historique (Canale Storicu, FLNC-CS), an armed group formed from a union of the Historique dissidents. The FLNC-CA and FLNC-CS had both denounced each other in press conferences, and Santoni had begun to spread false claims that Orsoni had embezzled money during his time as leader of A Cuncolta Naziunalista. These hostilities turned into a proper feud on 29 November 1990, when a commando of Habituels broke into the press headuarters of U Ribombu, the press organ of the FLNC-Canal Historique, and stole the technical equipment from the printing room. A large calibre bullet was left on the table as a threat by the Habituels. This triggered a long string of assassinations of Habituels by Historiques and vice versa, beginning the so-called Years of Lead.

Fighting between the two FLNC organisations continued into 1991. On 12 February, the FLNC-CA released a press statement condemning the "militaristic drift" of the FLNC-CS. This was followed by a conference of the FLNC-CA in March 1991, in which the group reaffirmed a ceasefire with the French government and shifted focus to primarily combating the influence of the Historiques. The MPA, the group's political wing, cut ties with A Cuncolta, the FLNC-CS's political wing, following this conference.

On 30 May 1991, to protest what they perceived as government inaction, the FLNC-CA launched a large car bomb attack against the General Council of Haute-Corse, resulting in the collapse of part of the building. The main target of this attack was François Giacobbi, president of Haute-Corse's general council and a staunch opponent of the Joxe process and political dialogue with nationalists of any kind. Giacobbi denounced the "Lebanese-style" attack and referred to the guerrillas as "dishonourable bandits". This attack caused a large amount of backlash against the Habituels, with even other nationalists denouncing the action, and was a contributing factor to the departure of Léo Battesti from the FLNC-CA and MPA a year later.

The feud with the FLNC-CS was also accompanied by a feud with Resistenza, another FLNC splinter group in a shaky and often broken alliance with the Historiques. On 15 July 1991, Habituel member Jean-Pierre Leca fired several shots at Resistenza members. He was arrested just days later by French police.

==== Internal divisions ====
The FLNC-CA was itself suffering greatly from internal divisions by mid-1991. Two main factions within the group emerged: one centred around Alain Orsoni, who perceived the ongoing negotiations as mostly fruitless and had been preparing to end the ceasefire, and one centred around Léo Battesti, who wanted the group to disarm entirely and embrace peaceful solutions and civil prosperity to end the Corsican conflict. On 20 August 1991, Battesti spoke to the press and declared that a "nationalist family" no longer existed, and that the Corsican nationalist movement had become far too fractured. Battesti, however, affirmed his personal commitment to peace.

On 22 March 1992, the MPA won four seats in the Corsican territorial elections held that year. The MPA's most major opponents within the Corsican Assembly were within the Corsica Nazione coalition, a far-left and further extreme Corsican nationalist coalition formed by numerous parties, including A Cuncolta Naziunalista, the Corsican National Alliance, and the Union of the Corsican People. Corsica Nazione won nine seats in the 1992 elections.

Further divisions became apparent following the denouncing of the FLNC-CA by Jean-Michel Rossi, a member of the FLNC-Canal Historique, who called the group "abusive". The FLNC-CA held a press conference where they "sentenced" Rossi to death. This action, dubbed extreme by many of the more moderate Habituels, or "Battestisti", caused a further rift in the organisation. A similar backlash occurred following the bombing of the Ajaccio courthouse after the sentencing of a convicted FLNC-CA member.

=== End of ceasefire and escalation of violence ===
The FLNC-CA officially ended its ceasefire towards French authorities on 10 August 1992. The group cited "inaction of the state" and "the absence of strong will amongst Corsican elected officials" as the two major reasons for resuming armed activity. This announcement was coupled with a series of bomb attacks by the organisation in Nice, Paris, Marseille, and Sardinia. The Joxe accords had drawn to a close in April 1992 with the implementation of the autonomy law and the creation of the Executive Council of Corsica.

Following the end of the ceasefire, the group also took a hard stance against the Corsican mafia, which had been rapidly growing in influence during the early 1990s. Mafia members were assassinated or ambushed by Habituels seven times from 18 to 23 August 1992. On 27 September that same year, Habituels captured two mafia drug traffickers and executed them publicly on the walls of the Genoese tower of Girolata. One of the men, Jacky Martin, was a former heroin trafficker for the Corsican Connection. Both were shot in the back of the neck.

On 14 October 1992, Many members of the faction of the FLNC-CA surrounding Léo Battesti resigned. Since the end of the ceasefire, Battesti and his supporters had begun advocating for a complete dissolution of the FLNC-CA. As violence escalated and the dissolution of the FLNC-CA became increasingly unlikely, the faction had become disillusioned with the organisation entirely. Prominent Habituels who resigned include Battesti himself, Marie-France Giovannangeli (general-secretary of the Corsican Workers' Trade Union and sister of current Corsican executive president Gilles Giovannangeli), Yves Stella (prominent FLNC member in the 1980s), and Jean-Paul Calendini. All of these figures resigned from the MPA as well.

The FLNC-CA, looking to expand their influence in their stronghold city of Ajaccio, secured the entire management team of AC Ajaccio. Alain Orsoni, Michel Moretti, and Antoine Antona became the club's figureheads; all three were high-ranking members of the FLNC-Canal Habituel. This group of Habituels continued to manage AC Ajaccio well after the dissolution of the FLNC-Canal Habituel in 1997. Moretti, who had been president since this acquisition, gave his position to Orsoni in July 2008. Orsoni led the group until 2015, and returned to the role of president briefly in 2022.

On 2 December 1992, the FLNC-CA committed a bomb attack on the tax office in Nice, injuring three.

The feud with the FLNC-CS escalated greatly in 1993. To prevent further killings, the FLNC-CA, during a press conference in Corte with 150 armed men present, renounced their death penalty sentence for Jean-Michel Rossi. This, combined with internal conflict within the FLNC-CS due to the Robert Sozzi affair, prevented the Habituels from losing more men in Historique ambushes and assassinations. In December 1994, Habituels assassinated two high-ranking Historiques: Frank Muzy, treasurer for A Cuncolta Naziunalista, and Jean-François Filippi, mayor of Lucciana, president of SC Bastia, and a longtime associate of the FLNC-CS. Much like AC Ajaccio and the Habituels, the Historiques had taken over the internal structure of SC Bastia in 1992.

Habituels took significant losses to the Historiques in early 1995. On 16 February, Jean-Pierre Leca, Orsoni's second-in-command, was assassinated. Luc Belloni, another prominent Habituel, was killed on 23 April. In response to these two actions, An FLNC-CA commando led by Ange-Marie Orsoni, cousin of Alain Orsoni, carried out an attempted assassination of François Santoni on 29 May. Santoni survived, but Stefanu Gallo, Santoni's bodyguard, was killed. This caused the situation to degenerate quickly, and by the end of 1995, dozens of FLNC-CA and FLNC-CS members had been killed, many in chains of tit-for-tat killings.

On 16 February, Ange-Marie Orsoni led yet another assassination attempt on François Santoni, resulting in the death of his bodyguard and close friend Jules Massa. This was during the opening months of the Tralonca process, which Santoni had been spearheading on the side of the FLNC-CS.

==== Corsica Viva split ====
As the Years of Lead continued to be detrimental for the Habituels, many, including Orsoni himself, had begun to discuss a ceasefire or even total disarmament. This occurred alongside a split within the MPA regarding Corsican nationalists feeling distant and unheard compared to the autonomists within the MPA, who held the majority. Nationalists, rallying around Jo Peraldi, declared a split within the MPA on 4 March and withdrew from the group. Peraldi and his supporters created Corsica Viva in Propriano on 24 March. This created two factions, both of which remaining within the FLNC-CA: those centred around Orsoni and the MPA, and those centred around Peraldi and Corsica Viva.

=== Creation of the FLNC-5 May and dissolution ===
After deliberation, the FLNC-CA announced on 5 May 1996, the 20th anniversary of the FLNC's foundation, their intent to disarm completely in order to pursue a political solution to the conflict and to prevent more deaths in the feud with the Historiques. At the exact same time as this conference, Habituels against disarmament, many of whom were members of the Corsica Viva party, carry out a spontaneous series of bomb attacks in Ajaccio before holding their own press conference in the nearby mountains, calling themselves the "FLNC of 5 May". They declare their intention to "occupy the field" of armed struggle "left vacant" by the FLNC-CA. "Maghjini" (members of the FLNC-5 May) began to carry out large-scale campaigns against the FLNC-CS as well as the French government.

Immediately following the FLNC-5 May's press conference and numerous threats from Historiques, Alain Orsoni silently fled to Miami, Florida without informing anybody within the MPA. This forced the party to hastily reconvene under the direction of moderate autonomist Dominique Bianchi who campaigned for peace and pressured a rapid dissolution of the FLNC-CA. Disarming finished in early 1997, and the group officially dissolved on 29 January 1997.

== Structure ==
The FLNC-Canal Habituel, much like the original FLNC and the FLNC-Canal Historique, was organised into geographically defined brigades, each led by a specific leader. Unlike the other two organisations, however, the FLNC-CA was much looser and did not have a proper hierarchal structure. Instead, most of the group's decision-making was done directly through Alain Orsoni's leadership.

Ghjuventù Paolina (GP), a student union operating in Corsican high schools and within the University of Corsica, fell under the direct influence of the FLNC-CA in the mid-1990s, although for much of its early years it was associated with Resistenza and the Corsican National Alliance. Following the creation of Corsica Viva, GP's secretary, Jean-Félix Acquaviva, defected to the FLNC-5 May's sphere of influence for a time before becoming an independent moderate autonomist.

The Movement for Self-Determination was the political wing of the FLNC-CA. Many decisions made by the MPA were made by or alongside the FLNC-CA.

== Ideology and demands ==
The FLNC-Canal Habituel, unlike its rival, the FLNC-Canal Historique (a Marxist organisation), had no specific ideological platform. The group's demands were largely on par with the original FLNC's moderate faction, that being a big tent coalition of Corsican autonomists and nationalists working to secure both autonomy and eventual independence from France. Femu a Corsica, a modern political party, works a similar way.

The FLNC-CA denounced independence without gradual reforms in 1992. The group disavowed the Marxist formation of the FLNC-CS and claimed to support liberalism, both economic and social, as well as the expansion of local businesses. The FLNC-CA also supported European federalism with Corsica as a member.
