= National Liberation Front of Corsica (1976–1990) =

Nationalist paramilitary organization

- Fronte di Liberazione Naziunale di a Corsica
- Leaders: Direzione (1976-1979); Cunsigliu and Ghjunta (1979-1988); National Congress (1988-1990)
- Founded: 5 May 1976
- Dissolved: 17 October 1990
- Merger of: Corsican Peasant Front for Liberation (Corsica) Ghjustizia Paolina
- Split to: Resistenza; FLNC-Canal Historique; FLNC-Canal Habituel
- Ideology: Corsican Nationalism; Marxism-Leninism
- Political position: Far-left
- Wars: Corsican conflict

The National Liberation Front of Corsica (Corsican: Fronte di Liberazione Naziunale di a Corsica, abbreviated FLNC), informally known as “the front” (Corsican: u fronte) was a Corsican nationalist guerrilla and paramilitary organization formed on 5 May 1976. The group formed to violently overthrow French rule in Corsica to establish an independent Corsican state. It was the first group to form during the Corsican conflict, and the first to use the name “National Liberation Front of Corsica”. The group was declared an unlawful organization in 1983 and ordered to dissolve, but continued to operate regardless of the ruling.

The FLNC engaged the French in a guerrilla war in Corsica throughout its existence, defining the early period of the Corsican conflict. FLNC attacks were primarily in Corsica, but attacks on the French mainland were also common, mostly along the French Riviera and in Paris. The FLNC was allied with many other separatist armed organizations in Europe, as well as Palestinian militant groups. The FLNC declared a ceasefire twice during its existence: Once in 1981 for the Defferre agreements, and once in May 1988 to open dialogue with the recently re-elected Mitterand government. The latter ceasefire was extremely controversial, and led to the implosion of the group and the creation of Resistenza, the FLNC-Canal Habituel, and the FLNC-Canal Historique.

== History ==
=== Origins ===
Corsicans have, for most of their history under French rule, felt alienated from the French mainland due to geography, language, and customs. From the introduction of French rule, Corsican government institutions had largely been run by small, local families of politicians called “clans”. The early French governments tolerated the clans, preferring to leave Corsica’s governance to the Corsicans. French officials in Corsica like the prefect were sidelined on the island, and the goal of the prefect was to stay out of Corsican politics most of the time, only providing insight or guidelines to the French government in Paris. Under Napoleon III, The French cabinet had begun a policy of appointing a Corsican deputy minister, and for most of the French Third Republic that minister was Emmanuel Arène. Known to the locals as “u re Manuele” (the king Emmanuel), who attempted to create a system of clanism where Corsican politicians would be more open to French authority. Regardless of his attempt, real power in Corsica remained with the local Conseil Général and the mayors, who often acted in their own interests and were hostile, sometimes even physically violent, to French authorities such as the prefect and the deputies.

By the 1900s, Corsica was slowly being brought into the sphere of metropolitan France. Large migrations, industrialization, and government subsidies allowed short-term economic growth in Corsica, causing many locals to adopt pro-French sentiment, not due to a shared national identity, but rather due to the economic growth from being a French territory. This was strengthened by the tragedy of World War I, which allowed Corsica and mainland France to share a sense of solidarity and pride due to the men from Corsica who fought in the war. After the war, many Corsicans became worried over the growing threat of Mussolini’s Italian Irredentism, as Corsica was included in the claims of many Italian irredentists. In December 1938, Violent protests broke out across the island between Italian irredentists and pro-French Corsicans. In Bastia, tens of thousands of Corsicans met and swore the now infamous Oath of Bastia, where they declared: “Before the world, with all our soul, on our glories, on our graves, on our cradles, we swear to live and die French”. After the outbreak of World War II, many Corsicans saw the war with Germany on the mainland as mostly irrelevant, fearing a possible Italian invasion more than a German one. Many Corsicans, despite the wish to remain French, largely still didn’t feel a national connection to mainland France due to a separate linguistic, historical, and cultural identity. Upon the fall of France in 1940, the new Vichy government made defending Corsica from the Italian threat a priority. Despite the insistence of French unity by Corsican citizens, many were only supportive of a French government to reject Italian sovereignty. Corsican prefect Paul Balley stated: “a Corsican who claims to be French is demonstrating not so much loyalty to France as rejection of Italy”.

In November 1942, German and Italian soldiers violently dismantled Vichy France, and Corsica came under Italian administration. A widespread Corsican resistance movement soon popped up, led mostly locally until the introduction of the National Front to the island. General Charles de Gaulle sent Corsican Fred Scamaroni to unify the maquis under his leadership, but he was captured by Italian police and tortured until he committed suicide on 19 March 1943. After the fall of Mussolini, many Italian soldiers joined the Corsican resistance and drove the Germans out of Corsica along with an allied invasion force. The invasion of Italy and the Corsican National Front being largely local and separate from the mainland one caused many Corsicans to redefine their relationship with France. By January 1943, reports began to reach Laval that support for a French government in Corsica had “drained away”. Corsica was the first department of France to be liberated, yet the French government maintained that Calvados was the first, demonstrating to many Corsicans the supposed indifference of the French towards Corsica.

Corsicans under the Fourth Republic were largely supportive of Charles de Gaulle, seeking economic interests from him. During the Algerian War and other colonial conflicts of the 1960s, Corsicans were drafted heavily, making up 22 percent of French colonial forces despite only being around 1% of all French citizens. This was done to bind Corsica to France through military service, though it also created a small sense of disdain amongst Corsicans. “Operation Corse”, an invasion of Corsica by soldiers attempting to reinstate de Gaulle into power, was supported by many Corsicans, and resistance to the landings were next to none. Despite this, de Gaulle’s administration during the Fifth Republic caused relations between Corsicans and France to sour greatly. De Gaulle’s opposition to regionalism and the establishment of a “strong state” caused Corsicans, who had been enjoyed Corsican self-government for the longest time, to feel betrayed by de Gaulle. funding for regional projects in Corsica dried up, and Corsicans felt that Corsica had become an oversight to the government in Paris. Policies of de Gaulle’s government led directly to the founding of the Muvimentu di 29 Nuvembri (November 29 Movement, M29N) in Ajaccio and Bastia on 4 October 1959.

The M29N was the first militant base of Corsican separatism. It was founded by Corsican communists who were sympathetic to the Algerian National Liberation Front (Front de Libération National, FLN) and led by Achille de Susini, who had spent many years rallying support for the FLN amongst Corsican separatists. It gained traction quickly due to many Corsican separatists feeling connected to Algerian colonial struggle as a “colonized peoples”.

The M29N led a small armed campaign which ballooned into the first insurgency in Corsica, in which various groups formed to combat French rule in Corsica. The three most important groups to form during this conflict were the Corsican Regionalist Action (Azione Regiunalista Corsa, ARC), later renamed to the Action for Corsican Rebirth (Azione per a Rinascita Corsa, ARC) in 1975 and renamed again to the Association of Corsican Patriots (Associu di i Patriotti Corsi, APC) in 1976, the Corsican Peasant Front for Liberation (Fronte Paesanu Corsu per Liberazione, FPCL), a Marxist formation, and Paolina Justice (Ghjustizia Paolina, GP).

The ARC formed in 1967 after leaving another group, the Corsican Regionalist Front (Fronte Regiunalista Corsa, FRC). They are most famous for the 1975 Aleria standoff, where a large number of ARC militants stormed a wine cellar in the town of Aleria owned by pied-noir settlers who had recently left Algeria after it gained independence.

The FPCL formed in 1973 out of a series of radical committees formed during the red mud affair, an affair in which Italian shipping company Montedison was dumping oil into the Ligurian Sea, causing the oil to float to Corsican shores and pollute the environment. This led to a very early form of environmental activism in which large committees formed in many major cities to organize against the actions of Montedison. This affair caused the Corsicans, many of whom already felt neglected by the government, to feel even more betrayed as the French government did nothing to address the pollution on the island. Thus, many turned to Corsican nationalism, leading to the proper establishment of the FPCL that year. On 15 September 1973, the FPCL bombed a Montedison ship docked in the Tuscan town of Follonica, beginning an armed campaign initially focused on the red mud affair, but soon the focus shifted to a proper liberation of Corsica from French colonialism.

The GP formed in 1974, beginning a series of actions in armed actions in Bastia in March of that year. The declared objectives of the GP were vague, however they were vaguely separatist. In the 1975 “Pentecost Manifesto” published by the GP and the FPCL, GP officials are especially critical of Edmond Simeoni’s on-and-off militarism as leader of the ARC. This sparked criticism of Simeoni within the ARC itself, with ARC member and future FLNC leader Pierre Poggioli stating: “Choose the fishing rod or the rifle, Edmond!”

After the August 1975 Aleria standoff, the French authorities strengthened their attempts to delegitimize and crack down on the growing nationalist movement. This caused nationalists to strengthen their campaigns as a response, and the FPCL and GP had begun a joint armed campaign by the end of 1975. To avoid being shut down by police, the ARC became the Association of Corsican Patriots (Associu di i Patriotti Corsi) in early 1976. However, many militants, notably Serge Cacciari, had already been arrested and were facing court charges due to be heard on 5 May 1976.

On 5 May 1976, the FPCL and GP met, along with many ARC dissidents, in a conference held in Saint-Antoine de Casabianca, a church where Pasquale Paoli declared the Corsican Republic’s existence in 1755. There, they merged the two organizations and formed the National Liberation Front of Corsica (Fronte di Liberazione Naziunale di a Corsica, FLNC).

=== Foundation ===
The FLNC detailed the formal separation from the autonomist movement at Casabianca, declaring the movement to be supporting “neo-colonialism”, stating that institutions of an autonomous Corsica will be French in all but name. The FLNC also takes a stance against the overconscription of Corsicans in the French army, claiming the French state is “using [the Corsicans] as cannon fodder”. They also denounce any collaboration with the French Communist Party, claiming the party to have betrayed Marxist principles and “serving the interests of the colonialist state”. Many of the subjects discussed at this meeting were published a year later into the manifesto “a libertà o a morte” (“Liberty or Death”). Many dissidents from the APC joined the creation of the FLNC as well, notably Alain Orsoni, Pierre Poggioli, and Jean-Guy Talamoni, though the latter has denied any involvement within the FLNC.

During and after the meeting, a series of 21 bomb attacks occurred throughout Corsica. In Ajaccio (4 attacks), Bastia (2 attacks), Corte (3 attacks), Francardo (1 attack), Ghisonaccia (3 attacks), Porto-Vecchio (2 attacks), Sartène (1 attack), Linguizzetta (1 attack), Biguglia (1 attack), and Calenzana (1 attack), large bomb attacks were all carried out. Marseille (1 attack) and Nice (1 attack) on the french mainland also suffered bomb attacks. An anonymous correspondent called into a Corse-Matin agency, and subsequently delivered a press release to be printed into the newspaper the next morning.

A manifesto appeared that morning as well, found printed on leaflets and put into mailboxes, thrown onto streets, taped or stapled onto walls, and in many other places. This manifesto, named the “Manifesto of 5 May” detailed the goals and principles of the FLNC and encouraged all corsican patriots to join the organization.

CORSICAN PEOPLE:

A Decisive step in the national liberation struggle of our people has been taken. The nationalists have decided to unite by forming the National Liberation Front, the final step in more than ten years of struggle.

For many years now, the French state has been attempting a final, murderous operation: To make our people disappear completely and replace them with a foreign population, repeating point by point the spiteful Genoese policy.

Faced with this threat of death, We cannot remain with our armed crossed. This is why we address all Corsicans for national liberation. Every patriot must be a soldier in the national liberation struggle determined to defeat the enemy.

— National Liberation Front of Corsica, Excerpt from the Manifesto of 5 May

These demands all concluded the removal of the French state, which they refer to as “oppressive” and “colonialist”, and replacement of it with a democratic Corsican republic with marxist ideals would be the most beneficial option for the Corsican people.

=== Early campaign ===
The FLNC began a large-scale armed campaign after announcing their existence, officially kickstarting the Corsican conflict. These attacks typically targeted government agencies, though attacks on French nationals they declared to be “settlers” also occurred, though with less frequency.

A large wave of public support to the FLNC came on 24 September 1976, when soldiers of the French Foreign Legion shot and killed two Corsican shepherds in the town of Bustanico. This caused residents of the nearby larger town of Corte to engage in mass uprising which would soon become the first of many urban guerrilla theatres in the Corsican conflict. The FLNC began activities in the town soon after protests began, bombing the home of the foreign legion colonel in the Corte area on the same day as the bodies in Bustanico were found.

That day, on 26 September, barricades were placed around Corte, and access to the town became limited. A French army general sent to Corte narrowly missed an assassination when FLNC gunmen shot at his car, wounding his driver. On 28 October, after three days of protests and fighting, the mayor of Corte announced he would negotiate to remove the Foreign Legion from the city. The Foreign Legion was ordered to leave by the town on 1 October and left ten days later.

One of the most important early attacks by the FLNC occurred on 26 March 1977, when an FLNC commando raided the Fort Lacroix in Bastia. A group commanded by Antone Mattei broke into the complex, stealing weapons and ammunition before laying explosives in the area. Before they went off, the FLNC took the effort to evacuate everybody inside on a policy of a bloodless action. Everybody was rallied outside before detonating the explosives, destroying a significant portion of the building.

The growing influence and strength of the FLNC created a sense of unease in many French communities, most of whom were recent pied-noir arrivals from Algeria. Thus, many gathered around French colonel Pierre Bertolini, a Franco-Italian in charge of Foreign Legion actions in northern Corsica, and created the New Action Front Against Independence and Autonomy (Front d’Action Nouvelle Contre l’Indépendance et l’Autonomie, FRANCIA) on 6 April 1977. FRANCIA is often described as a “death squad” due to its extensive connections with the French military, with the French military even coordinating many of its attacks. Almost immediately, the FLNC and FRANCIA engaged in an armed conflict parallel to the one with the French government.

With the strengthening of armed conflict, the FLNC began to carry out smaller attacks on the French mainland. A large attack in Grenoble completely destroyed the labour exchange in the city.

In August 1977, the FLNC attacked the Serra di Pigno transmitter, bombing it so heavily that most of northern Corsica lost access to most television channels for 18 months. What followed immediately after the bombing was a small-scale siege of the area, though no military action on either side caused any casualties. The attack was claimed shortly after, along with 6 other bomb attacks that occurred around the same time. FLNC officials claimed the attack, along with the March 1977 Fort Lacroix raid, was done as a show of force fo French officials, who up until then had largely disregarded the FLNC’s capabilities as a guerrilla force. The attack was also done to draw attention to the speech of Edmond Simeoni in Furiani, who had recently been released from prison. This caused a change of strategy from the French police and military, resorting to a harshly criticized policy of trying to weed out FLNC leaders by arresting various Corsican activists, many of whom had nothing to do with the FLNC. This policy would continue throughout the Corsican conflict, and while it would occasionally result in the arrest of FLNC members or leaders, in many cases the arrested members were innocent of what they had been accused of.

Shortly after the Serra-di-Pigno attack, the FLNC organized a press conference in the occupied area around San-Martino-di-Lota where they discussed key ideas of their campaign, releasing the “green book”, a small handbook detailing the FLNC’s key ideological goals and points.

On 14 January 1978, the FLNC brought further attention to their campaign with a major attack against a symbol of French authority on the island: the Solenzara air base. In an attack called “Operation Zara”, FLNC soldiers entered the air base disguised as delivery drivers, planting bombs in the main area as well as around various radar stations, destroying all but one, where a bomb did not go off.

Tensions reached a peak in 1979 and 1980 when various arrests seriously threatened the internal organization of the FLNC. In Paris, during the trial of 21 suspected FLNC members on 14 June 1979, the FLNC held a press conference, announcing a hardening of armed struggle as well as claiming 22 bomb attacks that had occurred in Paris on 31 May. 15 more attacks in Paris followed on 15 June. On 20 June, the accused members, known as the “twenty-one of Paris” (Corsican: Vintunu di Pariggi) issued a statement in court read by Mathieu Filidori, himself an accused member. In the 90 minute speech, Filidori urged the French government to negotiate with the FLNC as representatives of the Corsican people and outlined the reasons for armed struggle. At the end of the trial, the twenty-one stood together and sang the Corsican national anthem, Dio vi salvi Regina.

On 25 October 1979, more attacks in Paris occurred, including the bombing of an army outpost in La Courneuve.

On 6 January 1980, the “Battle of Bastelica-Fesch” occurred, a major turning point of the Corsican conflict. Three FRANCIA members, commanded by FRANCIA leader and French army commander Pierre Bertolini, entered the town of Bastelica in an attempt to assassinate UPC leader Marcel Lorenzoni. Lorenzoni was made aware of this in advance, and alerted his party. The FLNC quickly established a column called the “Bastelica Nationalist Collective”, and “imprisoned” the FRANCIA members. Some members of the collective transported them to the Fesch hotel in Ajaccio, while others stayed behind and fought with the incoming police forces. After six days, the FLNC surrendered the hotel and were driven out of Bastelica.

After Bastelica, the FLNC issued the “white paper”, in which it harkened back to the speech delivered in court by Mathieu Filidori, claiming to represent the Corsican people and calling for legitimacy and negotiations with the French government.

On 14 May 1980, an FLNC commando led by then Paris brigade leader Alain Orsoni committed an attack targeting gendarmes guarding the Iranian embassy, causing four injuries. This led to Orsoni’s arrest 3 months later.

On 14 January 1981, the trial for militants involved in the Bastelica-Fesch affair begins. In Ajaccio, a crowd of 15,000 people gather in support of the FLNC. The verdict is handed down a month later, giving harsh sentences for everyone involved on the side of the FLNC. In response, the FLNC committed 49 attacks across Corsica as a show of force.

=== Defferre accords ===
On 3 April 1981, presidential candidate François Mitterand visited Corsica, where he announced his support for Corsican autonomy and a peaceful agreement with the FLNC. After the FLNC’s two governing bodies, the cunsigliu and the ghjunta, held a vote on 1 April, the FLNC announced an unlimited truce to support Mitterand’s campaign on the same day as his visit. The oncoming agreements did not sit well with many FLNC officials, notably François Santoni, commander of the Gravona brigade, who held a disdain for French officials. Upon the arrival of Valéry Giscard d’Estaing to Ajaccio, Santoni ordered Gravona brigade members to plant a bomb in the Ajaccio airport to Assassinate Giscard. The bomb, however, did not injure Giscard, though it injured 8 tourists and killed 1. This was denounced by the FLNC central committee, and the plan for negotiations continued regardless.

Mitterand’s victory in the 1981 election allowed for negotiations to formally begin. Mitterand and his defense minister Gaston Defferre led the negotiations for the French side, and almost immediately began work to compromise on a number of issues important to the FLNC.

Amnesty was at first not discussed, but it shot up to the top of the priority list when, in June 1981, the large population of Corsican political prisoners imprisoned in Fleury-Mérogis Prison began a prison revolt. They demanded the release of two notable inmates: Alain Orsoni, future leader of the FLNC-Canal Habituel who at the time led the Paris brigade of the FLNC, and Serge Cacciari, a former ARC militant arrested for the murder of a gendarme during the Aleria standoff. The revolt ended quickly, but its effects were lasting, as it made amnesty for FLNC prisoners a major discussion. Cacciari was released on 22 July 1981, and Orsoni was released on 2 March 1982. Both were released alongside a large number of other FLNC prisoners. In October 1981, one of the FLNC’s major demands were met: the reopening of the University of Corsica, closed since the arrival of French troops since 1768. A university council was established on 23 October, and on 26 October the university officially reopened.

A major point of contention in the agreements revolved around the stationing of the Foreign Legion across Corsica. Defferre had removed the Foreign Legion’s command centre from Bonifacio, but stationing of Legion troops remained. One brigade leader of the FLNC, Charles Pieri, was outspoken regarding his hatred of the Foreign Legion. Pieri, like Santoni, was a harsh critic of the ceasefire, and had attempted to defy it. On 11 February 1982, Pieri led a group of FLNC soldiers to a Foreign Legion outpost in the town of Sorbo-Ocognano, where they attack the building before shooting two members stationed at the outpost. One member, Renato Rossi, an Italian immigrant, was killed. This caused a large amount of outrage, eventually leading to Pieri’s arrest on 24 March. This caused a fallout between the FLNC and the government, marking the end of the truce. The Defferre process would continue, with the National Assembly ratifying a law to officially create the Corsican Assembly, a local legislative body in Corsica (something the FLNC had long demanded) in July, with the first elections being held in August. The FLNC reaffirmed the end of the truce with a large-scale attack called the “violent blue night”, in which 99 bomb attacks occurred nearly simultaneously across Corsica.

=== Peak of activity ===
On 5 January 1983, the French government declared the dissolution of the FLNC. This meant nothing in practice, as the FLNC continued their activities regardless of the ruling.

On 17 June 1983, Guy Orsoni, brigade leader for Porto-Vecchio and brother of Alain Orsoni, was kidnapped by members of the Valinco mafia with alleged French support. This caused a wave of protests in Corsica as well as a mobilization of the FLNC to destroy the Valinco mafia. Felix Rosso, a major member of Valinco, was shot and killed by an FLNC commando on 10 September. By the end of 1983, Valinco had been under sharp decline, and their leader, Jean-Marc Leccia, was arrested in Miami, Florida by American police.

The FLNC gradually increased its influence outside of military struggle. In October 1983, the Corsican Movement for Self-Determination (Muvimentu Corsu per l’Autodeterminazione, MCA) was created. The MCA was a political party made to "broaden the front" of Corsican nationalism to include the recently created Corsican Assembly. Pierre Poggioli was the MCA president, and Léo Battesti was his general secretary. On 1 January 1984, the Corsican Workers’ Trade Union (Sindicatu di i Travagliadori Corsi, STC) was formed as a labour extension of the FLNC. This allowed the FLNC to involve itself in the labour struggle as well as the political struggle.

Throughout 1983 and 1984, a large number of FLNC members and Corsican nationalist activists were arrested, though by this time the FLNC had enough popular support to recruit people to fill in lost positions. However, a major loss came on 9 January 1984 when Stefanu Cardi, brigade leader in the south, was killed in Coti-Chiavari by a bomb which detonated prematurely. A series of commemorations were held, some of which resulted in clashes with French authorities.

On 7 June 1984, a commando cell of three FLNC members, two of them dressed as gendarms, broke into Ajaccio prison and shot dead three members of the Valinco gang, most notably Jean-Marc Leccia, who had recently been extradited from the United States. This was done as revenge for the kidnapping of Guy Orsoni, of which the first anniversary was nearing. After the attack, the activists surrendered themselves to police who had surrounded the prison. The resulting arrests also unraveled alliance negotiations between the FLNC and the Palestinian organization Fatah, as one of the commando members led said negotiations.

On 1 December 1984, large marches are organized around Corsica to protest the treatment of Corsican prisoners and demand the status of political prisoner. The FLNC coupled this with a series of st least 10 bomb attacks targeting government institutions.

Also in December 1984, French patrol missions begin in the north of the island, mostly around Bastia. On 2 December, a patrol group in the Fango valley is the target of an FLNC attack, killing one and injuring three.

On 14 January 1985, the FLNC sent a message of solidarity to the Kanak and Socialist National Liberation Front after the murder of Éloi Machoro, an FLNKS militant shot by French gendarmes and left to bleed out.

On 24 January 1985, the FLNC enters conflict with the successors of FRANCIA, Corse Française Républicaine (CFR). CFR militants storm the grounds of the University of Corsica, armed to the teeth. In response, the FLNC began to engage CFR members in armed conflict at the university grounds, as well as assassinating their leader, Jean Depuy. By February, the conflict had ended and the CFR had disbanded.

On 17 February 1985, the FLNC committed a bomb attack with dynamite targeting the Grossetti barracks in Ajaccio. This caused defense minister Charles Hernu to issue further deployment to Corsica to deal with the FLNC, similar to the British deployment to Northern Ireland during the troubles.

In March 1985, Cantonal elections were held in Corsica. During the election, nearly 500 letters from the FLNC urging the French population of Ajaccio to not vote were intercepted.

On 1 April 1985, a delegation of FLNC representatives visited Puerto Rico, where they connected with the Corsican diaspora on the island, holding information meetings and accepting donations for support. The same group met with the Corsican diaspora in Venezuela.

In May 1985, Felice Tomasi, an FLNC militant who participated in Charles Pieri’s Sorbo-Ocognano attack, is tried for terrorism and imprisoned. Later in 1992, The French government is found guilty of prison torture by the European Court of Human Rights regarding Tomasi’s incarceration.

On 16 July 1985, Members of the FLNC commando involved in the Ajaccio prison attack are all sentenced to heavy amounts of prison time. The commando leader, Pierre Albertini, issued a statement in court detailing the Corsican national liberation struggle.

On 31 August 1985, the FLNC begins a campaign targeting tourist infrastructure, a campaign they will continue for the rest of their existence. Tour buses, hotels, hostels, and other symbols of tourism would be targeted.

On 20 September 1985, the FLNC broke into the Radio Corsica Frequenza Mora (RCFM) radio station in Bastia, broadcasting a message in Corsican urging more locals to join the FLNC. This would later result in arrests, but it also contributed to the surge of FLNC membership in the 1980s.

By the end of 1985, the Valinco gang had essentially dissolved, though in early 1986 an FLNC spy ring in Miami had discovered that Henri Rossi, a higher-up of Valinco, had fled to the city. Rossi would flee to Switzerland before being extradited back to France in January 1986.

In early 1986, the FLNC and its political wing, the MCA, begin campaigning for the elections. Many nationalists in the FLNC, notably a faction Maoists who do not believe in electoralism, abstain from the regional elections. The MCA wins three seats, and their ally, the UPC, wins three as well. These results would come under scrutiny, as the Corsican branches of the Socialist Party and the Radical Movement of the Left are implicated for fraud. Reelections are scheduled for 1987. However, on 17 January 1987, before the vote, a bomb went off at the MCA headquarters in Bastia. The FLNC blames French police, who had a history of undercover operations against nationalists. The MCA tells Corsican nationalists to “be vigilant”, which results in the police dissolving the organization before the elections on the account of “support of terrorism”. Shortly after, the FLNC organizes “cuncolte” in various towns in Corsica, notably Corte. This would result in the formation of A Cuncolta Naziunalista (ACN), the new political wing of the FLNC, on 28 June 1987. The former members of the MCA are grouped into ACN, and the three elected officials maintain their seats in the new election.

On 15 November 1987, Ghjuvan’Battista Acquaviva, an FLNC brigade leader, is shot dead by French police. This begins a process of mourning similar to the one after the death of Stefanu Cardi in 1984. Several thousand people attend his funeral in L’Île Rousse. On 19 December, the FLNC bombed the home of Colon Roussel, the gendarme who shot Acquaviva.

On 22 April 1988, the FLNC places a carbomb on the main road outside of Ajaccio airport. The bomb was remotely detonated as a gendarme car drove past it. 5 gendarmes were wounded, one seriously. This was followed by a press release demanding the release of FLNC prisoners. This was one of the many factors leading to the 1988 ceasefire and renewal of negotiations.

=== Dissident Campaign ===
On 31 May 1988, after the reelection of François Mitterrand, the FLNC declared another ceasefire, urging negotiations. Many members of the FLNC’s congress disagreed with this action, and began to speak out against the decision. These members rallied around hyper-militarist figures within the FLNC such as François Santoni, who had disrespected ceasefire agreements before during the Defferre agreements.

Despite the growing internal conflict within the FLNC, members of the group issued a motion to the Corsican assembly defining a “Corsican people” and established various social and economic projects to encourage Corsican identity. This was the first part of government negotiations between the FLNC and the state, and this paved the way for various other agreements, including amnesty.

By 1989, tensions in Corsica were beginning to boil. In March, civil servants began a strike over the high cost of living on the island. This lasts until late April. At the same time, the FLNC began to implode as brigade leaders withdrew from the congress, creating independent brigades. One of these brigades attempts to take the prefect of the island hostage on 18 April 1989, but fails. A dissident leader in Ajaccio was shot dead by two armed men from the FLNC. What followed was a race between what remained of the FLNC and the dissidents for arms, occupied territory, and influence.

Despite the conflict, negotiations continue in Paris which result in amnesty for all Corsican political prisoners by August 1989. This only causes divisions to deepen as the released prisoners are forced to choose a side. By the next month, congress leader Pierre Poggioli resigns. Bombings pick up after this, with the dissidents, known as the “historiques”, bombing French government buildings and real-estate projects, and both sides bombing political symbols of the other side. A Cuncolta Naziunalista is taken under the influence of the dissidents, with its leader Alain Orsoni being replaced by François Santoni and Charles Pieri.

In January 1990, the last agreements with the government were voted on and passed. Pierre Joxe, the new interior minister under Mitterrand, “scolded” the dissidents, and proposed plans for the development of the town of Corte, Corsican language rights, and tourism.

In September 1990, a third faction appears, the Corsican National Liberation Army (Armata di Liberazione Naziunale di a Corsica, ALNC). The ALNC would only exist for a month before being reattached to the FLNC on 7 October 1990. During its existence, they mainly bombed tourist camps, committing a total of 12 claimed attacks. On 6 October 1990, a fourth and much larger faction appeared called Resistenza. Resistenza was formed as an armed wing for the Corsican National Alliance, a political party founded by former FLNC leader Pierre Poggioli.

On 17 October 1990, the FLNC officially became the FLNC-Canal Habituel (Canale Abituale, FLNC-CA) after Alain Orsoni dissolved the congress and created his own political wing, the Movement for Self-Determination (Muvimentu per l’Autodeterminazione, MPA). The dissident brigades would unite on 25 November 1990, invading the town of Borgo and proclaiming the creation of the FLNC-Canal Historique (Canale Storicu, FLNC-CS).

== Structure ==
The FLNC has had various organizational changes throughout its existence, though for most of its existence it employed an idea very similar to the IRA’s army council, though it was reorganized and reworked many times.

=== 1976–1979: The direzione ===
During the FLNC’s founding conference, they created their first proper governing body: the “direzione”. The direzione was a sort of congress, made up of elected representatives from 8 regions: Ajaccio, Balagne, Bastia, Casinca, Corte-Niolo, Fiumorbo, Porto-Vecchio, and mainland France. These were led by “nodi”, who also appointed military officers for brigades, of which each section had two to seven.

This system allowed for elections within the group, assuring popular support within the group’s leadership. Many actions taken by the group were voted on, including the April 1979 Paris bombings, a large series of attacks on Parisian banks and government buildings done as a response to the arrest of 25 members, including multiple nodi, along with perhaps the most influential one, Léo Battesti.

This 1979 attack and the 1978 arrests which preceded it led to the eventual reform and creation of a new system. Due to the arrests, the northern regions of Capocorso, Bastia, and Casinca were almost entirely cut off from the rest of the FLNC as police investigations severely hindered their ability to operate. The nodu from Ajaccio, Pierre Poggioli, fled to the FLNC-controlled maquis. These arrests, which were followed by even more, led to FLNC membership to skyrocket as the CRS and GIGN began to arrest almost everybody, including minors, who opposed French authority in Corsica. This caused many to feel a sense of oppression by the state, thus flocking to the FLNC. The FLNC took advantage of this by issuing large-scale recruitment operations to replace the lost members. These new recruits, along with the direzione, who finally met in the summer of 1979, created a new structure within the FLNC.

=== 1979–1988: The cunsigliu-ghjunta ===
The new structure expanded the group to feature two separate branches: the Cunsigliu (council), composed of elected representatives from each region forming a political action branch of the FLNC, and the Ghjunta (junta), composed of elected officers from each brigade responsible for armed actions and coordination. The Cunsigliu held meetings every month, and often sent representatives to meet with the Ghjunta to discuss strategy and campaign.

This strategy of two branches caused a significant issue with factionalism, and constant debates over tactics and strategy plagued both branches of the FLNC, causing little action at the beginning of its implementation. However, by the end of 1982, more frequent meetings allowed for greater cooperation and armed actions quickly escalated further.

1983 marked a major division between the cunsigliu and the ghjunta. The cunsigliu had passed a vote to create a “revolutionary tax” system wherein money would be taken from wealthy French settlers by soldiers and then would be given to the central committee of the FLNC, made up of the cunsigliu and the ghjunta, where the money would be distributed evenly amongst all of the constituent organizations. Many members protested this, both because many regarded it as inhumane, and also because it had the potential to cause corruption. Many brigades, notably in urban areas such as the Gravona brigade in eastern Ajaccio and the brigades of the Bastia suburbs began taking money from Frenchmen but pocketing it and not sending it to the central committee to distribute. This was exposed by the Schock affair, in which a French barber was robbed and assassinated in Ajaccio by Gravona brigade members attempting to extort him. The money from this action was not given to the central committee, but due to the organization of the FLNC, there was no way to punish the brigade responsible for the action. This lack of punishment would create the conditions that would eventually lead to the dissident campaign in 1988. The revolutionary tax system shed light on the largest internal issue within the FLNC, that of centralization and the autonomy, financial and political, of the individual brigades within their own regions and the organization as a whole.

=== 1988–1990: National Congress ===
After the Schock affair, the distance between the consigliu and the ghjunta gradually worsened, and by 1987 they had begun to refuse cooperation. The cunsigliu, headed at this time by cunsigliu president Pierre Poggioli, began organizing a joint congress to hash out issues between the brigade leaders in the ghjunta and deputies in the cunsigliu. Instrumental in this process was Alain Orsoni, who was both a cunsigliu member representing Ajaccio region and a ghjunta member, being brigade leader of the inner Ajaccio brigade. Thus, the responsibility of organizing and securing the congress was left to the Ajaccio region. The first congress was held in the Gravona area of Ajaccio region and dealt with the controversial issue of centralization and autonomy. Gravona was likely chosen due to the Gravona brigade leader, François Santoni, being an ardent autonomist who had disobeyed central committee orders many times, most notably when he ordered his brigade to carry out the attempted assassination of Valéry Giscard d’Estaing in 1981.

The new congress system temporarily healed the divisions within the FLNC, allowing for a brief period of negotiations. This, however, would change rapidly. With the re-election of François Mitterand in 1988, the FLNC declared a ceasefire to discuss the status of Corsica with the new interior minister Pierre Joxe. This reopened the struggle between the cunsigliu and the ghjunta, as numerous brigade leaders began to denounce the ceasefire. Poggioli, however, decided to distance himself from violence entirely, founding a political party, the Corsican National Alliance. However, despite Poggioli’s distancing from violent separatism, the ANC would eventually create a paramilitary wing, Resistenza.

Poggioli’s departure left Alain Orsoni in charge, which immediately put several autonomists off. Starting in late 1988, numerous brigade leaders withdrew from the ghjunta and left the FLNC entirely, beginning a dissident campaign that would turn into a full-scale civil war in 1990. Orsoni was removed from power in the FLNC’s political wing, A Cuncolta Naziunalista, and replaced with François Santoni, who had withdrawn the Gravona brigade. This gave political power to the dissidents, leaving Orsoni to create the Movement for Self-Determination (Muvimentu per l’Autodeterminazione, MPA) in 1990. By October 1990, the FLNC’s central committee had been dissolved, and Orsoni’s supporters had created a new FLNC, the FLNC-Canal Habituel. The dissidents would unite in a new founding congress a month later, creating the FLNC-Canal Historique.

== Ideology and demands ==
The clearest ideology of the FLNC is that of Corsican nationalism, claiming Corsica to be a colonized nation. Some members of the FLNC were autonomists, though this was a very small faction. At the formation ceremony of the FLNC, autonomism was denounced, claiming it to be an ineffective measure to combat most of Corsica’s problems.

The FLNC officially held a Marxist-Leninist ideology, but there were many ideological factions within the FLNC, including Maoists, Trotskyists, and other variations of communist ideology. A small faction of members even adhered to right-wing ideas, though these members numbered very few.

The FLNC also held a platform of environmentalism, and many of their attacks, notably bombings of construction projects along natural sights and coastal regions and the bombing of oil tankers in Ajaccio, can be considered eco-terrorism. Somewhat related to this is the FLNC’s doctrine of “defense of the land”. This doctrine supports the idea of redistributing French-owned land to the Corsicans who work and live on it. These ideas roughly align with some policies of agrarianism, and variations of this idea are still perpetuated by successors of the original FLNC.

We have adopted the following program:

• Recognition of the national rights of the Corsican people,

• Destruction of all instruments of French colonialism (army, administration, settlers),

• Establishment of a democratic popular power, expression of all Corsican patriots,

• Implementation of agrarian reform to ensure the aspirations of peasants, workers, intellectuals and rid the country of all forms of exploitation,

• Right to self-determination after a transitional period of three years during which the administration will be equal between the nationalist force and the occupying force. This period of de-alienation will allow our people to democratically choose their destiny with or without France.

— National Liberation Front of Corsica, Manifesto of 5 May

The manifesto also detailed the actions of the French state, applying the label “colonialist” to describe these actions.

French colonialism has deprived us of:

our independence and our freedom;

it repressed our people with the greatest ferocity;

it tried to denationalize us;

it tried to erase our language and our culture by authoritarian francization;

it had nothing but contempt and racism towards us;

it economically crushed our island;

it dispersed (or rather deported) our people;

it destroyed our homes;

it used our country as a human reservoir of cannon fodder for his wars and his colonial expansion;

it sent us to act as policemen in his empire in order to stifle the national liberation movements in blood;

it tried to sow discord between Corsicans, helped in this dirty work by the clans;

it seized our lands and distributed them to French settlers and developers.

— National Liberation Front of Corsica, Manifesto of 5 May

Other demands of the FLNC include the removal of the Foreign Legion from Corsica, the establishment of a university in Corsica (this was achieved in 1982), the protection of Corsican coasts from building projects, and language rights for Corsican institutions.

== Support ==
=== Foreign support ===
The FLNC received support from numerous nations and organizations.

The FLNC engaged in numerous discussions and political exchanges with the Provisional IRA. PIRA members trained FLNC members on guerrilla warfare, and both sides sent delegations to each other for meetings and consultations.

The FLNC had a similar relationship with the Basque Euskadi ta Askatasuna, with various men, including Jean-Guy Talamoni, serving as “bridge men” between the two organizations.

Negotiations with Fatah were discovered in 1984, revealing a “bridge man” between the FLNC and Palestinian militants, including the Popular Front for the Liberation of Palestine.

In France, the FLNC garnered support from Breton separatists, forging an alliance and even collaborating on attacks with the Breton Revolutionary Army. The FLNC also enjoyed support from the Kanak and Socialist National Liberation Front, with numerous messages being sent between the two. The FLNC also collaborated with the Caribbean Revolutionary Alliance in the French West Indies and French Guiana.

The FLNC received arms and a safe haven from Czechoslovakia. Czechoslovakia also supported militant groups during the years of lead in Italy.

The FLNC also received alleged support and arms shipments from Libya. This is speculated due to the large amount of weapons that could only have realistically been supplied from the country.

The FLNC also had support from Algeria and the FLN. This was done as a sort of pressure force to gain western allies surrounding the rising tensions with Morocco, particularly over territorial disputes and algerian support for separatists in the Western Sahara. Algeria made connections with similar groups, such as the MPAIAC in the Canary Islands and the ETA in the Basque Country.

=== Internal support ===
The FLNC enjoyed a large amount of popular support from various Corsican organizations and civilians. This mostly comes from opposition to French authority, which is present in many Corsicans due to the French state’s treatment of Corsicans. This allowed the FLNC to both have legitimacy on the island, and enjoy constantly growing membership numbers.
