= Muvimentu Corsu per l'Autodeterminazione =

- President: Pierre Poggioli (1983-1986); Alain Orsoni (1986-1987)
- General Secretary: Léo Battesti
- Founded: 2 October 1983
- Dissolved: 22 January 1987
- Succeeded by: A Cuncolta Naziunalista
- Headquarters: Bastia, Haute-Corse
- Student wing: Unione di i Studenti Corsi
- Ideology: Corsican nationalism

Party flag

The Corsican Movement for Self-Determination (Corsican: Muvimentu Corsu per l'Autodeterminazione, abbreviated MCA) was a Corsican nationalist political party.

The MCA was founded in 1983 by members of the National Liberation Front of Corsica in order to participate in electoral politics on the island. Despite the popularity of the FLNC amongst Corsicans, the MCA was a very controversial party, as many Corsican separatists had adopted a policy of abstentionism and anti-electoralism, perceiving any governmental system within the French Republic as an illegitimate government which does not represent the Corsican people. Despite this, the MCA would see limited success locally and obtain three seats in the Corsican Assembly.

In January 1987, following a conflict with French police, the MCA was banned and ordered by authorities to dissolve. The group would soon after reorganize as A Cuncolta Naziunalista (The Nationalist Coalition).

== History ==
In the 1960s and 1970s, numerous small autonomist political parties existed. In 1974, many of the larger ones merged into the Partitu di u Populu Corsu per l’Autonomia (PPCA, Party of the Corsican People for Autonomy). This was the first major autonomist party in Corsica. When the National Liberation Front of Corsica formed and the Corsican conflict began, most autonomist parties, including the PPCA, denounced violence and attempted to mediate between the separatists, rallying around the FLNC, and the French government and its Corsican supporters. In 1977, the last autonomist paramilitary, the Corsican Regionalist Action (Azione Regiunalista Corsa, ARC), reorganized into a political party, the Union of the Corsican People (Unione di u Populu Corsu, UPC). This cemented the rift between the pro-peace autonomists, who participated in electoral politics, and the pro-FLNC separatists, who disavowed them. Throughout the early years of the Corsican conflict, many autonomists, disillusioned with the French government, would turn to separatism and endorse the FLNC and its violent actions.

=== Cunsulta di i Cumitati Naziunalisti ===
In March 1980, following the Bastelica-Fesch affair, a battle between the FLNC and French officials aided by a pro-French militia, local nationalist committees in Capocorso and Fium'orbo merged to form the Consulta di i Cumitati Naziunalist (CCN, Council of Nationalist Committees) to aid FLNC militants who were injured or imprisoned as a result of the events in Bastelica. The CCN became the legal front for the FLNC, maintaining its public image and organizing protests and public action.

The CCN also organized the first International Days of Corte, an international event still done today where international separatist parties for places like Northern Ireland and the Basque Country go to speak and connect with Corsican separatists.

In 1981, the FLNC went on ceasefire and began peace negotiations with the newly elected Mitterrand government. These negotiations ultimately failed, but they did result in the Defferre accords, which, among other things, created a Corsican Assembly for local government. This was the first step to a devolved government in Corsica. The FLNC, and by extension the CCN, called for nationalists to boycott the election due to the prevalence of anti-electoralism in nationalist circles. The creation of the Assembly was considered a major victory for autonomists, and many autonomist parties, including the PPCA (which had then become the Partitu Populare Corsu, PPC), and the UPC ran in the first elections of the Corsican Assembly.

On 13 September 1983, Jean-Pierre Massimi, Secretary-General under the prefect of Haute-Corse, was assassinated by the FLNC. At the time, this was the most notable government official the FLNC had been able to assassinate, and Massimi's death caused a wave of paranoia amongst Corsican authorities. As a result of this, the CCN was ordered to dissolve and some of its leaders were arrested.

=== Creation of the MCA and the 1984 election ===
Following the dissolution of the CCN, the FLNC's leadership wanted to pursue another legal front to organize public events and support. Instead of a loose organization like the CCN, FLNC cunsigliu leader Pierre Poggioli, along with other prominent cunsigliu members Alain Orsoni and Léo Battesi, began organizing a proper political party. Despite the unpopularity of electoral politics in nationalist circles, Poggioli and Battesti were convinced that creating a political party would not only replace the functions of the CCN, but also broaden the struggle to political lines in the Corsican Assembly.

The MCA was founded on 2 October 1983, with Poggioli as president and Battesti as general secretary. The MCA soon after began working with other nationalist groups to organize a political line. The Cunsulta di i Studenti Corsi (CSC, Corsican Student Council), already attached to the FLNC, became the group's official student union, working both in Corsican high schools and moreso in the recently reopened University of Corsica.

In January 1984, the MCA and FLNC began to work heavily with the recently established Sindicatu di i Travagliadori Corsi (STC, Corsican Workers' Union).

Despite the anti-electoral trend within the nationalist movement, most nationalists who were against participating in elections were not against the MCA, as the MCA was used as a legal front for more than just elections, being used for economic projects like donations and fundraisers, public events, organising protests, amongst other things.

Two years after the 1982 Corsican election, the fragile balance between the left and right in the Assembly collapsed. In June 1984, the large right-wing opposition, alongside smaller groups in the assembly, refused to pass a budget bill, resulting in snap elections being called. The MCA, hoping to counter the autonomist UPC (who had been gradually losing support in favour of the separatists, particularly the FLNC, for the past few years), announced their participation. The August 1984 election resulted in 3 seats going to the MCA under the "Unità Naziunalista" (National Unity) list, consisting of solely the MCA:

- Pierre Poggioli, president
- Dominique Gallet
- Yves Stella

The MCA's presence in the Corsican Assembly is significantly smaller than its popular support due to many nationalists abstaining from elections.

=== 1984-1986: Legal troubles and organizational expansion ===
At the end of March 1984, ten MCA members were jailed due to their participation in an FLNC military parade in L'Île-Rousse. This was the first of many police actions against the MCA as part of their broader conflict with the FLNC. On 28 March 1985, the treasurer of the MCA in the Porto-Vecchio region, along with another party member, is arrested. On 20 October that same year, the deputy general secretary, Ghjuvan'Santu Plasenzotti, is also arrested.

On 28 April 1985, the MCA created a proper system for the party. The system was bicameral, similar to the cunsigliu-ghjunta system the FLNC employed at the time. The MCA leadership was split into a "cunsulta generale" (general council), made up of members elected from each regional branch of the MCA, and a "Scagnu" (office), an executive body with 6 members.

On 11 August 1985, the MCA and UPC engage in a debate which draws a large crowd. This debate is about nationalism and autonomism. Both sides call for unity and cooperation between the two movements, with Pierre Poggioli calling for a "broadening of the struggle". In December of that year, the MPA and UPC create a joint list for the 1986 election.

Throughout early 1986, the MCA held numerous meetings (some including the UPC) throughout Corsica, as well as some in Marseille and Montpellier, both home to a large Corsican diaspora. The meetings were to gauge support and encourage electoral participation amongst nationalists. In the 1986 election, held on 16 March, 14,000 people voted for the MCA-UPC list.

Three MCA members were elected:

- Alain Orsoni, newly elected president of the MCA
- Léo Battesti, general secretary
- Pierre Poggioli

Three UPC members were also elected:

- Andria Fazi, president of the UPC
- Michel Castellani
- Max Simeoni, MCA-UPC alliance leader and brother of Edmond Simeoni

Soon after the 1986 elections, the MCA alleged that the left-wing coalition, led by the Socialist Party, had committed a large-scale voter fraud conspiracy. The party also filed a report of voter fraud to a judiciary commission, who began investigating soon after. Jean Zuccarelli, Mayor of Bastia, father of Émile Zuccarelli, and the figure responsible for reporting votes from the city, sends the votes to the council of state. The council declares soon after on 27 March they have discovered a "large-scale fraudulent enterprise" in the 1986 Corsican elections. The MPA and UPC go to Paris a month later and protest the "neglectful and slow nature" of the fraud investigations. Investigations from French authorities reveal false names, addresses, and phone numbers were submitted to multiple authorities responsible for counting votes. On 20 August, the MPA and UPC create a committee within the Corsican Assembly to investigate the fraud. Max Simeoni is elected president of this commission. François Alfonsi, a prominent UPC member, begins campaigning with the MCA to spread awareness of the widespread fraud in the elections. In the end, 20 indictments were handed down from the council of state to civil servants and public officials in Corsica, and the election was officially annulled in Haute-Corse on 16 January 1987, and a by-election was scheduled for 22 March.

=== 1987: Dismantling of the MCA ===
One day after the announcement of the annulation of the 1986 elections, the MCA headquarters in Bastia was the target of a bomb attack. The FLNC and MCA accuse two Bastia policemen as the perpetrators of this attack. The MCA, in a press release, calls on Corsicans to "be vigilant" in the wake of an alleged government attack on their headquarters. French police, accusing the party of promoting violence, order the dissolution of the MCA on 22 January 1987. The MCA refutes their argument, saying there is no legal justification for the dissolution decree. Following this, nationalist "cuncolte" (councils) are established across Corsica in protest of the dismantling, some formed with the assistance or direct participation of FLNC guerrillas. These cuncolte merge into A Cuncolta Naziunalista on 28 June 1987.

== Ideology ==
Being the political wing of the FLNC, the MCA is consistent with the ideological beliefs held by them. This includes Marxism, environmentalism, and sometimes agrarianism. The largest objective of the MCA, as with the FLNC, is Corsican separatism, the idea of Corsica achieving independence from France.

== Electoral history ==
Corsican Assembly
Election	Seats	Alliance seats
1983	3 / 61	3 / 61(UNITÀ)
1986 (annulled in Haute-Corse)	3 / 61	6 / 61(MCA-UPC)
