= Alain Orsoni =

Corsican politician (1954–2026)

- Orsoni in 2014

Leader of the FLNC-Canal Habituel
- In office 17 October 1990 – 29 January 1997

Secretary-General of A Cuncolta Naziunalista
- In office 28 June 1987 – 17 October 1990

President of the Movement for Self-Determination
- In office 17 October 1990 – 29 January 1997

Territorial Councilor of the Corsican Assembly
- In office 16 March 1986 – 22 March 1992

Personal details
- Born: 27 September 1954 Vero, Corsica, France
- Died: 12 January 2026 (aged 71) Vero, Corsica, France
- Cause of death: Assassination by gunshot
- Party: Movement for Self-Determination (MPA) (1990–1997)
- Other political affiliations: Corsican Movement for Self-Determination (MCA) (1986–1990)

Alain Orsoni (Corsican: Alanu Orsoni; 27 September 1954 – 12 January 2026) was a Corsican politician, separatist militant and football club president. Founder of the FLNC-Canal Habituel (Corsican: Canale Abituale, FLNC-CA) and its political wing, the Movement for Self-Determination (Muvimentu per l’Autodeterminazione, MPA), Orsoni led the organization until its dissolution in 1997.

Orsoni was known as the Man of Seven Lives and one of the Corsican "parrains" (a word that can be translated to "godfathers", "capi" or "mob guys") due to his criminal convictions and proclivity for creating new identities overseas to flee persecution. Orsoni was born in the town of Vero, near the city of Ajaccio. His father, a war hero from the Second World War, left when Orsoni was young to fight in Algeria, where he later joined the OAS. After a brief period as a far-right activist, Orsoni became an avid supporter of Corsican independence and moved left on the political spectrum. In 1976, a year after his participation in the Aleria standoff, he joined the newly-formed National Liberation Front of Corsica (FLNC). In 1988, Orsoni took action during the fracture of the FLNC to preserve a ceasefire signed with the French. Later, Orsoni led the FLNC-CA, and formalized peace with the French government and began a war with the other FLNC splits. After a 7-year-long war with the FLNC-Canal Historique (Canale Storicu, FLNC-CS), in which he played a major role, The Canal Habituel dissolved and Orsoni fled to Nicaragua where he began a gambling business and became involved in extortion. In 2008, Orsoni returned to Corsica and became president of the football club AC Ajaccio.

Orsoni was assassinated in January 2026.

== Early life ==
Orsoni was born in the town of Vero, on 27 September 1954, to a Corsican family. His father André (Andriu) Orsoni was a battle-hardened World War II veteran who had returned from the war in Indochina months before he was born. Shortly after, when Orsoni was very young, his father enlisted in the Algerian war, where he later joined the far-right pro-French terrorist group Organisation armée secrète (OAS). Orsoni grew up very close to his father, which is likely a reason his politics reflected that of his father's for most of his early years. His brother, Guy (Guidu) Orsoni was born 4 years after Alain. In 1972, Orsoni moved to Paris to pursue higher education at the Assas-Panthéon University. There, he joined the Union Defense Group, a far-right student union. However, his right-wing views began to change as he met with the left-wing Corsican nationalists at his school, particularly Léo Battesti, who would later become his close friend and fight with him in the Corsican conflict on the side of the FLNC. In the summer of 1975, Orsoni and Battesti returned to Corsica and joined a nationalist militant group, Azione Regiunalista Corsa (ARC). In August 1975, the ARC led the Aléria standoff, a military standoff on the eastern coast of Corsica. The ensuing chaos caused Orsoni to flee to a military camp before returning to Paris. In 1976, the National Liberation Front of Corsica formed, and Orsoni joined, quickly rising through the ranks to become the head of the FLNC's Paris division.

== In the original FLNC ==
=== Paris division leader ===
Orsoni was head of the FLNC's Paris division for 6 years. During that time, large-scale and harsh bombing campaigns were carried out in the city. In 1979, a series of attacks occurred in a short span of time: On 10 April, three banks in Paris were bombed, and courts in Paris were bombed shortly after, including the Paris Palace of Justice, in which a bombing caused over 3 million francs worth of damage. On 6 May, 20 buildings, mostly financial institutions, were bombed in Paris and on 30 May, a new wave of bombings occurred. A bombing of the Paris police headquarters at the beginning of June caused a large setback in operations against the guerrillas, both in Paris and in Corsica.

On 14 May 1980, a commando of FLNC fighters, personally led by Orsoni, engaged in a shootout in front of the Iranian embassy in Paris. This left one gendarme dead and it caused Orsoni to be captured and sent to prison shortly after. His two-year stay at Fleury-Mérogis prison was marked by turbulence when, in June 1981, a prison revolt broke out. The demands of the revolt were to release Orsoni as well as another separatist militant, Serge Cacciari, arrested in 1976 for the murder of a gendarme during the Aleria standoff. After a year, Orsoni and Cacciari were released on 2 March 1982 due to the "Defferre accords", an agreement between the FLNC and Mitterrand. Afterwards, he returned to Corsica, where he took charge of actions in Ajaccio.

=== Ajaccio Brigade leader; murder of Guy Orsoni ===
Once returning to Corsica, Orsoni and his brother Guy Orsoni had become something akin to folk heroes in nationalist circles. His command in Paris and his role in the prison revolt of 1981 had gained him significant fame, and it didn't take much time before both of the Orsoni brothers had become brigade leaders in the FLNC. Orsoni had taken up the post of Ajaccio, and had begun coordinating most of the actions in Corse-du-Sud.

On 17 June 1983, Alain and Guy Orsoni had met in the town of Sartène for an FLNC meeting. After parting ways, Guy Orsoni was kidnapped and murdered by members of the Valinco gang, a large mafia group at the time that was present throughout southern Corsica. Orsoni, as well as many Corsican nationalists, believe this was done in coordination with French government officials. This drove the FLNC, already at war with the French, to also begin a war with the Corsican mafia. On June 7, 1984, a year into the FLNC-mafia conflict, a commando in Ajaccio was assembled to break into a prison where Valinco gang members involved in the assassination of Guy Orsoni were being held and shoot them dead. Orsoni, overseeing the project from the sidelines, claimed it was "the greatest regret of his life" that he didn't attend personally. Meanwhile, Orsoni married Frédérique Campana, a lawyer, and together they had a son, named Guy in honour of Orsoni's deceased brother. Throughout the next four years, Orsoni balanced being a hardline guerrilla leader and a father to his son.

On 2 October 1983, Orsoni would participate in the creation of the Corsican Movement for Self-Determination (Muvimentu Corsu per l'Autodeterminazione, MCA), the political wing of the FLNC. He would be elected to the Corsican Assembly and become MCA president in March 1986. On 21 January 1987, the organization was banned by French authorities for "promotion of terrorism" after a scandal involving Bastia police led the MCA to call for nationalists to "be vigilant". After this, Orsoni was put in charge of creating the blueprints for a new political party for the organization. Orsoni’s creation and early leadership of A Cuncolta Naziunalista put him in even more of a powerful position within the FLNC, effectively running the organization.

== Collapse of the FLNC and leadership of the FLNC-CA and MPA ==
In 1988, a ceasefire was drawn up and signed between the FLNC and the French government. Orsoni had been one of the major architects of the peace, being a strong advocate of political solution and the right for Corsicans to choose a government to represent them. This didn't sit well with certain members of the FLNC, known as "Historiques" (Storichi in Corsican) who wanted to continue the fight. From 1988 to 1990, numerous brigades and members of the FLNC would begin to leave and create their own army, the FLNC-Canal Historique (Canale Storicu, FLNC-CS). This struck Ajaccio as well, where many became discontent with Orsoni. A dissident campaign was launched, led by Roger Polverelli, who was shot dead by FLNC gunmen in October 1989. Radical members of A Cuncolta Naziunalista removed Orsoni from power due to his lack of support for armed struggle, replacing him with Charles Pieri, a brigade leader from Bastia who was arrested in 1982 for the murder of a Foreign Legion member, and François Santoni, a brigade leader from the Gravona region known for being one of the most radical FLNC leaders. As the conflict escalated, Orsoni would take further control of the parts of the FLNC that didn't break off and engage in dissident struggle, and on 17 October 1990 the remains became the FLNC-Canal Habituel (FLNC-Canale Abituale, FLNC-CA), led by Orsoni alone.

Orsoni's policies were quite different under the FLNC-CA compared to his brigade leadership in the original FLNC. Rather than focusing on war with France, Orsoni pitted the Habituels against the Historiques, focusing much more on the civil war within the FLNC. This was confirmed during a January 1991 meeting of Canal Habituel members where a freeze on military actions against the French government is declared and also during a March 1991 meeting where this is affirmed and the structure of the Habituels is discussed.

In March 1992 the MPA ran for seats in the Corsican assembly. they won 4 seats, but Orsoni lost his own seat, a seat he had been holding since 1986. Orsoni nevertheless continued his leadership position from outside of the assembly.

Throughout the FLNC splinter conflict, a wave of assassinations on both sides occurred, some allegedly involving Orsoni himself as a shooter. Orsoni and his organizations would repeatedly denounce violence and militancy present in the Historiques, yet would also lead a militant movement within the Habituels.

Despite the efforts of Orsoni and his group, the size, organization, and hardline militancy of the Historiques helped them to prevail in the civil war. In March 1996, the FLNC-CS made a short-term agreement with the French government to lay down arms for a three-month period and begin negotiations. Despite the negotiations going nowhere, Orsoni, who used to be indifferent to the French government as far as attacks go, broke truce with the French and denounced this agreement. Two months later, Orsoni announced the "imminent self-dissolution" of the FLNC-CA. some more radical members claiming to want to resume warfare against the Historiques and the French left the organization and founded the FLNC-Five May (FLNC-Cinque Maghju, FLNC-5M). This caused a three-way feud between the Historiques, the remaining Habituels, and the "Maghjini". Orsoni, fearing for his safety and fearing arrest due to alleged profiteering charges, fled to the United States. The FLNC-CA was officially dissolved on 29 January 1997.

== Exile in the United States, Nicaragua, and Spain ==
Orsoni fled to Miami, Florida in 1996, where he opened a pizzeria. Then, after only months, he moved to Nicaragua, where he stayed for a number of years. There, he opened a casino with the help of a friend named Francis Perez, and began a system of alleged racketeering. He was expelled from Nicaragua in 2000, and settled in Barcelona, where he lived until 2008, when he returned to Corsica.

== Return to Corsica and leadership of AC Ajaccio ==
Orsoni returned to Corsica in early 2008.

In July 2008, Orsoni took up the post of president for AC Ajaccio after his close friend and political ally Michel Moretti had passed. He resigned in 2015 (though he was briefly president again during the 2022–23 season).

In August 2008, Orsoni narrowly escaped an assassination attempt carried out by the Brise de Mer, a Corsican mafia organization responsible for a large number of crimes in Corsica and beyond. In the year that followed, a number of people were indicted for the attempt, including former Grosseto-Prugna mayor Marie-Jeanne Bozzi and Pierre-Toussaint Michelosi.

== Assassination ==
On 12 January 2026, Orsoni was shot and killed while attending his mother's funeral in Corsica. He was 71. Orsoni was killed by a single gunshot to the heart fired from a long gun. Investigations were taken over by Parquet national anticriminalité organisée (PNACO) and Juridiction interrégionale spécialisée (JIRS). Prosecutor Nicolas Septe stated that the murder was being investigated as part of organised crime.
