= Bustanico revolt =

- Part of the Corsican conflict
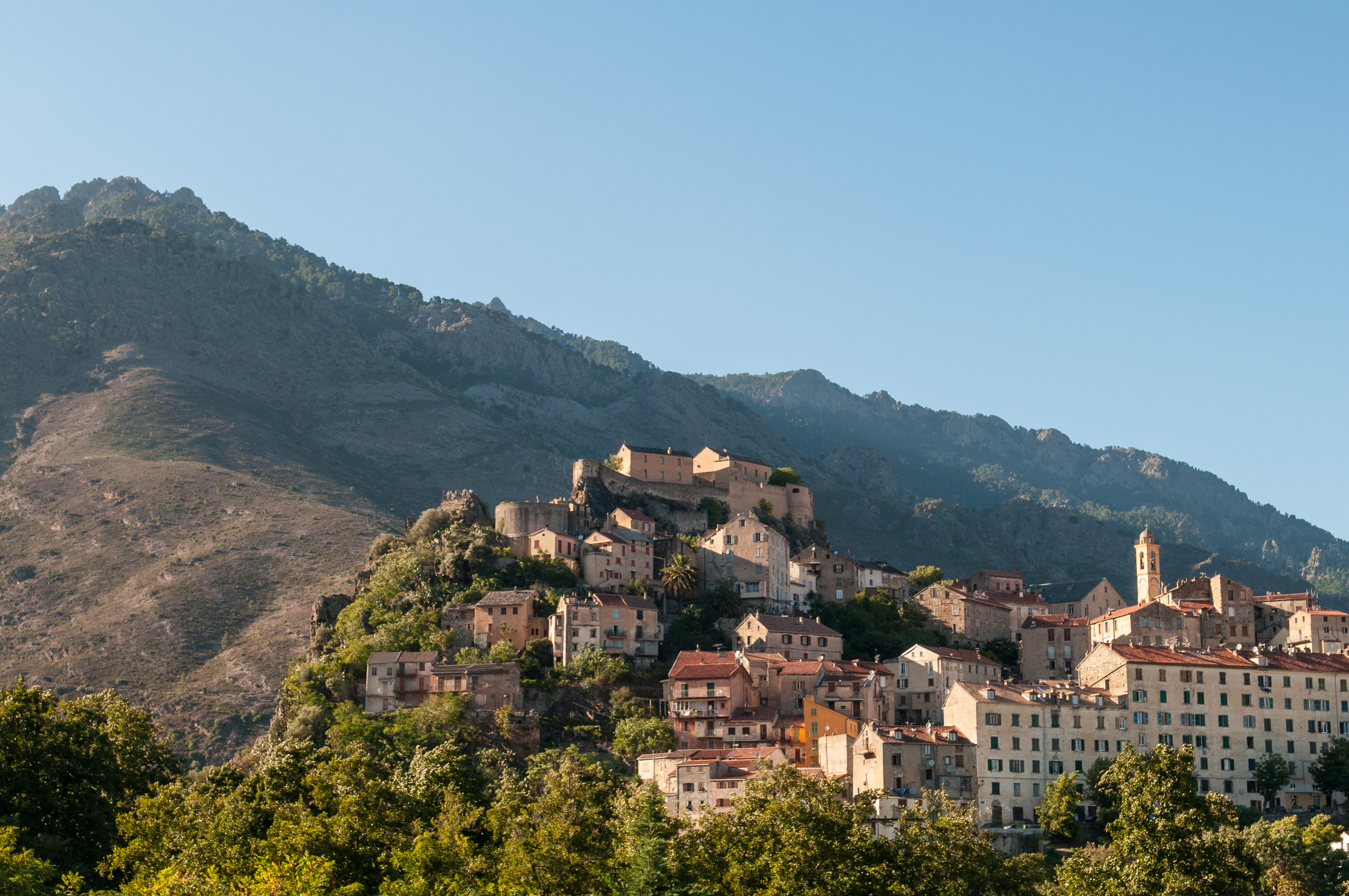
- Corte, the location of most of the rioting
- Date: 26 September - 28 September 1976
- Location: Corte and Bozio, Corsica
- Caused by: The murder of two shepherds by a German Foreign Legion deserter in the village of Bustanico; The presence of the Foreign Legion in Corte
- Goals: Withdrawal of the Foreign Legion from Corte
- Methods: Rioting, bombings, looting, ambushes
- Result: The Foreign Legion leaves Corte on 11 October

Parties
| (France) French government: French Foreign Legion | (Corsica) Corsican nationalists: National Liberation Front of Corsica |

Lead figures
| Michel Pierucci | Etienne Moracchini |

The Bustanico revolt (Corsican: Rivolta di Bustanicu) was a three-day period of mass protests, riots, civil unrest, and armed conflict in central Corsica, most notably in the city of Corte, following the shooting of two Corsican shepherds, Saveriu and Pasquinu Ruggeri, by a German member of the French Foreign Legion in the village of Bustanico in September 1976.

The murder of the Ruggeri brothers occurred only four months after the creation of the National Liberation Front of Corsica, which is considered to be the formal beginning of the Corsican conflict. The murders caused public sentiment against the Foreign Legion to turn extremely negative. The Bustanico revolt was characterised by intense violence, including riots, bombings, attempted lynchings, and the formation of vigilante gangs to "hunt down" Foreign Legion soldiers in Corte as well as the region surrounding Bustanico. The conflict resulted in the departure of the French Foreign Legion from Corte.

== Background ==
The French Foreign Legion had moved a large number of its operations to Corsica following the loss of Algeria in 1962. Half of the French Foreign Legion's soldiers were stationed in Corsica at bases in Bonifacio, Calvi, and Corte. Relations in Corte between the legionnaires and the citizens were initially positive; some women in the town had married legionnaires and many had hoped the presence of the Foreign Legion would boost the local economy. Relations between the Foreign Legion and Corte's population began to turn negative in the mid-1970s following the harsh suppression of local autonomist protests by the legionnaires on their missions to "maintain order". Large legionnaire patrols were used as military police throughout the Corsican conflict as well.

The National Liberation Front of Corsica (FLNC) was founded on 5 May 1976 as a culmination of growing unrest and sentiment against French authority on the island. One of the organisation's founding demands was the departure of the Foreign Legion from Corsica, which the group referred to as an "oppressive instrument of French colonialism". Local disdain against the foreign legion had grown as well, and some had even gone as far as to compare legionnaires to Nazi occupiers of foreign countries. In Corte, which had become a major centre of Corsican nationalism, locals had begun to view their city as occupied by the military. Civilian government had been slowly stripped, mayor Michel Pierucci had been caught in allegations of corrupt dealings with the Foreign Legion (the commander of which he had weekly meetings with and referred to as an "old friend"), and Corsican civilians were strongly discouraged from "fraternizing" with the Foreign Legion. A tense social environment also formed between Corsican women and prostitutes sent from mainland France to the Foreign Legion's bordel militaire de campagne (military field brothel). The prostitutes were encouraged by the Foreign Legion not to speak to Corsican civilians.

The commanders of the Foreign Legion in Corte had also developed a reputation for harsh discipline and extreme violent measures to keep their soldiers in line. Beatings were common, and men found guilty of violating an officer's orders were denied water and subject to torture, humiliation rituals, and sometimes rape. The Foreign Legion's disciplinary camp in Corte had become commonly referred to as "the concentration camp" by Corte's residents. The mistreatment caused a large number of desertions as men felt compelled to escape their mistreatment. Some tried fleeing as far as Sardinia and Elba, and many became petty thieves in the maquis. From January to August 1975, five hundred deserters had been caught by the Foreign Legion. Some who had been caught deserting or who were unable to desert committed suicide while in disciplinary detention.

== Events ==
In the late evening of 21 September 1976, Wolfgang Ludwig, a German member of the French Foreign Legion stationed in Corte, escaped from his guard post at the ammunition depot of the Legion's Corte base. Ludwig had deserted following fifty days of Foreign Legion training where he had been subjected to intense mistreatment. He was warned by other recruits on 15 August that "anything is better than being recaptured by the Legion". Armed with a rifle, Ludwig "wondered aimlessly" through the maquis for three days, robbing a resident of Alzi and stealing a watch. On 24 September 1976, Ludwig, looking for food and shelter, broke into a stone hut in the town of Bustanico where two shepherd brothers, Saveriu and Pasquinu Ruggeri, lived. Upon being discovered by the two, Ludwig stabbed Pasquinu with the bayonet of his rifle and shot Saveriu.

The bodies of the shepherds were found on 26 September. News reached Corte that a Foreign Legion soldier had murdered two men nearby, which sparked significant outrage. Barricades were erected across the city and unrest and riots began. The FLNC capitalised on this and swiftly began a guerrilla campaign against the Foreign Legion in the city. Around 9:00pm, a top general of Corte's Foreign Legion was fired on by FLNC gunmen in his car; his driver lost an ear in the attack but he remained unharmed. That same evening, the residence of another top general was bombed by the FLNC. (Note: Robert Ramsay states these events happened on 24 September in response to the killings in Bustanico, but the bodies were not found and the killings were not made public until 26 September according to multiple sources. Corsica Infurmazione puts these attacks on 26 September.)

Local counselor Étienne Moracchini stepped up as the leader for the aggrieved residents by establishing and chairing a "vigilance committee" to demand the withdrawal of the Legion from Corte.

Unrest and violence continued into 27 September. Riots continued and protestors occupied the subprefecture building chanting "a legione fora" (legion out) and barricades were erected surrounding it. Antoine Feracci, journalist for Corse-Matin, reported on the "mass psychosis" which had enveloped Corte. Vigilante gangs from the Bozio region (the region of Corsica where Bustanico is located) made their way to Corte, which had descended into lawlessness, and began "hunting down" Foreign Legion soldiers to kill. Some had even began targeting men with short hair who appeared to be soldiers in disguise. The FLNC participated in this violence as well, carrying out a car bomb attack on the subprefect. Late that day, a legionnaire was captured by a mob of rioters, who brought him to the city centre of Corte with a rope and attempted to hang him from a lamppost; he narrowly escaped.

On 28 September, a funeral was held in Bustanico for the two shepherds in which 2,000 people attended, including Jean Zuccarelli, mayor of Bastia, deputy in the National Assembly, and father of Émile Zuccarelli. On the same day, violence escalated significantly. "Protection commandoes" of the FLNC began to patrol the Bozio region on watch for legionnaires. Riots broke out across the city, notably in front of the mayor's office, where mayor Michel Pierucci addressed the rioters personally. He asked for calm and declared his intention to hold a special session of Corte's municipal council to "draw lessons from recent events". He also stated that Corte is "too poor to lose the Foreign Legion", stating that most of the city's small economy was based on its presence, but stated that "if events do not conclude", he would organise the removal of the foreign legion from the city. That same day, Wolfgang Ludwig was found in the Cervione region and arrested. Pierucci's statements and the arrest of Ludwig calmed rioters and ended most of the violence.

== Aftermath and legacy ==
Talks were held on 1 October 1976, and the Foreign Legion was forced to leave Corte ten days later. The killings in Bustanico and the inhumane treatment of soldiers in Corte, the extent of which did not become public until a year after the Legion's departure, helped cement the FLNC and nationalists more broadly as "heroes" in Corsica, fighting against a corrupt and colonial authority. This sentiment would gain more foundation and grow even more popular following the Bastelica-Fesch affair in 1980. A short trial was held for Ludwig in 1978, which resulted in life imprisonment.

The Foreign Legion would leave Bonifacio in 1983 after agreeing to depart during the 1982 Defferre accords. This leaves Calvi as the only city still home to the Foreign Legion in Corsica. The Ruggeri brothers and the uprising both play a major role in the history of Corsican nationalism. They have been commemorated by the band Canta U Populu Corsu, led by Petru Guelfucci, in their song "A strage di Bustanicu" (the massacre of Bustanico). A planned project by the commune of Bustanico is the foundation of a "memorial trail" from the village centre to the shepherds' hut.

== See also ==
- 1992 Coalisland riots
