= 5 May 1976 attacks =

Bomb attacks in Corsica

- Part of the Corsican conflict
- Location: Corsica, France, with two attacks in Marseille and Nice
- Date: 4–5 May 1976; 9:00 pm – 3:00 am
- Target: Various targets of French administration and business
- Attack type: Bombings
- Perpetrator: National Liberation Front of Corsica (1976–1990)
- Motive: A show of force to accompany the creation of the FLNC

On the night of 4–5 May 1976, a series of twenty-one bomb attacks occurred in Corsica, as well as in Nice and Marseille. These attacks were claimed by the previously unknown National Liberation Front of Corsica, which had been founded that same night. These attacks are known in Corsica simply by the date "5 May" (Corsican: 5 Maghju) or the "First Blue Night" (referring to blue night attacks, large bombing campaigns common in the Corsican conflict). Corse-Matin gave the attacks the name "the Night of Fire".

Attacks occurred in all of Corsica's major cities, as well as in towns across the island and in the cities of Nice and Marseille on the French mainland. The bombs used were of various strengths, with some causing major damage or collapse and some only causing minor damage. These attacks are commonly considered the starting point of the Corsican conflict. These attacks were paired with a manifesto released by the FLNC that morning entitled the "Manifesto of 5 May".

The 5 May attacks left an important legacy in Corsica and more broadly France. Corsican nationalists refer to it as the second "birth" of the modern nationalist movement after the Aleria standoff, and it was the beginning of major, organised armed struggle in Corsica, a practice which now dominates the island's modern history. In France, the attacks ushered the "Corsican problem" to the national spotlight as a "second Algeria" threatened the French government.

== Background ==
The struggle for Corsican autonomy began in the late 1950s, but grew largely in the early 1970s with the so-called "Riacquistu", a cultural "rebirth" which gave widespread popularity to the notion that Corsican cultural practices, heritage, history, and language were in need of protection as the French state threatened to impose French monoculturalism as they had to other ethnic minorities in France. The onset of the Riacquistu allowed for a surge in membership of the Action for Corsican Rebirth (Azzione per a Rinascita Corsa; ARC), an autonomist political party and militant organisation formed under the name Corsican Regionalist Action (Azzione Regiunalista Corsa; ARC) in 1967. Two small separatist armed groups, the Corsican Peasant Front for Liberation (FPCL) and Ghjustizia Paolina (GP), formed in 1973 and 1974 respectively. These organisations belived Simeoni's ARC was not radical enough and that Corsicans should adopt armed struggle as the primary means of independence.

In August of 1975, the ARC, led by the group's president Edmond Simeoni, occupied a wine cellar in Aleria leading to a tense standoff with French gendarmes, resulting in the death of two gendarmes and a self-inflicted injury of an ARC militant. Numerous ARC members were arrested as a result of this, and the organisation itself was banned, but public sympathy remained with the militants. In a poll conducted in Corsica soon after the standoff, the question "do you think that the action taken by the ARC at Aleria was initially justified?" was asked, and 62% of respondents answered yes, 21% answered no, and 17% did not express an opinion.

The FPCL and GP, as well as a large amount of ARC dissidents disillusioned with the group's stance on autonomy and moderate positions, began to enter into dialogue with one another by early 1976. The FPCL announced a ceasefire on 26 April 1976 to "broaden the armed struggle". It was likely then that discussions to form the FLNC began. At the same time, a group of men which would later make up the FLNC's Direzione met in Porto-Vecchio and planned a "spectacular show of force" using supplies and men from the three organisations (FPCL, GP, and ARC dissidents) which would become the 5 May attacks. These attacks were planned to occur shortly before the trial of Edmond Simeoni for the standoff in Aleria.

== Events of 4–5 May 1976 ==
=== Attacks in Bastia ===
The first bomb attack occurred at 9:00 pm on 4 May 1976, causing damage to the Haute-Corse Departmental Directorate of Equipment, the departmental directorate in charge of local infrastructure. A second bomb attack occurred at 9:15 pm targeting Bastia's tax office, causing minor damage. Both of these buildings had only been in operation relatively recently; Haute-Corse only came into existence a year prior, and the new tax office was opened just two months before the bombing.

=== Attacks in Ajaccio ===
At 9:30 pm, a large bomb exploded outside of the Ajaccio headquarters for Cyrneacolor, a wholesale company operating in Corsica owned by a pied-noir who had relocated following the end of the Algerian war. The explosion caused the collapse of the building and a fire so large it spread to neighbouring buildings. Also in Ajaccio, the car of the secretary-general of Corse-du-Sud, the highest office under the department's prefect. His car was completely destroyed. Another attack damaged Corse-du-Sud's Departmental Directorate of Equipment. Finally, at midnight on 5 May, a van used by the Ecotra logistics company was destroyed in a bomb attack.

=== Attacks in Corte ===
At 10:30 pm, a bomb detonated at the home of the colonel of the French Foreign Legion in Corte, causing significant damage. A few minutes later, another bomb caused extensive damage to Corte's post office. Lastly, at 12:15 am, a bomb damaged the Corte headquarters of the Association of Corsican Patriots, a group formed by ARC members to circumvent the ARC's ban. This attack was not claimed by the FLNC, however.

=== Attack in Sartène ===
The subprefecture building in Sartène was the target of a large bomb at midnight on 5 May. The explosion caused extensive damage and the near-collapse of one wall.

=== Attacks in Porto-Vecchio ===
At 1:15 am on 5 May, a villa belonging to a wealthy businessman from mainland France was bombed, causing significant damage. A nearby villa belonging to a white businessman from Dahomey was bombed at the same time, the damage causing a wall to collapse.

=== Attacks in Ghisonaccia ===
At 2:15 am, a bomb attack caused extensive damage to a petrol station in Ghisonaccia owned by a pied-noir. A second attack twenty minutes later destroyed a building in a winery owned by a pied-noir, Michel Mackiewicz, who was involved in a fraud case. The law firm building of Mackiewicz's lawyers was also leveled by a bomb attack.

=== Attack in Linguizzetta ===
A bomb attack completely destroyed a 100-square metre bungalow at the Corsicana nature camp, a camp owned by a German entrepreneur.

=== Attack in Francardo ===
a 2.5 kilogram bomb caused damage to a timber company in Francardo owned by a Frenchman living in mainland France.

=== Attack in Calenzana ===
A firing range used by the Foreign Legion in Calenzana was bombed.

=== Attempted attack in Biguglia ===
A bomb was found undetonated in the morning of 5 May at the premises of a construction company in Biguglia owned by a pied-noir.

=== Attacks in Nice and Marseille ===
A bank in Nice was the target of a bomb attack. In Marseille, the bombing of the Marseille Courthouse caused minor damage.

=== Other events ===
The FLNC's founding manifesto, entitled the Manifesto of 5 May, was also handed out by masked militants across Corsica during the bombings. Occurring at the same time as these bombings, a private conference was held at Saint-Antoine de Casabianca, a church in northern Corsica, between the FPCL, GP, and ARC dissidents. There, they officially founded the National Liberation Front of Corsica (FLNC). The next morning, an anonymous caller from the FLNC called Corse-Matin's headquarters and claimed responsibility for the bombings and announced the creation of the FLNC.

== Aftermath ==
Prefect of Corsica Jean-Étienne Riolacci found out about the attacks from the press. Riolacci was accused of downplaying the severity of the actions, stating to the press, "A Corsican FLN, come on, this is not serious". Riolacci would not take the FLNC as a serious threat to his position until the blue night of 20 May 1976, in which the FLNC carried out more attacks in order to support the isula morta general strike called by Corsican workers to support Simeoni during his trial.
