= Fleury-Mérogis Prison =

Large prison in France

Coordinates: 48.637904°N 2.3733248°E

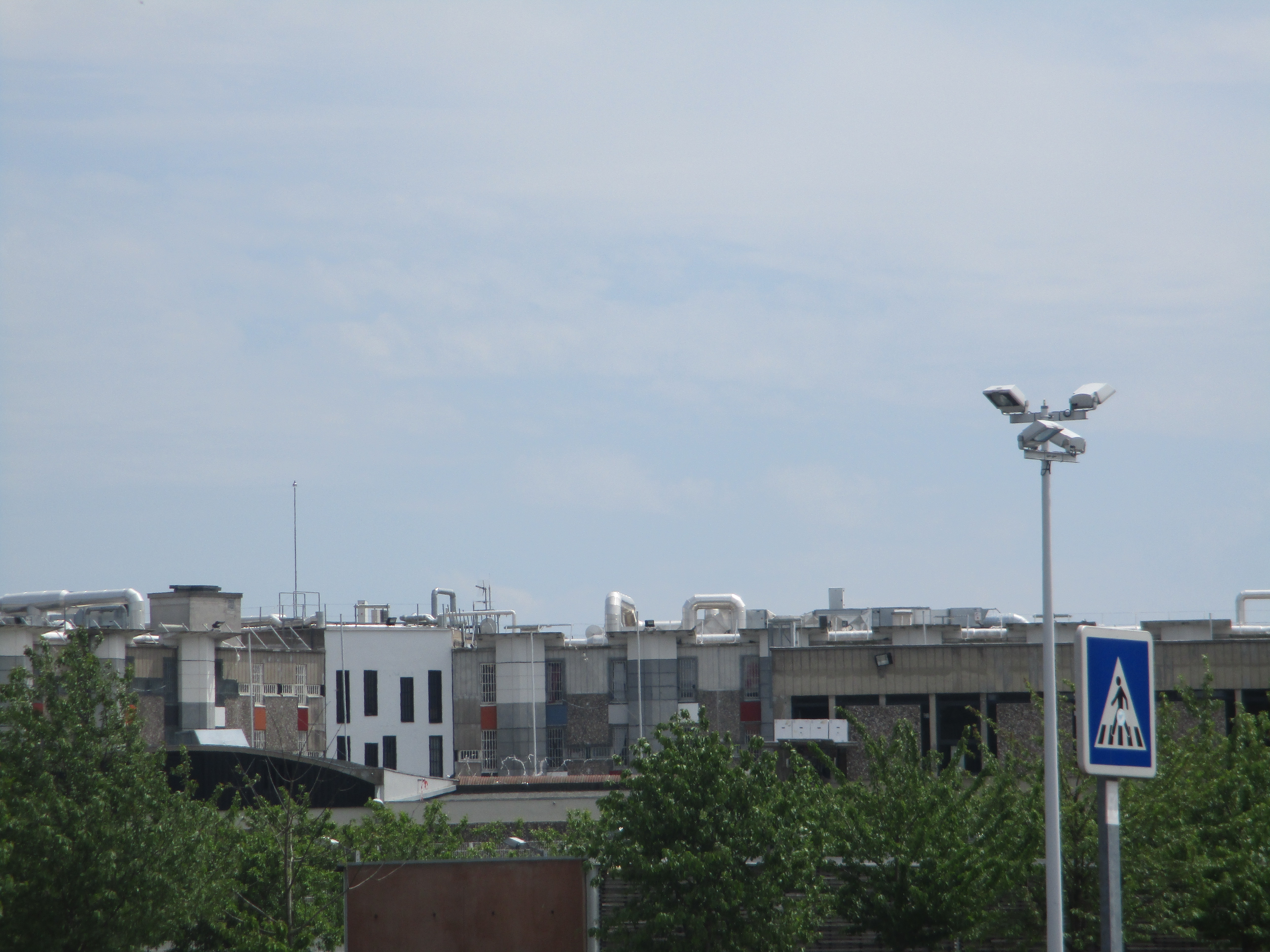
- Interactive map of Fleury-Mérogis Prison
- Location: Fleury-Mérogis, France
- Status: Operational
- Capacity: 2,956
- Population: 4,300+ (2018)
- Opened: 1968
- Managed by: Ministry of Justice
- Website: Official website

Fleury-Mérogis Prison (Maison d'arrêt de Fleury-Mérogis) is a prison in France, located in the town of Fleury-Mérogis, in the southern suburbs of Paris. With more than 4,100 prisoners, it is the largest prison in Europe. It is operated by the Ministry of Justice.

Fleury-Mérogis is notorious as a leading center of Islamist radicalization in European prisons.

== History ==
Built between 1964 and 1968, the 180 hectare complex of Fleury-Mérogis comprises four entities:

- a large men's jail;
- a smaller women's jail;
- a juveniles' jail;
- Gendarmerie barracks.

The main prison is formed by a polygonal central building from which radiate five blocks, each one consisting of three wings with four levels of cells. Each block has a capacity of 900 prisoners.

Fleury-Mérogis is one of the three main prisons of the Paris area, the Fresnes Prison (the second largest in France) and the La Santé Prison (located in the centre of Paris) being the other two.

In June 1981, a prison revolt occurred within the Corsican population of Fleury-Mérogis, who had been staying there due to their connections with the ongoing guerrilla conflict in Corsica. They demanded the release of Alain Orsoni, a leader of the National Liberation Front of Corsica in Paris, and Serge Cacciari, a key participant in the Aleria standoff accused of the shooting of a gendarme.

== Characteristics ==
There is wire surrounding the top of the building, preventing helicopter and other possible escapes. The bottom of the building is enclosed with trash that the prisoners have thrown.

While overcrowded (at 143% capacity as of 2018, with over 4,300 inmates), Fleury-Mérogis is still under less population stress than other locations such as Fresnes Prison and Villepinte Prison.

== Notable inmates ==
Infamous and notable past and present prisoners include:

- Salah Abdeslam (connected to the planning of the November 2015 Paris attacks and the 2016 Brussels bombings)
- Joëlle Aubron (member of Action directe revolutionary group)
- Djamel Beghal
- Serge Cacciari, Corsican militant accused of assassinating a gendarme during the Aleria standoff
- Georges Cipriani (member of Action directe revolutionary group)
- Amedy Coulibaly (one of three perpetrators of the January 2015 Île-de-France attacks)
- Christine Deviers-Joncour (protagonist of the Elf scandal)
- Hassan Diab (sociologist) (accused of first degree murder in 1980 Paris synagogue bombing, charges dropped, and released)
- JoeyStarr (sentenced for six months)
- Herve Ryssen (Herve Lalin) far right commentator.
- Chérif Kouachi (connected to the planning of the November 2015 Paris attacks and the 2016 Brussels bombings)
- Saad Lamjarred (accused of rape of a 20-year old woman)
- Jacques Mesrine (one of France's most notorious criminals)
- David Noakes British citizen and promoter of the unproven therapy GcMAF
- Alain Orsoni, Corsican politician and guerrilla leader, leader of the National Liberation Front of Corsica's Paris division at the time of imprisonment
- Thierry Paulin
- Tarik Andrieu/Ademo
- Petr Pavlensky (held while awaiting trial for political performance art resulting in property damage)
- Pascal Payet (Paroled in April 2019)
- Sinik (sentenced four times)
- Zouzou (for recreational drug use)
- Rokia Traore
