= Corsican National Alliance =

Corsican nationalist political party

Corsican National Alliance Accolta Naziunale Corsa
- Leader: Pierre Poggioli
- Founded: 24 October 1989
- Split from: A Cuncolta Naziunalista
- Merged into: Corsica Libera
- Headquarters: Bastia, Corsica
- Armed wing: Resistenza (1989-2003)
- Ideology: Corsican nationalism far-left

Website
- http://www.anc-corsica.com

The Corsican National Alliance (Corsican: Accolta Naziunale Corsa, ANC) was a far-left Corsican Nationalist political party formed in 1989 by Pierre Poggioli, former president of the Corsican Movement for Self-Determination (Muvimentu Corsu per l'Autodeterminazione, MCA) and a key leader of the National Liberation Front of Corsica. The ANC, for most of its history, was eclipsed by its armed wing, Resistenza.

== See also ==
- Corsica Nazione
- A Cuncolta Naziunalista
- Muvimentu Corsu per l'Autodeterminazione

== Official Site ==
- http://www.anc-corsica.com/
