= 1992 Coalisland riots =

Clashes in County Tyrone, Northern Ireland

- Part of the Troubles and Operation Banner
- Confrontation between a British paratrooper and a civilian in Coalisland (May 1992)
- Date: 12 and 17 May 1992
- Location: Coalisland, County Tyrone, Northern Ireland; 54°32′23.92″N 6°42′01.82″W
- Caused by: Provisional IRA attack on British army patrol near the village of Cappagh, County Tyrone
- Result: Parachute Regiment patrols in Northern Ireland cancelled before official tour's end; Commanding officer of Northern Ireland's Third Brigade removed

Parties
Coalisland residents	(United Kingdom) British Army

Casualties and losses
3 hospitalised At least 4 others injured	2 soldiers hospitalised 7 others wounded
- Location within Northern Ireland
- Another soldier lost his legs during the previous IRA bomb attack at Cappagh

The 1992 Coalisland riots were a series of clashes on 12 and 17 May 1992 between local Irish nationalist civilians and British Army soldiers (of the Third Battalion of the Parachute Regiment and the King's Own Scottish Borderers) in the town of Coalisland, County Tyrone, Northern Ireland. The Third Battalion 1992 tour's codename was "Operation Gypsy".

== Provisional IRA attack ==
On 12 May 1992, a unit of the Provisional Irish Republican Army (IRA) East Tyrone Brigade launched a bomb attack on a British Army foot patrol near the republican stronghold of Cappagh, County Tyrone. One soldier of the Parachute Regiment, Alistair Hodgson, lost both legs as a result. The improvised landmine was described in an IRA statement as an "anti-personnel device". Other paratroopers received lesser wounds, according to the same statement. The incident triggered a rampage by members of the Parachute Regiment in the nearby, overwhelmingly Irish nationalist town of Coalisland, some ten miles to the east. The IRA attack was described as a "provocation" tactic, devised to produce an over-reaction by troops to make them even more unpopular among local nationalists.

The deployment of the paratroopers, which began in April had already been criticised by republican activist and former Member of Parliament Bernadette Devlin McAliskey, who denounced beatings, shootings and damages to property reportedly carried out by the troops. These previous incidents included the destruction of fishing gear and boats in the townland of Kinturk, near Ardboe, and a brawl on 22 April between soldiers and motorists at a checkpoint in Stewartstown, in which plastic bullets were fired that ended with a civilian and two paratroopers wounded. Unionist politician and Ulster Defence Regiment officer Ken Maginnis, then-Member of Parliament for the area, called for the withdrawal of the regiment after receiving a large number of complaints about their behaviour.

== The confrontation ==
=== 12 May ===
Two hours after the IRA ambush at Cappagh, members of the regiment sealed off the town of Coalisland, ten miles east of Cappagh. According to a Social Democratic and Labour Party politician, the soldiers fabricated a bogus bomb warning, while the Royal Ulster Constabulary (RUC) stated that the operation began when a joint police/military patrol was stoned by a crowd. Two pubs were ransacked by the troops and a number of civilian cars were damaged. Several people were allegedly hit with sticks. Following this, a lieutenant was suspended from duty and the regiment was removed from patrol duties in Coalisland.

=== 17 May ===
On the evening of 17 May, a fist-fight broke out on Lineside Road, where a group of young men were drinking. A passing four-man patrol of the King's Own Scottish Borderers (KOSB) was challenged to a 'boxing match' by the residents. The soldiers set aside their weapons and engaged the youths, with minor injuries reported on both sides.

Official reports later claimed the patrol had been attacked by a mob of at least 30 people. During the mêlée, a rifle and a light machine gun were stolen. The rifle was later recovered nearby, and the machine gun 11 days later at a farmhouse near Cappagh. The youths also smashed a radio left behind by the troops, two KOSB soldiers were hospitalised.

The Parachute Regiment was called to the scene, and at 8:30 p.m., a riot erupted outside The Rossmore pub between local people and around 25 paratroopers. The soldiers claimed that one of their colleagues had been isolated and dragged by the crowd. Some witnesses reported that paratroopers were in a frenzy, brandishing their guns and challenging civilians to attempt to take them. Shots were fired by the troops first into the air, then towards the crowd outside the pub. Three civilians were rushed to hospital in Dungannon with gunshot wounds, while the soldiers returned to their barracks. Another four civilians sustained minor injuries. The paratroopers stated that a "member of the growing crowd" attempted to fire the stolen machine gun at them, but the weapon jammed. One of the wounded was the brother of IRA volunteer Kevin O'Donnell, who had been killed by the Special Air Service (SAS) in February during an ambush at the nearby hamlet of Clonoe, shortly after carrying out a machine-gun attack on the local RUC base. A total of seven British soldiers, including paratroopers, sustained minor injuries, one struck by a car that breached two roadblocks.

== Aftermath ==
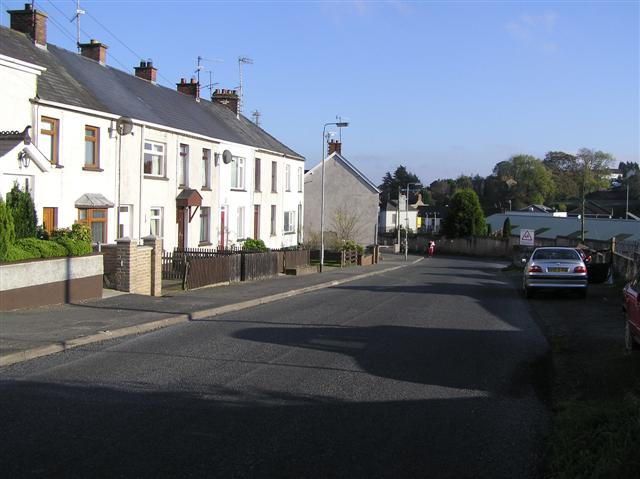
One of the roads to Coalisland centre, which was blocked by British paratroopers on 12 May 1992

About 500 people attended a protest rally in Coalisland on 19 May, and the wisdom of deploying the troops to patrol the town was questioned by members of the Dáil in Dublin. The Minister for Foreign Affairs of the Republic of Ireland, David Andrews, asked the British Government to withdraw the regiment. As a result, the paratroopers were redeployed outside the urban areas. The RUC claimed that the stolen machine gun was found 11 days later at a farmhouse near Cappagh, along with another light machine gun and an AK-47 rifle. Author Steven Taylor claims that the stolen GPMG and other weaponry was recovered following an aborted IRA attack against a Wessex helicopter. The IRA had denied they had the machine gun in their possession. Republicans questioned whether the weapon had really been stolen, suggesting this was merely an excuse for the soldiers' rampage in Coalisland. Bernardette McAliskey went even further, suggesting that the recovery of the machine gun near Cappagh, where the initial IRA attack had taken place, was actually staged by the security forces as a publicity stunt. British officials accused Sinn Féin of being the instigators of the riots, while Michael Mates, then Minister of State at the Northern Ireland Office, stated that the incidents were due to "a gang of thugs motivated by the IRA". Eventually the battalion's 1992 tour in Northern Ireland was scaled down, with the patrols suspended before the official end of the deployment. The Third Brigade's commander, Brigadier Tom Longland, was replaced by Brigadier Jim Dutton. This was the first occasion that a high-ranking officer was disciplined in such a way during the Troubles.

The last patrol took place on 27 June, when two paratroopers drowned while crossing the River Blackwater. The same day there were further clashes with local residents, this time in the town of Cookstown, when a group of people that the Belfast News-Letter called "drunken hooligans" assaulted a number of paratroopers trying to help an elderly man who was suffering a heart attack.

The 3rd Battalion of the Parachute Regiment was replaced by the 1st Battalion of the Coldstream Guards.

Six soldiers faced criminal charges for their roles in the May riots, but were acquitted one year later. Five were bound over. Maurice McHugh, the presiding magistrate, averred that the soldiers were "not entirely innocent", while Sinn Féin sources dubbed the ruling "a farce". Dungannon priest Father Denis Faul was of the opinion that the soldiers should have been charged with conspiracy. The Ulster Television documentary Counterpoint of June 1993 claimed that Northern Ireland's Director of Public Prosecutions Sir Alisdair Fraser returned the case file to the RUC recommending no prosecution. The programme also interviewed Alistair Hodgson, the soldier maimed at Cappagh, who said that "had another member of my unit been injured in the way that I was, I would have been with the rest of the lads attacking the locals". Authors Andrew Sanders and Ian S. Wood suggested that the deployment of the battalion in Coalisland and elsewhere hindered the British policy of police primacy in Northern Ireland.

Fresh clashes between local residents and troops were reported at Coalisland on 6 March 1994, a few months before the first IRA ceasefire, when a crowd assaulted two soldiers after the RUC searched a car. Plastic bullets were fired, and three civilians and two soldiers were slightly injured.

== See also ==
- Chronology of Provisional Irish Republican Army actions (1990–1999)
- 1997 Coalisland attack
- Bustanico revolt

== Online references ==
- Photo of Coalisland residents demonstrating outside the local RUC barracks, 19 May 1992 (Subscription required)
- Photo of Northern Ireland GOC Lt Gen Sir John Wilsey visiting troops deployed outside Coalisland, 19 May 1992 (Subscription required)
