= Bastelica-Fesch affair =

1980 military engagement during the Corsican conflict

Bastelica-Fesch Affair
- Part of the Corsican conflict
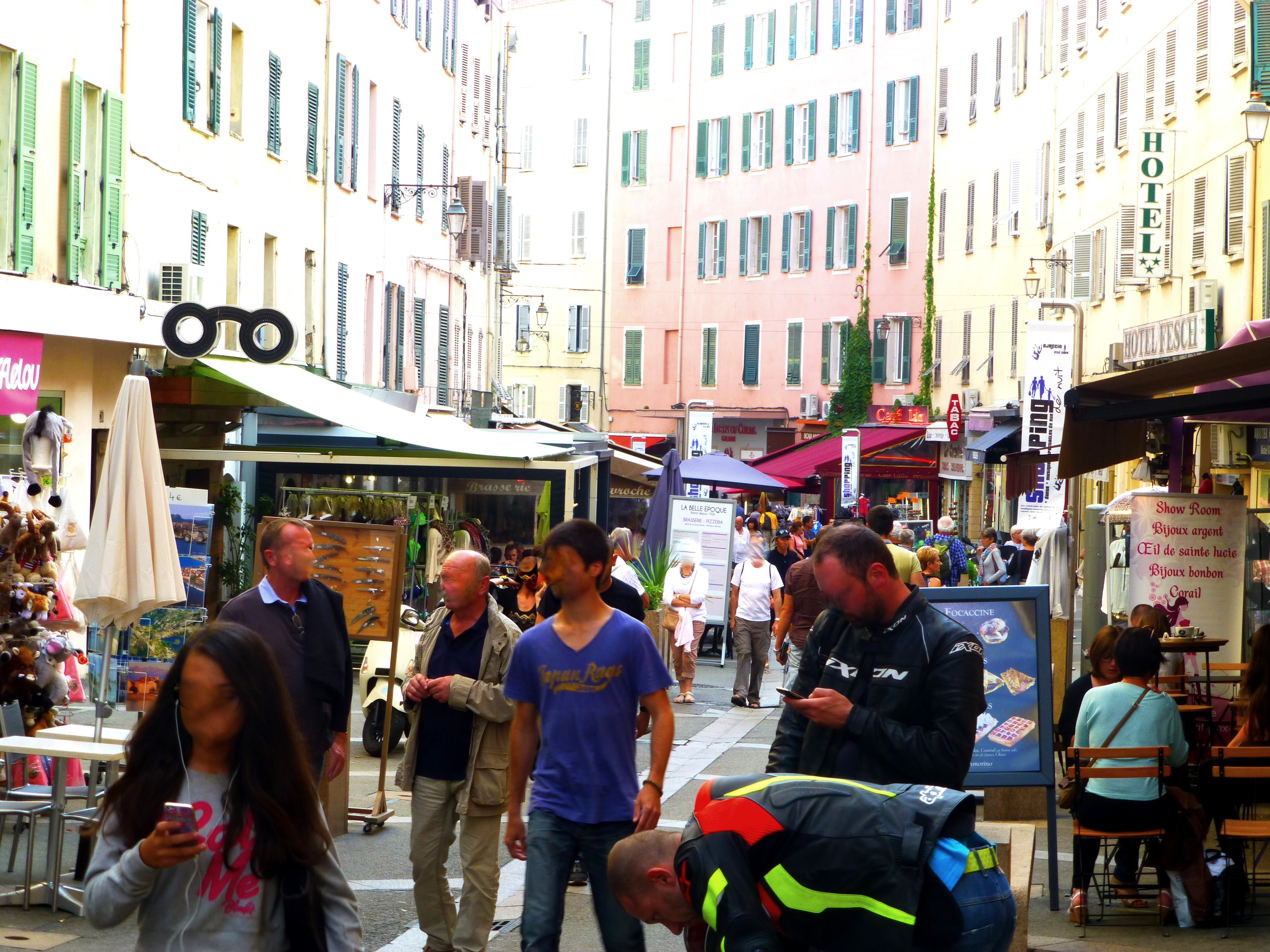
- Rue Fesch in 2014. Hôtel Fesch is visible on the right side of the image.
Date	6 January - 11 January 1980
Location	Bastelica and Ajaccio, Corsica, France
Result	see Aftermath

Belligerents
(France) France; Front d'Action Nouvelle Contre l'Independence et l'Autonomie	National Liberation Front of Corsica (Corsica) Union of the Corsican People

Commanders and leaders
(France) Valéry Giscard d'Estaing; Pierre Bertolini	Pierre Poggioli (Corsica) Marcel Lorenzoni

Units involved
National Gendarmerie	(Corsica) Bastelica Nationalist Collective

The Bastelica-Fesch affair, also known as the Battle of Bastelica-Fesch or the Siege of Bastelica-Fesch, was a major engagement of the Corsican conflict which occurred between 6 and 11 January 1980. Three members of the anti-separatist paramilitary Front d’Action Nouvelle Contre l’Indépendance et l’Autonomie were taken hostage by guerrillas from the pro-separatist National Liberation Front of Corsica in the town of Bastelica, resulting in a several-day standoff between the separatists and police forces in the Hôtel Fesch in Ajaccio.

== Initial events ==
On 6 January 1980, a group of three men began driving towards the Corsican town of Bastelica. The three men were Pierre Bertolini, a former French soldier, Alain Olliel, and Yannick Leonelli. The three were members of the Front d’Action Nouvelle Contre l’Indépendance et l’Autonomie (FRANCIA), an anti-separatist militant group, and were planning on assassinating Marcel Lorenzoni, a separatist militant who had taken part in the Aleria standoff in 1975. Lorenzoni had received a threatening phone call a day earlier from FRANCIA alerting him of their plan. In the trunk of the vehicle they were travelling in were multiple handguns, rifles, and shotguns, as well as membership cards for the Service d'Action Civique, a pro-government paramilitary force operating in mainland France as a parallel police force for Valéry Giscard d'Estaing. FRANCIA had close ties to the SAC, and both organisations were close to the French government and being run by Rally for the Republic, the largest Gaullist party at the time. FRANCIA members even collaborated with French authorities during some of their guerrilla actions.

The vehicle the three men were driving in was intercepted by a group of soldiers from the National Liberation Front of Corsica (FLNC) as soon as they entered Bastelica, who stopped the car and took the three men hostage. FLNC soldiers, alongside members of the Union of the Corsican People (UPC), an autonomist political party of which Lorenzoni belonged to, handed out arms to civilians and occupied Bastelica, secured it with roadblocks in the surrounding areas, and declared the "Bastelica Nationalist Collective", a military and governing body for the occupation.

== Conflict in Bastelica ==
Bastelica was occupied by the FLNC-UPC's Bastelica Nationalist Collective on 6 January 1980. In the following days, roadblocks were placed in multiple places around the town to prevent interception from French police or military forces. French soldiers were sent to stand guard at the other side of these roadblocks with machine guns. Meanwhile, helicopters from the French Army were sent to conduct aerial intelligence missions. The FRANCIA hostages were held in the town hall of Bastelica.

On 8 January, men from the Gendarmerie Nationale were sent in armoured cars, jeeps, and all-terrain trucks to recapture the town. Early that morning, the Gendarmerie besieged the town and demanded the FLNC withdraw and hand over the "prisoners" (the three FRANCIA men captured on 6 January) before 15:30. The FLNC responded with their own list of demands, including the withdrawal of French authorities from the roadblocks and the surrounding area, the right for reporters to visit the island (reporters at the time were being barred by authorities from reporting the Corsican conflict on-site due to alleged security reasons), and a judge and investigating prosecutor to come to Bastelica and investigate FRANCIA's crimes.

Authorities refused, taking a hardline anti-negotiation stance, and descended upon the town at 15:30, retaking it swiftly. Most members of the Bastelica Collective stayed behind, fighting a protracted guerrilla conflict in the town, while a group of thirty FLNC members moved to the Hôtel Fesch in Ajaccio with the three FRANCIA hostages.

Conflict continued in Bastelica as a large military force of gendarmes occupied the town and suspended civil law. Ambushes and machine gun attacks by the FLNC were common, especially at vehicle checkpoints established by the gendarmes.

== Standoff at the Hôtel Fesch ==
At 3:00am on 9 January, the thirty FLNC members arrived at Ajaccio's Hôtel Fesch disguised as customers. The three hostages, as well as seventeen hotel guests, were held there alongside the guerrillas. The FLNC issued a speech at the hotel where they relayed their initial demands and discussed the French government's ties to FRANCIA. Police quickly blocked off Rue Fesch with checkpoints and prevented anyone from walking near the hotel.

The FLNC had gained large amount of popular support since their formation in 1976, and the government's harsh response, opposition to negotiations, and connections to FRANCIA only gave the nationalists more sympathy. Protests, riots, and demonstrations were occurring outside the hotel for the entire duration of the standoff. Considerable press was given to the situation, including internationally. In the United States, the situation was regularly reported on by the New York Times, who gave Corsica the label "the Appalachia of France".

Hundreds of riot police from the GIGN were sent to the Hôtel Fesch from across France. Protests and riots quickly became violent at the hands of both police and demonstrators. In the evening of 9 January, a protestor drew a weapon on a police officer. The officer was killed, and police opened fire on the protestors, wounding two. Later that same night, police opened fire on three women during a vehicle check, killing one and wounding the other two. Also that same night, a twenty-three year old man who police falsely believed to be crossing a roadblock was shot and killed. In all of these incidents, riot police held journalists and paramedics attempting to help the wounded at gunpoint, directing them away from the wounded with threats of violence.

On 10 January, the protestors unfurled the Flag of Corsica on the facade of the hotel. The government, weary of the increasing tensions across Corsica, sent Ajaccio mayor Charles Ornano, a Bonapartist and hardline anti-separatist, to negotiate with the FLNC. Bishop of Ajaccio Jean-Charles Thomas willingly entered the occupied hotel to help negotiate peace as well with the support of the catholic Corsican separatists.

On 11 January, following negotiations, the separatists surrendered. A police officer trained in psychology made his way to the roof of the hotel and talked the FLNC into surrendering. The FLNC members were let out of the building through a back ally, aided by the owners of the hotel, who had supported their endeavours. They marched in a parade to the police station with hundreds of supporters who had been protesting since the occupation began. The parade sang Corsican folk songs the entire way there.

== Aftermath ==
All thirty of the men involved were taken into custody, but only eight were charged, including Marcel Lorenzoni.

Following the incident, both the police and the FLNC viewed the entire series of events to be "in vain", causing nothing but conflict and death. Despite this, the FLNC gained another surge of popular support as many Corsicans began to view the French government as impossible to negotiate with and too harsh and violent. This made the FLNC "bringers of justice" in the perspective of most Corsicans.

In early 1981, eight of the separatist militants who had taken part in the affair were sentenced to incarceration. Notably, none of the FRANCIA members were tried for any crimes. Following the verdicts, the FLNC set off several bombs targeting French authorities across the island.

== Analysis ==
Deborah Paci of the University of Modena and Reggio Emilia wrote in 2023 that the affair "helped to reinforce the image of nationalists as bringers of justice in the popular mind. The State was accused of having entered into a privileged relationship with the barbouzes operating in the FRANCIA movement."
