= 1981 Ajaccio airport bombing =

Bomb attack in Corsica, France

Coordinates: 41.9198°N 8.7943°E

- Part of the Corsican conflict
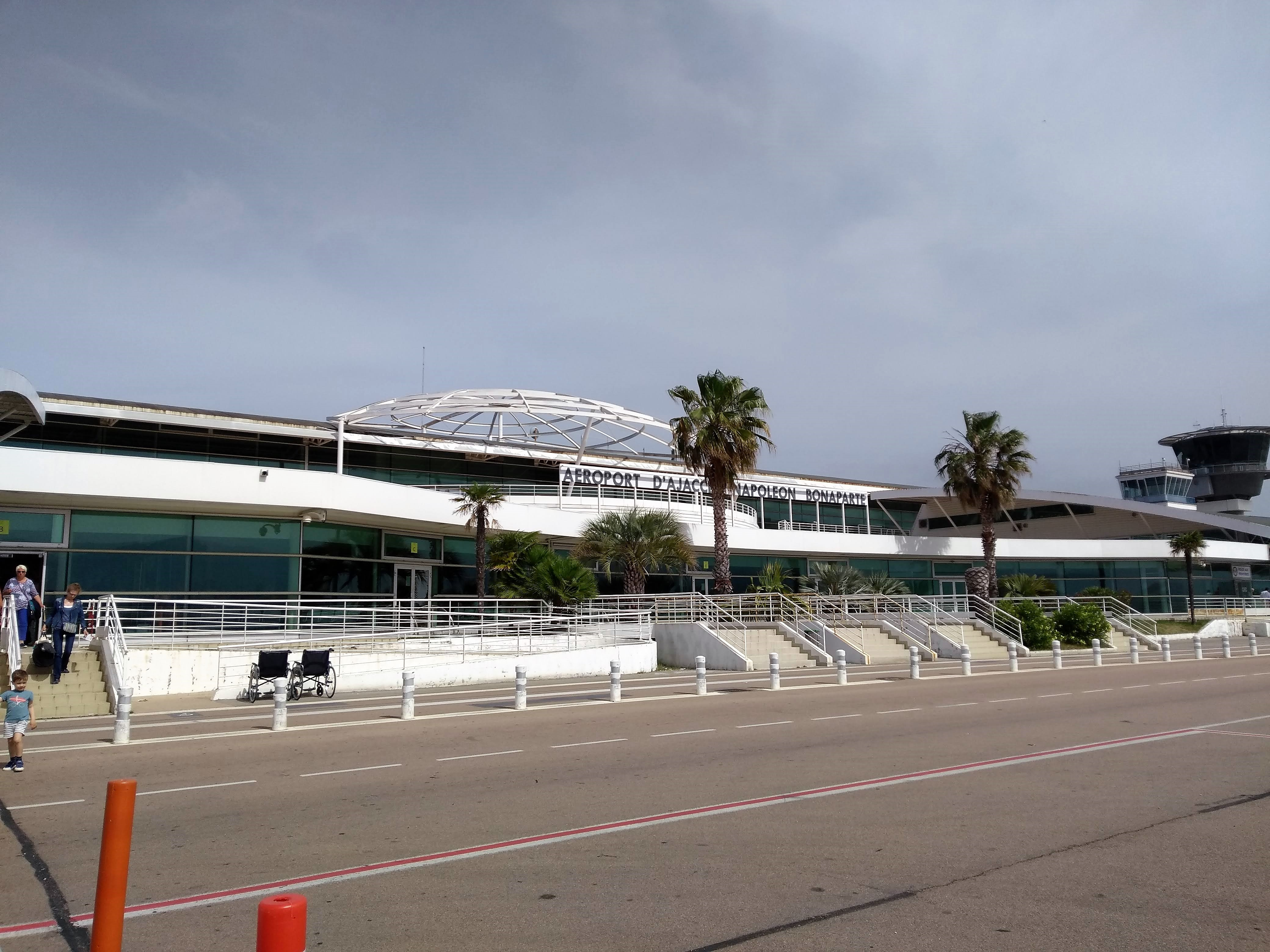
- View of the Ajaccio airport terminal, the scene of the attack.
- Location: Ajaccio Napoleon Bonaparte Airport, Ajaccio, Corsica, France
- Date: 16 April 1981; 5:23 p.m.
- Target: Valéry Giscard d’Estaing
- Attack type: Bomb attack
- Deaths: 1
- Injuries: 8
- Perpetrator: National Liberation Front of Corsica

On 16 April 1981, the Ajaccio Napoleon Bonaparte Airport was targeted with two large time bombs placed in the airport terminal in an attempt to assassinate French president Valéry Giscard d’Estaing, who had landed in Corsica for a presidential visit only two minutes before the bombs detonated. Giscard was only 500 yards (457.20 m) away at the time of the explosion.

The bombing killed one person and injured eight, and it remains one of the most notable attacks in a French airport.

== Background ==
On 5 May 1976, the National Liberation Front of Corsica formed, the first of its name. This scaled the Corsican conflict from a low-level insurgency to a large-scale guerrilla conflict, similar to the troubles in Northern Ireland. Attacks were nearly nightly, with 240 attacks just from January to April 1981.

By 1980 the conflict had escalated significantly. In January 1981, the “Battle of Bastelica-Fesch” occurred, in which FLNC members held back forces of both the French police and members of the pro-French New Action Front Against Independence and Autonomy, who had entered the town in an attempt to assassinate a separatist politician living there. Attacks on the French mainland were also becoming increasingly common, such as the 1980 Iranian embassy attack in Paris.

On 1 April 1981, the FLNC declared a temporary truce to not hinder the left in the 1981 presidential election, as the French left was more sympathetic to Corsican independence or autonomy than the right wing, centered around then current French president Valéry Giscard d’Estaing. Their hostility towards Giscard and the right-wing parties remained, however.

== Bombing ==
At around 5:10 p.m. on 16 April 1981, a call was made to local police forces in Ajaccio, claiming that a large bomb attack was about to occur at the Ajaccio airport during the landing of the plane carrying Valéry Giscard d’Estaing, who was travelling to Corsica to campaign for the upcoming 1981 election. Due to the tense climate in Corsica at the time, the police disregarded the call and labeled it a hoax. At 5:18 p.m., Giscard’s plane landed, and he made his way to the airport’s terminal. As he entered, at 5:23 p.m., two large time bombs exploded, partially destroying the terminal.

One person, a 19-year-old Swiss tourist, died at the scene. Eight other people were wounded. Giscard, however, remained uninjured. Later accounts from François Santoni contribute this to Giscard taking a route through the terminal which was different from the expected route. The bomb exploded in the room Giscard was expected to be in.

== Investigation and aftermath ==
Immediately after the attack, Giscard gave a speech in Ajaccio, stating, “I will not modify my visit here in the slightest.” In his speech, he called the attack “cowardly” and said the attack was “an attitude unworthy of Corsica”. He continued his campaign in Corsica before leaving from Bastia on 17 April.

Suspicions of the attack were immediate. The director of the anti-terrorism cells in Paris took note of the lack of police action, even with a phone call warning of the attack nearly 10 minutes before it occurred.

The attack was at first suspected to be committed by the Service d'Action Civique (SAC), a Gaullist armed organization known to carry out particularly brutal attacks against people and organizations they deem “against their cause”, or the New Action Front Against Independence and Autonomy (Front d’Action Nouvelle Contre l’Indépendance et l’Autonomie, FRANCIA), a pro-French, anti-separatist guerrilla group in Corsica fighting against the FLNC with close ties to the SAC. This was the leading theory of Roger Colombani, editor for le Matin de Paris, who claimed to have been informed that the Marseille sector of the SAC had “played a certain role”. When Colombani asked Christian Bonnet, former minister of the interior, about the situation during a hearing of a special committee formed to discuss SAC actions, Bonnet replied “I have no knowledge of this affair”.

The FLNC did not claim the attack directly. Instead, it was claimed using a cover name, the “Francs-Tireurs et Partisans Corses”, a name they had used to claim multiple attacks before. Pierre Poggioli, leader of the FLNC, denied FLNC involvement, suggesting it to be the work of “dissident separatists” unhappy with the ceasefire. It wasn’t until 2000 when the attack was properly claimed, when François Santoni, former FLNC brigade leader, explained that members of the FLNC’s Gravona Brigade, the brigade Santoni led, carried out the attack.

The 1981 ceasefire would eventually lead to the 1982 Defferre agreements, a series of agreements on Corsican autonomy which notably created the Corsican Assembly and reopened the University of Corsica Pasquale Paoli. The ceasefire would end later in 1982 after the French government failed to deliver on many promises, notably the removal of the French Foreign Legion from Corsica.
