= A Cuncolta Naziunalista =

- Secretary-General: Pierre Poggioli (1987-1989); Alain Orsoni (1989-1990); Jean Biancucci (1990-1992); Marcel Lorenzoni (1992-1996); François Santoni (1996-1998); Charles Pieri (1996-1998)
- Deputy Secretary: Marcel Lorenzoni (1992-1995)
- Founder: Pierre Poggioli
- Founded: June 28, 1987 headquarters = Bastia, Corsica
- Dissolved: 13 June 1998
- Preceded by: Muvimentu Corsu per l'Autodeterminazione (MCA)
- Succeeded by: A Cuncolta Indipendentista (ACI)
- Youth wing: Cunsulta di i Studenti Corsi (1987-1993)
- Armed wing: National Liberation Front of Corsica (1987-1990); FLNC-Canal Historique (1990-1998)
- Ideology: Corsican Nationalism
- Political position: Far-left

A Cuncolta Naziunalista (Corsican for The Nationalist Group), often abbreviated to ACN or CN, was a Corsican political party founded in 1987 by members of the National Liberation Front of Corsica to replace their first political wing, Muvimentu Corsu per l'Autodeterminazione (the Corsican Movement for Self-Determination), which was banned earlier that year. It was led by Charles Pieri and François Santoni from 1990 until 1998, when the party became A Cuncolta Indipendentista (The Independentist Group, led by Charles Pieri). François Santoni would leave the group three months later to make Presenza Naziunale.

ACN was the most radical separatist party of the 1990s, often staging protests and riots against French rule. Their armed wing, the FLNC-Canal Historique (FLNC-Canale Storicu, FLNC-CS) was one of the most active guerrilla forces during the Corsican Years of Lead, a period of intense warfare and division between Corsican nationalists. A Cuncolta Naziunalista would go through a series of reforms to create A Cuncolta Indipendentista in 1998. ACI was formed to strengthen the demands for independence through a series of reforms. FLNC-CS guerrilla leader and ACI leader François Santoni left both organizations in 1998 due to a variety of disagreements. Santoni would go on to found Armata Corsa, an extremist paramilitary organization responsible for a number of attacks and assassinations in Corsica, and its political wing, Presenza Naziunale.

== Electoral history ==
Corsican Assembly
Election	Seats	Alliance seats
1987	3 / 61	6 / 61(ACN-UPC)
1992	3 / 51	9 / 51 (CN)
1998 (annulled)	4 / 51	5 / 51(CN)
