= Corsican Workers' Trade Union =

Trade union of France

Founded in the mid-1980s, the Corsican Workers’ Trade Union (STC, Syndicat des Travailleurs Corses), an offshoot of the island's nationalist movement, quickly became the island's most popular organization for workers on the island. Besides agitating for the economic agenda one would expect of a labour union the STC has an agenda pushing for greater cultural autonomy from France.

== Strikes against SNCM ==
In late February 2004, the STC declared a campaign on the state owned maritime transport firm National Corsican Mediterranean Company (Société Nationale Corse Méditerranée, SNCM). STC demanded that the company, which provides a great deal of the sea borne transport to and from the island, hire more Corsicans as well as raise their wages. An initial compromise was reached at the time, but a court struck it down on grounds of discrimination.

STC renewed their effort September 3 of that year, much to the chagrin of the financially destitute company. The strike was brought to a close September 19 with SCNM agreeing to, "Rebalance the numbers of new crew members recruited in Corsica and in other regions, using equal competence criteria and within the normal parameters of the company’s recruitment" in addition to 'island resident' bonuses for Corsican employees. It is likely SCNM was motivated to compromise by competition from Corsica Ferries, a Swiss company that, nevertheless, is headquartered in Bastia and has "A management structure comprised of young Corsicans". Although employing only 290 islanders, as opposed to SCNM's 816, Corsica Ferries had a bill of 50 million euros and was a likely contributor to SCNM's 11% decline in profits from Corsican services between 1996 and 2003 (72% to 61%).

The agreement served to highlight the tensions between STC and the mainland General Confederation of Labour (Confédération générale du travail, CGT). SNCM ships were blockaded for four days as a protest against what mainland unions feel is a political agenda, namely Corsican nationalism that threatens French principles of non-discrimination. The French government, however, ruled the compromise, "Does not infringe the principle of non-discrimination in employment" and the Corsican CGT branch joined local business and political leaders in what they saw as an important step against the disparity in Corsican employees in a business receiving substantial subsidies from the Corsican regional authority.

By 2005 SCNM was in even worse financial condition. When plans for a Butler Capital Partners of the firm were announced sometimes violent STC protests erupted in Bastia (there were protests in Marseille as well, but these were not affiliated with STC but the CGT). Commandos were brought in to recapture the Pasquale Paoli, an SCNM ship hijacked in Marseille by 30 STC members, when it attempted to enter the Bastia port. An investigation into "hijacking a ship" was launched, if found guilty the ring leaders may be faced with 30 years in prison. More demonstrators attempted to seal the port and stop two ships from leaving. They clashed violently with riot police for four hours injuring a photographer before the ships were free to leave.

Contrary to the earlier disagreement with SCNM, the STC and the CGT were united in their condemnation of the privatization plans; "The government bears the entire responsibility for the conflict... The workers are raising their heads and have decided to fight against the consequences of intensive liberalism" read the joint statement released by France's main trade unions who were joined by the French Socialist Party in their condemnation of the military response to the strikes.

== Sources ==
- https://web.archive.org/web/20041026155357/http://www.eiro.eurofound.eu.int/2004/10/inbrief/fr0410102n.html
- https://web.archive.org/web/20060214150551/http://www.redflag.org.uk/frontline/twelve/12corsica.html
- http://www.turkishpress.com/news.asp?id=72448
