= Pierre Poggioli =

- Petru Poggioli

Member of the Direzione for Bastia
- In office 5 May 1976 – June 1979
- Preceded by: Position established
- Succeeded by: Position abolished

Member of the Cunsigliu for Bastia
- Assuming office June 1979
- Succeeding: Position vacated

President of the Corsican National Alliance
- In office 24 October 1989 – 1 February 2009
- Preceded by: Position established
- Succeeded by: Position abolished

Leader of Resistenza
- In office September 1990 – May 2003
- Preceded by: Position established
- Succeeded by: Position abolished

Territorial councillor in the Corsican Assembly
- In office 12 August 1984 – 15 March 1998

Personal details
- Born: 6 February 1950 (age 76) Corte, Corsica, France
- Party: Muvimentu Corsu per l'Autodeterminazione (1983–1987) A Cuncolta Naziunalista (1987–1989) Corsican National Alliance (1989–2009)
- Education: Université Nice-Sophia-Antipolis (maîtrise) (1975) University of Corsica Pasquale Paoli (master) (2007) Institut d'études politiques d'Aix-en-Provence (doctorat) (2011)

Pierre Poggioli (Corsican: Petru Poggioli; born 6 February 1950) is a Corsican politician, author, and former guerrilla leader who served as founder and leading member of the Corsican National Liberation Front and as president of its political wing, the Corsican Movement for Self-Determination. During the 1988–1990 FLNC split, Poggioli left the FLNC and created Resistenza, a new armed organization, and its political wing, the Corsican National Alliance. Poggioli served as head of Resistenza and the ANC until their dissolutions in 2003 and 2009 respectively.
