= Union of the Corsican People =

Political party

The Union of the Corsican People (Corsican: Unione di u Populu Corsu, UPC) was a political party in Corsica, France, founded by Max Simeoni on July 4, 1977, which represented the branch of Corsican nationalism favouring self-government. The UPC condemned all violence, notably that of the National Liberation Front of Corsica (FLNC).

In the 1982 regional elections in Corsica, the UPC won 10.61% of the votes and seven seats, but two years later it won just 5.21% and three seats. In the 1989 European election, the UPC obtained one Member of the European Parliament, Max Simeoni, running as part of the Green list headed by Antoine Waechter. The UPC was led notably by François Alfonsi, currently a Member of the European Parliament. In 2002 the UCP came to an end, merged into the new Party of the Corsican Nation (PNC).
