= Aleria standoff =

1975 standoff between Corsican militants and French Gendarmerie

- Part of Prelude to the Corsican conflict
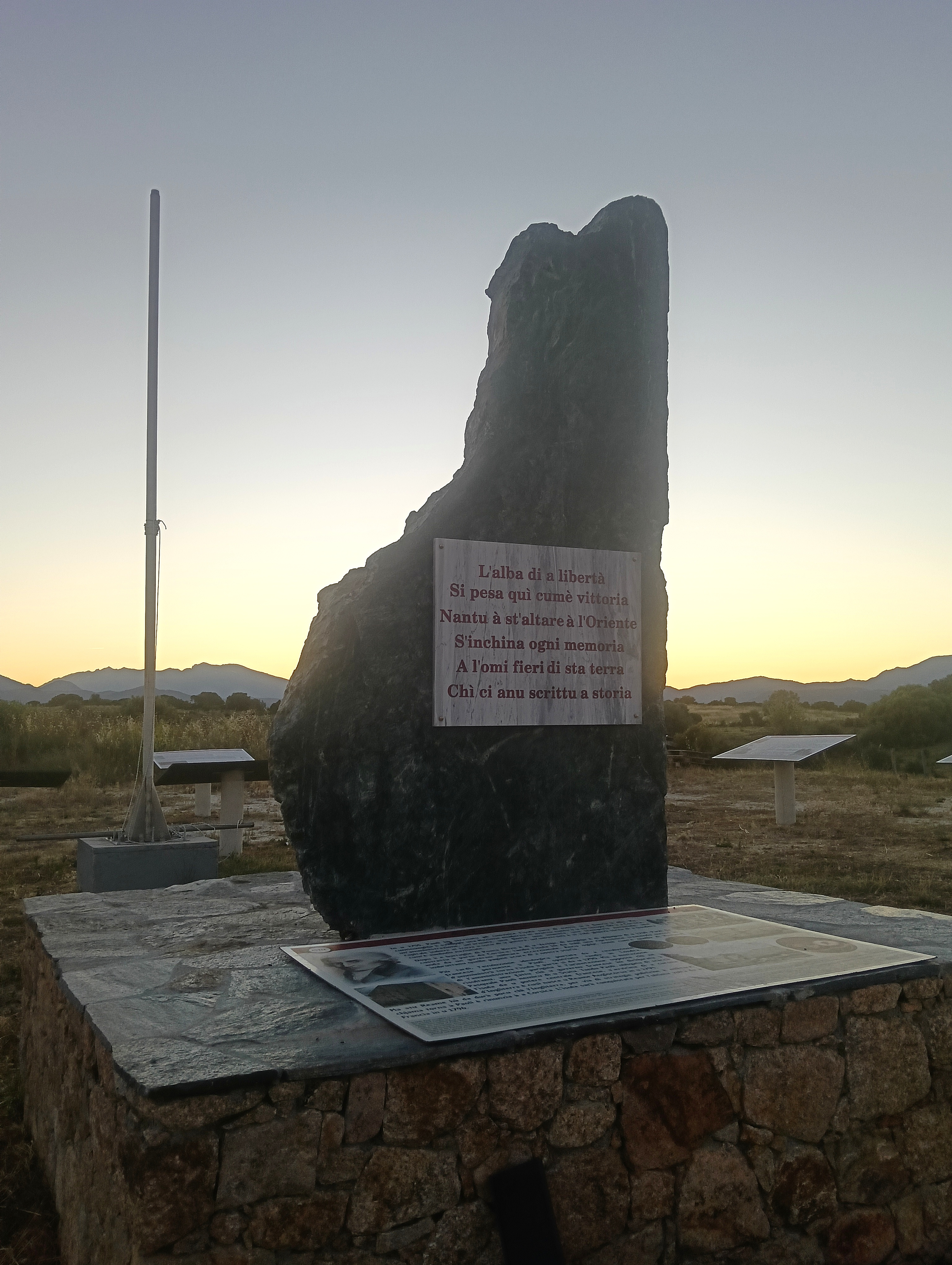
- Aleria standoff memorial
Date	21–22 August 1975
Location	Aleria, Corsica event 42°07′57″N 09°30′34″E
Result	See Consequences

Belligerents
Azzione per la Rinascita Corsa	(France) French Gendarmerie

Commanders and leaders
Edmond Simeoni	Michel Poniatowski

Strength
30 militants	1,200 gendarms 8 armoured vehicles 8 helicopters

Casualties and losses
1 wounded	2 killed
- Location within France

The Aleria standoff was a confrontation between members of the French Gendarmerie and Corsican nationalist militants who entrenched themselves in a wine cellar at Aleria, Corsica, on 21 and 22 August 1975. The armed activists belonged to the radical nationalist party Action Régionaliste Corse (ARC). The occupation resulted in a strong reaction of the French government and is regarded as the precursor of the Corsican conflict.

== Background ==
The roots of the modern Corsican conflict can be traced to the assignment by the French public corporation SOMIVAC (Société pour la mise en valeur de la Corse) of fertile lands in the eastern part of the island to pied-noir farmers since 1957. The process of chaptalization and adulteration in the production of wine by these plantations drove down the quality of Corsican wines, and led to a boycott in mainland France's markets. Corsican nationalists stood by the small wine producers of the island, financially damaged by both the sanctions and the unfair competition.

Another major crisis erupted in 1972 when waste disposal activities by the Italian chemical company Montedison in the Tyrrhenian Sea put the Corsican fishing industry at risk. Demonstrations took place at the capital of Corsica, Ajaccio, supported by leftist and nationalist activists, among them the Action Regionaliste Corse (ARC), a nationalist organization established in 1967 and led by Edmond Simeoni, a physician and activist from Bastia. On 15 September 1973, another militant group, the Front Paysan Corse de Liberation (FPCL), carried out a bomb attack in Italian waters against one of the waste-disposal vessels used by Montedison at Follonica Bay, the Scarlino Secondo, using a zodiac boat. An Italian court at Livorno eventually declared Montedison's toxic waste disposal illegal on 27 April 1974.

== Standoff ==
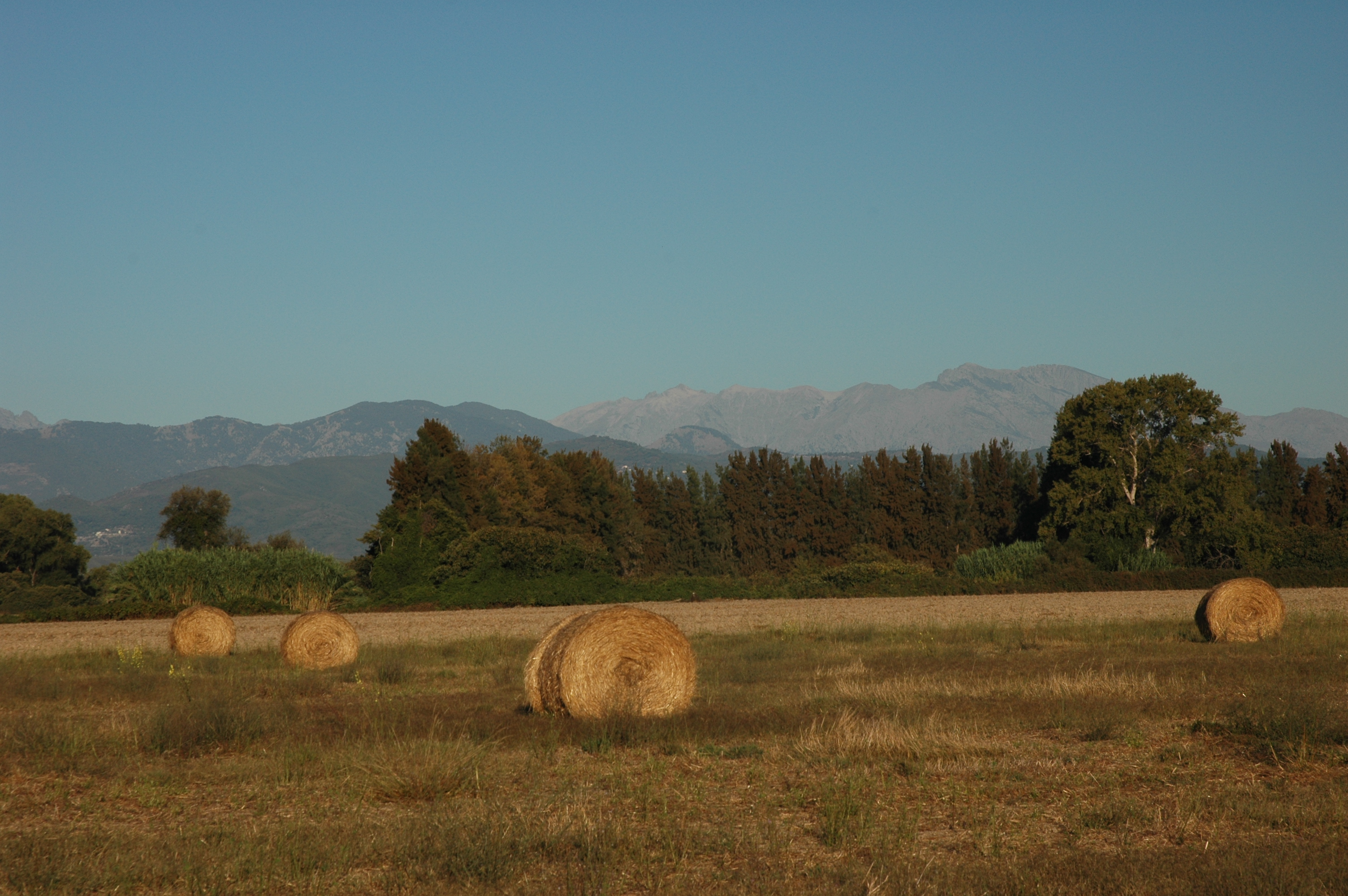
Countryside near the wine cellar where the standoff took place

On 21 August 1975, 30 armed members of the ARC, commanded by Simeoni, occupied the farm of Henry Depeille, a wine producer of pied-noir origin who had benefited from SOMIVAC subsidies, demanding a change of policies. According to the authorities, the militants carried handguns, hunting rifles and even a single automatic rifle, though Simeoni claimed that the group never possessed such a weapon. Fictional accounts suggested that the automatic rifle was actually a MAC 29/24 light machine gun. Media outlets initially reported that several people had been taken hostage. Once he was briefed on the situation in Corsica, the French Ministry of Interior Affairs, Michael Poniatowski, sent in 1,200 gendarmes, eight armored personnel carriers, and eight helicopters. Twelve Transall C-160 transport aircraft gave logistic support, and a frigate from the Marine Nationale was on station off Aleria. The Berliet VXB-170 vehicles were deployed on a rear echelon. The deployment of the personnel carriers was hampered by the lack of protective turrets for the machine gunner. The Puma helicopters flew reconnaissance missions over the compound and were greeted by Simeoni's men fire in a couple of occasions. The rotorcraft were eventually used to ferry reinforcements to the besieging troops.

The assault began at 16:10 on 22 August, when the gendarmes fired rifle-launched tear gas grenades at the complex. The rebels fired back with their hunting rifles. Two gendarmes were shot and killed, while one of the militants lost his right foot to the blast of one of the grenades. Forensic experts later concluded that the fire position from which the dead gendarmes were shot was not within the limits of the Depeille farm compound.

After just three minutes of exchanging fire with the troopers, the militants raised the white flag. Simeoni was seen providing first aid to a wounded gendarme and eventually surrendered voluntarily to the French authorities.

== Consequences ==
After the standoff was over, violent demonstrations erupted in Ajaccio and Bastia. The Gendarmerie intervened with their armored vehicles. On the night of 27 August, another gendarme was killed with a hunting rifle by a sniper in the course of the clashes. The perpetrator was arrested. The ARC was banned by the French government on the same day. Simeoni was sentenced to five years in jail, but he was a free man by 1977. At the time of the trial on Simeoni, on 21 May 1976, a new-borne nationalist organization, the National Liberation Front of Corsica (NLFC) appeared on the scene by launching a series of bomb attacks in Ajaccio, Bastia, Sartène, Porto-Vecchio and other Corsican towns. This bombings marked the beginning of the Corsican conflict.

Several years later, voices from within Corsican nationalism bore criticism on the Aleria incident. Former militant leader François Sargentini claimed that Aleria deepened the division between autonomists and independentists and communist activist Dominique Bucchini said that the incident "worked like a trap", diverting efforts and highlighting excesses, like xenophobia. In the opinion of Emile Zuccarelli, deputy mayor of Bastia in 2005, the incident and its aftermath "slowed down economic development, employment and the improvement of the standard of living in Corsica". In 1987, Simeoni expressed his deep regret for the deaths of the two gendarmes at Aleria.
