= Corsican conflict =

French regional conflict since 1976

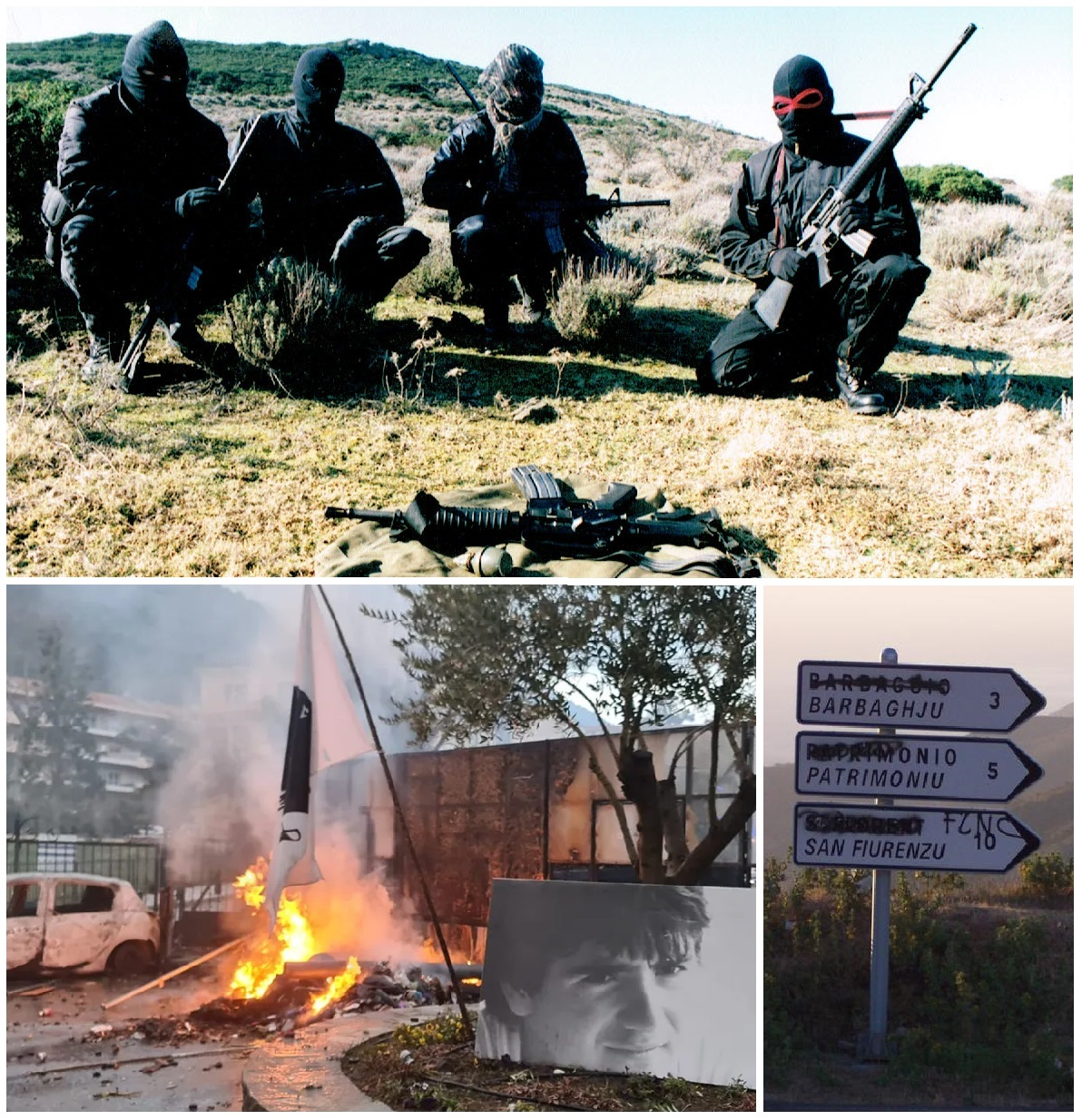
Date	4 May 1976 – 25 June 2016 (40 years, 1 month and 3 weeks); 9 March 2022 – present (4 years, 6 months, 3 weeks and 6 days) (Note: Low-level violence continued intermittently between 2016 and 2022.)
Location	Corsica; Violence occasionally spread to mainland France and Italy
Status	Ongoing

Belligerents
France: French Armed Forces (1 barracks on Corsica); National Gendarmerie; National Police; Municipal Police; Anti-separatist paramilitaries: Front d'Action Nouvelle Contre l'Indépendance et l'Autonomie; Criminal groups: Corsican mafia	(Corsica) Corsican Separatist Paramilitaries National Liberation Front of Corsica (FLNC) (1976-1990); FLNC-Canal Habituel (FLNC-CA) (1990-1997); FLNC-Canal Historique (FLNC-CS) (1990-1999); Resistenza (1990-2003); Fronte Ribellu (1996-1999); FLNC-5 May (FLNC-5M) (1996-1999); Armata Corsa (AC) (1999-2001); FLNC-Union of Combatants (FLNC-UC) (1999-present); FLNC-22 October (FLNC-22U) (2002-present); Armata di U Populu Corsu (APC) (2004-2006); FLNC-1976 (2007-present); FLNC-May 21 (FLNC-M21) (2021-2024); Other small groups

Commanders and leaders
(France) Valéry Giscard d'Estaing (France) François Mitterrand (France) Jacques Chirac (France) Nicolas Sarkozy (France) François Hollande (France) Emmanuel Macron (France) Jean-Pierre Massimi X (France) Claude Érignac X	Edmond Simeoni; Léo Battesti; Alain Orsoni X Jean-Michel Rossi X Charles Pieri; François Santoni X Natale Luciani; Paul-Felix Benedetti (allegedly); Stephane Ori (allegedly)

Strength
2,800+ Police and Gendarmeries, and 1,300 Soldiers (of the FFL, by Calvi)	Unknown, likely between hundreds or thousands of direct members depending on the group

Casualties and losses
14 killed	Several arrested
- +140 deaths

The Corsican conflict (Corsican: Conflittu Corsu; French: Conflit Corse) is an armed and territorial conflict on the island of Corsica which began in 1976 between the government of France and Corsican nationalist militant groups, mainly the National Liberation Front of Corsica (Fronte di Liberazione Naziunale di a Corsica, FLNC) and factions of the group. Beginning in the 1970s, the Corsican conflict peaked in the 1980s before Corsican nationalist groups and the French government reached a truce with one of the two main splinters of the FLNC, the FLNC-Union of Combatants (FLNC-Unione di i Cumbattenti, FLNC-UC) in June 2014. In 2016, the other main splinter, the FLNC-22nd of October (FLNC-22 Uttrovi, FLNC-22U) also declared a truce. It is currently ongoing following the 2022 Corsica unrest and the return to arms of the FLNC-UC and FLNC-22U.

== 1970s: "Drawing Attention to Corsica" ==
On the night of 4 May 1976, 21 bombs exploded targeting French infrastructure and businesses in the cities of Ajaccio, Bastia, Porto-Vecchio, Corte, Biguglia, Sartène, Francardo, and Ghisonaccia, as well as Marseille and Nice on the French mainland. The next day these attacks were claimed through an anonymous phone call and fliers were left on the streets of Ajaccio titled "The Manifesto of 5 May". These attacks were claimed by a new armed group, formed from the unification of two already existing militant groups, the Fronte Paesanu Corsu per a Liberazione, and Ghjustizia Paolina. the group called themselves the "National Liberation Front of Corsica (FLNC)", likely named after the group of the same name in Algeria. The FLNC then began a harsh guerrilla campaign against the French government in Corsica, consisting of bombings, ambushes, robbery, kidnappings, and assassinations. the FLNC launched another series of bomb attacks across the island on 20 May.

The series of attacks and the emergence of the FLNC coincided with the trial of ten members of the recently outlawed Azzione Regiunalista Corsa (ARC). The men had been involved in the shooting dead of two French gendarmerie officers during a stand-off in a wine cellar at Aleria on 22 August 1975, involving a dozen armed militants led by local lawyer Edmond Simeoni. One member of the ARC lost a foot in the action when a gendarme fired a rifle grenade.

During the summer of 1976 the FLNC became more active, and on the night of 17 July it carried out a fresh wave of attacks which included a rocket and mortar attack on the gendarmerie in Aghione, which involved the use of an American M79 grenade launcher. This increased speculation that the FLNC were being supplied by Libya, who were at the time supplying other revolutionary groups in Europe, including the Provisional IRA.

In September 1976 the FLNC were attempting assassinations of high-ranking French military officials in the French Foreign Legion, which had been stationed in Corsica since the end of the Algerian War and had been used in the Corsican conflict as military police. In separate incidents in the town of Corte, a general narrowly missed assassination when his car was riddled with bullets; his driver lost an ear in the attack. Meanwhile, the home of another senior officer in the town was targeted in a bomb attack. This was in response to the killing of two Corsican shepherds by the Foreign Legion, which sparked mass unrest. On 7 September, seven masked militiamen hijacked and bombed a Boeing 707 parked at Ajaccio's airport.

The beginning of 1977 saw little FLNC activity. In April there were a number of attacks on premises associated with Corsican nationalists and the FLNC. The attacks were claimed by a new group calling itself FRANCIA (Front d'Action Nouvelle Contre l'Indépendance et l'Autonomie). Although other anti-separatist groups existed in Corsica, FRANCIA appeared to be the only group capable of carrying out actual attacks. On 14 May this group destroyed the printing presses of Arritti (a Corsican nationalist publication) in a bomb attack. The FLNC responded to the attacks on 24 May by carrying out a daring raid on the French army outpost at Fort-Lacroix, near Bastia, where eight armed militants blew up wireless facilities after subduing the sentries. At the beginning of June they destroyed a large section of Bastia railway station in a bomb attack; a month later the FLNC launched an overnight bomb offensive hitting 27 French targets followed by the bombing of the television relay station at Serra di Pigno. On the night of 13 January 1978, nine armed militiamen wearing balaclavas stormed and bombed the French air base at Solenzara using 40 kg of explosives, in the so-called "Operation Zara".

The FLNC suffered a serious setback in May 1978 when 27 suspected members were arrested both in Corsica and France. The police stumbled upon an FLNC weapons-dump in the town of Cardo during an investigation into an ordinary burglary. While at the scene the police noticed men nearby moving what looked like weapons. The incident resulted in over 300 people being questioned and more than 60 detained by the authorities. Other suspects were picked up in Paris, Nice and Lyons. In December 1978 the FLNC increased its attacks on police barracks – in one incident the gendarmerie base at Borgo was raked with heavy machine gun fire – resulting in a fear that the FLNC would now begin to concentrate its attacks on people as well as material targets. At this time the FLNC also began to demand that their prisoners be treated as political prisoners.

== 1980s: "A New Offensive" ==
In 1979 the number of FLNC attacks increased; in a two-month period from January to the beginning of March there were over 115 bomb attacks on the island. On 11 March 1979, the FLNC carried out 32 bomb attacks simultaneously targeting banks and financial institutions on the island. However, in July a number of their members were captured and sentenced to long prison terms resulting in a lack of action or activity on the part of the FLNC. The Front announced it would now launch a "new offensive in the liberation struggle" and advised Corsicans who were members of the police or Army to leave the island. On 10 March, ten banks across Corsica were car-bombed by the FLNC. Then on 10 April three banks in Paris were also damaged in explosions, and later the Paris Law Courts were devastated by a time-bomb which cost over 3 million francs worth of damage. The late 1970s and early 1980s marked a decisive change of FLNC policy, similar to the one employed by the Provisional IRA. The FLNC now decided to "Bring the Corsican problem to the French" by carrying out bomb attacks on the French mainland. On 6 May 1979 the FLNC managed to bomb 20 banks in Paris and on 30 May more banks were damaged by explosions. The beginning of June saw the FLNC switch back to activities on the island itself with twenty-five major explosions coupled with a car bomb attack on the Police Headquarters in Paris. On 14 May 1980 the FLNC bombed the Law Courts in Paris and also carried out a machine-gun attack on four gendarmes who were guarding the Iranian embassy, wounding three.

The year of 1980 also saw FLNC supporters becoming more visible in terms of protests and political activity. The FLNC continued to call for their prisoners to be given political status. Mass demonstrations in support of political status for Corsican prisoners were common and FLNC supporters were active in all protests which could be classified as "Corsican V French". In November 1980, 12 FLNC prisoners in Paris went on hunger-strike in a protest against the inequality of treatment for Corsican nationalist prisoners. This protest overlapped with that of six IRA hunger strikers in Northern Ireland. The Corsican prisoners were force-fed for a number of weeks before they ended their strike. On 1 April 1981 the FLNC called a ceasefire for the duration of the Presidential Elections and following the victory of François Mitterrand, announced they would extend the ceasefire to "see how things develop". Following this, the FLNC began extensive talks with the Mitterrand government, resulting in the creation of the Corsican Assembly and the establishment of a university on the island. The University would open the next year.

On 18 September the FLNC announced the end of its ceasefire at a press conference held in the mountains of central Corsica. They condemned the autonomists for attempting to use the "usual useless channels" of the political system and opposed French "appeasement policies" before stating that the armed struggle would resume and that the FLNC would not lay down its arms.

On 11 March 1982 the FLNC carried out 25 bombings across the island. This attacks followed the armed assault on 11 February on a recreation centre of the French Foreign Legion by FLNC militants in the area of Sorbo-Ocognano, where Corporal First Class Renato Rossi was killed and legionnaire Maurice Steinte wounded.

On 19 August 1982 the FLNC launched its most spectacular blue night with the so-called "violente nuit bleue", during which 99 attacks were carried out against government targets.

In 1983, the FLNC began a campaign against the Mafia, most notably the southern Valinco gang. On 17 June, FLNC brigade leader Guy Orsoni, brother of the later FLNC-Canal Habituel leader Alain Orsoni, is kidnapped and murdered by Mafiosi associated with the Valinco gang. It is alleged that the Valinco gang had a series of backroom dealings with French authorities in order to kill Guy Orsoni. The FLNC, during a press conference, cites the inability and supposed unwillingness of French authorities to catch the perpetrators as evidence of a conspiracy. By the end of 1983, the Valinco gang leader and two of his children had been targets of assassinations, and a third had fled to Miami, Florida.

In the mid-1980s the organisation also stepped up its attacks against suspected drug dealers, killing four in the space of twelve months in 1986.

In May 1988, after a period of intense guerrilla warfare (392 attacks in 1985, 522 attacks in 1986, and a likely similar number in 1987) a truce was agreed between the French government and the FLNC. However, the ceasefire did not sit well with certain members of the organisation, resulting in a split within the movement. The so-called "Habituels" remained pro-ceasefire, advocating for a political agreement to autonomy. The "Historiques", however, maintained a stance of armed struggle in order to gain total independence from France. The split led to a violent three-sided guerrilla war between the Historiques, Habituels, and the French government.

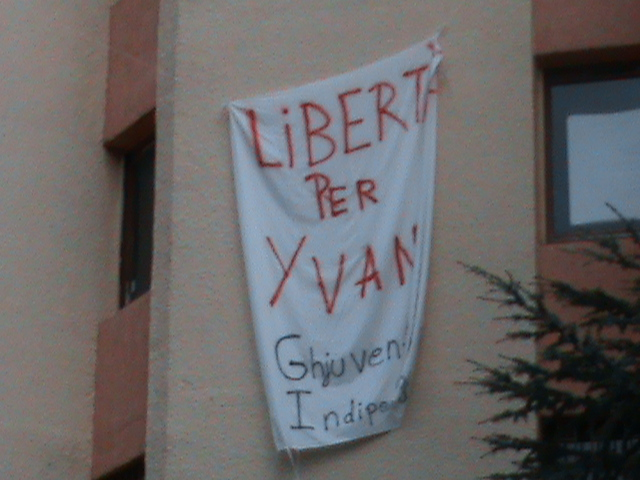
A banner erected by members of Ghjuventù Indipendentista calling for the release of Yvan Colonna. Many banners and graffiti, in and around University of Corsica Pascal Paoli in Corte, appeared showing support for the FLNC and Corsican independence.

== 1990s: Internal feuds and the assassination of Claude Érignac ==
The 1990s saw the FLNC organisation tear itself apart through a series of deadly internal feuds. Much of the reason for the splits and feuds was the political rivalries of the members within the organisation as well as personal disputes. In 1990, The FLNC officially split into two organizations, the FLNC-Canal Habituel (Canale Abituale, FLNC-CA) and the FLNC-Canal Historique (Canale Storicu, FLNC-CS). Other anti-ceasefire activists from the FLNC created a new militant group, Resistenza. These three groups would be the main armed forces opposing French rule in Corsica in the early 90s. Another Group, the National Liberation Army of Corsica (Armata di Liberazione Naziunale di a Corsica, ALNC) became active in 1989-1990, but joined the FLNC-CS after a brief armed campaign. Meanwhile, other small groups such as the radical anti-drug and anti-mafia "A Droga Basta" began to form, carrying out attacks and guerrilla campaigns that typically got overshadowed by the sheer scale of the FLNC's.

In January 1991 the FLNC-CS struck closer to the heart of the government with the kidnapping of the head of the Corsican Economic Commission, Aurélien Garcia. Garcia was placed on a terminal in Ajaccio to be directed back to Paris.

On 3 January 1991, François Mitterrand and the French Communist Party began an inquiry into the political violence in Corsica after the assassination of multiple high-ranking officials in the years of 1989-1991. By the end of the inquiry, a new prefect, hardline French unionist Bernard Bonnet was placed in charge of Corsica. The government of Bonnet is regarded by many to have been corrupt and dictatorial, and he is the only French prefect in history to be removed from office following an affair in which two businesses are burned down via his orders and blamed on separatist guerrillas.

On 8 January 1991, the FLNC-CA reaffirmed their halt on military actions against the French government as the leadership took a turn to combat the ongoing civil war within the FLNC. In March, the FLNC-CA affirmed this position via a conference in which many members attended. This caused a rift within the FLNC-CA, as many members, rallying around Habituel Léo Battesti, wanted to dissolve the FLNC-Canal Habituel and stop the violence entirely.

1991 saw the first major actions by Resistenza, a group which had existed in some form since 1989 when it split from the FLNC. In January 1991, Resistenza committed five bomb attacks targeting departmental government buildings in the two Corsican departments. Also in January, a Resistenza attack was committed against a housing complex in Sagone. On 31 March Resistenza committed a large-scale bombing operation in Porticcio in protest of the French Senate's opposition to a proposed reform law that recognizes a Corsican people. On 5 April, more housing complexes in Corsica were bombed, this time across the far south. A month later, a winery in Linguizzetta was invaded to show support for striking farmers. On 14 May, 10 people were arrested in Ghisonaccia due to an alleged connection with a Resistenza action in the town. On 1 June, A Resistenza attack blew up a hotel in Bonifacio. On 19 August, Resistenza bombed a Police station in Bastia. In September, a conference was held where Resistenza announced "a toughening of armed struggle." Soon after, rural areas and campsites were the target of commando operations and invasions by Resistenza, and eventually it had become a guerrilla group similar in nature to the FLNC splinters.

In July 1991, an FLNC-CS commando bombed an oil refinery in Sardinia to protest the passage of oil tankers through the Strait of Bonifacio. The same month, the FLNC-CS bombs the departmental directorates in Bastia and Ajaccio as well as the national ministry of education. These attacks are followed by an announcement where the FLNC-CS leadership discusses a "strengthening of actions". In September, the FLNC bombed academic rectorates in the Paris area, particularly Arcueil and Créteil. November 1991 saw one of the first shootouts between the FLNC-CS and military gendarmes when an FLNC-CS commando managed to shoot its way out of an ambush and escape.

In 1992, the civil war amongst the descendants of the FLNC intensified. On 9 January, Jean-Dominique Rossi, an FLNC-CS member, was shot dead by members of the FLNC-CA just minutes after he left a meeting held to support him. On 15 June An FLNC-CA member is the target of an attempted assassination, and his furniture store is racked with machine gun fire. An FLNC-CS member named Jean-Michel Emmanuelli was the target of an attempted assassination a day later. On 1 August, an FLNC-CS member named Bruno DeGiovanni is killed by FLNC-CA members in Corte. On 14 December, multiple FLNC-CA members across the Balagne region (Calvi, L'Île-Rousse, Lumio, Calenzana, Pigna, etc.) are targets of FLNC-CS attacks.

The FLNC-CS continued both major and minor attacks against the state in 1992. In March 1992 a deputy of the National Assembly from Haute-Corse's First Constituency is the victim of an FLNC-CS carbombing. On 25 May, the Communist mayor of Sartène, Dominique Bucchini speaks out against violence in Corsica, and is the target of an attack only a week later. On 26 July, members of Resistenza, under the guise of photographers, hijacked a helicopter and forced the pilot to land on the island of Cavallo, where they bombed a luxury apartment complex which the nationalists denounced as belonging to the "mafia".

On 1 August 1992, the FLNC-CA holds a meeting in an occupied area outside of the town of Corte, where they announce that they will be escalating the war with the mafia if they further attempt to cement themselves into positions of power. At the same time, the FLNC-CS has been going on a spree of kidnapping and murder of mafia officials throughout the year.

On 11 August another helicopter-borne action took place, this time apparently carried out by the FLNC-CS. A group of armed men hijacked a helicopter owned by the Heliscope Company and landed on the end of an airstrip of Bastia airport, blocking the path of an Air Inter cargo aircraft that was about to depart for Marseille with French and foreign currency. The gunmen escaped on the helicopter with a 10 million francs bounty. The same month, an armoured transport carrying the payment for the Legion was ambushed at Ponte Leccia by a group armed with a rocket launcher. The heist resulted in a 5 million francs bounty. On 20 September, the town hall of Zonza came under attack, and a gendarme patrolling the area was shot and killed. In November 1992 the Council of State in Paris is bombed by the FLNC-CS.

In December 1996 the FLNC began a Christmas offensive across Corsica. In Figari the FLNC launched a machine-gun attack on military barracks there while in Zicavo a grenade attack was carried out on the Police Station. In 1997 the FLNC-Canal Habituel faction called a ceasefire which resulted in the Canal Historique faction attempting to take control of the organisation and launch a fresh offensive. In 1998 FLNC attacks soared with policemen and mayors among the dead. The offensive culminated in the assassination of Claude Érignac in Ajaccio. Érignac was the Prefect of Corsica and the top representative of the Fifth French Republic on the island. The attack was highly publicized and criticized so strongly by the locals that the FLNC were forced to deny that they were responsible, while consensus for independence reached an all-time low among the population (6%). In 1999, following a period of personal disputes, the southern leader of the FLNC-CS, François Santoni, left the northern leader Charles Pieri and created his own organisation, Armata Corsa. Many of the feuding factions, who had issues with Santoni, came together to combat the rapidly growing Armata Corsa and formed the FLNC-Union of Combattants (FLNC-UC). By 2001, Armata Corsa had been driven out and Santoni was shot dead by a mafioso in the town of Monacia-d'Aullène.

== 2000s: "Reunification of the Internal Factions" ==
The FLNC has continued its attacks into the 2000s, although at a much reduced tempo when compared with the late 1970s. Many FLNC bombs failed to detonate or attacks had to be aborted. Nevertheless, the FLNC did manage to carry out a number of successful attacks including the 2002 bombing of a military barracks in Lumio which injured a number of gendarmes, bomb attacks against a number of hotels in Marseille in 2004 and rocket attacks against a number of barracks in 2007.

In 2009 it carried out a car bomb attack against a gendarmerie barracks in Vescovato. During the early 2000s the FLNC had been divided into the FLNC-UC, the FLNC-1976, and the FLNC-22 October.

The FLNC continued its attacks against the properties of French mainlanders living on Corsica. At the end of 2011 the group released a statement in which it claimed responsibility for 38 bomb attacks in the preceding 4 months. In the statement the armed group said they "would remain attentive and never let pass an opportunity for peace."

== 2010s: Cessation of hostilities and minor incidents ==
In June 2014, the FLNC-UC announced the cessation of the armed struggle, stating that the Front has "decided to engage unilaterally in a process of demilitarisation and a progressive exit from clandestinity." On 3 May 2016, the FLNC-22 announced that they will "end military operations" by October 2016, following the lead of the FLNC-UC, in order to allow the island's new assembly, led by nationalists, "to fulfil its mandate calmly". In July 2016, FLNC-22 warned of a "determined response, without any qualms" for any jihadist attack in Corsica.

Despite the official cessation of hostilities in 2014, a number of attacks took place in the 2010s, most likely conducted by small splinter groups. On 15 October 2016, riots erupted in Bastia over the conviction of three nationalists for a bomb attack in 2012. Molotov cocktails and projectiles were thrown at police. In March 2019, prior to President Emmanuel Macron visiting Corsica on 4 April, two villas were bombed without any injuries. Then, just three days before the arrival of President Emmanuel Macron, two homemade explosive devices were found in front of government buildings in Bastia. At the end of September 2019, a group of Corsican nationalists, one of which was armed, announced the revival of the FLNC in a video message. The group threatened to attack property of foreign investors, and demanded that selling land to non-Corsicans should be prohibited. Yet again, on 14 July 2020, a group of four armed militants held a public speech in a village 50 kilometres from Bastia. The group claimed a shooting incident at the Montesoro Gendarmerie in Bastia and left a leaflet demanding mandatory Corsican language education beginning in kindergarten and limitation of tourists to twice the island's population during busy months.

== 2022: Murder of Yvan Colonna and unrest ==
Riots erupted across Corsica after Yvan Colonna was attacked in prison on 2 March 2022. Colonna died of his injuries on 21 March. The courthouse at Ajaccio was assaulted by a crowd, which attempted to set it on fire. Stones and flares were thrown at gendarmes. In Bastia and Calvi, the rioters attacked the police with petrol bombs, home-made bombs and slingshots; the anti-riot squad responded with tear gas. Prosecutors reported 102 people wounded, 77 of them policemen. In April, a number of villas were burned to the ground in Canale-di-Verde, Ghisonaccia, Pianottoli-Caldarello, and Conca. The FLNC said in a statement that the group supports the protest and hints it could resume their operations.

Antisemitic and anti-French graffiti appeared with FLNC being reportedly responsible.

== Armed groups ==
- List of armed factions in the Corsican conflict

== See also ==
- The Troubles – United Kingdom and Ireland
- Basque conflict – Basque Country, Spain
- Insurgency in Aceh – Aceh, Indonesia
