= FLNC-Union of Combatants =

National Liberation Front of Corsica - Union of Combatants
- Fronte di Liberazione Naziunale di a Corsica - Unione di i Cumbattenti
- Founded: 23 December 1999 (27 years ago)
- Dates active: 1999-present (disarmed from 2014 to 2023)
- Merger of: FLNC-Canal Historique; Fronte Ribellu; FLNC-5 May; Clandestinu; Resistenza Corsa (since 2003)
- Split to: FLNC-22 October
- Active regions: Corsica and mainland France
- Ideology: Corsican nationalism Environmentalism; Agrarianism; Anti-capitalism
- Political position: Big tent
- Status: Active
- Wars: Corsican conflict

The National Liberation Front of Corsica - Union of Combatants (Corsican: Fronte di Liberazione Naziunale di a Corsica - Unione di i Cumbattenti; abbreviated FLNC-UC) is a Corsican nationalist paramilitary and guerrilla organisation.

The FLNC-UC formed in December 1999 following a merger of five Corsican nationalist armed groups: the FLNC-Canal Historique, the FLNC-5 May, Fronte Ribellu, and Clandestinu. These groups were in constant conflict with each other during the period of the Corsican conflict known as the "Fratricidal War" or "Years of Lead" until the Migliacciaru Accords of March 1999. Resistenza Corsa joined as its fifth and final merger in August 2003. The FLNC-UC, with the exception of a brief period of negotiations in the early 2000s resulting in the Matignon Accords, waged a continuous guerrilla war on French authorities until 2014, when the FLNC-UC officially disarmed amidst promises of negotiations by the government in Paris.

Throughout most of its early existence, the FLNC-UC also fought a feud with the FLNC-22 October, a group created in 2002 to protest what they perceived as the FLNC-UC's inaction. This continued, with an exception from 2009 to 2012 in which the two groups unified, until the two entered an alliance in 2021. In August 2026, these groups turned antagonistic towards each other again following an FLNC-UC press conference in which the group denounced the "community of destiny" doctrine, a doctrine written in the 1980s by the original FLNC which states that anyone in Corsica, regardless of national origin, could adopt Corsican language and culture and thus be considered Corsican.

The FLNC-UC holds many of the same goals as the original FLNC and its other successors, most notably the violent overthrow of French rule in Corsica and the establishment of an independent Corsican state. The FLNC-UC also holds environmentalist and agrarian philosophies, a pillar of Corsican nationalist movements since the 1970s, outlined in the 1980s by the FLNC's "defence of the land" doctrine. Nazione (called Corsica Libera until 2024) is considered to be the FLNC-UC's political wing.

== History ==
=== Origins ===
Corsica was annexed by the Kingdom of France in 1769 following an invasion of Pasquale Paoli's Corsican Republic, which had recently been established following the Corsican War of Independence. Corsican nationalists launched multiple rebellions in the years following this, but none were particularly successful with the exception of a British-supported revolt in 1794 resulting in the creation of the Anglo-Corsican Kingdom.

Corsicans have, for most of their history under French rule, felt alienated from the French mainland due to geography, language, and customs. From the introduction of French rule, Corsican government institutions had largely been run by small, local families of politicians called “clans”. The early French governments tolerated the clans, preferring to leave Corsica's governance to the Corsicans. French officials in Corsica like the prefect were sidelined on the island, and the goal of the prefect was to stay out of Corsican politics most of the time, only providing insight or guidelines to the French government in Paris. Under Napoleon III, The French cabinet had begun a policy of appointing a Corsican deputy minister, and for most of the French Third Republic that minister was Emmanuel Arène. Known to the locals as “u re Manuele” (the king Emmanuel), who attempted to create a system of clanism where Corsican politicians would be more open to French authority. Regardless of his attempt, real power in Corsica remained with the local Conseil Général and the mayors, who often acted in their own interests and were hostile, sometimes even physically violent, to French authorities such as the prefect and the deputies.

By the 1900s, Corsica was slowly being brought into the sphere of metropolitan France. Large migrations, industrialization, and government subsidies allowed short-term economic growth in Corsica, causing many locals to adopt pro-French sentiment, not due to a shared national identity, but rather due to the economic growth from being a French territory. This was strengthened by the tragedy of World War I, which allowed Corsica and mainland France to share a sense of solidarity and pride due to the men from Corsica who fought in the war. Following the war, many Corsicans became worried over the growing threat of Mussolini’s Italian Irredentism, as Corsica was included in the claims of many Italian irredentists. After the outbreak of World War II, many Corsicans saw the war with Germany on the mainland as mostly irrelevant, fearing a possible Italian invasion more than a German one. Many Corsicans, despite the wish to remain French, largely still didn’t feel a national connection to mainland France due to a separate linguistic, historical, and cultural identity. Upon the fall of France in 1940, the new Vichy government made defending Corsica from the Italian threat a priority. Despite the insistence of French unity by Corsican citizens, many were only supportive of a French government to reject Italian sovereignty. Corsican prefect Paul Balley stated: “a Corsican who claims to be French is demonstrating not so much loyalty to France as rejection of Italy”.

Corsicans under the Fourth Republic were largely supportive of Charles de Gaulle, seeking economic interests from him. During the Algerian War and other colonial conflicts of the 1960s, Corsicans were drafted heavily, making up 22 percent of French colonial forces despite only being around 1% of all French citizens. This was done to bind Corsica to France through military service, though it also created a small sense of disdain amongst Corsicans. “Operation Corse”, an invasion of Corsica by soldiers attempting to reinstate de Gaulle into power, was supported by many Corsicans, and resistance to the landings were next to none. Despite this, de Gaulle's administration during the Fifth Republic caused relations between Corsicans and France to sour greatly. De Gaulle's opposition to regionalism and the establishment of a “strong state” caused Corsicans, who had been enjoyed Corsican self-government for the longest time, to feel betrayed by de Gaulle. This led to the slow adoption of armed struggle in Corsica.

Two major turning points in Corsican nationalist history occurred in the early 1970s. The first, the Red Mud Affair, was a series of grassroots actions and riots against the French government for their indifference to the dumping of waste by Italian company Montedison into Corsican waters. The second, the Aleria standoff, occurred in 1975. Corsican militants of by the paramilitary Corsican Regionalist Action, headed by brothers Max Simeoni and Edmund Simeoni, stormed a wine cellar in the town of Aleria and got held off by the French gendarmerie, resulting in the deaths of 2 gendarmes and the serious wounding of an ARC militant. These events inspired even further militaristic ideology within the Corsican nationalist movement, culminating with the creation of the National Liberation Front of Corsica (Fronte di Liberazione Naziunale di a Corsica, FLNC) on 5 May 1976. The FLNC formally began the Corsican conflict and waged a harsh guerrilla campaign for nearly 12 years, only briefly interrupted by a 1981-1982 ceasefire and the implementation of the Defferre Accords. In 1988, following the re-election of François Mitterrand to his position as President of France, the FLNC signed a controversial ceasefire and began to negotiate with the French government for an eventual peace.

This ceasefire resulted in a convoluted breakup of the FLNC, and two main organisations appeared from the collapse of the group, dubbed by the press as the FLNC-Canal Historique (Canale Storicu; FLNC-CS), the FLNC-Canal Habituel (Canale Abituale; FLNC-CA). the FLNC-CA, led by Alain Orsoni, maintained some communications with the French state, attempting to continue to original FLNC's negotiations for peace. These resulted in the 1992 Joxe Accords. Meanwhile, the FLNC-CS, led by co-leaders Charles Pieri and François Santoni, began an intense armed campaign against French control of the island. The FLNC-CS became famous for its harshly militaristic beliefs, and the two main FLNC dissidents engaged in a harsh military feud, with both the FLNC-CA and FLNC-CS committing ambushes and assassinations on each other. This sparked the beginning of a bloody period of the Corsican conflict marked by internal divisions and assassinations known as the Years of Lead.

The Years of Lead reached new levels in December 1995. The FLNC-CS was experiencing internal division due to proposed peace negotiations with the French government. A small number of anti-peace members split from the group and created Fronte Ribellu, which positioned itself as a group distant from the FLNC-CS and FLNC-CA's feud. These proposed negotiations began the Tralonca peace campaign, a messy and convoluted attempt at peace between France and the FLNC-CS that ultimately resulted in failure. Fronte Ribellu continued to exist in spite of this, however, and had become even more extreme and militaristic guerrillas engaged in a feud against the FLNC-CS. At the same time, the FLNC-CA declared their dissolution on 5 May 1996, the 20th anniversary of the FLNC's creation. Many members of the group opposed disollution, and created on the following day the FLNC-5 May (FLNC-5 Maghju, FLNC-5M). the FLNC-5M engaged in feuds with the FLNC-CS and later Fronte Ribellu.

=== Migliacciaru Accords and Foundation ===
In September 1998, François Santoni left the FLNC-Canal Historique, citing political polarisation, the failure of the Tralonca peace campaign, and alleged mafia influence in Charles Pieri's inner circle. Santoni continuously antagonised the FLNC-CS and Pieri in multiple interviews and public appearances, and he even wrote a series of books detailing Pieri's alleged mafia dealings aided by his lawyer and Corsica Nazione leader Jean-Guy Talamoni. Fearing yet another split and further conflict, FLNC-CS officials organised the so-called "Fiumorbo Nationalist Collective" in December 1998 to spur reunification of the violently feuding Corsican nationalist movements. The Fiumorbo region of Corsica, located on the east side of the island, is considered to be a historic area for Corsican nationalism, as it is the birthplace of some of the earliest anti-colonial organisations on the island.

On 17 March 1999, the Fiumorbo Nationalist Collective organised a meeting in the village of Migliacciaru in Prunelli-di-Fiumorbo of the various Corsican nationalist organisations in order to create a dialogue for peace. Present at the meeting were representatives from the following:

- The FLNC-CS
- The FLNC-CS's political wing A Cuncolta Indipendentista
- The FLNC-5M
- The FLNC-5M's political wing Corsica Viva
- Fronte Ribellu
- Rinnovu Naziunale, a political party created from Corsica Viva dissidents in 1998 (Rinnovu would later become the political wing of the FLNC-22 October)
- Union of the Corsican People
- The Corsican National Alliance, political wing of the armed group Resistenza, on ceasefire since 1995

At 3:00pm on that day, these representatives signed the Migliacciaru Peace Accords, which committed them to mending the fractured nationalist movement and ended the Years of Lead period. Notably absent from this meeting was Santoni's Presenza Naziunale political party, a group he created with fellow-FLNC-CS dissident Jean-Michel Rossi following his departure from the group in September. In June 1999, Santoni and Rossi created the extremist Armata Corsa guerrilla group and began waging open war with the newly formed "Fiumorbo coalition" of the FLNC-CS, FLNC-5M, and Fronte Ribellu.

Being attacked from two ends by the French authorities and Armata Corsa, the Fiumorbo coalition had to find a way to solve the incoming crisis. Some members of On 23 December 1999, the three members of the coalition, alongside Clandestinu, a small Corsican nationalist urban guerrilla group formed months prior and operating only in Ajaccio, announced the creation of the FLNC-Union of Combatants and an indefinite ceasefire with the French government. This coincided with an opening of dialogue by prime minister Lionel Jospin to various nationalist elected officials. This coinsided with a fourth attempt of Corsican peace talks, following the 1981-1982 Defferre accords, the 1991-1992 Joxe accords, and the 1996 Tralonca peace campaign.

=== Matignon Accords and conflict with Armata Corsa ===
The so-called Matignon process, which began with prime minister Jospin's visit in September 1999, had entered full swing following the FLNC-UC's opening of dialogue. Competing bills were passed in the Corsican Assembly March 2000: one presented by the anti-separatist left and centre led by Émile Zuccarelli calling for a vague notion of "the broadest possible autonomy possible" within the framework of the French government, and one jointly presented by the nationalist parties in the assembly and, unusually, the island's right-wing parties. José Rossi, president of the Corsican Assembly, had entered an unusual alliance with FLNC-UC official and leader of the Corsica Nazione coalition, Jean-Guy Talamoni, to secure autonomy and peace in Corsica. Corsican nationalists engaging in any sort of dialogue with the right wing was unprecedented, and this alliance received a large amount of press coverage and became a symbol for Corsican peace. Their bill, presented jointly by Rossi's right-wing Liberal Democracy party and Talamoni's far-left Corsica Nazione coalition, was more specific than the anti-separatist bill and called for "full legislative and regulatory authority".

One of the early concerns of the Matignon process was the worry of infighting between nationalists. Alongside the creation of the FLNC-UC, the political wings of the various armed groups making up the FLNC-UC created an alliance in the Corsican Assembly called Unità alongside some smaller nationalist parties. Unità was not a coalition, but rather an alliance of parties, meaning infighting was sometimes common. The FLNC-UC as a whole suffered from a similar issue as some members of the previously hostile organisations still held grudges persisting from the Years of Lead.

On 6 April 2000, twenty-two elected officials from Corsica travelled to the Hôtel Matignon to meet with Jospin a second time. The first meeting, which occurred in December 1999 with twenty-eight officials, including all senators and deputies representing Corsica in the national government, left Prime Minister Jospin "confident" and Talamoni "optimistic" about the possible deal. This second meeting had only Jospin and members of the Corsican Assembly. Subsequent meetings occurred every Monday, dubbed "Matignon mondays" (French: lundis de Matignon; Corsican: i luni di Matignon). These meetings, characterised by occasional infighting, led to an agreement on 20 July which proposed institutional changes for Corsica, including a single all-island territorial authority and the mandatory teaching of the Corsican language in early school years.

During these meetings, the FLNC-UC remained on ceasefire and their political fronts remained a critical piece of the process. However, at the same time, conflict with Armata Corsa remained common, and the two engaged in feud resulting in multiple deaths. The most important of this was the assassination of Jean-Michel Rossi, the second-in-command of Armata Corsa. On 7 August 2000, Jean-Michel Rossi and his close associate Jean-Claude Fratacci were shot and killed in a café by an FLNC-UC assassin. This caused an outcry on the island, as Armata Corsa began to ramp up its attacks in reprisal of this, and Lionel Jospin declared that the Matignon process would end if violence by the FLNC-UC persisted.

On 31 August 2000, former Prime Minister Michel Rocard delivered a speech in which he, in a first for any national government official in France, acknowledged the "Corsican revolt" and "a history of oppression" done in the name of the French government. He gave his support to the Matignon process and the Corsicans' "Right to resist oppression". President of France Jacques Chirac and Interior minister Jean-Pierre Chevènement clashed often with Jospin over negotiating with Corsican nationalists. Chirac, asked by the press about the so-called "Corsican question", proclaimed on 22 September 2000, "the Republic is one and indivisible". Chirac and Unità also clashed over the mandatory teaching of the Corsican language in schools. One of the most controversial aspects of the Matignon process was, as with the previous Corsican autonomy negotiations, the release of political prisoners held in detention on the French mainland. Chirac was determined to keep them imprisoned, stating he would not sign off on any amnesty initiative. Meanwhile, arrests continued throughout the peace process, which were repeatedly denounced by Talamoni, who went as far as to state they were "threatening the Matignon process". On 29 August 2000, Chevènement resigned as France's Minister of the Interior over the peace process, claiming Corsican autonomy would give way to French decentralisation. He also stated that the FLNC-UC should've disavowed violence entirely and that the government had no part negotiating with armed organisations.

The Matignon process had reached a temporary halt by December. Charles Pieri, the FLNC-UC's leader, was arrested in 1998 after a "large arsenal" was found in his home. Calls for his release were ignored, and he was convicted and sentenced to five years in prison and one year of a suspended prison sentence on 15 December 2000. Also in December, the FLNC-UC, dissatisfied with the ongoing peace, committed three bomb attacks across Corsica. They claimed this did not break their ceasefire and were meant as a "warning" to French authorities to help facilitate the demands of Unità, the FLNC-UC's legal front. In January 2001, A Cuncolta Indipendentista declared the peace process was "compromised" by Santoni's conviction. Around a week later, Corsica Nazione, the coalition Cuncolta heads, delivered a more tempered statement in opposition to Pieri's jailing, but declares itself still committed to the peace process. Corsica Nazione is a key member of the Unità alliance.

On 13 May 2001, the various political parties created during the years of lead, all of which had been under the wing of the FLNC-UC since its creation, announce their unification into Indipendenza. Indipendenza is the leader of the Corsica Nazione coalition. Following this, Unità disappears entirely, with most of the parties involved having merged into the new party. The announcement of Indipendenza's creation is accompanied by an FLNC-UC action in which a manifesto, titled "U Ribellu" (the rebel), is handed out to citizens across Corsica by men in balaclavas.

Throughout mid-2001, numerous protests occurred for the release of political prisoners, which had become a controversial issue that threatened the peace process entirely. Amnesty was a controversial issue in the last attempted peace processes as well, and was the main reason the Tralonca peace process failed. The FLNC continued to claim sparse attacks, claiming to be "putting pressure" on the government to "act quickly".

On 17 August 2001, François Santoni, leader of Armata Corsa, was assassinated by a group of Brise de Mer mobsters, who he had made enemies with by threatening their leadership and breaking the Corsican tradition of omertà, which is a social code of silence pertaining to the island's mafia. Armata Corsa committed reprisal attacks on the FLNC-UC, who they perceived to be the perpetrators, including attacks sending nail bombs to FLNC-UC politicians and lawyers, but in the end the organisation disappeared soon after.

Numerous activists and members of Indipendenza were arrested or summoned to court in September and October 2001, including their leader Jean-Guy Talamoni. This caused significant unrest as the Matignon process was yet again threatened. In late September, Corsica Nazione and Indipendenza alone held press conferences where they announced they will be suspending their support for the Matignon process. Meanwhile, the FLNC-UC began to ramp up their attacks again, officially ending the ceasefire. Another group would also begin attacks at the same time, known to the press as the FLNC-Anonymes (Corsican: FLNC-Anonimi; roughly translated as FLNC of Anonymous Individuals). This group, abbreviated FLNC-A, carried out large attacks on French government buildings in Corsica, mostly in Haute-Corse. The FLNC-UC and FLNC-A struck an alliance together, and some in law enforcement claim the two acted as one organisation by the end of the FLNC-A's existence.

The Matignon process continued following the nationalist exit. The previously agreed statutes were passed by the French parliament in 2002 and in 2003, a referendum, boycotted by the nationalists, was held in which participants voted not to implement most of the Matignon reforms by a very narrow margin.

=== Split and feud with the FLNC-22U ===
Throughout 2002, the FLNC suffered through internal tension regarding their position on the armed struggle. Going back on ceasefire was not up for discussion, but rather how far to take the armed struggle and to what extent dialogue with the state would be permitted. The FLNC-UC's main position was armed struggle with a possible political solution if the timing is right, but many members of the FLNC-UC, particularly former members of the FLNC-5M, called for a more active conflict with no possibility of a truce or negotiations with the French government, advocating "radicalism against the state". These radical members began to rally around the Rinnovu political party, which had made headlines for their anti-negotiation stance during the Matignon process, rather than Indipendenza, the FLNC-UC's official political wing. This resulted in the creation of a small group known as the National Liberation Army (Corsican: Armata di Liberazione Naziunale; ALN) in August 2002 from disgruntled FLNC-UC members. On 22 October 2002, the ALN was joined by a large number of FLNC-UC dissidents unhappy with the direction of the organisation, founding the FLNC-22 October (Corsican: 22 Uttrovi; FLNC-22U, in some dialects 22 Ottobre; FLNC-22O).

The FLNC-UC engaged in a prolonged conflict with the FLNC-22U, and the two groups frequently engaged in turf wars and settling of scores. In August 2003, Maurice Galeani, a militant of the FLNC-UC sentenced to six years in prison for an FLNC attack in 1987, was shot and killed by members of the FLNC-22U. Following this, in November 2003, the FLNC-UC declared yet another ceasefire to attempt to "mend the nationalist movement" and focus on engaging in dialogue with the FLNC-22U to end the internal conflict. The FLNC-22U rejected any dialogue and continued to clash with the FLNC-UC. This is the second FLNC-UC ceasefire since the creation of the organisation four years prior. This ceasefire lasted until March 2005, and afterward the group continued to regularly carry out bomb attacks and assassinations. The FLNC-UC and FLNC-22U continued their violent feud until 2009.

Starting in 2002, the FLNC-UC engaged in a feud with the far-right Resistenza Corsa paramilitary group. In August 2003, faced with "disarmament or dissolution" by the FLNC-UC, Resistenza Corsa joined the former organisation as its fifth member.

=== Unified FLNC ===
Peace was eventually achieved between the FLNC-UC and FLNC-22U in 2009. Both organisations had suffered heavily; while they continued to carry out bomb attacks regularly, both groups struggled to maintain the momentum due to mass arrests by French police and the FLNC-22U lost a fraction of its members to the FLNC-1976 splinter group. This forced the groups to work together, and in February 2009, the FLNC-22U joined the FLNC-UC. Coinciding with this, the two groups' political wings, Indipendenza and Rinnovu, merged to form Corsica Libera. This party won nearly 10% of the vote in the 2010 Corsican territorial elections.

The group began claiming attacks under both the FLNC-UC and the name "Unified FLNC" (Corsican: FLNC-Unificatu, FLNC-U), symbolizing the new union of the two previously feuding groups. The first use of the FLNC-U label was on 22 July 2009 with a car bomb attack targeting the gendarmerie office of the town of Vescovato. The attack caused no injuries, but around 20 people had been on the scene during the attack. On the night of 9 August 2009, the FLNC-U held a press conference in the maquis of Corsica, rural areas of shrubland typically occupied by armed groups. Two men standing in front of the “Ribellu” flag announced the creation of the group and urged the hostilities between the FLNC-U and the FLNC-1976 to end in order to form a united front against France in order to drive them out of Corsica.

The FLNC-U label would be used to claim 24 more attacks committed throughout 2009 in another press conference held in Ajaccio on 31 January 2010, 2 days before Nicolas Sarkozy’s visit to Corsica. Here, the group denounced the Corsican real-estate business and the buying out of Corsican land by wealthy people from continental France. The final FLNC-U conference occurred on 2 June 2012, claiming a series of attacks targeting France as well as the Brise de Mer mafia, denouncing Mafia involvement in the Corsican conflict.

Cracks began to show within the FLNC-U immediately following its creation, but the collapse of the structure, as well as Corsica Libera, became especially evident during a February 2012 meeting held to ratify the newly elected executive of Corsica Libera, all representatives who were formerly members of Rinnovu abstained on ratification. None of the Rinnovu members voted in any of the following Corsica Libera executive council meetings. The main point of conflict between the FLNC-UC and FLNC-22U was the level of integration; FLNC-UC members wanted to completely merge the organisations while FLNC-22U members wanted a looser confederation. Rinnovu leader and FLNC-22U leader Paul-Félix Benedetti announced the "inevitable" split of the groups in September 2012.

From 2008 to 2012 the FLNC-UC carried out a campaign of attacks against large supermarket industries in Corsica, claiming to be in line with the "social and union struggles of Corsicans facing capitalist French colonialism". While the FLNC-UC never explicitly called itself Marxist as the original FLNC and FLNC-CS did, this campaign and the rhetoric around it reflected many of the far-left statements of these organisations.

=== Disarmament ===
The FLNC-UC continued to carry out large-scale attacks in 2012 and 2013. For example, in December 2012, the group carried out a "blue night" in which around 30 vacant villas and second homes owned by upper-class mainland Frenchmen were bombed in the span of a few hours. A similar event occurred again just a month later. At the same time, conflict had resumed with the FLNC-22U, and the group had been paralyzed by infighting regarding whether or not to engage in further political endeavours.

Corsica Libera had been doing quite well in the polls, and the group's main representative in the Corsican Assembly, Jean-Guy Talamoni, was gearing up for an alliance with Gilles Simeoni's autonomist party Femu a Corsica. Many wanted to pursue a peaceful approach to Corsican nationalism, seeing the possibility of a nationalist government in the 2015 Corsican territorial election. On 25 June 2014, the group declared the decision to abandon arms "with no preconditions", and began to process of disarming soon after. While disarmed, the FLNC-UC mostly sat dormant, although the group made some brief press conferences on occasion. In 2021, the group brokered an alliance with the FLNC-22U, and the two began jointly releasing communiqués and press statements together. The FLNC-22U went on truce, though did not fully disarm, in 2016.

=== Return to arms ===
Following the murder of Yvan Colonna in 2022, Corsica entered a period of violent unrest. the FLNC-22U and FLNC-UC issued a joint press release on 21 March 2023 in which both organisations announced a return to arms and claimed a large number of attacks. In late October 2023, the two groups claimed responsibility for the bombing of several vacation homes committed in a single night. Sporadic attacks by both organisations followed into 2024 and 2025. On 4 August 2024, an FLNC-UC commando gave a speech at an annual separatist rally in Corte in which they warned the Corsican population against the "dangers" of the far-right following the results of the 2024 French legislative election, in which the National Rally made historic gains. They also warned against local far-right movements, such as Mossa Palatina.

On 6 August 2026, the FLNC-UC held a press conference in which they rejected the ongoing autonomy process for Corsica, calling it a farce. They also notably denounced the "community of destiny", a historic FLNC doctrine dating back to the 1980s which states that anyone, regardless of national origin, can adopt Corsican language and customs and thus be Corsican. The FLNC-UC denounced mass migration from mainland France into Corsica, an event which they referred to as "settler-colonialism", stating Corsicans are facing "extinction". This press release was the first given in the absence of the FLNC-22U since 2021. The FLNC-22U still holds the community of destiny as an important doctrine, and the group has seemingly cut ties with the FLNC-UC.

== Ideology and demands ==
The FLNC-UC is a big tent coalition of Corsican nationalists on all sides of the political spectrum. Most members are far-left, however, and the group's main predecessor, the FLNC-Canal Historique, was openly Marxist. At the same time, the far-right Resistenza Corsa guerrilla group was merged into the FLNC-UC in 2003, giving the far-right a faction within the organisation. According to Corse-Matin, the FLNC-UC seems to have shifted right since August 2026 due to the rejection of the "community of destiny".

Like most Corsican nationalist organisations, the group considers environmentalism, agrarianism, and the "defense of the land" to be imperative to Corsican nationalism. The FLNC-UC often uses violence to demonstrate their commitment to these ideals, such as the assassination of the Corsican agricultural commissioner in 2013. In January 2025, the FLNC-UC released a press release in which three attacks were claimed and the group defended Corsican farmers and the "agricultural tradition" present in Corsica.

The FLNC-UC holds broadly anti-capitalist views and often compares capitalism to French colonialism in Corsica. This rhetoric was especially present during. 2009 campaign against large supermarket businesses, notably Casino, in which they declared support for the "social and union struggles" of Corsican workers.

The FLNC-UC pushes for broader language rights in Corsica, claiming that French colonialism actively represses the Corsican language.

== Support and opposition ==
The FLNC-UC gives support to numerous international movements, most notably the Irish reunification movement. The organisation also gave support to Hamas following Israel's invasion of Gaza in 2023.

The FLNC-UC is hostile to French authority, and in recent years has grown increasingly hostile to Corsican autonomists, notably the Femu a Corsica party. The paramilitary considers autonomy a "farce" and pushes for a clean break from French authority.
