= FLNC-Canal Historique =

Corsican paramilitary organization

- FLNC-Canale Storicu
- Flag of Corsica with an FLNC wordmark at the bottom, used often during FLNC-CS press conferences
- Leaders: Charles Pieri, François Santoni (until 1998)
- Dates active: 25 November 1990 - 23 December 1999
- Split from: National Liberation Front of Corsica (1976-1990)
- Merged into: FLNC-Union of Combatants
- Split to: Fronte Ribellu (in 1996)
- Country: Corsica (France)
- Newspaper: U Ribombu
- Active regions: Corsica actions across mainland France and in Sardinia
- Ideology: Corsican nationalism Marxism; Environmentalism
- Political position: Far-left
- Wars: Corsican conflict

The FLNC-Canal Historique (Corsican: Canale Storicu; abbreviated FLNC-CS) was an armed paramilitary and guerrilla organization created in 1990 from a split within the command structure of the original FLNC. The organization was made of a radically militant base, rejecting the idea of ceasefire with the French government. During Corsica's “Years of Lead”, a violent period of intense guerrilla warfare and infighting in the 1990s, the FLNC-CS was particularly active, engaging in intense conflict with both French authorities as well as with other nationalist organizations, most notably fighting a war with Alain Orsoni’s FLNC-Canal Habituel (Canale Abituale, FLNC-CA). In 1999, The FLNC-CS became one of the founding members of the FLNC-Union of Combatants, a guerrilla organization which remains active today following the end of a nine-year long ceasefire.

The FLNC-CS formed after a two-year long dissident campaign within the FLNC, during which brigade leaders and other divisions of the FLNC began to separate due to their views of the 1988 ceasefire as “illegitimate”. On 25 November 1990, the town of Borgo was invaded, and in the same day during the occupation the dissident militants declared the creation of the “Historic Channel” (Corsican: Canale Storicu; French: Canal Historique) of the FLNC. One month earlier, the “Habituel Channel” (FLNC-Canale Abituale, FLNC-CA) was formed out of the dissolution of the brigade council and Alain Orsoni’s seizure of power. These two groups engaged in a drawn out civil war until the dissolution of the FLNC-CA in 1996. That same year, the FLNC-CS would begin to lose footing to Fronte Ribellu, a splinter group of the organisation, and the FLNC-5 May (FLNC-5 Maghju, FLNC-5M), a split of the FLNC-CA. In 1999, the FLNC-CS southern division leader François Santoni split from the organization to form Armata Corsa, a hyper-militant terrorist organization that carried out a large number of assassinations and attacks on the FLNC-CS and other guerrillas as well as French authorities. On 23 December 1999, the FLNC-CS, Fronte Ribellu, the FLNC-5M, and a small organization called Clandestinu formed the FLNC-Union of Combatants to better organize against both Armata Corsa and pursue a failed peace with the French government.

== History ==
=== Background ===
The National Liberation Front of Corsica (FLNC) formed on 5 May 1976. From then on, the group engaged in a prolonged guerrilla war against French authorities on the island of Corsica. The FLNC was quite popular amongst the people of Corsica, and for the most part internal divisions were rare in the first few years of the conflict.

The first divisions began to appear within the FLNC following 1979. A surge of popular support resulting from local influence and the militaristic and oppresive response of French authorities to the conflict, such as their response to the Bastelica-Fesch affair, caused many Corsicans to rally around the FLNC and join the organization in droves. This, coupled with arrests of high-ranking officials, caused the FLNC to adopt a new system of leadership in which two governing bodies, the political cunsigliu (council) and the military ghjunta (junta) governed in tandem.

This system was initially successful, but its problems became evident during the 1981-1982 Defferre accords. The cunsigliu wanted to pursue peace and work alongside the French government for Corsican autonomy, whereas the ghjunta wanted to continue using armed struggle as the primary tool for Corsican independence, avoiding any negotiation with the French state or any political participation in general. Borgo-Lucciana brigade leader and ghjunta member Charles Pieri gained a following within the FLNC for his statements against the Defferre accords, and in 1982 Pieri carried out an assault on a Foreign Legion outpost in Sorbo-Ocagnano, breaking the ceasefire the FLNC set for the duration of the Defferre accords.

In 1983, the FLNC's central command (made up of the cunsigliu and ghjunta) narrowly passed a motion creating a so-called "revolutionary tax" system. Businesses in areas occupied by the FLNC were made to pay a given amount of money to the organisation, and business elsewhere, especially owned by Frenchmen, were at risk of being extorted by the group for money in exchange for keeping their business. This was controversial, and many members of the FLNC, especially those affiliated with the cunsigliu, viewed this as immoral. A major point of debate regarding the revolutionary tax was how much of it was going back to the FLNC.Members of the ghjunta, who led the FLNC's brigades, were accused of extorting businesses and not diverting the money to the FLNC's command. This accusation was common amongst the urban brigades of the FLNC, mainly François Santoni's Gravona brigade, centred around the suburbs of northeastern Ajaccio, and Charles Pieri's Borgo-Lucciana brigade, operating in Bastia's southern suburbs. These accusations gained a large amount of attention following the 1983 Schock affair, in which Gravona brigade members assassinated a barber who refused to pay a tax imposed on him by the brigade. An internal FLNC investigation revealed this money was going to Santoni rather than the FLNC itself. Many moved to punish Santoni, but Pieri and other radical members came to his defense, and due to the two-branch system, nothing could be done to punish him.

After the Schock affair, the distance between the consigliu and the ghjunta gradually worsened, and by 1987 they had begun to refuse cooperation. The cunsigliu, headed at this time by cunsigliu president Pierre Poggioli, began organizing a joint congress to hash out issues between the brigade leaders in the ghjunta and deputies in the cunsigliu. Instrumental in this process was Alain Orsoni, who was a cunsigliu member representing the Ajaccio region. The first congress was held in the Gravona area of Ajaccio region and dealt with the controversial issue of centralization and autonomy. Gravona was likely chosen due to the Gravona brigade leader, François Santoni, being an ardent autonomist who had disobeyed central committee orders many times, most notably when he ordered his brigade to carry out the attempted assassination of Valéry Giscard d’Estaing in 1981.

=== FLNC split and foundation ===
On 8 May 1988, François Mitterrand was re-elected to his position as president of France. One of Mitterrand's goals in his first term was peace in Corsica, and despite temporarily abandoning this policy following the FLNC's withdrawal from the Defferre process and the escalation of violence following it, Mitterrand was open to further discussions on Corsican autonomy. On the night of Mitterrand's re-election, the FLNC called a ceasefire to attempt to facilitate negotiations with the newly re-elected government. This was a highly controversial decision within the FLNC, and by mid-1989 several high-ranking officials, mostly from the ghjunta, including Jean-Michel Rossi, François Santoni, Charles Pieri, and Pierre Alessandri, withdrew their brigades from the FLNC. Further dissident splits followed, including an insurrectionary movement in Ajaccio led by Roger Polverelli. The followers of the anti-ceasefire movement earned the name “Historiques” (Storichi in Corsican) due to their strong attachment to the hardline militant ideals of the original FLNC, and a dissident campaign was carried out by these brigades against the remaining FLNC structure from 1988 to 1990.

Pierre Poggioli, leader of the FLNC's joint congress, resigned from the organisation on 16 September 1989 due to the harsh divisions and the so-called "internal war" causing the groups collapse. On paper, this left the FLNC with no proper leader, but many in the cunsigliu began to rally around Alain Orsoni, who had become the group's political leader and ran A Cuncolta Naziunalista, the FLNC's political wing created following the dissolution of the Corsican Movement for Self-Determination. Poggioli would create his own party, the Corsican National Alliance, and armed group, Resistenza, in 1990. Resistenza aligned itself with the FLNC-Canal Historique until 1993.

In August 1990, A Cuncolta Naziunalista sufferred from numerous controversial splits, as the leadership centred around Orsoni struggled to keep the Historiques remaining in the party from going against their word. This resulted in Orsoni's ousting by Pieri and Santoni, who became joint leaders of the organisation, with Pieri acting as secretary-general in Haute-Corse and Santoni acting as secretary-general of Corse-du-Sud. In October of that same year, Orsoni took control of the FLNC central command, dissolved it, and re-organised it into the FLNC-Canal Habituel (Canale Abituale, FLNC-CA). This was coupled with the creation of the Movement for Self-Determination (Muvimentu per l'Autodeterminazione, MPA), Orsoni's new political party.

On 25 November 1990, representatives from the dissident Historique brigades sent armed men to the town of Borgo, 20 kilometres south of the city of Bastia, and occupied it. There, they delivered the so-called "Borgo Declaration", where they announced the creation of the FLNC-Canal Historique (FLNC-CS) via the unification of the various dissident brigades. This was coupled with a statement denouncing the FLNC-Canal Habituel. At the same time, Santoni was also publicly making unverifiable accusations that Orsoni had embezzled large amounts of money during his time as leader of A Cuncolta Naziunalista.

The creation of the FLNC-CS was met with immediate scrutiny from the French government, with interior minister Pierre Joxe giving a public speech in which he advised Corsicans to "isolate the terrorists who kill and destroy" while "uniting those who build and sustain Corsica". Joxe had secured the support of the remainder of the FLNC (now the FLNC-CA) for his main political project, the Joxe agreements, which were undergoing debate in the National Assembly at the time. Pierre Mauroy, former prime minister, spoke in the National Assembly two days after the creation of the FLNC-CS and warned of "the consequence of abandoning" the Joxe agreements, fearful it would further radicalise Corsican nationalists. He also alluded to the dangers of the violent anti-separatism of the right in the French government, spearheaded at that time by Jean-Pierre Chevènement.

=== Early years ===
The 1990s saw a wave of bombings, ambushes, raids, assassinations, and other forms of guerrilla warfare targeted at both the FLNC-CS, FLNC-CA, and France. Corsican nationalists frequently feuded and split, causing large amounts of violence within the movement and warfare between the various groups. This earned the era the name “Years of Lead”, much like the one in nearby Italy. This period would last until the Migliacciaru accords were signed in 1999.

The first hostilities between the FLNC-CS and the FLNC-CA occurred on 29 November, just four days after the creation of the FLNC-CS. Habituels stormed the headquarters of U Ribombu, the press organ of the FLNC-CS, and stole the technical equipment from the building. The Habituels left a large-calibre bullet on the table in the printing room to represent a threat against the Historiques. The equipment they stole was used to print A Paese, their own newspaper. This kickstarted a chain of assassinations and tit-for-tat attacks by Habituels and Historiques.

The FLNC-CS engaged in numerous attacks against French government targets in the early years of its existence. Some of these attacks also targeted civilian supporters of French authority, such as the car-bombing of a pro-French University professor in Corte on 27 December 1990. Another major target of attacks were tourist installations across Corsica, notably second homes and vacation villas. On 2 January 1991, eight villas in the Linguizzetta area alone were destroyed in a bomb attack.

On 30 January 1991, an FLNC-CS commando kidnapped Aurélien Garcia, commissioner for economic development in Corsica, a role appointed to him by the French national government. Historiques, all of whom were members of the Corsican Agricultural Union (the FLNC-CS's agricultural labour wing) detained Garcia on the floor of the Corsican Assembly, tied him in a sleeping bag, and placed the bag on a luggage belt in Ajaccio airport to be "shipped" back to Paris.

On 29 March 1991, the FLNC-CS released "U Sicondu Quarternu" (The Second Pamphlet), a paper officially outlining the group's political positions, goals, and ideals. Among these ideals was a hardline stance of Corsican independence through armed action, the implimentation of a Marxist government in Corsica, and solidarity with international "liberation struggles", such as the Irish reunification movement and Basque liberation movement.

The FLNC-CS began a long-running campaign against the education system of Corsica in July 1991. On 7 July, a bomb attack damaged the headquarters of the Ministry of National Education in Paris. This was coupled with attacks on the Departmental Directorates of Education for Haute-Corse and Corse-du-Sud. This was claimed by the FLNC-CS on 9 July in a press conference where the French education system was denounced as "propaganda" and the group pushed for the mandatory teaching of the Corsican language in Corsican schools. Numerous attacks against symbols of the education system in Corsica would be carried out by the FLNC-CS for the remainder of its existence, including a bomb attack on the academic rectorates of Créteil and Arcueil on 16 September 1991.

On 22 March 1992, A Cuncolta Naziunalista, which had become the FLNC-CS's political wing under Pieri and Santoni's leadership, won three seats in that year's territorial election. This was done as part of the Corsica Nazione electoral coalition, which together won nine seats.

The FLNC-CS gained a significant amount of public sway in Corsican daily life in 1992. One of the most instrumental factors of this was the acquisition of SC Bastia's management team. Jean-François Filippi, the president of SC Bastia, hired Historiques as bodyguards and donated large sums of money to the organisation. Filippi also appointed Historiques to important roles of the club's management team, including Jean-Martin Verdi, who was given the role of general secretary, the club's second-highest position. The FLNC-CS's role within SC Bastia became highly publicised following the Furiani stadium disaster, in which 14 people died and hundreds were injured following the collapse of a hastily-built stadium addition made in order to seat more people for Bastia's upcoming game with Olympique Marseille. Filippi was widely blamed for the tragedy, and a large amount of public scrutiny began to befall him. Nonetheless, the FLNC-CS continued to support Filippi, causing internal controversy. SC Bastia, deemed the Historique's "money pump", continued to donate to the FLNC-CS despite the controversy.

On 14 July 1992, the FLNC-CS held a press conference in the maquis around Figari where they demanded "independence, which presupposes the responsibility of all and constitutes an extension of the right to self-determination". The FLNC-Canal Habituel (FLNC-CA) was quick to denounce this notion in their own press conference on 7 August, where they stated, "it is not in the nature of the FLNC to replace the Corsican people in determining the institutional or other choices that belong to them". They also added, "our struggle for self-determination has no other purpose than to intervene as a supporting force on the political and military front without claiming to hold, let alone impose, the solution". The FLNC-CA ended their ceasefire three days later.

Throughout 1992, many members of the FLNC were arrested and brought to trial in mainland France. To protest this, the FLNC carried out a bomb attack severely damaging the Palace of Justice in Aix-en-Provence. It took longer than a year to restore the courthouse to use.

=== Sozzi affair and internal divisions ===
On 15 June 1993, Robert Sozzi, a notable member of the FLNC-Canal Historique, was murdered by a group of several other Historiques following an ambush. In the coming months, many Historiques made claims that Sozzi was killed for disagreeing with the protection of Jean-François Filippi and SC Bastia by the FLNC-CS. The FLNC-CA began to pressure the FLNC-CS to take responsibility, and on 8 August 1993, the FLNC-CS claimed formal responsibility for Sozzi's killing, claiming him to be a "traitor" who had given names of Historiques to the police.

The claim of responsibility for Sozzi's murder caused a large amount of instability for the FLNC-CS. It caused the end of the FLNC-CS's alliance with Resistenza, a fragile alliance brokered by Pieri in 1991, and the breakup of the Corsica Nazione coalition. Internally, divisions became evident. Some Historiques had left to create the "Movement of 15 June", a clandestine group made to pressure the Historiques to expel those responsible for Sozzi's death, and those who stayed began to distrust Pieri and Santoni's administration of the FLNC-CS. Filippi was himself assassinated by Habituels on 26 December 1994.

Internal divisions became more pressing following the Sperone affair, in which fourteen Historiques were caught in a shootout by French police, who had arrived at Sperone golf course in Bonifacio following an anonymous tip that the FLNC-CS was planning a bombing there. This caused a heightened sense of distrust within the FLNC-CS, believing police informants to be rampant, pinning the blame on undercover journalist Jérôme Feracci.

A large amount of Historiques were assassinated or ambushed and killed by Habituels in 1995. Many Habituels were also killed by Historiques, though due to the more stable nature of their organisation at the time, this did not cause as much of a ripple effect within the FLNC-CA as it did within the FLNC-CS. The death of numerous high-ranking Historiques was the final straw for many within the FLNC-CS, and the group officially split in two, with dissidents creating Fronte Ribellu on 5 December 1995. The group claimed in its founding conference to be separated from the "quarreling nationalists too busy settling their vendettas" and called for the resignation of MPA and A Cuncolta Naziunalista elected officials. Fronte Ribellu would end up in open conflict with the FLNC-CS by 1996.

=== Tralonca peace campaign ===
On 10 January 1996, the FLNC-CS announced a ceasefire to negotiate with prime minister Alain Juppé's government. This came a year and a half after small negotiations with interior minister Charles Pasqua, spearheaded by Charles Pieri. This ceasefire triggered a series of FLNC-CS negotiations with Juppé and interior minister Jean-Louis Debré. Following the arrest of numerous Historiques and members of A Cuncolta, negotiations broke down and the FLNC-CS broke ceasefire with the bombing of the Bordeaux town hall on 5 October 1996.

=== Final years ===
Following the end of the Tralonca campaign, the FLNC-CS quickly resumed bombings and other attacks on French government targets. However, a lot of the group's energy went into feuds with Fronte Ribellu and the FLNC-5 May (a group which split from the FLNC-Canal Habituel shortly after its disarming in 1996).

On 5 February 1998, the prefect of Corsica, Claude Érignac, was assassinated by members of the Cargèse-Sagone brigade, an isolated Corsican nationalist guerrilla formation which split off the FLNC-CS in late 1991. This caused a harsh crackdown by French officials on Corsican guerrillas, resulting in the arrest of numerous Historiques, including Pieri.

In September 1998, François Santoni left the FLNC-Canal Historique, citing political polarisation, the failure of the Tralonca peace campaign, and alleged mafia influence in Charles Pieri's inner circle. Santoni continuously antagonised the FLNC-CS and Pieri in multiple interviews and public appearances, and he even wrote a series of books detailing Pieri's alleged mafia dealings aided by his lawyer and Corsica Nazione leader Jean-Guy Talamoni. Fearing yet another split and further conflict, FLNC-CS officials organised the so-called "Fiumorbo Nationalist Collective" in December 1998 to spur reunification of the violently feuding Corsican nationalist movements. The Fiumorbo region of Corsica, located on the east side of the island, is considered to be a historic area for Corsican nationalism, as it is the birthplace of some of the earliest anti-colonial organisations on the island.

On 17 March 1999, the Fiumorbo Nationalist Collective organised a meeting in the village of Migliacciaru in Prunelli-di-Fiumorbo of the various Corsican nationalist organisations in order to create a dialogue for peace. Present at the meeting were representatives from the following:

- The FLNC-CS
- The FLNC-CS's political wing A Cuncolta Indipendentista
- The FLNC-5 May
- The FLNC-5 May's political wing Corsica Viva
- Fronte Ribellu
- Rinnovu Naziunale, a political party created from Corsica Viva dissidents in 1998 (Rinnovu would later become the political wing of the FLNC-22 October)
- Union of the Corsican People
- The Corsican National Alliance, political wing of the armed group Resistenza, on ceasefire since 1995

At 3:00pm on that day, these representatives signed the Migliacciaru Peace Accords, which committed them to mending the fractured nationalist movement and ended the Years of Lead period. Notably absent from this meeting was Santoni's Presenza Naziunale political party, a group he created with fellow-FLNC-CS dissident Jean-Michel Rossi following his departure from the group in September. In June 1999, Santoni and Rossi created the extremist Armata Corsa guerrilla group and began waging open war with the newly formed "Fiumorbo coalition" of the FLNC-CS, FLNC-5M, and Fronte Ribellu.

Being attacked from two ends by the French authorities and Armata Corsa, the Fiumorbo coalition had to find a way to solve the incoming crisis. Some members of On 23 December 1999, the three members of the coalition, alongside Clandestinu, a small Corsican nationalist urban guerrilla group formed months prior and operating only in Ajaccio, announced the creation of the FLNC-Union of Combatants and an indefinite ceasefire with the French government. This coincided with an opening of dialogue by prime minister Lionel Jospin to various nationalist elected officials. This coinsided with a fourth attempt of Corsican peace talks, following the 1981-1982 Defferre accords, the 1991-1992 Joxe accords, and the 1996 Tralonca peace campaign.

== Structure ==
The FLNC-Canal Historique was divided into two leadership structures: one for Haute-Corse and one for Corse-du-Sud. These two structures were further split into individual brigades along geographic lines, similar to the ghjunta system of the original FLNC. The autonomy of these brigades varied greatly; some were under near direct control of the central command, whereas some, like the Cargèse-Sagone brigade, were nearly independent. Organisation changed following the departure of François Santoni in 1998. The group was reorganised in a fashion where most decisions were directly undertaken by the now sole leader Charles Pieri.

== Ideology and demands ==
The FLNC-Canal Historique was primarily a Corsican nationalist organisation. Outside of this, the FLNC-CS held numerous other positions.

The FLNC-CS, like the original FLNC, was a Marxist organisation. The group called for an independent socialist Corsican state aligned with other socialist movements worldwide, primarily in Africa. The FLNC-CS called for the distribution of resources across Corsica to help sustain the livelyhood and economy of an independent Corsican state. The group also called for the seizure of all property owned by the "bourgeoisie" in order to distribute it to the Corsican "proletariat".

The group defined itself as anti-colonialist, and frequently denounced the United States and its role as an "imperialist" power. This was extended to the United Kingdom and France itself, which the FLNC-CS claimed to be increasingly under the United States' influence and themselves guilty of colonialist endeavours, most obviously in Corsica. The FLNC-CS repeatedly denounced the role of France in the Gulf War in its principle manifesto, "U Sicondu Quarternu". The FLNC-CS also held a policy of unity with the Irish unification movement and Palestinian militants.

The FLNC-CS viewed environmentalism as a fundamental part of Corsican nationalism, following in the footsteps of the original FLNC. The group would carry out numerous actions in the name of environmentalism, notably the bombing of an oil tanker in Sardinia in 1991.

The Canal Historique also called for further teaching of the Corsican language, holding the French education system in contempt for not properly teaching the language in schools.
