= National Liberation Front of Corsica =

Corsican nationalist militant organizations

- Fronte di liberazione naziunale di a Corsica; Front de libération nationale corse
- All FLNC groups frequently use a Corsican flag along with their wordmark in sans-serif letters. In photo shoots, they will usually feature a Corsican flag in the background, along with a table, draped in white cloth with their wordmark prominently displayed.
- Other name: U Fronte; FLN
- Leaders: Léo Battesti (founder; formerly); Alain Orsoni X (FLNC-CA); François Santoni X (FLNC-CS); Charles Pieri (FLNC-CS and FLNC-UC); Paul-Felix Benedetti (FLNC-22U); Stephane Ori (FLNC-21M)
- Dates active: 4 May 1976 – active
- Active regions: Corsica, France; French mainland
- Ideology: Corsican nationalism Ethnic nationalism Environmentalism; Secessionism; Factions: Left-wing nationalism Right-wing nationalism Marxism-Leninism; Economic liberalism Anti-French sentiment Xenophobia
- Political position: Big Tent
- Status: Active
- Wars: Corsican conflict
- FLNC organizations: FLNC (1976-1990); FLNC-Canal Habituel; FLNC-Canal Historique; FLNC-5 May; FLNC-UC; FLNC-22 October; FLNC-1976; FLNC-9 July; FLNC-Rinascita; FLNC-May 21; New FLNC

The National Liberation Front of Corsica (Corsican: Fronte di liberazione naziunale di a Corsica or Fronte di liberazione naziunale corsu; French: Front de libération nationale corse, abbreviated FLNC) is a name used by various guerrilla and paramilitary organizations that advocate an independent or autonomous state on the island of Corsica, separated from France. The original FLNC was founded on 5 May 1976 from a merger between two smaller armed groups: the Corsican Peasant Front for Liberation (Fronte Paesanu Corsu per Liberazione, FPCL), and Ghjustizia Paolina (Corsican for Paoline Justice). This organization persisted until 1990, when a 1988 ceasefire agreement caused the unstable organization to split into two organizations based around separate ideas. In 1999, various factions merged to form the FLNC-Union of Combatants (FLNC-Unione di i Cumbattenti, FLNC-UC), a larger organization and one of the FLNCs which still exist today. In the present day, there are four organizations still active with the FLNC name: The FLNC-UC, The FLNC-22 October (FLNC-22 Uttrovi, FLNC-22U), the FLNC-1976, and the FLNC-21 May (FLNC-21 Maghju, FLNC-21M). The FLNC-UC and FLNC-22U, the two largest and most active groups, often sign press releases and communiqués together, and have been allied since at least 2022. The political party Nazione was founded in 2024 from the political party Corsica Libera, the modern political wing of the FLNC-UC. is led by Petr'Antu Tomasi, Ghjuvan-Guidu Talamoni and Josepha Giacometti-Piredda, with the participation of the former FLNC political prisoner Carlu Santoni. The FLNCs are all mostly local to Corsica but also commit attacks on the French mainland.

Typical militant acts by various FLNC organizations were bombings aimed at public buildings, banks, tourist infrastructure, military buildings and other perceived French symbols, in addition to armed bank robbery and extortion against private enterprises through so-called "revolutionary taxes". The attacks were usually performed against buildings and the island's infrastructures, but it was also not uncommon for FLNC organizations to have individual people as targets. This was especially common during the tumultuous period of the "Years of Lead", in which a large number of assassinations occurred between various warring factions, many successors of the original FLNC.

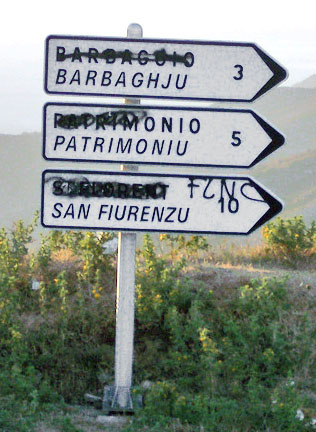
A road sign near Bastìa with the non-Corsican place names defaced, signed by the National Liberation Front of Corsica (FLNC)

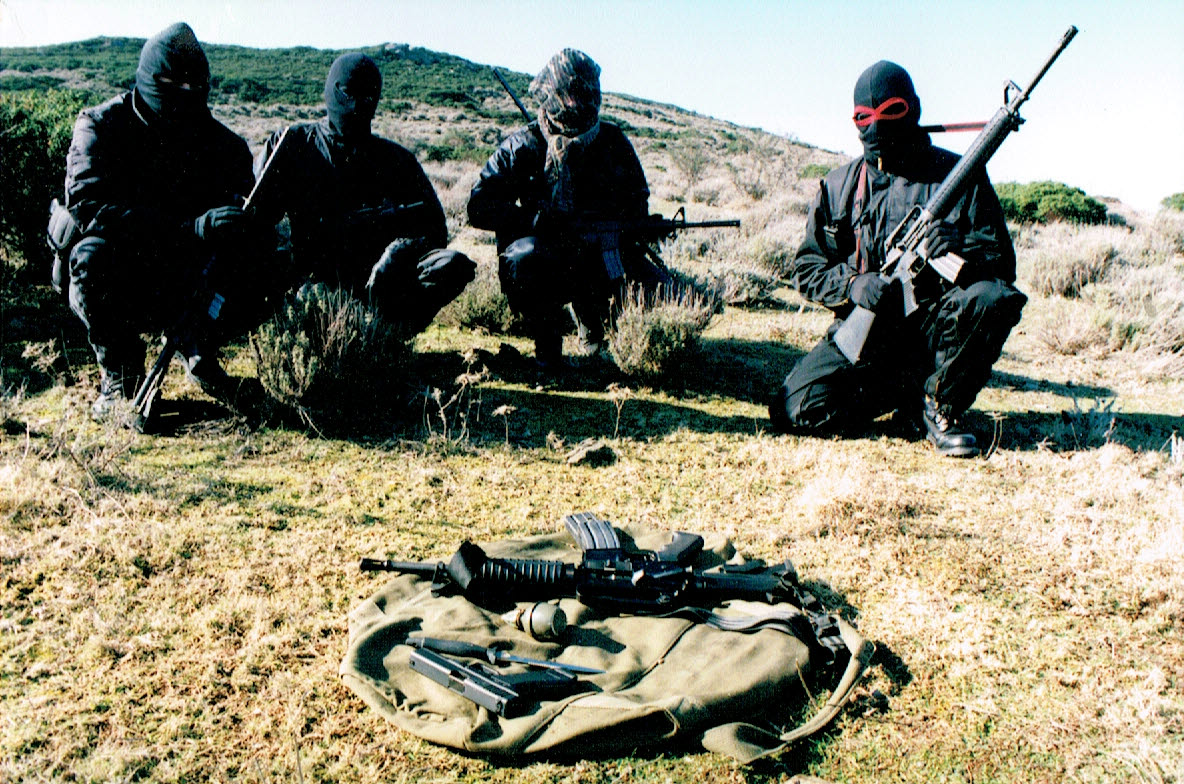
FLNC fighters

== Ideology ==
Ideology differs throughout the various FLNC groups; however, there are some ideas that are common throughout all of them, such as defense and officialisation of the Corsican language, the release of political prisoners, the environmental protection of the island, the economic development of the island, and the end of the mass immigration of French mainlanders to Corsica (described as "settler-colonialism" by some FLNC organizations, notably the FLNC-CS and FLNC-UC).

The original FLNC was notable for achieving a number of political objectives through peace agreements, notably the Defferre Agreements, a set of agreements between the FLNC and the French government named for French interior minister Gaston Defferre that created the modern Corsican political system, including the creation of the Corsican Assembly and the establishment of autonomous Corsican institutions, such as circuit courts and an executive council. The agreements also reopened the University of Corsica, closed by the French army in 1769, and outlined the removal of French Foreign Legion members from their posts across the island. The agreement also released many political prisoners and FLNC members through amnesty policies. When the promises of lowering military presence was not honored, the FLNC resumed its political campaign.

Environmentalism and defense of the land (incorporating a form of agrarianism or peasant socialism and the protection of grazing lands, mountains, forests, and marshes) have always been very important in the ideology of the FLNC groups, particularly in connection with the popular struggles of the 1970s against the pollution of red mud and the allocation of remediated lands of the Aléria plain (originally subject to malaria and now the only land on the island suitable for intensive agriculture) to pied-noir farmers rather than Corsicans.

Corsican nationalism is often the ideology of the FLNC groups, but some, most notably Alain Orsoni’s FLNC-Canal Habituel (FLNC-Canale Abituale, FLNC-CA), advocate greater autonomy instead. The embrace of autonomy rather than independence was a source of contention between the FLNC-CA and the rival FLNC-Canal Historique (FLNC-Canale Storicu, FLNC-CS), one of the most radical FLNC organizations.

The various FLNC organizations almost all hold a far-left political position. The original FLNC, as with the FLNC-CS, followed a communist ideology based on Marxist ideas. Nowadays, the current FLNCs all retain similar ideas but reject the Marxist label.

With the dissolution of the Canal Habituel and the formation of the FLNC-UC, led by Charles Pieri, the FLNC returned to a hardline independence line of protest against French colonialism as well as the monopoly economy, launching for example a campaign against supermarkets in the late 2000s (without adopting an explicitly Marxist discourse, but declaring itself to be "in line with the social and union struggles of our people in the face of the multiple relays of French colonialism in Corsica"). The FLNC of 22 October, which announced in a press release of 21 March 2023 that it would now operate in concert with the Union of Combatants, claimed in the 2000s to embody an even more radical independence line than the FLNC-UC.

On August 6, 2026, during a press conference for the newspaper Corse-Matin, the FLNC implicitly threatened non-Corsicans who would settle on the island, openly radicalizing its discourse.

At the international level, the FLNC supports the causes of Irish and Basque nationalists and supports the Palestinian national movement.

== History ==
=== Foundation and objectives ===
The first FLNC was created from a merger of Ghjustizia Paolina and the Fronte Paesanu Corsu per Liberazione, the two largest Corsican armed organizations.

The FLNC carried out its first attacks on the night of 4 May 1976 with 21 bombs exploding in Ajaccio, Bastia, Sartène, Porto-Vecchio and other Corsican towns. The majority of the targets were public buildings and offices of civil servants. On 5 May the FLNC formally announced its existence when it issued a bilingual manifesto which also claimed responsibility for the previous night's attacks.

The manifesto contained six demands:

- The recognition of the national rights of the Corsican people.
- The removal of all instruments of French colonialism – including the French Army and colonists.
- The setting up of a popular democratic government which would express the will and the needs of the Corsican people.
- The confiscation of "colonial" estates.
- Agrarian reform to fulfill the aspirations of farmers, workers and intellectuals and rid the country of all forms of exploitation.
- The right to self-determination of the Corsican people.

=== 2014 to present ===
In 2014, the FLNC-Union of Combattants (FLNC-Unione di i Cumbattenti, FLNC-UC), the largest successor to the original FLNC at that time, announced the cessation of its armed struggle. This was followed by the FLNC of 22 October (FLNC 22 Uttrovi, FLNC-22U) in 2016. Nevertheless, a number of minor splinter groups have so far emerged and are still active. The FLNC-22U warned in 2016 that any attacks on Corsica by ISIL will be met with swift retaliation.

On 2 March 2022, Yvan Colonna, a member of the FLNC that was arrested for his alleged role in the 1998 assassination of Claude Érignac, was put in a coma in prison after being assaulted by an Islamic Cameroonian-born inmate for "disrespecting Muhammad." Colonna would die of his wounds on March 21, 2022, resulting in rioting and unrest across the island. The French interior ministry then floated the idea of political autonomy to Corsica to defuse the situation, with the FLNC-22U and FLNC-UC announcing they would jointly resume their armed campaign if said autonomy is not granted. On 21 March 2023, exactly one year after the death of Colonna, the FLNC-UC and FLNC-22U signed a joint press release where they declared a return to armed conflict and claimed 17 attacks.

In October 2023 explosions rocked secondary residences and under-construction villas across Corsica, with pro-FLNC slogans being spray-painted nearby.

In January 2024, antisemitic and anti-French graffiti appeared in Corsica, it is alleged that supporters of the FLNC may had sprayed the graffiti, although it is likely this is not a representation of any FLNC organization.
