= Charles Pieri =

Corsican guerilla leader

- Carlu Pieri

Leader of the FLNC-Union of Combatants
- In office 23 December 1999 – February 2009
- Preceded by: Position established
- Succeeded by: FLNC-UC army council

Co-leader of the FLNC-Canal Historique
- In office 25 November 1990 – 23 December 1999 Serving with François Santoni until 8 September 1998
- Preceded by: Position established
- Succeeded by: Position abolished

Personal details
- Born: 17 April 1950 (age 76) Bastia, Corsica, France
- Party: Nazione
- Other political affiliations: Muvimentu Corsu per l'Autodeterminazione (1983–1987); A Cuncolta Naziunalista (1987–1998); A Cuncolta Indipendentista (1998–2000); Indipendenza (2000–2009)
- Children: 2

Charles Pieri (Corsican: Carlu Pieri; born 17 April 1950) is a Corsican politician and guerrilla leader who served as co-leader of the FLNC-Canal Historique, one of the two leaders of its political wing, A Cuncolta Naziunalista, and the founding leader of the FLNC-Union of Combatants.

Known in Corsica as "u vecchju" (the old man) and "omu di l'ombra" (man of shadows), he involved himself in the Corsican nationalist movement in the early 1980s, joining the National Liberation Front of Corsica (FLNC). He quickly rose the ranks and became the leader of the FLNC's Borgo-Lucciana brigade. Known for his militant and violent attitude, Pieri opposed the FLNC's involvement in the Defferre accords, and in 1982 broke the ceasefire put in place by the organisation to allow for negotiations by attacking a Foreign Legion outpost, killing one. This resulted in his imprisonment soon after, which he escaped from in 1984 by sawing off a window and climbing a rope over the prison wall. Pieri rose to power with the collapse of the FLNC in 1988–1990, in which he and François Santoni, both dissident FLNC leaders who withdrew their brigades from the FLNC's command structure, ousted Alain Orsoni from the leadership of A Cuncolta Naziunalista, the FLNC's political wing, and placed themselves in charge. These two men also founded and co-led the FLNC-Canal Historique (FLNC-CS), a violent and militant guerrilla force which conducted attacks against French forces and Orsoni's FLNC-Canal Habituel. Pieri would later merge the FLNC-CS with various competing organisations to create the FLNC-Union of Combatants. In recent years, Pieri has gained significant media attention due to multiple allegations of his connections to the Corsican mafia and his inflammatory statements on social media.

== Early activism and membership in the FLNC ==
Charles Pieri was born on 17 April 1950 to a working-class family in Bastia. He studied philosophy in university for two years before becoming a member of the French Democratic Confederation of Labour and working in Bastia's public housing office. Seeing the discrimination against Corsicans in the housing sector, Pieri embraced Corsican nationalism, and in the early 1980s he joined the ranks of the National Liberation Front of Corsica (FLNC).

Pieri joined the FLNC during the Defferre process, a period in which the FLNC remained on ceasefire to oversee a government plan for Corsican autonomy. Pieri, who had quickly risen to the role of leader in the FLNC's Borgo-Lucciana brigade, was dissatisfied with the idea of government negotiations. One of the main points of contention during the Defferre process was the presence of the Foreign Legion on the island. The Foreign Legion was being used by the government as a military force to counter the FLNC during the Corsican conflict, and many Foreign Legion members were accused of war crimes such as torture (French authorities were found guilty of torturing Corsican political prisoners by the European Court of Human Rights in 1992) and some had been punished for civilian killings. For example, Foreign Legion members based in Corte murdered two civilians in the town of Bustanico in late 1976. Many Corsican nationalists wanted the Foreign Legion removed from Corsica, while government officials wanted to keep them as security forces in case of further war. This disagreement caused the FLNC to break ceasefire and withdraw from the Defferre process. On 11 February 1982, Pieri personally carried out the attack which broke the ceasefire: an attack on the Sorbo-Ocagnano Foreign Legion post, which killed one Legionnaire.

Pieri was arrested on 24 March 1982 for the Sorbo-Ocagnano attack. In prison, he met Francis Mariani, a prominent member of the Brise de Mer mafia. The two gained national fame when they escaped from Bastia's Sainte-Claire prison together on 22 January 1984. A guard, likely an undercover member of the FLNC, got Pieri and Mariani out of their shared cell and brought them to the prison's third floor, where they sawed out a window and threw a rope over the prison wall, which they used to climb out. Some nationalists and other figures, including François Santoni, claim that Mariani and Pieri became close friends and associates after this incident. Pieri denies this. Pieri was acquitted in 1988 as part of a wider amnesty for Corsican nationalists.

== Leadership of the FLNC-Canal Historique ==
=== Foundation ===
Upon the re-election of François Mitterrand to the position of President of France in 1988, the FLNC announced another ceasefire and a rapprochement with the French government for negotiations. This eventually became the Joxe accords, named for Interior Minister Pierre Joxe. Pieri, like in 1981, was highly critical of this process, and in fact withdrew his brigade from the FLNC in late 1988. Pieri became the leading voice against the Joxe process in Haute-Corse, working alongside dissident Gravona brigade leader François Santoni, who had become his counterpart in Corse-du-Sud. Pieri and Santoni together ousted Alain Orsoni, a pro-ceasefire moderate, from his seat as leader of A Cuncolta Naziunalista, the political wing of the FLNC. Pieri and Santoni's brigades, alongside multiple other dissident brigades, including Jean-Michel Rossi's Balagne brigade and Pierre Alessandri's Cargèse-Sagone brigade, were united into the FLNC-Canal Historique (FLNC-CS) in November 1990.

Pieri is often seen as the secondary aggressor in the ensuing Fratricidal War of the 1990s against Alain Orsoni's FLNC-Canal Habituel, only behind is comrade-in-arms François Santoni. Pieri's grip on and strict rule of the Haute-Corse sector of the FLNC-CS got him labelled a "strongman" by many of his opponents. He also oversaw an on-and-off alliance between the FLNC-CS and Resistenza, an armed group led by Pierre Poggioli and the military wing of the Corsican National Alliance.

=== Tralonca peace campaign ===
According to Santoni, Pieri engaged in confidential negotiations with interior minister Charles Pasqua to attempt to organise a peace settlement two years before the 1996 Tralonca peace campaign. While evidence for these supposed secret negotiations is lacking, Pasqua and the FLNC-CS briefly exchanged dialogue publicly in a series of open letters between the two of them in November and December 1994, the most famous being Pasqua's "A mes compatriotes" (to my compatriots), in which he discusses his own Corsican identity and responds positively to the FLNC-CS requesting political progress in exchange for a partial military ceasefire. This would become the basis for the Tralonca peace campaign just over a year later.

Pieri and Santoni publicly got along well as co-leaders, but privately the two disagreed and argued frequently. Santoni, despite being primarily a militarist, was chosen by himself and Pieri to be the primary representative of the FLNC-CS and its political wing, A Cuncolta Naziunalista, in the Tralonca peace campaign. This was presented to the public as a rational decision made by the two men together, but privately, Pieri heavily disagreed with Santoni's direction of the peace progress, and Santoni stated to him that he only truly believed in a peaceful outcome "for two weeks".

On 1 July 1996, during the Tralonca peace process, Pieri was the victim of an assassination attempt in Bastia. Guerrillas from the FLNC-5 May, the successor to the FLNC-Canal Habituel, placed a large carbomb under his vehicle, which he was occupying with Pierre Lorenzi. Lorenzi died immediately upon the detonation of the bomb, but Pieri survived, although he lost part of his hearing and his right eye.

=== Conflict with Santoni and Armata Corsa ===
The Tralonca peace campaign came to an end in October 1996 following a large-FLNC-CS bomb attack on the town hall of Bordeaux, the city in which Prime Minister Alain Juppé was mayor. Pieri was accused of orchestrating this attack to end the peace process by François Santoni. Santoni did not believe in the validity of the Tralonca process, but argued it should've been honoured "on principle". This marked the beginning of a long-standing conflict between Pieri and Santoni. In June 1998, A Cuncolta Naziunalista was re-organised into A Cuncolta Indipendentista, a move Santoni claimed to be a power grab by Pieri. Santoni officially resigned from both Cuncolta and the FLNC-CS in September 1998, leaving Pieri as the sole leader.

Pieri was the target of multiple smear campaigns by Santoni, who claimed he committed extortion, worked alongside the Corsican mafia, engaged in unsanctioned negotiations with Charles Pasqua and the French government, and personally ordered the assassination of Robert Sozzi, a Historique who was killed by fellow Historiques after being labelled a "traitor" by his internal opponents. The veracity of Santoni's claims are still being debated today. Santoni published a book, "Pour Solde de Tout Compte" (On All Accounts), a book which sold out across Corsica, which allegedly exposed Pieri's networks with the mafia in the FLNC-CS's Bastia brigade, which was directly under Pieri's control. Also in the book, Santoni and Jean-Michel Rossi, a former FLNC-CS brigade leader which defected to Santoni's side, denounced Pieri's supposed cult of personality and the so-called "Italian leanings" of Pieri and his lawyer, Jean-Guy Talamoni. "Italian" was an apparent insult from Santoni. These claims of extortion and mafia collusion reached the police, who searched his home in late 1998 and discovered a "large arsenal" of weapons. Extortion charges were dropped, but Pieri was arrested for possession of illegal firearms and sentenced to five years in prison.

Pieri and Santoni's conflict became violent upon the creation of Armata Corsa by Santoni in June 1999. A number of dissident FLNC-CS members and other nationalists joined the organisation, including Jean-Michel Rossi, formerly under Pieri's command as brigade leader for the Balagne area. Pieri and Talamoni, whose army was stuck between different armed conflicts with the French government, Fronte Ribellu (a group which split from the FLNC-CS in 1995), the FLNC-5 May, and Armata Corsa, sought to mend the fractured nationalist movement and organised the Migliacciaru accords in March 1999, which was signed by every faction of the nationalist movement except Armata Corsa. This was the basis for the foundation of the FLNC-Union of Combatants in December of the same year.

== Leadership of the FLNC-UC ==
Pieri's role in the FLNC-Union of Combatants, since its inception, was increasingly being sidelined by his political counterpart and lawyer, Jean-Guy Talamoni. A major reason for this was Pieri's criminal status; he led the organisation from jail following his 1998 arrest and struggled to maintain his grip on power. This put Pieri in a position where most of his leadership was simply on paper, and he became sort of a spiritual leader.

Pieri had become well known to the authorities, yet many saw him as untouchable for anything other than his weapons charge due to his connections to some Corsican police and widespread government corruption on the island making processes inefficient. Interior minister Jean-Pierre Chevènement held a disdain for him, and his influence on the broader Corsican nationalist movement was one of the factors in his resignation. He was the subject of a government inquiry opened in 2003, while he was in prison. Interior minister Nicolas Sarkozy viewed him as a great adversary, and vowed that he would "take down" Pieri for financial crimes "like Al Capone".

Pieri was arrested and sentenced in May 2005 to 10 years in prison for embezzlement, money laundering, and numerous other financial crimes. This was moved to an eight-year sentence following a judicial appeal. Pieri would spend the next 10 years in and out of prison; he was released from prison with semi-liberty in 2009, then given parole in 2010, but was arrested again in June 2011 for possession of weapons and false documents and forced to serve the remaining eight months of his sentence in prison. Upon his release, he was arrested again in July 2013 on another illegal weapons charge, and finally released in 2015. Being in prison repeatedly caused his status as leader to diminish, and by the creation of the Unified FLNC, the position was seemingly replaced by an army council of multiple leaders, similar to the group's political wing, Corsica Libera.

== Controversies ==
=== Mafia collusion ===
Charles Pieri has been accused by law enforcement and those opposed to him of collusion with the Corsican mafia, specifically the Brise de Mer gang. In 1984, Pieri escaped prison with the group's leader, Francis Mariani. François Santoni claims Mariani and Pieri became close personal friends, and alleges that Pieri's Bastia brigade of the FLNC-CS engaged in a number of dealings with the Brise. Pieri has always denied this. Police alleged that he and members of the Brise committed embezzlement together throughout the late 1990s. Notably, Brise members shot and killed François Santoni at the height of the FLNC-UC's war with Armata Corsa, although Santoni feuded with the mafia independently of this. Allegations of Pieri's collusion with the mafia continue to this day.

=== Embezzlement of finances ===
Pieri has been arrested for large-scale embezzlement with money from numerous businesses he used as a front for money laundering. Pieri carried his money exclusively in cash (which he claimed to be a "Corsican cultural value") and held stakes in various companies, including large hotels in Corsica and abroad, gambling rooms, and sports teams (notably SC Bastia, which the Historiques had a close relationship with). He also controlled many companies, such as the "Bastia Securità" private security firm, which he co-owned with Santoni until his departure from the FLNC-CS in 1998. Some hotels and car rental services were secretly run entirely by Pieri. Some companies were opened in the name of his wife or daughter. Revenue from all of these sources were transferred to the FLNC-CS, but according to Santoni, Pieri would keep this money for himself and run a "mafia-style" organisation out of the FLNC-CS's Bastia brigade. Pieri became famous in Bastia for his riches.

=== Offensive facebook post to Dominique Érignac ===
On 11 February 2018, upon the 20th anniversary of the assassination of Claude Érignac, Pieri posted on a Facebook account named "Di l'altu pianu" (Corsican for "from the high ground") an inflammatory statement comparing Érignac's widow Dominique to French women who had sexual relations with Nazi soldiers in World War II. Pieri's home was searched, and after a short trial, he was forced to pay Dominique Érignac €15,000.
