= FLNC-5 May =

Corsican guerrilla group

National Liberation Front of Corsica of 5 May
- Fronte di Liberazione Naziunale di a Corsica di 5 Maghju
- Founding leader: Jo Peraldi
- Founded: 5 May 1996
- Dates active: 5 May 1996-23 December 1999
- Split from: FLNC-Canal Habituel
- Merged into: FLNC-Union of Combatants
- Active regions: Corsica
- Ideology: Corsican nationalism
- Wars: Corsican conflict

The National Liberation Front of Corsica of 5 May (Corsican: Fronte di Liberazione Naziunale di a Corsica di 5 Maghju; abbreviated FLNC-5 May, FLNC-5M, or FLNC-05/05) was a Corsican nationalist paramilitary and guerrilla organisation.

The FLNC-5M formed from a split within the FLNC-Canal Habituel (Canale Abituale, FLNC-CA) due to the decision of the group to pursue disarmament and a political path for Corsican autonomy and eventual independence. Many members of the FLNC-CA were dissatisfied with autonomy and wanted to continue using armed struggle as the primary means to achieve total Corsican independence. At the same time, many in the group wished to retaliate against the FLNC-Canal Historique for their assassinations of prominent Habituels. Thus, on the day the disarmament announcement was given, a group of Habituels broke away from the FLNC-CA and declared the FLNC-5M.

The FLNC-5M carried out bombing campaigns against both the French government and assaults on members of the FLNC-Canal Historique. The most notable action of the FLNC-5M was the sheltering of Yvan Colonna, a prominent member of the isolated Cargèse-Sagone brigade wanted for the assassination of prefect Claude Érignac. Colonna was considered the most wanted man in France at the time.

The FLNC-5M made peace with the FLNC-Canal Historique in 1999 and became a founding member of the FLNC-Union of Combatants in December of that year.

== History ==
=== Divisions within the FLNC-Canal Habituel ===
The FLNC-Canal Habituel was created in October 1990 following a split within the original FLNC. The Habituels wanted to pursue peace with the French government and work towards a political solution for Corsican autonomy while the rival split, the FLNC-Canal Historique, wanted to continue using armed struggle as the primary means for direct independence. The FLNC-Canal Habituel attempted to remain part of the Joxe accords, which were peace negotiations and a plan for Corsican autonomy, until 1992, when the negotiations had almost concluded. The Habituels officially broke ceasefire on 10 August 1992 following what they called "government inaction".

Following the end of the ceasefire, many in the group, centred around Habituel leader Alain Orsoni, maintained their stance regarding autonomy rather than direct independence. However, a growing portion of the group believed direct independence with or without gradual autonomy should be the main goal of the organisation. Further tensions rose within the group by the mid-1990s as many prominent Habituels had died in the conflict with the FLNC-Canal Historique. Total disarmament had then become a popular notion with the majority autonomist faction of the FLNC-Canal Habituel, and the idea was presented at a congress for the Movement for Self-Determination (the political wing of the FLNC-Canal Habituel) in March 1996. The nationalist faction, most of whom were opposed to this, created their own political party, Corsica Viva, on 24 March 1996. Nationalist Habituel Jo Peraldi was chosen as leader.

=== Foundation ===
After deliberation, the FLNC-Canal Habituel announced on 5 May 1996, the 20th anniversary of the original FLNC's foundation, their intent to disarm completely in order to pursue a political solution to the conflict and to prevent more deaths in the feud with the Historiques. At the exact same time as this conference, Habituels against disarmament, most of whom were members of the Corsica Viva party, carry out a spontaneous series of bomb attacks in Ajaccio before holding their own press conference in the nearby mountains, calling themselves the "FLNC of 5 May". They also declare their intent to "occupy the field of armed struggle" left "vacant" by the FLNC-Canal Habituel.

=== 1996-1998 ===
The FLNC-5M carried out a series of unclaimed bomb attacks for the last six months of 1996, seizing most of the arms and weapons from the FLNC-Canal Habituel before the latter group could properly disarm.

On 1 July, FLNC-Canal Historique leader Charles Pieri and president of A Cuncolta Naziunalista Pierre Lorenzi were the victim of a carbomb attack from the FLNC-5M. Lorenzi was killed, but Pieri survived, although he lost his right eye and part of his hearing. This occurred during the Tralonca peace campaign, a failed attempt for peace between the FLNC-Canal Historique and the French government.

The first claimed attack by the FLNC-5M occurred on 12 January 1997. Four villas in Porto-Vecchio, the construction of which had finished the day before, were destroyed simultaneously by large bombs. The FLNC-5M released a press conference following this action where the attacks were claimed and the organisation denounced twelve recently arrested members of the FLNC-Canal Historique, denouncing their "mafia practices" and "fascist rhetoric".

FLNC-5M attacks continued throughout 1997. On 30 July of that year, the FLNC-5M held a press conference in the maquis where they asked prime minister Lionel Jospin to "clarify his position on the Corsican nation". This occurred a week after a visit to Corsica by interior minister Jean-Pierre Chevènement, who made inflammatory statements regarding the "regressive" politics of Corsica. In the same statement, the FLNC-5M also called for a government-recognised statute on the Corsican people, a Corsican development plan, transparency for funding sources for Corsican government officials, and the teaching of the Corsican language in all years of school.

=== Assassination of Claude Érignac and sheltering of Yvan Colonna ===
On 6 February 1998, Claude Érignac, prefect of Corsica, was assassinated by members of the Cargèse-Sagone brigade, an isolated Corsican nationalist formation previously part of the original FLNC. The FLNC-5M's leader, Jo Peraldi, had received information from a friend regarding a potential police operation on 21 May 1998 to arrest three men involved in the assassination. The FLNC-5M's leader, Jo Peraldi, informed the head of the commando, Yvan Colonna, and sent a group of FLNC-5M guerrillas to help him flee from the police action. Colonna was dressed as an old woman in a headscarf and brought to the mountains by the guerrillas. Peraldi and the FLNC-5M materially supported Colonna during his four-year evasion of police, a period which earned him the title "the most wanted man in France". Numerous members of the FLNC-5M and its political wing, Corsica Viva, were arrested during this period as a harsh crackdown ensued following Érignac's death.

=== 1998-1999 ===
In September 1998, François Santoni left the FLNC-Canal Historique, citing political polarisation, the failure of the Tralonca peace campaign, and alleged mafia influence in Charles Pieri's inner circle. Santoni continuously antagonised the FLNC-CS and Pieri in multiple interviews and public appearances, and he even wrote a series of books detailing Pieri's alleged mafia dealings aided by his lawyer and Corsica Nazione leader Jean-Guy Talamoni. Fearing yet another split and further conflict, FLNC-CS officials organised the so-called "Fiumorbo Nationalist Collective" in December 1998 to spur reunification of the violently feuding Corsican nationalist movements. The Fiumorbo region of Corsica, located on the east side of the island, is considered to be a historic area for Corsican nationalism, as it is the birthplace of some of the earliest anti-colonial organisations on the island. The FLNC-5M, after the arrest of numerous high-ranking members of the group and conflict between Peraldi and Santoni, responded positively to the prospect of peace.

On 17 March 1999, the Fiumorbo Nationalist Collective organised a meeting in the village of Migliacciaru in Prunelli-di-Fiumorbo of the various Corsican nationalist organisations in order to create a dialogue for peace. Present at the meeting were representatives from the following:

- The FLNC-CS
- The FLNC-CS's political wing A Cuncolta Indipendentista
- The FLNC-5M
- The FLNC-5M's political wing Corsica Viva
- Fronte Ribellu
- Rinnovu Naziunale, a political party created from Corsica Viva dissidents in 1998 (Rinnovu would later become the political wing of the FLNC-22 October)
- Union of the Corsican People
- The Corsican National Alliance, political wing of the armed group Resistenza, on ceasefire since 1995

At 3:00pm on that day, these representatives signed the Migliacciaru Peace Accords, which committed them to mending the fractured nationalist movement and ended the Years of Lead period. Notably absent from this meeting was Santoni's Presenza Naziunale political party, a group he created with fellow-FLNC-CS dissident Jean-Michel Rossi following his departure from the group in September. In June 1999, Santoni and Rossi created the extremist Armata Corsa guerrilla group and began waging open war with the newly formed "Fiumorbo coalition" of the FLNC-CS, FLNC-5M, and Fronte Ribellu.

Being attacked from two ends by the French authorities and Armata Corsa, the Fiumorbo coalition had to find a way to solve the incoming crisis. Some members of On 23 December 1999, the three members of the coalition, alongside Clandestinu, a small Corsican nationalist urban guerrilla group formed months prior and operating only in Ajaccio, announced the creation of the FLNC-Union of Combatants and an indefinite ceasefire with the French government. This coincided with an opening of dialogue by prime minister Lionel Jospin to various nationalist elected officials. This coinsided with a fourth attempt of Corsican peace talks, following the 1981-1982 Defferre accords, the 1991-1992 Joxe accords, and the 1996 Tralonca peace campaign.

== Structure ==
The FLNC-5M was under the direct and uniform control of the group's leader, Jo Peraldi.

Corsica Viva was the group's political wing. Many former Habituel institutions, including Jean-Félix Acquaviva's Ghjuventù Paolina student union, was under the influence or control of the FLNC-5M.
