= Cargèse-Sagone brigade =

Cargèse-Sagone Brigade
- Brigata Carghjese-Sagone
- Founder: Pierre Alessandri
- Leaders: Alain Ferrandi; Pierre Alessandri; Yvan Colonna
- Founded: May 1976 (as a brigade of the FLNC); Late 1991 (as an independent unit)
- Dates active: 1976-1999
- Dissolved: 21 May 1999
- Allegiance: National Liberation Front of Corsica (1976-1988); Dissident organisation (1988-1990); FLNC-Canal Historique (1990-1991); Independent (1991-1999)
- Active regions: greater Cargèse and Sagone regions Ajaccio
- Ideology: Corsican nationalism
- Wars: Corsican conflict: Assassination of Claude Érignac

The Cargèse-Sagone brigade (Corsican: brigata Carghjese-Sagone) was a Corsican nationalist military formation created during the Corsican conflict based mostly around the areas surrounding Cargèse and Sagone, as well as operating in the city of Ajaccio.

The brigade was initially created by the National Liberation Front of Corsica (FLNC) as one of the numerous brigades in its military structure. Upon the violent split of the FLNC and the onset of the feud between the FLNC-Canal Historique and FLNC-Canal Habituel, the Cargèse-Sagone brigade initially joined the Historiques before becoming neutral and largely becoming uninvolved in the so-called "Fratricidal War" between the two groups. The brigade was led primarily by Alain Ferrandi, with other leaders including Pierre Alessandri and Yvan Colonna. The most notable action of the group was the assassination of Claude Érignac, which resulted in the arrests of its leaders and the dismantling of the organisation.

== History ==
=== In the FLNC and FLNC-CS ===
The Cargèse-Sagone brigade was created in May 1976 alongside numerous other brigade formations of the National Liberation Front of Corsica. From 1976 to 1979, this brigade was represented in the FLNC's Direzione by the "Nodi" of Ajaccio. From 1979 to 1988, the group sent their brigade leader, Pierre Alessandri, to the Ghjunta, as did the other brigades within the FLNC.

The Cargèse-Sagone brigade became known for carrying out large-scale attacks in large quantities, earning the members of the group a reputation as elite professionals. François Santoni remarked that the group were "the elites of bomb-making, totally". In a 2007 report, an anonymous former FLNC member stated that the brigade members were "guys who never slacked off". The group first made headlines when, in September 1983, police found equipment and space for a large makeshift bomb factory at the bottom of a well on the property of shepherd Yvan Colonna, a prominent member of the brigade. Colonna's arrest was ordered, but he was not able to be caught by police who dropped his warrant soon after. Colonna was not the only member of the brigade to evade arrest successfully. The group routinely took advantage of the rugged, mountainous, inhospitable terrain around the area in which they operated, and police gave the area the nickname "the Bermuda Triangle".

Members of this brigade were relatively isolated compared to the other brigades of the FLNC. Police informants claimed the brigade "never operated on the same wavelength as the other brigades of the Front". When the FLNC began to collapse in 1988, the Cargèse-Sagone brigade hesitantly split from its parent organisation, alongside many other brigades. These brigades became the FLNC-Canal Historique (FLNC-CS) in November 1990.

=== Independence ===
The Cargèse-Sagone brigade gradually distanced itself from the FLNC-CS before becoming entirely independent of the group in late 1991. This was largely to stay clear of the FLNC-CS's war with the FLNC-Canal Habituel (FLNC-CA), a group led by Alain Orsoni led by the brigades of the FLNC which did not leave during the collapse. The brigade was heavily isolated and mysterious; a police officer referred to the group as "independents within the independence movement" in a 2007 report. The group's only interactions with the other armed organisations were contracts in which guerrilla leaders commissioned the elite bomb producers of the Cargèse brigade, a process French newspaper Le Monde called "operating in a feudal manner".

The group again made headlines in 1994 when the leaders of the group were accused of attempting to assassinate Pierre Poggioli, former leader of the FLNC, at the time in charge of his own political movement (the Corsican National Alliance) and armed movement (Resistenza). Alain Ferrandi, the main leader of the group, and Pierre Alessandri, leader and main advisor, were both arrested and questioned for this event. Yvan Colonna evaded arrest for a week before turning himself in. All three were released soon after.

On 6 February 1998, Prefect of Corsica Claude Érignac was assassinated by a commando of the Cargèse-Sagone brigade organised by Ferrandi and carried out by himself, Alessandri, and Colonna. This was the first murder of a French prefect since World War II and the most influential and powerful figure killed during the Corsican conflict. Ferrandi and Alessandri were arrested in a large police operation in Ajaccio on 21 May 1999, causing the brigade's dissolution. Colonna, with assistance from the FLNC-5 May, was disguised as an old woman with a headscarf and escaped from the area shortly before the operation occurred. Colonna evaded police for four years, becoming the most wanted man in France and the target of the largest manhunt in French history.
