= FLNC-May 21 =

Corsican nationalist militant organisation

National Liberation Front of Corsica - May 21
- Fronte di Liberazione Naziunale di a Corsica - Maghju 21
- Leader: Stéphane Ori (likely)
- Founded: 5 May 2021
- Dissolved: 29 March 2024 (likely)
- Split from: FLNC-Union of Combatants; FLNC-22 October
- Ideology: Corsican nationalism

The National Liberation Front of Corsica - May 21 (Corsican: Fronte di Liberazione Naziunale di a Corsica - Maghju 21; abbreviated FLNC-M21) was a Corsican nationalist militant organisation.

Formed on 5 May 2021 (hence the name May 21), the 45th anniversary of the creation of the National Liberation Front of Corsica, the organisation held a press conference announcing its existence that day where they claimed to have a membership drawn from "all splinters of the FLNC", sparking an investigation from the French government's anti-terrorism office. The group is implicated in very little armed actions, but are suspected of setting fire to a crane on a construction site in San-Martino-di-Lota 24 May 2021. The FLNC-M21 criticized the "mafia infection present in Corsican society" and was highly critical of the Pè a Corsica coalition in the Corsican assembly, accusing the group of "focusing too much on managing communities and not enough on building a nation".

The FLNC-M21 likely dissolved following the arrest of the group's supposed leader, Stéphane Ori, on 29 March 2024. Following protests from various Corsican nationalist political parties and allegations of torture by French authorities, Ori was released from prison on 29 October 2025, instead being monitored by police in Côte d'Azur.
