= Bernard Bonnet =

French civil servant

Bernard Bonnet (born 11 February 1948), French civil servant, is best known for being the first prefect since World War II to be convicted of an offense committed in the course of his duties, his role in the "Affair of the beach huts".

== Early career ==
Bernard Bonnet was born in Grünstadt, Germany, where his father, an army officer, was serving. He entered the French civil service as a tax inspector, a post he occupied for five years before being admitted to the prestigious École Nationale d'Administration (ENA) in the "Guernica" class of 1976. On graduation, he obtained a post at the Interior Ministry.

- chief-of-staff to the prefect of Vendée (1976–78)
- chief-of-staff to the prefect of the Pas-de-Calais (1978–79)
- secretary general of the prefecture of the Aude (1979–91)
- deputy prefect, responsible for security, at the regional prefecture of Corsica (1991–92)

== Prefect of the Pyrénées-Orientales ==
Bernard Bonnet was named as prefect of the Pyrénées-Orientales in 1993 by Charles Pasqua. He was strongly opposed to expressions of catalanism in the département, including the public use of the Catalan language, and his time in Perpignan has been described as "five years of absolute rule by a super-prefect" in the pseudonymous book Bernard Bonnet, un préfet chez les Catalans After his departure for Corsica, a fake death notice appeared in Catalan in L'Indépendant, the main local newspaper in Perpignan.

== Prefect of Corsica ==
Bernard Bonnet was named as prefect of Corsica by Jean-Pierre Chevènement on 9 February 1998, just three days after the assassination of his predecessor Claude Erignac. His role, as announced by Chevènement, was to "restore the state of law", and he quickly showed a firm hand against nationalist groups. He was particularly uncompromising in his use of Article 40 of the Code of Penal Procedure, which obliges civil servants to denounce any illegal activity of which they are aware.

His style brought protests from Corsican politicians, but were generally well received on mainland France. In a session of the Corsican Assembly on 31 October 1998, he was asked ironically by members of the Corsica Nazione group "when he was leaving": he replied that it would be "when your friends stop racketeering, when your friends stop the assassinations at village festivals, when your friends stop planting explosives."

== Affair of the beach huts ==
Bernard Bonnet's career came to an abrupt end in 1999 with the "affair of the beach huts" (French: affaire des paillotes). On the night of 19–20 April 1999, two illegally constructed beach restaurants were destroyed in an arson attack at Cala d'Orzo, south of Ajaccio. Bonnet initially suggested that the attack was a result of a disagreement between armed separatist groups (a common occurrence in Corsica at the time), but the police investigation quickly indicated that the fire had been started by a group of gendarmes from the elite Groupe de peloton de sécurité (GPS). A walkie-talkie, a compass, a blood-stained balaclava and several jerrycans which had contained petrol were discovered buried in the sand of the beach on 23 April, while a badly-burned patient had been anonymously admitted to the Rangueil University Hospital in Toulouse, transferred from the neighbouring military hospital.

Bonnet was arrested on 3 May and flown to Paris for questioning: he was held in prison on remand (détention préventive) for two months. After a trial in Ajaccio, he was found guilty of conspiracy to arson (complicité de destruction de biens appartenant à autrui par l'effet d'un incendie) on 10 January 2002 and sentenced to three years of imprisonment, two of which were suspended, and three years deprivation of his civil rights (privation des droits civiques).

Bonnet appealed against his conviction, first to the Court of Appeal in Bastia, which rejected the appeal on 15 January 2003, and then to the Court of Cassation, France's highest court, which rejected his petition on 13 October 2004. His request for a Presidential pardon was rejected by Jacques Chirac in March 2005. Nevertheless, Bonnet never returned to prison as he was granted probation (liberté conditionnelle) by a Paris judge on 9 June 2006, a decision confirmed on appeal on 12 October 2006. Neither was he ever sacked from the civil service: he was suspended after his arrest in May 1999, and retired on a normal pension in October 2006.

== Bibliography ==
Works by Bernard Bonnet:

- Préfet en Corse, Michel Lafon, 1999, 302pp, ISBN 2-84098-532-2.
- A vous de juger: Contre-enquête sur une affaire d'Etat en Corse, Flammarion, 2001, 484pp, ISBN 2-08-068224-5.
- Le sang et le pilori, L'Archipel, 2005, 332pp, ISBN 2-84187-735-3.

== Notes ==
Political offices
Preceded by	Prefect of Pyrénées-Orientales; 1993–1998	Succeeded by
Preceded by Claude Érignac	Prefect of Corse-du-Sud; Prefect of Corsica; 1998–	Succeeded by
