= Sagone =

Sagone may refer to:

- Sagone, Corsica, a town in Corsica
- Sagone (river), a river in Corsica
- Sagone, Samoa, a village on the island of Savai'i in Samoa
- Roman Catholic Diocese of Sagone, a diocese based in the city of Sagone, Corsica
- Torra di Sagone, a Genoese tower beside the Anse de Sagone in Corsica
