= Defferre accords =

The Defferre accords were a series of agreements and laws passed throughout 1981 and 1982 to give the island of Corsica greater autonomy from France, spearheaded by interior minister Gaston Defferre and president François Mitterrand. The first of the various laws and agreements on Corsican autonomy, the goals of the Defferre accords were to kickstart the process of devolving certain powers to regional governments across France (established in other regions of the country in 1986), and more importantly bring peace to Corsica, at the time struggling with an intense guerrilla conflict between French authorities and the National Liberation Front of Corsica (FLNC).

The agreements resulted in a number of institutional advancements for Corsica, including the re-opening of the University of Corsica Pasquale Paoli, the amnesty of hundreds of FLNC political prisoners, and the creation of the Corsican Assembly, a local governing body capable of making legislative and some executive management decisions for the island. Much of this resulted from dialogue within the FLNC, and many in opposition to Defferre and Mitterrand referred to these talks and agreements as "a strategy of appeasement". The "Defferre Statute", a law passed to institute these agreements, was passed on 2 March 1982. Despite this, the FLNC broke their ceasefire in February 1982, shortly before this, due to the FLNC's perceived notion that the reforms had not gone far enough, and that Defferre was "ignoring" the demands of the Corsican nationalists.

== Background ==
=== Historical autonomy ===
Corsica under the third and fourth French republics had enjoyed a relative isolation from the government in Paris. De jure, Corsica was run like any other part of France at the time, but de facto, Corsica was distant from the politics of the mainland, and representatives of the French government in Corsica, like the prefect, often stayed out of Corsican political affairs. Corsica was instead mostly run by so-called clans, groups of families who established political control of towns and regions of the island, sometimed by force. Some clans, like the Rocca Serra clan, had political ties to the island dating back to feudal lordships in the 1500s. These clans would often feud, causing small localised conflicts and the emergence of a "vendetta culture" in Corsica, normalising the use of violence in Corsican political affairs. Clans in Corsica still have political power today, and members of prominent clans have served in local, regional, and national offices in recent history. Despite some attempts by Corsican deputies (notably Emmanuel Arène) to enforce French governmental policies in Corsica, real power remained in the Corsican general council and the mayors of the various towns on the island, and both entities were averse, and sometimes physically violent to, French authority.

By the 1900s, Corsica was slowly being brought into the sphere of metropolitan France. Large migrations, industrialization, and government subsidies allowed short-term economic growth in Corsica, causing many locals to adopt pro-French sentiment, not due to a shared national identity, but rather due to the economic growth from being a French territory. This was strengthened by the tragedy of World War I, which allowed Corsica and mainland France to share a sense of solidarity and pride due to the men from Corsica who fought in the war. After the war, many Corsicans became worried over the growing threat of Mussolini’s Italian Irredentism, as Corsica was included in the claims of many Italian irredentists. In December 1938, Violent protests broke out across the island between Italian irredentists and pro-French Corsicans. In Bastia, tens of thousands of Corsicans met and swore the now infamous Oath of Bastia, where they declared: “Before the world, with all our soul, on our glories, on our graves, on our cradles, we swear to live and die French”. After the outbreak of World War II, many Corsicans saw the war with Germany on the mainland as mostly irrelevant, fearing a possible Italian invasion more than a German one. Many Corsicans, despite the wish to remain French, largely still did not feel a national connection to mainland France due to a separate linguistic, historical, and cultural identity. Upon the fall of France in 1940, the new Vichy government made defending Corsica from the Italian threat a priority. Despite the insistence of French unity by Corsican citizens, many were only supportive of a French government to reject the idea of an Italian one. Corsican prefect Paul Balley stated: “a Corsican who claims to be French is demonstrating not so much loyalty to France as rejection of Italy”.

In November 1942, German and Italian soldiers dismantled Vichy France, and Corsica came under Italian administration. A widespread Corsican resistance movement soon popped up, led mostly locally until the introduction of the National Front to the island. General Charles de Gaulle sent Corsican Fred Scamaroni to unify the maquis under his leadership, but he was captured by Italian police and tortured until he committed suicide on 19 March 1943. After the fall of Mussolini, many Italian soldiers joined the Corsican resistance and drove the Germans out of Corsica along with an allied invasion force. The invasion of Italy and the Corsican National Front being largely local and separate from the mainland one caused many Corsicans to redefine their relationship with France. By January 1943, reports began to reach Laval that support for a French government in Corsica had “drained away”. Corsica was the first department of France to be liberated, yet the French government maintained that Calvados was the first, demonstrating to many Corsicans the supposed indifference of the French towards Corsica.

Corsicans under the Fourth Republic held a mostly positive view of Charles de Gaulle, seeking economic interests from him. During the Algerian War and other colonial conflicts of the 1960s, Corsicans were drafted heavily, making up 22 percent of French colonial forces despite only being around 2% of all French citizens. This was done to bind Corsica to France through military service, though it also created a sense of disdain amongst Corsicans. “Operation Corse”, an invasion of Corsica by soldiers attempting to reinstate de Gaulle into power, was supported by many Corsicans, and resistance to the landings were next to none.

=== Beginning of the Fifth Republic and the end of local government ===
Charles de Gaulle’s administration during the Fifth Republic caused relations between Corsicans and France to sour greatly. De Gaulle’s opposition to regionalism and the establishment of a “strong state” caused Corsicans, who had been enjoyed Corsican self-government for the longest time, to feel betrayed by de Gaulle. funding for regional projects in Corsica dried up, and Corsicans felt that their island had become an oversight to the government in Paris.

The Corsican attitude towards de Gaulle and his government reached a new low in 1959, when the nationally-owned SOMIVAC corporation (Société pour la mise en valeur de la Corse) began assigning land in the fertile eastern plains of Corsica to Pied-noir wine growers, recently displaced from Algeria due to the Algerian war. Many Corsicans decried this action as "settler colonialism", similar to the French policy in Algeria.

Upon the creation of French regions in 1960, Corsica was placed in the Provence-Côte d'Azur region as a single department. Many Corsicans disliked this status, instead wanting Corsica to be a region of its own. This accelerated the growing autonomist movement greatly, and resulted in the creation of the Corsican Regionalist Front in 1966.

The FRC, while not the first Corsican militant organisation (The 29 November Movement, a small nationalist organisation, had formed in 1959 following the SOMIVAC affair), it had grown into the largest. A split in this group over ideological differences resulted in the creation of the Corsican Regionalist Action in April 1967, led by brothers Edmond and Max Simeoni. Unlike the FRC, a firmly leftist organization, the ARC included Corsican separatists across the political spectrum.

In October 1974, a law was passed creating a Corsican region, severing the island from Provence-Côte d'Azur, and splitting the island into two departments, Haute-Corse and Corse-du-Sud. This was an attempt from many in the French government to appease the autonomists and the (then smaller) nationalists in the hopes that this would diffuse the rapid growth of the movements. Although a small amount were satisfied with the change, many autonomists, especially those within the ARC, realised the government was able to institute reforms, and began pushing for further autonomy for the island of Corsica.

=== Beginning of the Corsican conflict ===
In August of 1975, Edmond Simeoni led a group of armed ARC militants to a pied-noir owned wine cellar in Aléria, a town on Corsica's eastern plain, and occupied it forcefully. Soon after, interior minister Michel Poniatowski ordered the gendarmes in the area to assume battle position. Gendarmes arrived with armed vehicles and heavy weaponry, and a standoff ensued between the ARC and the gendarmes. Two gendarmes were killed and an ARC militant lost his left leg from grenade fire. This, coupled with the fierce military repression of multiple protests which occurred following this, caused many Corsicans to lose hope in cooperation with the French government. Due to this, most autonomists had then adopted the position of complete separatism from France, becoming Corsican nationalists.

In May of 1976, the National Liberation Front of Corsica formed and began waging a large-scale guerrilla conflict in Corsica. Upon its creation, the FLNC committed numerous bomb attacks across Corsica and released a manifesto titled the Manifesto of May 5th. This outlined key demands of the organization and notably included demands involving government co-operation in the event of a peace process. These included:

- Recognition of the national rights of the Corsican people
- Establishment of a democratic, popular power in Corsica
- A right to self-determination after a transitional period of three years during which the administration will be equal between the nationalist force and the occupying force, allowing for the Corsican people to democratically choose between French or Corsican administration

Other important demands of the FLNC at the time included the re-opening of the University of Corsica, closed by the French army after the invasion of Corsica in 1768, linguistic rights for Corsican government, education, and business institutions, and the protection of Corsican coasts from pollution and large construction projects building vacation homes and tourist attractions.

The administration of Valery Giscard d'Estaing took a hostile position against the guerrillas, using police repression and counter-insurgency tactics, creating various departments within French military and intelligence departments to address what he called "the Corsican problem".

This tactic of repression caused resentment amongst Corsicans towards the government in Paris, leading to the FLNC experiencing a boom in popular support and membership. Many in France, particularly leftists, began criticizing Giscard, then known as a "great reformer", for his repressive policies and his staunch refusal to institute further reforms, feeling his actions in Corsica were hypocritical. Giscard's government instead framed the conflict in a purely economic sense, stating in a 1978 letter to Prime Minister Raymond Barre that Corsica's underdeveloped and poor populace is the reason for the unrest, and proposed a number of economic reforms to fix the situation.

== Process ==
=== 1981 presidential election ===
Following an assault on the town of Bastelica in early 1980 by the FLNC against pro-French Corsican guerrillas in the town, the conflict in Corsica had become one of the most prominent media and political discussions in France. As the 1981 presidential election rolled around, Socialist Party candidate François Mitterrand beginning campaigning with peace in Corsica as a platform. On Mitterrand's official platform, point 54 was dedicated to Corsica, in which Mitterrand promised for an amnesty for jailed FLNC political prisoners, the abolition of the recently instituted State Security Court (A special, more strict court created after the Algerian war to prosecute those accused of "upending the security of the state", used to jail many FLNC members in kangaroo courts), the recognition of Corsica's "special status" through the creation of decentralised government institutions with "democratic expression" to "empower the islanders". This appealed to many members of the FLNC, who announced a "cessation of armed struggle" on 1 April in order to support the left's campaign for peace.

Mitterrand arrived in Furiani on 3 April for a campaign to a large crowd who had hung a hand-made banner on a stone wall reading "Mitterrand President". While in Furiani, Mitterrand spoke about his "answers" to the so-called "Corsican problem", promising to make a change from Giscard's policy of firmness and repression. At the same time as this rally, the FLNC announced a proper ceasefire truce and their commitment to work with Mitterrand's government.

From early on in the process, cracks began to show within the FLNC due to differing opinions on support for government cooperation. François Santoni, leader of the FLNC's Gravona brigade, operating near and within Ajaccio, fiercely opposed peace, and on 16 April 1981, organised and executed the attempted assassination of then president Giscard as he arrived at Ajaccio airport. A bomb was set to explode in the terminal as Giscard walked through, but the bomb exploded just out of range of Giscard, injuring 8 civilians and killing 1.

=== Peace process ===
On 10 May 1981, François Mitterrand was elected president. Almost immediately, reforms began to be worked on. The recently instituted government of prime minister Pierre Mauroy began drafting up plans to devolve certain authority to a larger Corsican government. The chief architect of this plan was interior minister Gaston Defferre, who, like Mitterrand, framed the issue of autonomy in Corsica as an issue of peace on the island, stating in an interview with France 3:

"On the contrary, I believe that a sufficiently advanced decentralization project, taking into account the originality of Corsica, the particular character of Corsica, should make it possible to consolidate national unity. For when those who claim autonomy or independence realize that within the framework of the French Republic they have obtained the possibility of expressing themselves, of making themselves heard, of having the Corsican language taught, of respecting Corsican traditions, then I am convinced that the causes of discord will disappear and, on the contrary, concord will return and national unity will be consolidated."

In June 1981, during talks of amnesty for FLNC prisoners, a prison revolt broke out amongst imprisoned FLNC militants in Fleury-Mérogis Prison, then populated with a large amount of Corsican nationalists arrested during the conflict. The revolting prisoners called for the release of two figures: Serge Cacciari, imprisoned following the Aleria standoff and accused of shooting a gendarme, and Alain Orsoni, a growing figure in Corsican nationalist circles and a prominent FLNC leader. Cacciari was released on 23 July.

On 4 August 1981, the government passed an amnesty law introduced by Defferre and Mitterrand releasing all FLNC prisoners accused of committing non-violent crimes. This was later amended to include violent crimes as well. This law resulted in the release of numerous FLNC members, including many important leaders like Alain Orsoni and Léo Battesti. This law also abolished the State Security Court.

Following a large grassroots movement, the University of Corsica properly organized a board of directors and student unions, close to the FLNC. In October 1981, professors were hired and a university council was established. The university officially reopened on 26 October 1981, and was granted official status by the state in March 1982.

In January 1981, debate opened for the newly drafted autonomy bill for Corsica. This bill, referred to as the "Defferre statute", gave Corsica considerable autonomy, including a legislature, regional elections, and language rights in government and education. Defferre, speaking to the National Assembly, stated that the project is already working as Corsica has "regained peace" as a result of promises for Corsicans to be able to "express themselves". This bill would pass the National Assembly soon after.

=== Break with the FLNC and completion of process ===
Despite the FLNC being largely satisfied with the outcomes of the process so far, a major point of contention was the presence of the Foreign Legion on the island. Early on in the Corsican conflict, the Foreign Legion was used as an easy tool to repress the Corsican guerrillas due to their bases across Corsica. During the peace process, the Foreign Legion was removed from the towns of Bonifacio and Corte, but they were allowed to remain at their bases in Calvi and Sorbo-Ocagnano. On 11 February 1982, Charles Pieri, leader of the Borgo brigade of the FLNC and disillusioned with the peace process, ordered an attack on the Foreign Legion barracks in Sorbo-Ocagnano. This caused an outcry from political figures across Corsica. Jean Senie, prefect of Haute-Corse, began pleading with the FLNC's legal representative in Haute-Corse, believing the peace process to be over and the autonomy law to be certainly rejected due to this aggression. French authorities responded with a string of arrests, including the arrest of Pieri. This caused the FLNC to formally break truce.

On 2 March 1982, the Defferre Statute officially became law, regardless of the FLNC breaking truce. This created the Corsican Assembly, elected by universal suffrage in a proportional representation system. The FLNC denounced this system, claiming autonomy did not go far enough.

== Aftermath ==
The first elections for the Corsican Assembly were held on 8 August 1982. The elections were unorganized, with 17 lists of mostly small parties. On the night of the election, the FLNC committed 90 bomb attacks in protest of the new institution. In the end, a loose coalition of left-wing parties created the first Corsican government, and Prosper Alfonsi was elected President of the Corsican Assembly.

The FLNC continued their armed campaign after this, with over 800 bombings recorded by authorities in 1983. High numbers of attacks were recorded each year after this, with the FLNC reaching their first peak of activity. Mitterrand returned to Corsica in 1983, claimed success for the Defferre accords, while also announcing his refusal to "separate the Corsican people from the French people".

Following Mitterrand's re-election in 1988, The FLNC called a very controversial truce to re-negotiate for further autonomy in Corsica. This time, dissent was even higher within the organisation, and an internal split began. Multiple brigades left the FLNC, alongside bands of common guerrilla fighters across the island, and created the FLNC-Canal Historique, and the remaining members (mostly political leaders) remained and created the FLNC-Canal Habituel. The Habituels continued the ceasefire and negotiations kickstarted by the original FLNC, resulting in the second Corsican autonomy agreement, the Joxe Accords, named for new interior minister Pierre Joxe.

== Results of the Defferre Accords ==
The Defferre Accords resulted in multiple advancements for Corsica:

- The creation of Corsican Assembly, elected by universal suffrage in a proportional vote, made up of 61 councillors
- Amnesty for FLNC political prisoners
- The re-opening of the University of Corsica
- The Council for Culture, Education, and Quality of Life and the Economic and Social Council, advisory bodies for the Corsican Assembly. These are dissolved following the Joxe Accords in 1992
- The creation of France 3 Corse, a regional television station
- Limited linguistic recognition in the Corsican government and University, widened in 1992 by the Joxe Accords
