= Vescovato, Haute-Corse =

Vescovato U Vescuvatu
- Commune
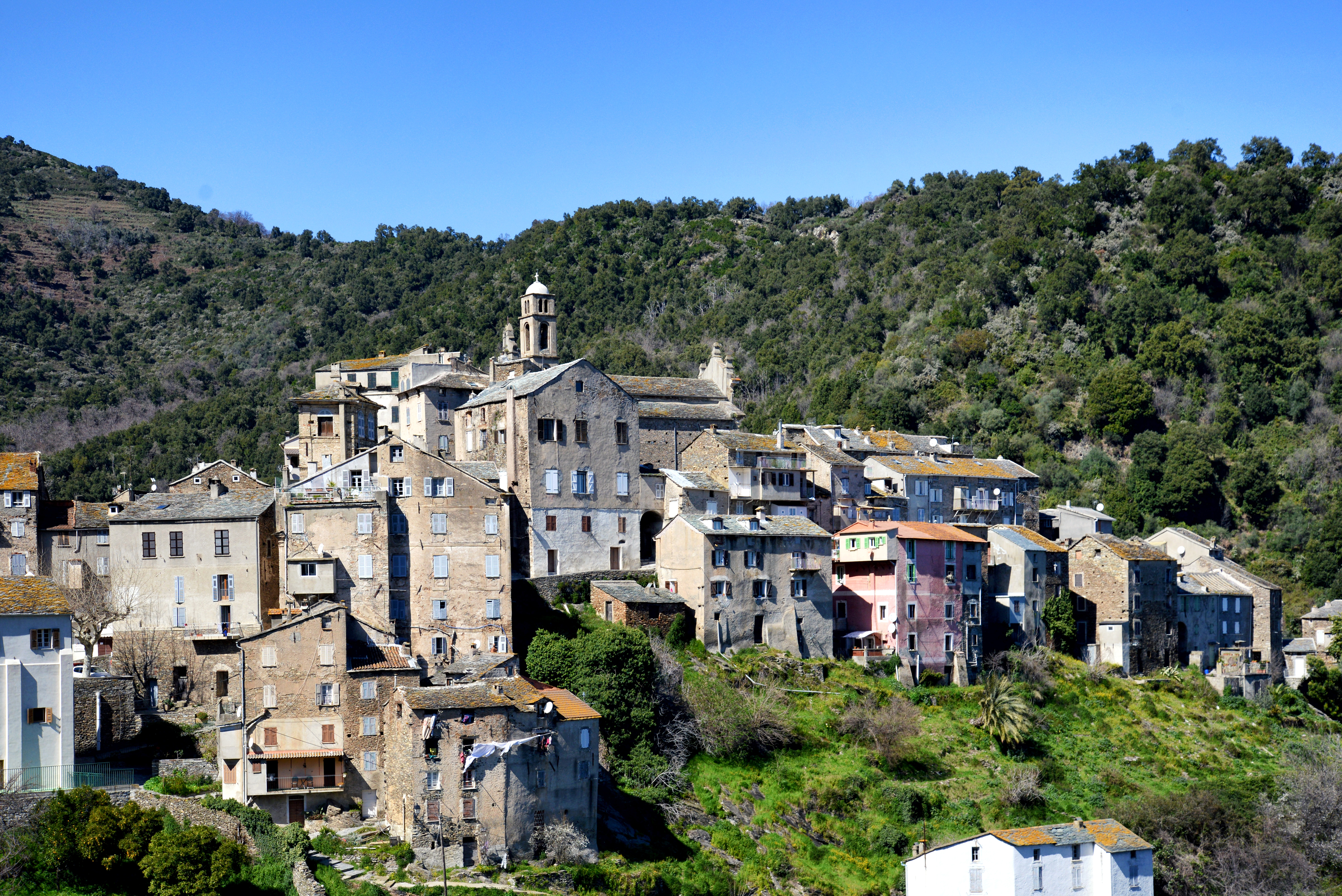
- A view of the village of Vescovato

- Coat of arms
- Location of Vescovato
- Location within France Location within Corsica
- Coordinates: 42°29′41″N 9°26′26″E
- Country: France
- Region: Corsica
- Department: Haute-Corse
- Arrondissement: Corte
- Canton: Casinca-Fumalto

Government
  - Mayor (2020–2026): Benoît Bruzi
- Area^{1}: 17.52 km^{2} (6.76 sq mi)
- Elevation: 140 m (460 ft)
- Highest elevation: 440 m (1,440 ft)
- Lowest elevation: 0 m (0 ft)
- Population (2023): 3,406
  - Density: 194.4/km^{2} (503.5/sq mi)
- Time zone: UTC+01:00 (CET)
  - Summer (DST): UTC+02:00 (CEST)
- INSEE/Postal code: 2B346 /20215
- ^{1} French Land Register data, which excludes lakes, ponds, glaciers > 1 km^{2} (0.386 sq mi or 247 acres) and river estuaries.

Vescovato (French pronunciation: [vɛskɔvato]; Corsican: U Viscuvatu) is a commune in the Haute-Corse department of France on the island of Corsica.

Its name derives from the Italian term for "bishopric". (Italian: vescovado) According to Lucien Auguste Letteron (a Corsican Historian), the name would originate from the Bishop of Mariana, Opizzu Cortincu (1218-1260 ?) who founded the new village.

== Population ==
Historical population
Year	Pop.	±% p.a.
1968	1,509	—
1975	2,040	+4.40%
1982	2,129	+0.61%
1990	2,329	+1.13%
1999	2,316	−0.06%
2007	2,295	−0.11%
2012	2,557	+2.19%
2017	2,836	+2.09%
2023	3,406	+3.10%
Source: INSEE

== Personalities ==
- French footballer Charles Orlanducci, born in Vescovato in 1951.
- French industrialist and entrepreneur Michel Pierucci, born in Vescovato in 1966. Involved in the political stage, where he was Director of the Businenss Chamber of Northern Corsica, and the opposition to the mayor. He is a non-affiliated right-winged politician.
- Joachim Murat, former Maréchal of France and once King of Naples, briefly hid out in Vescovato in August 1815 after Napoleon's ultimate defeat at Waterloo, before marching on Ajaccio.
- Joachin Pierucci, former industrialist, turned philanthropist. He was part of the France national team of Pétanque{?}, from whom he received the Bronze Médaille des Sports and ran La Boule Dorée.

== See also ==
- Communes of the Haute-Corse department
