= Corse-Matin =

Daily local newspaper in France

- Type: Daily newspaper
- Owner: Nice-Matin Group
- Founded: 1944
- Language: French
- Headquarters: Ajaccio, Corsica
- Country: France
- Circulation: 25,906 (as of 2020)
- Website: www.corsematin.com

Corse-Matin (French pronunciation: [kɔʁs matɛ̃]) is a French-language daily local newspaper published in Ajaccio, Corsica, France.

== History and profile ==
Corse-Matin was part of Lagardère Group through its subsidiary Groupe Hachette until August 2007 when it was sold to Hersant Media Group. The paper is owned by Nice-Matin Group. In December 2012 French businessman Bernard Tapie bought a share in the daily. The headquarters of the paper is in Ajaccio.

The sister newspapers of Corse-Matin are Nice-Matin, Monaco-Matin and Var-Matin. In 1998 another local daily of the island, La Corse, merged with Corse-Matin.

Corse-Matin has been subject to terrorist attacks. Its headquarters was attacked by unknown people in 1992, 1994 and 1997. In May 2011 the office of the paper in Bastia was also attacked.

In 2020 the circulation of Corse-Matin was 25,906 copies.

Year	Circulation
2005	46,677
2006	44,360
2007	43,728
2008	43,156
2009	42,312
2010	41,978
2011	41,274
2012	40,345
2013	38,536
2014	37,427
2015	33,663
2016	32,951
2017	32,792
2018	30,910
2019	28,733
2020	25,906
