= Prunelli-di-Fiumorbo =

Prunelli-di-Fiumorbo I Pruneddi di Fiumorbu (Corsican)
- Commune
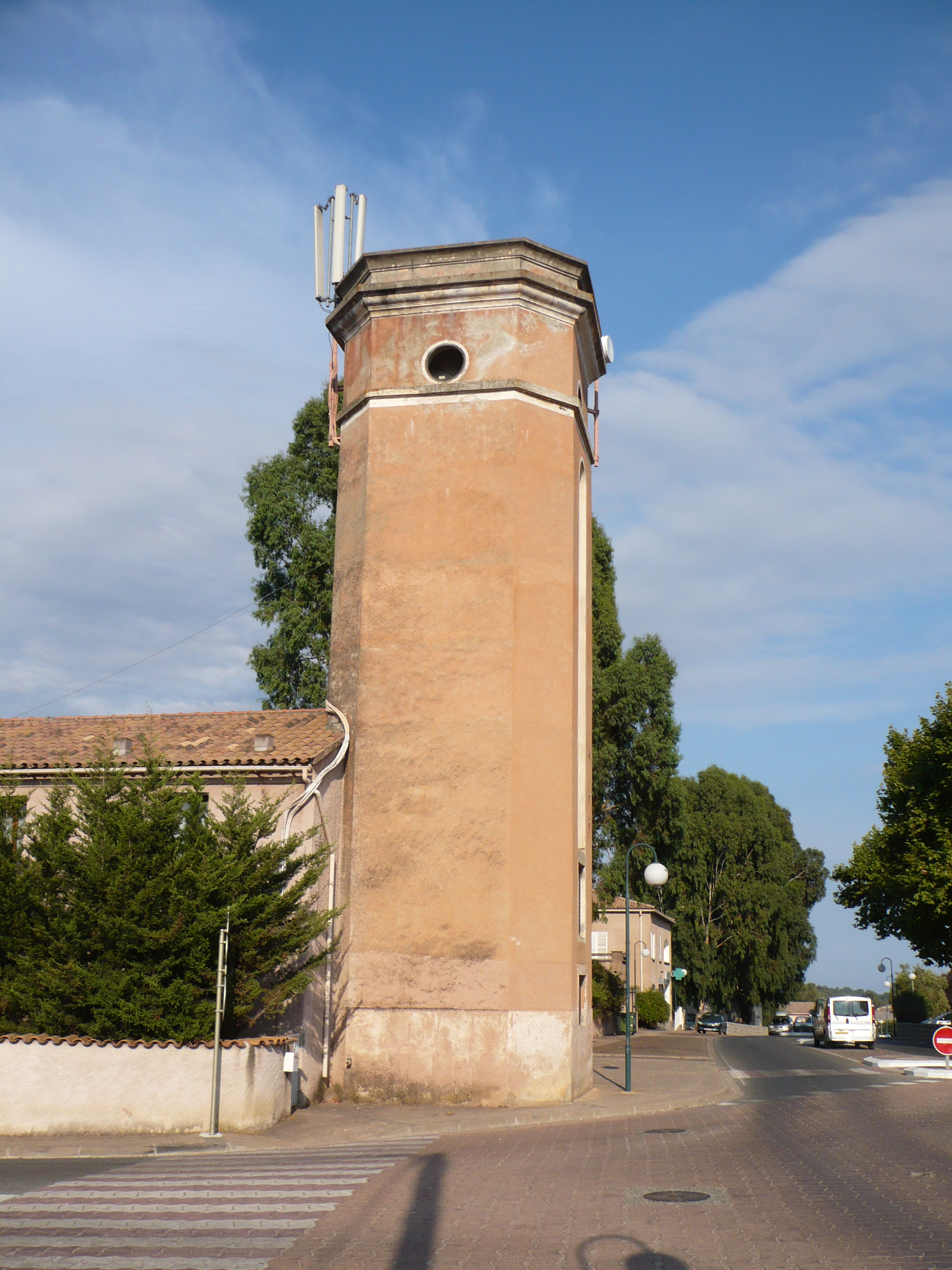
- The tower of the FORTEF (Forces et Terres du Fium'orbu) of Migliacciaru, housing a clock and a siren to inform workers of the time, in Prunelli-di-Fiumorbo

- Coat of arms
- Location of Prunelli-di-Fiumorbo
- Location within France Location within Corsica
- Coordinates: 42°00′41″N 9°19′31″E
- Country: France
- Region: Corsica
- Department: Haute-Corse
- Arrondissement: Corte
- Canton: Fiumorbo-Castello
- Intercommunality: Fium'Orbu Castellu

Government
  - Mayor (2020–2026): André Rocchi
- Area^{1}: 37.41 km^{2} (14.44 sq mi)
- Elevation: 580 m (1,900 ft)
- Highest elevation: 580 m (1,900 ft)
- Lowest elevation: 0 m (0 ft)
- Population (2023): 3,880
  - Density: 104/km^{2} (269/sq mi)
- Time zone: UTC+01:00 (CET)
  - Summer (DST): UTC+02:00 (CEST)
- INSEE/Postal code: 2B251 /20243
- ^{1} French Land Register data, which excludes lakes, ponds, glaciers > 1 km^{2} (0.386 sq mi or 247 acres) and river estuaries.

Prunelli-di-Fiumorbo (Italian: Prunelli di Fiumorbo; Corsican: I Pruneddi di Fiumorbu) is a commune in the Haute-Corse department of France on the island of Corsica.

== Population ==
Historical population

Year	Pop.	±% p.a.
1800	325	—
1806	475	+6.53%
1821	264	−3.84%
1831	480	+6.16%
1836	536	+2.23%
1841	600	+2.28%
1846	690	+2.83%
1851	867	+4.67%
1856	1,049	+3.88%
1861	918	−2.63%
1866	871	−1.05%
1872	740	−2.68%
1876	824	+2.72%
1881	965	+3.21%
1886	1,202	+4.49%
1891	1,120	−1.40%
1896	1,076	−0.80%
1901	1,197	+2.15%

Year	Pop.	±% p.a.
1906	1,194	−0.05%
1911	1,088	−1.84%
1921	1,021	−0.63%
1926	1,117	+1.81%
1931	1,160	+0.76%
1936	1,329	+2.76%
1946	1,107	−1.81%
1954	1,172	+0.72%
1962	1,186	+0.15%
1968	1,536	+4.40%
1975	1,608	+0.66%
1982	2,339	+5.50%
1990	2,647	+1.56%
1999	2,745	+0.40%
2007	3,119	+1.61%
2012	3,483	+2.23%
2017	3,660	+1.00%
2023	3,880	+0.98%

Source: EHESS and INSEE (1968-2023)

== See also ==
- Communes of the Haute-Corse department
