= Claude Érignac =

French politician (1937–1998)

- Born: Claude Jean Pierre Érignac; 15 December 1937; Mende, France
- Died: 6 February 1998 (aged 60); Ajaccio, Corsica, France
- Education: University of Paris; Sciences Po, ÉNA
- Occupation: Prefect
- Spouse: Dominique
- Children: 2

Claude Jean Pierre Érignac (French pronunciation: [klod ʒɑ̃ pjɛʁ eʁiɲak]; 15 December 1937 – 6 February 1998) was a French prefect on the island of Corsica.

Érignac was born in Mende, Lozère. In the course of his political career, he had been prefect of several departments and overseas departments since 1967. In 1996 he went to Ajaccio in Corsica to take office as the Prefect of Corse-du-Sud.

== Assassination ==
Claude Érignac was on his way to a classical music concert in Ajaccio when he was assassinated at 9:15 p.m. on 6 February 1998 by two gunmen, who shot him three times with a 9 mm Beretta pistol. The weapon had been stolen on 6 September 1997, when members of the National Liberation Front of Corsica stormed a gendarmerie barracks at Pietrosella. Corsican nationalist militant Yvan Colonna was suspected of the killing alongside seven other assailants belonging to the Cargèse-Sagone brigade, a former brigade of the National Liberation Front of Corsica which remained largely independent of the various feuding groups at the time. Colonna was arrested in 2003. He was found guilty for the third time in June 2011 for the murder and sentenced to life imprisonment.

== Legacy ==
Érignac's wife, children and some associates established the Claude-Érignac Association soon after his death. The bylaws of the association were published in the Journal officiel on 5 February 2000.

The French Ministry of the Interior at Place Beauvau in Paris, inaugurated a hall in his name in the ministry.

Political offices
Preceded by	Prefect of Meurthe-et-Moselle –	Succeeded by
Preceded by	Prefect of Yvelines –	Succeeded by
Preceded by	Prefect of Corse-du-Sud; Prefect of Corsica; 1996–1998	Succeeded by Bernard Bonnet
