= Sorbo-Ocagnano =

- Commune
- Location of Sorbo-Ocagnano
- Location within France Location within Corsica
- Coordinates: 42°28′34″N 9°27′27″E
- Country: France
- Region: Corsica
- Department: Haute-Corse
- Arrondissement: Corte
- Canton: Casinca-Fumalto

Government
  - Mayor (2020–2026): Dominique Albertini
- Area^{1}: 10.63 km^{2} (4.10 sq mi)
- Elevation: 310 m (1,020 ft)
- Highest elevation: 616 m (2,021 ft)
- Lowest elevation: 0 m (0 ft)
- Population (2023): 904
  - Density: 85.0/km^{2} (220/sq mi)
- Time zone: UTC+01:00 (CET)
  - Summer (DST): UTC+02:00 (CEST)
- INSEE/Postal code: 2B286 /20213
- ^{1} French Land Register data, which excludes lakes, ponds, glaciers > 1 km^{2} (0.386 sq mi or 247 acres) and river estuaries.

Sorbo-Ocagnano (French pronunciation: [sɔʁbo ɔkaɲano]; Corsican: Sorbu è Occagnanu) is a commune in the Haute-Corse department of France on the island of Corsica.

== Population ==
Historical population
Year	Pop.	±% p.a.
1968	546	—
1975	441	−3.00%
1982	440	−0.03%
1990	492	+1.41%
1999	716	+4.26%
2007	724	+0.14%
2012	789	+1.73%
2017	832	+1.07%
2023	904	+1.39%
Source: INSEE

== See also ==
- Communes of the Haute-Corse department
