= The Ecologists =

French green political party

The Ecologists – Europe Ecology The Greens Les Écologistes – Europe Écologie Les Verts
- Abbreviation: LÉ
- National Secretary: Marine Tondelier
- President of the Federal Council: Waleed Mouhali
- Spokespersons: Aminata Niakaté; Amine Kessaci (interim)
- Senate Leader: Mélanie Vogel
- European Parliament Leader: Terry Reintke; Nicolae Ștefănuță
- Founded: 13 November 2010; 15 years ago
- Merger of: The Greens; Europe Ecology
- Headquarters: 3 Rue de Vincennes; 93100 Montreuil
- Youth wing: Jeunes Écologistes
- Membership (2022): 11,106
- Ideology: Green politics Alter-globalization
- Political position: Centre-left to left-wing
- National affiliation: Ecologist Pole (since 2020); New Popular Front (since 2024); NUPES (2022–2024)
- European affiliation: European Green Party
- European Parliament group: Greens/EFA
- International affiliation: Global Greens
- Colours: Green
- National Assembly: 28 / 577
- Senate: 12 / 348
- European Parliament: 5 / 81
- Presidency of Regional Councils: 0 / 17
- Presidency of Departmental Councils: 0 / 101

Website
- lesecologistes.fr

The Ecologists – Europe Ecology The Greens (French: Les Écologistes – Europe Écologie Les Verts), commonly known as The Ecologists (French: Les Écologistes, LÉ) and formerly as Europe Ecology The Greens (French: Europe Écologie Les Verts [øʁɔp ekɔlɔʒi le vɛʁ], EELV [ə ɛl ve]) until 2023, is a centre-left to left-wing green political party in France. The party is a member of the European Green Party. It was formed on 13 November 2010 from the merger of The Greens and Europe Ecology.

== History ==
=== Party foundation ===
Following the 2008 municipal elections, The Greens sought to increase their political influence. Echoing these calls, Daniel Cohn-Bendit proposed the creation of open electoral lists for the 2009 European elections and the Greens' leadership allowed for the exploration of this possibility. Europe Ecology (EE), launched in the autumn of 2008, allowed The Greens to create a wider electoral alliance with environmentalists and social activists who had not been party members in the past. The new structure included, alongside longtime Green politicians, new activists or environmentalists such as Jean-Paul Besset (close to Nicolas Hulot), José Bové (alter-globalisation activist from the Confédération paysanne), Yannick Jadot (former head of Greenpeace France), Eva Joly (magistrate) and Michèle Rivasi (founder of CRIIRAD).

EE was successful in the 2009 European elections on 7 June 2009, reaching third place in France with 16.3% of the vote, only a few thousand votes behind the Socialist Party (PS), winning 14 of France's 72 seats in the European Parliament. The experience led to further attempts to expand the French green movement, ahead of the 2010 regional elections. Europe Ecology ran independent lists in the first round in every region, once again with the participation of new activists including Philippe Meirieu, Laurence Vichnievsky or Augustin Legrand. While they fell short of their 2009 success, EE nevertheless managed to win 12.5% of the vote nationally (third place).

The Greens and those new activists who joined the movement by way of EE – but who did not wish to join the party – began talks to allow for the creation of a new, enlarged political movement. In October and November 2010, EE and later The Greens ratified new statutes and a new manifesto. Notably, these new statutes allowed for "cooperators" - individuals who did not join the party as full paying members but who are nonetheless allowed to run as candidates, vote in presidential primaries and partake in debates over the platform.

The official launch of the new party, presented as a new political force, was held in Lyon on 9 November 2010. The new party adopted the name Europe Ecology – The Greens (Europe Écologie Les Verts, EELV). However, the launch of the party was marked by tensions between longtime politicians from the former Green party and new activists from various non-political social movements. Jean-Paul Besset, for example, resigned all his leadership responsibilities in EELV within weeks and denounced a "poisonous Cold War atmosphere". A month later, Philippe Meirieu was named as the first president of the party's new federal council, created by the EELV statutes.

In the 2011 cantonal elections, EELV won 8.2% of the vote nationally – becoming the third largest force on the left behind the PS and Left Front (FG). Although the traditional runoff deals were sealed with both of these parties, some EELV candidates qualified for the runoff against other left-wing candidates did not withdraw, creating tensions with EELV's traditional left-wing allies. Ultimately, EELV won 27 seats, 16 more seats than the Greens had won in the same series of cantons in 2004.

A presidential primary to nominate a candidate for the 2012 presidential election, open to members and cooperators, was held in June and July 2011. Four candidates sought the EELV nomination, most notably Eva Joly, an MEP and Nicolas Hulot, a well known TV personality and environmentalist. Joly emerged victorious in the runoff on 12 July with 58.16%.

In the 2011 senatorial elections, an agreement with the PS allowed for the first left senatorial majority under the Fifth Republic and the creation of the first entirely green parliamentary group.

On 15 November 2011, EELV and the PS signed a coalition agreement prior to the 2012 presidential election. The agreement included a commitment to reduce the share of nuclear energy in France from 75% to 50% by 2025, the progressive shutdown of 24 nuclear reactors, the creation of a carbon tax and raising taxes on very high incomes. The agreement also included an ad hoc electoral deal for the 2012 legislative elections in which the PS conceded over 60 constituencies to EELV, which would allow EELV to form a parliamentary group. On 8 May 2012, following the left's victory with François Hollande, EELV's federal council voted in favour of cabinet participation in the new left-wing government.

=== 2012–2015: presidential and legislative elections, partners of the government ===
In the 2012 presidential election, EELV candidate Eva Joly won 2.3% of the vote and was eliminated in the first round.

In the 2012 legislative elections, EELV candidates won 5.46% nationally and elected a record 17 deputies (in addition to one member of the regionalist Breton Democratic Union, backed by EELV). However, every EELV deputy who was victorious had benefited from the endorsement of the PS, although many faced local PS dissidents.

In the government of Jean-Marc Ayrault formed on 16 May 2012, EELV had two cabinet ministers: former party leader Cécile Duflot as minister of housing and territorial equality, and former MEP Pascal Canfin as junior minister for international development.

In the 2014 European elections on 25 May 2014, EELV received 8.95% of the vote, sixth place nationally, returning 6 MEPs.

=== Since 2017: opposition to Emmanuel Macron, European elections and municipal victories ===
In the 2019 European elections, EELV performed significantly above expectations, winning 13.5% of the vote and 13 out of 79 MEPs, placing third behind LREM and RN. This came despite EELV having not polled above 10% during the campaign.

Following the success of the 2019 European elections, the polls for the municipal elections predicted good results for EELV. Thus, cities like Rouen, Villeurbanne, Strasbourg, Besançon or Lille were considered as being able to be won. On the evening of the first round, around twenty environmentalist lists won the elections in the first round (including outgoing mayors such as in Schiltigheim), and EELV came out on top in several large cities (Besançon, Lyon, Strasbourg or Grenoble), or second but favorite in others (Bordeaux, Poitiers). The scores were however disappointing in several big cities like Paris, Nîmes, Montpellier or Marseille. In the latter, however, the EELV's list (8% in the first round) merged with the union list of the left which came in first (23%), moreover led by an environmental candidate from but suspended from the party, Michèle Rubirola.

The second round confirmed these good scores since the party won the municipalities of Lyon, Strasbourg and Bordeaux, the latter not having known alternation since 1945, but also Besançon, Tours, Poitiers and Grenoble. The candidates of Lille and Metz both suffered a narrow loss of 200 votes, respectively against and with the Socialist Party. The Rouen and Villeurbanne's lists joined those of the Socialist Party, both elected, like that of Marseille.

In October 2022, The New Democrats merged into EELV. In October 2023, EELV changed its name to The Ecologists.

== Ideology ==
As a green party, EELV prioritises and emphasises environmental issues. It calls for a 40% reduction in CO_{2} emissions, phasing out nuclear energy in favour of renewable energy, the creation of 600,000 green jobs, eco-friendly urban planning (the creation of green housing and the promotion of public transportation), the development of sustainable agriculture and a moratorium on the use of genetically modified organisms. EELV, like the Greens before it, has generally opposed large-scale development projects, most recently the Aéroport du Grand Ouest in Notre-Dame-des-Landes (Loire-Atlantique), although the PS and the incumbent government officially support the project.

On economic issues, EELV leans strongly to the left. Besides the creation of 'green jobs' in fields such as thermal isolation and renewable energies, it also supports a carbon tax and raising the progressive income tax levels for high earners (60% for incomes between €100,000 and €500,000, 70% for incomes over €500,000). EELV is close to some anticapitalist and many alter-globalisation activists. In its alternative budget in 2011, EELV proposed to reduce the public debt by closing fiscal loopholes.

The party has traditionally supported European federalism, although many of its European policies are in conflict with the current direction and leadership of the European Union. EELV, like the Greens before it, has been one of the strongest proponents of decentralisation, officially supporting "differentiated federalism" which would devolve significant powers to the regions of France. The regionalist federation Régions et Peuples Solidaires has long been closely allied to the green movement in France. François Alfonsi of the Party of the Corsican Nation (PNC) was elected to the European Parliament on an EE list in 2009.

The green movement supports political reform, including voting rights for foreigners in both local and national elections, abolishing the cumul des mandats, term limits and a 'Sixth Republic' with a more powers for the parliament and direct democracy. The greens have long promoted gender equality in politics, its leadership and electoral candidates tend to respect gender parity and the EELV group in the French National Assembly has two co-presidents, one male and one female.

== Electoral results ==
=== Presidential ===
Election year	Candidate	1st round			2nd round			Result
Election year	Candidate	Votes	%	Rank	Votes	%	Rank	Result
2012	Eva Joly	828,345	2.31	▲6th	—N/a			Lost
2017 (Note: Supported PS candidate.)	Benoît Hamon	2,291,288	6.36	▲5th	—N/a			Lost
2022	Yannick Jadot	1,627,853	4.63	▼6th	—N/a			Lost

=== Legislative ===
Election year	# of overall votes	% of overall vote	# of overall seats won	+/-
2012	1,418,264	5.46% (#5)	18 / 577	
2017	973,527	4.30% (#9)	1 / 577	▼17
2022	891,292	3.92% (#6)	27 / 577	▲26
2024	1,432,645	4.47% (#6)	26 / 577	▼1

- 18 (incl. Paul Molac of the UDB) were elected, but Cécile Duflot resigned her seat while minister in the government, the seat went to PS. She re-took her seat in May 2014. Isabelle Attard left EELV for New Deal in December 2013.

=== European Parliament ===
Election	Leader	Votes	%	Seats	+/−	EP Group
2009	Daniel Cohn-Bendit	2,803,759	16.28 (#3)	14 / 72	New	G/EFA
2014	Emmanuelle Cosse	1,695,914	8.95 (#5)	6 / 74	▼9	G/EFA
2019 (Note: Run in a joint list with R&PS and AEI, that won 13 seats in total.)	Yannick Jadot	3,055,023	13.48 (#3)	13 / 79	▲7	G/EFA
2024 (Note: Run in a joint list with AA, that won 5 seats in total.)	Marie Toussaint	1,348,049	5.47 (#6)	5 / 81	▼8	G/EFA

=== Other elections ===
- 2010 regional elections: EE lists won 12.2% nationally in the first round. It won its best result (17.82%) in Rhône-Alpes. All its lists withdrew and merged with PS lists, except in Brittany, where it maintained its own separate list and won 17.4% of the votes in the runoff.
- 2011 cantonal elections: EELV won 8.22% nationally and 27 seats.
- 2020 municipal elections: EELV won, as senior member of coalitions (mostly with left parties such as PS or LFI), some of the largest French cities, including Marseille, Lyon, Strasbourg, Bordeaux, Nancy and Besançon, while keeping the city of Grenoble (mayor reelected in first round). EELV was close to victory in Lille and Toulouse. The press called it a "green wave", highlighting the importance of ecology in French politics.

== Elected officials ==
=== Member of the National Assembly ===
- Christine Arrighi (Haute-Garonne's 9th constituency)
- Julien Bayou (Paris's 5th constituency)
- Lisa Belluco (Vienne's 1st constituency)
- Cyrielle Chatelain (Isère's 2nd constituency)
- Charles Fournier (Indre-et-Loire's 1st constituency)
- Marie-Charlotte Garin (Rhône's 3rd constituency)
- Jérémie Iordanoff (Isère's 5th constituency)
- Julie Laernoes (Loire-Atlantique's 4th constituency)
- Francesca Pasquini (Hauts-de-Seine's 2nd constituency)
- Marie Pochon (Drôme's 3rd constituency)
- Jean-Claude Raux (Loire-Atlantique's 6th constituency)
- Sandra Regol (Bas-Rhin's 1st constituency)
- Sandrine Rousseau (Paris's 9th constituency)
- Éva Sas (Paris's 8th constituency)
- Sabrina Sebaihi (Hauts-de-Seine's 4th constituency)
- Nicholas Thierry (Gironde's 2nd constituency)

=== Member of the French Senate ===
- Esther Benbassa (Val-de-Marne)
- Ronan Dantec (Loire-Atlantique)
- Raymonde Poncet (Rhône)
- Thomas Dossus (Rhône)
- Jacques Fernique (Bas-Rhin)
- Monique de Marco (Gironde)
- Guy Benarroche (Bouches-du-Rhône)
- Daniel Salmon (Ille-et-Vilaine)
- Guillaume Gontard (Isère)

=== MEPs ===
- Benoît Biteau
- Damien Carême
- David Cormand
- Gwendoline Delbos-Corfield
- Karima Delli
- Yannick Jadot
- Michèle Rivasi
- Mounir Satouri
- Marie Toussaint

=== Other elected officials ===
EELV claims 34 departmental councillors, 65 regional councillors and 50 mayors. Cities with an EELV mayor include Marseille, Lyon, Bordeaux, Tours, Grenoble, Strasbourg and Poitiers.

== Leadership ==
The party executive is formed by the Executive Bureau. The national secretary is the leader of the executive bureau and is the party's most senior leader. The federal council is composed of 150 members (75 men and 75 women) and serves as the party's parliament, meeting on a monthly basis.

- National secretaries: Cécile Duflot (2010–2012), Pascal Durand (2012–2013), Emmanuelle Cosse (2013–2016), David Cormand (2016–2019), Julien Bayou (2019–2022), Marine Tondelier (2022–present)
- President of the federal council: Philippe Meirieu (2010–2013), Thierry Brochot (2013–2016), Nicolas Bonnet (2016–2019), Henri Arevalo (2019–present)

== See also ==
- Ecologist group (Senate)
