= Revol =

The word "Revol" is used in the following contexts:

- Revol (song), a 1994 single by the Manic Street Preachers
- Revol Wireless, an Ohio-based wireless provider
- Revol Porcelaine, a French porcelain manufacturer
- Revol (surname), people with Revol as their surname
- Revol Bunin, Soviet composer

== See also ==
- The Revols, Canadian band
