= François Dufour =

French politician

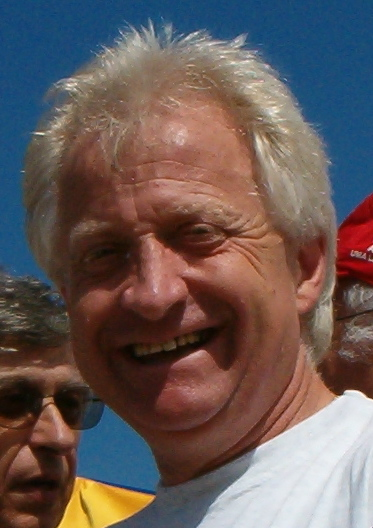
- Dufour in 2004

Member of the Regional council of Normandy
- Incumbent
- Assumed office 20 December 2017
- President: Hervé Morin
- Preceded by: Stéphane Travert

Personal details
- Born: 18 February 1953 (age 72) Saint-Senier-de-Beuvron, France
- Political party: Europe Ecology – The Greens

François Dufour (born 18 February 1953) is a French politician and a member of Europe Écologie–The Greens.

He is co-founder and vice president of ATTAC France and was member of the Confédération paysanne led by José Bové. He was the second candidate on the Europe Écologie list in the North-West constituency for the 2009 European election. He was not elected Member of the European Parliament.

In 2009, he was selected to be Europe Écologie–The Greens' candidate in Lower Normandy for the 2010 regional elections.
