= 2010 Île-de-France regional election =

French regional election

- March 2010
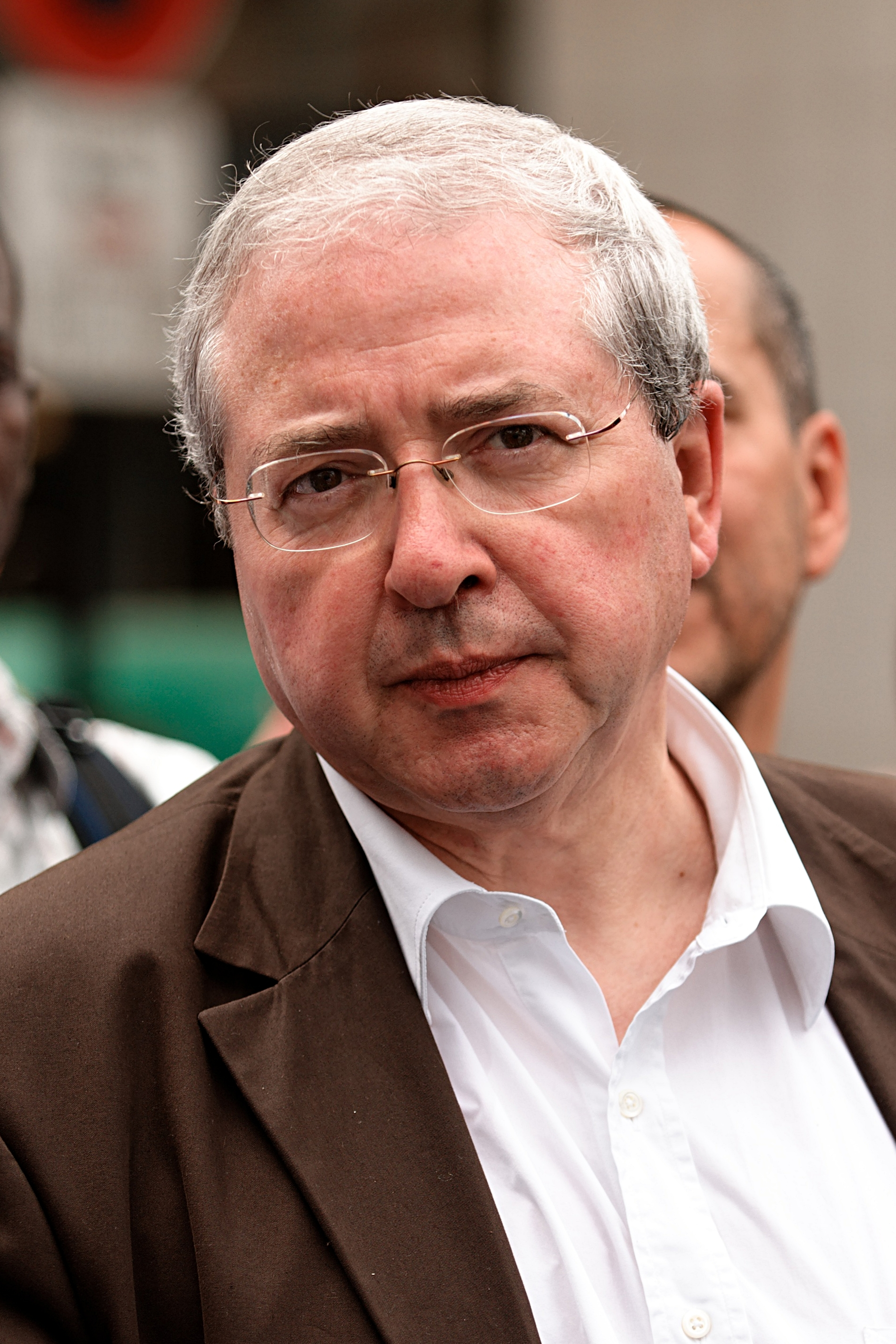

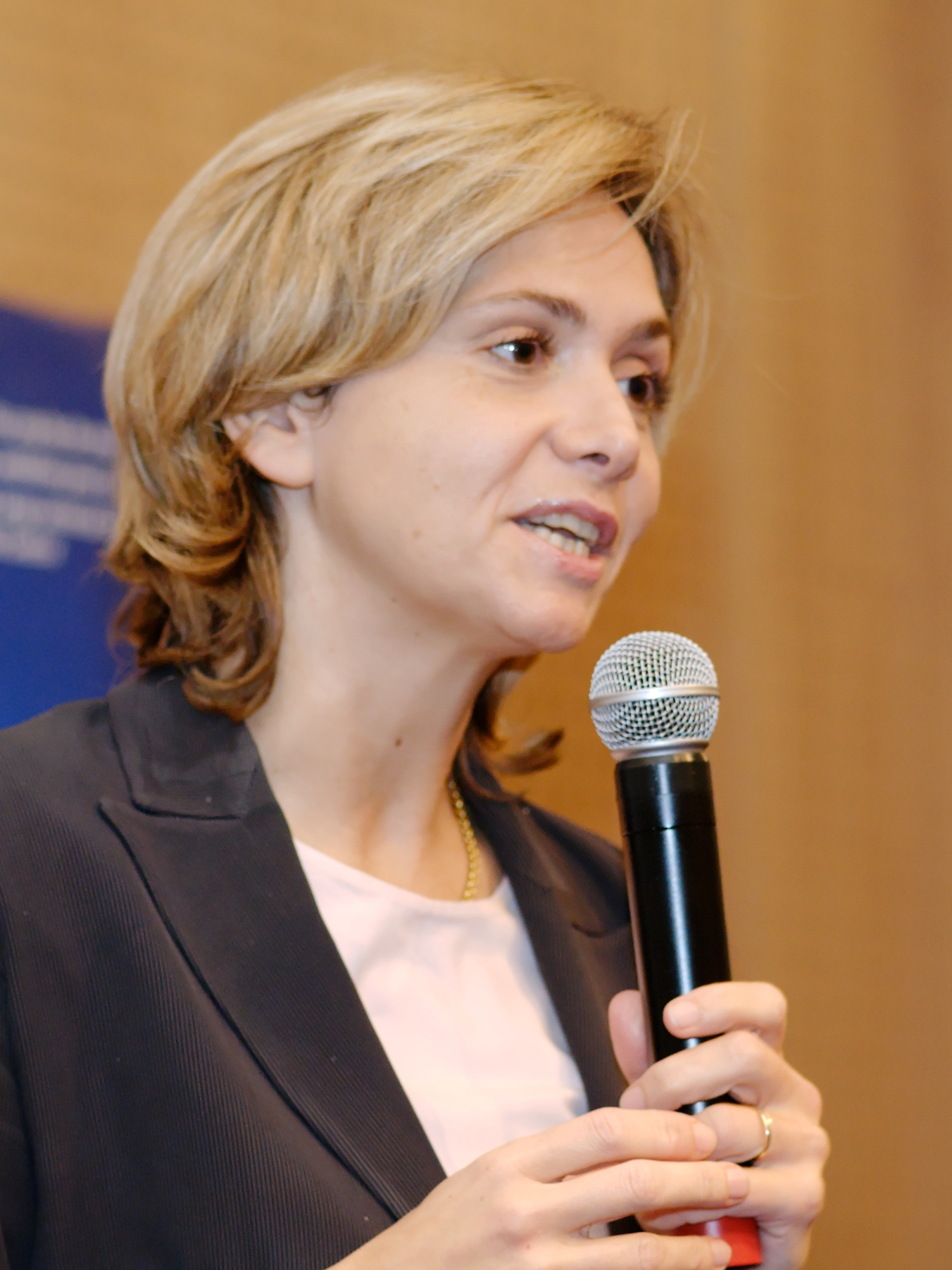
| Nominee | Jean-Paul Huchon | Valérie Pécresse |
| Party | PS | UMP |
| Popular vote | 1 720 644 | 1 314 580 |
| Percentage | 56.69% | 43.31% |
President before election
Jean-Paul Huchon
PS
Elected President
Jean-Paul Huchon
PS

The Île-de-France regional election, 2010 took place on March 14 and 21, 2010. Jean-Paul Huchon was elected a new time as President of the Île-de-France.

== Candidates ==
The following were candidates:

- PS : Jean-Paul Huchon
- Europe Écologie : Cécile Duflot
- FG : Pierre Laurent
- MoDem : Alain Dolium
- AEI : Jean-Marc Governatori
- Presidential Majority - UMP : Valérie Pécresse
- DLR : Nicolas Dupont-Aignan
- FN : Marie-Christine Arnautu
- NPA : Olivier Besancenot
- LO : Jean Pierre Mercier

=== Socialist Party Primary ===
Incumbent President Jean-Paul Huchon won the primary by a landside against outsider Kamal Mazouzi (88% to 12%).

=== Union for a Popular Movement Primary ===
Union for a Popular Movement primary for Île-de-France regional election, 2010
| Party | Candidate | Votes | % | ±% |
|---|---|---|---|---|
| UMP | Valérie Pécresse | 19,596 | 59,87% | |
| UMP | Roger Karoutchi | 13,134 | 40,13% | |

== Polls ==
=== Runoff polls ===
| Poll Source | Dates administered | Jean-Paul Huchon | Valerie Pecresse |
|---|---|---|---|
| Opinion Way | December 10, 2009 | 57% | 43% |
| Ifop | December 8–10, 2009 | 52% | 48% |
| Opinion Way | February 3–4, 2010 | 55% | 45% |
| CSA | February 10–11, 2010 | 57% | 43% |
| TNS Sofres | February 15–16, 2010 | 58% | 42% |
| Ifop | February 25–26, 2010 | 55% | 45% |

| Poll Source | Dates administered | Cécile Duflot | Valerie Pecresse |
|---|---|---|---|
| Opinion Way | December 10, 2009 | 57% | 43% |
| Ifop | December 8–10, 2009 | 52% | 48% |

== Results ==
Results of the Île-de-France regional election
| Chief candidate | List | First round | | Second round | | Seats | |
| Chief candidate | List | # | % | # | % | # | % |
|---|---|---|---|---|---|---|---|
| Valérie Pécresse | Presidential Majority | 802 123 | 27,76 | 1 314 580 | 43,31 | 67 | 32,06 |
| Jean-Paul Huchon* | PS, PRG, MRC | 729 898 | 25,26 | 1 720 644 | 56,69 | 142 | 67,94 |
| Cécile Duflot | Europe Écologie - Les Verts, Cap21 | 479 047 | 16,58 | 1 720 644 | 56,69 | 142 | 67,94 |
| Pierre Laurent | FG - Alternatifs - PCOF - DVG | 189 193 | 6,55 | 1 720 644 | 56,69 | 142 | 67,94 |
| Marie-Christine Arnautu | FN | 268 317 | 9,29 | | | | |
| Nicolas Dupont-Aignan | DLR - CNI | 119 844 | 4,15 | | | | |
| Alain Dolium | MoDem - GÉ | 114 983 | 3,98 | | | | |
| Olivier Besancenot | NPA | 90 319 | 3,13 | | | | |
| Jean-Marc Governatori | AEI | 40 405 | 1,40 | | | | |
| Axel de Boer | Christian list | 24 663 | 0,85 | | | | |
| Jean-Pierre Mercier | LO | 18 286 | 0,63 | | | | |
| Almamy Kanoute | Émergence | 12 242 | 0,42 | | | | |
| Inscrits | | 6 764 105 | 100,00 | 6 764 008 | 100,00 | | |
| Abstention | | 3 801 907 | 56,21 | 3 575 691 | 52,86 | | |
| Votants | | 2 962 198 | 43,79 | 3 188 317 | 47,14 | | |
| Blancs et nuls | | 72 878 | 2,46 | 153 093 | 4,80 | | |
| Exprimés | | 2 889 320 | 97,54 | 3 035 224 | 95,20 | | |

* list of the incumbent president

The previous majority (left wing), led by Jean-Paul Huchon, won this election, and Jean-Paul Huchon was thus elected President of the region one more time.
