= Revol (surname) =

Revol, Révol, or de Revol is a French surname. Notable people with this surname include:

- Anne-Marie Revol (born 1973), French writer
- Cédric Revol, French judoka
- Charles Revol-Tissot (1892–1971), French aviator
- Élisabeth Revol (born 1979), French mountaineer
- Fabien Revol (born 1978), French Catholic theologian
- Gastón Revol (born 1986), Argentine rugby player
- Guy-Charles Revol (1912–1991), French sculptor
- Louis de Revol (1531–1594), first French foreign minister
- Luis Revol (1858–1915), Argentine engineer and politician
- Max Révol (1894–1967), French actor
- Nathalie Revol (born 1967), French computer scientist
- René Revol (born 1947), French politician
