= 2004 Île-de-France regional election =

← 1998	21 March and 28 March 2004	2010 →

All 209 seats to the Île-de-France Regional Council
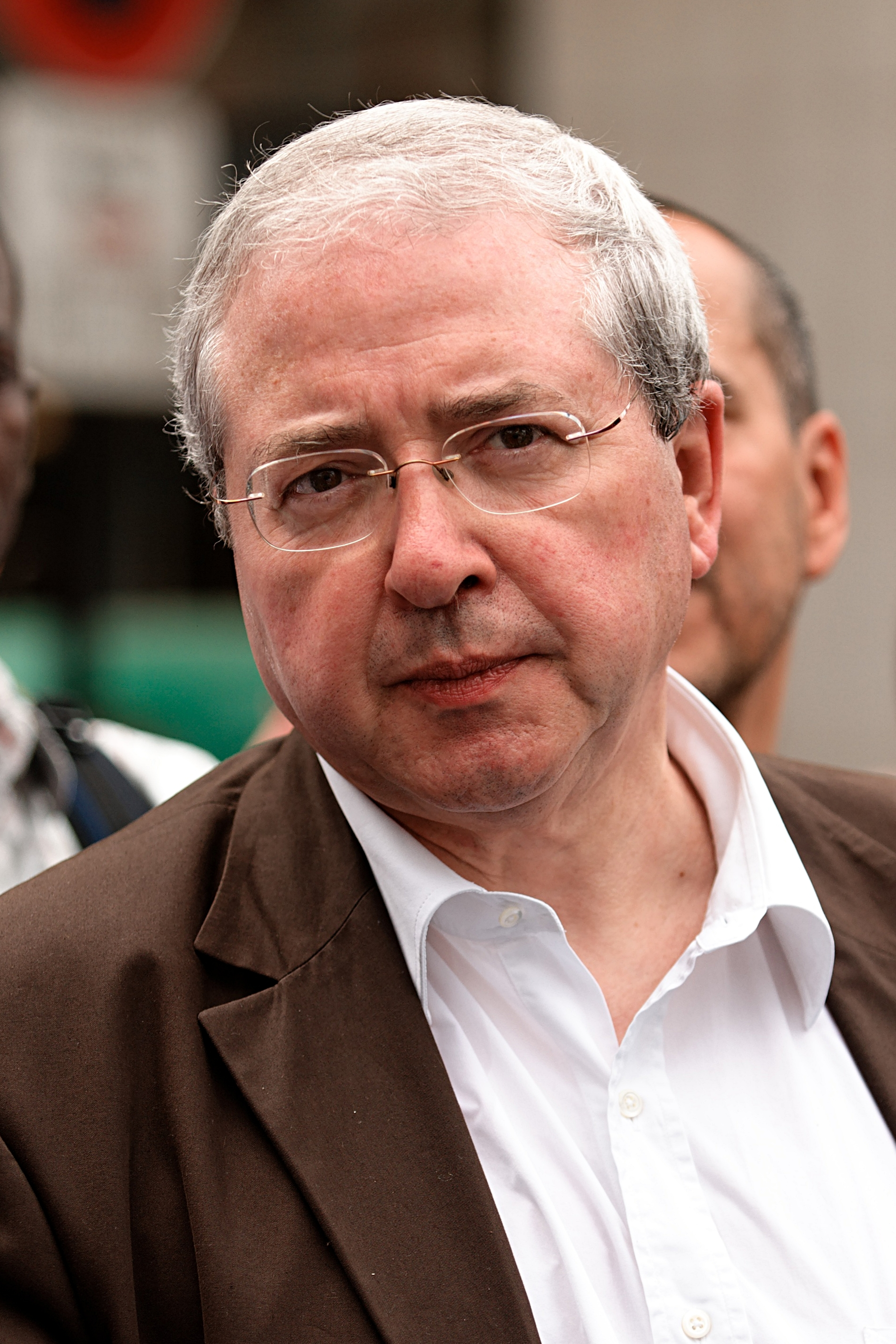

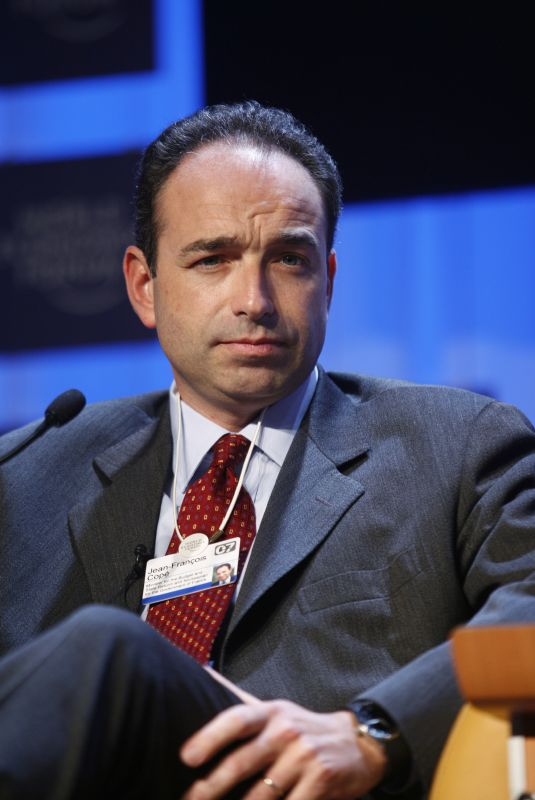

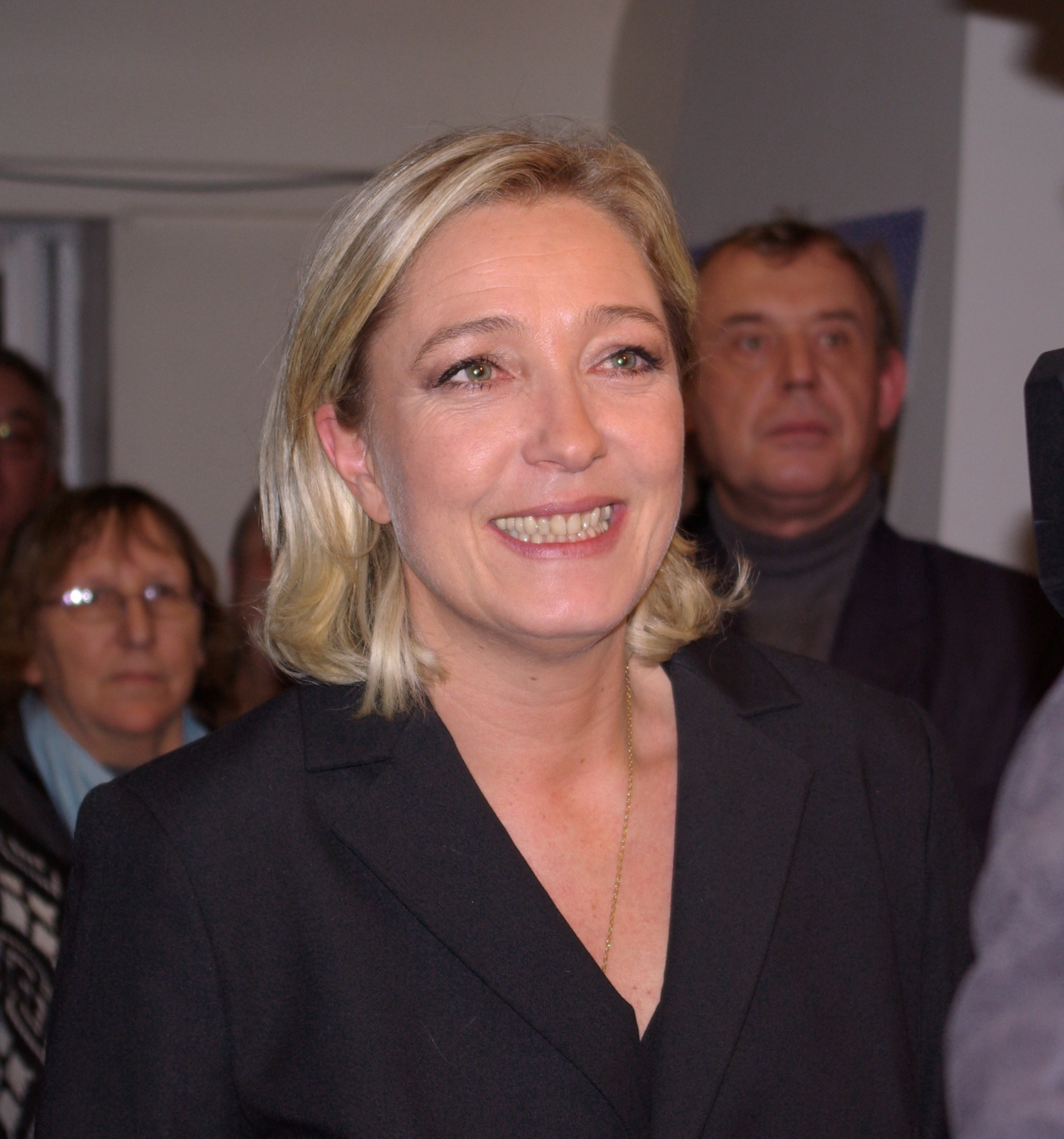
	First party	Second party	Third party
Leader	Jean-Paul Huchon	Jean-François Copé	Marine Le Pen
Party	PS	UMP	FN
Seats won	130	64	15
Popular vote	1 923 139	1 592 988	395 516
Percentage	49,17%	40,72%	10,11%
President before election
Jean-Paul Huchon
PS
Elected President
Jean-Paul Huchon
PS

A regional election took place in Île-de-France on March 21 and March 28, 2004, along with all other regions. Jean-Paul Huchon (PS) was re-elected President for a six years term.

== Election results ==
Île-de-France regional election, 2004
Party	Candidate	Votes	%	±%
PS	Jean-Paul Huchon	1 170 453	31.95	
UMP	Jean-François Copé	908 265	24.79	
UDF	André Santini	590 542	16.12	
FN	Marine Le Pen	448 983	12.26	
PCF	Marie-George Buffet	263 915	7.20	
LO	Arlette Laguiller	146 153	3.99	
GE	Carine Pelegrin	91 875	2.51	
MNR	Nicolas Bay	43 171	1.18	
Turnout		3 766 381	61.24	
Majority				
PS	Jean-Paul Huchon	1 923 139	49.17	
UMP	Jean-François Copé	1 592 988	40.72	
FN	Marine Le Pen	395 516	10.11	
Majority				
Turnout		4 016 317	65.30	
PS hold		Swing	8.45	
