= 2010 French regional elections =

- 14 and 21 March 2010

26 Regional Presidencies
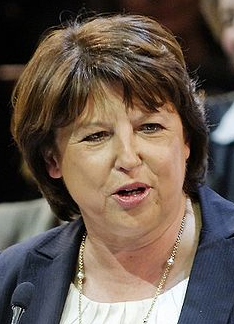

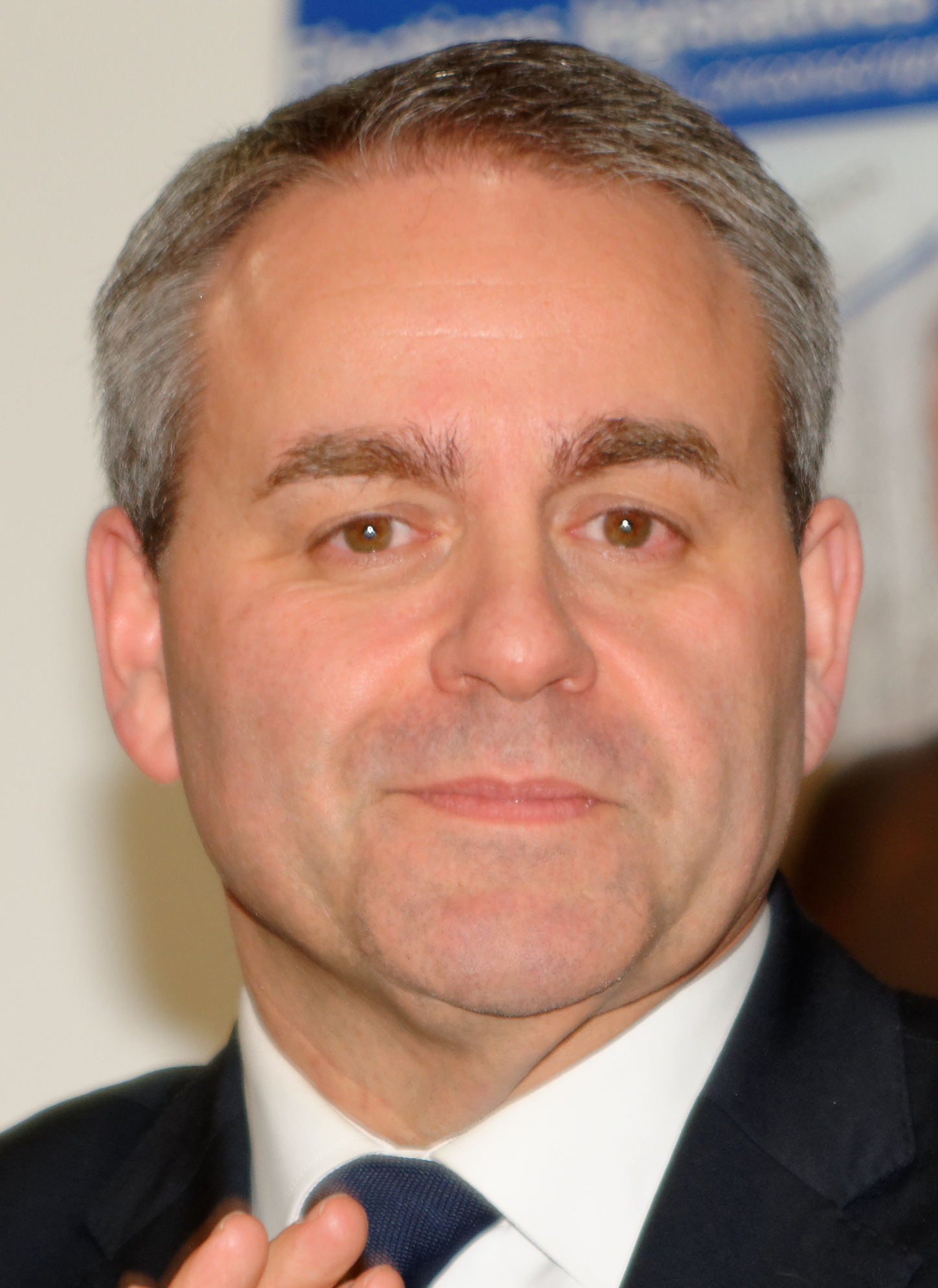

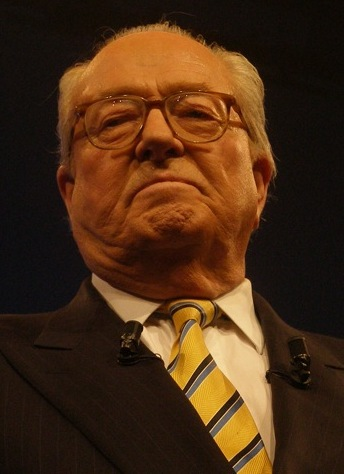
	First party	Second party	Third party
Leader	Martine Aubry	Xavier Bertrand	Jean-Marie Le Pen
Party	PS	UMP	FN
Regions won	23	3	0
Change	Steady	▲1	Steady
First round	5,673,912; 29.14% ▼7.72	5,066,942; 26.02% ▼7.71	2,223,800; 11.42% ▼3.28
Second round	10,493,988; 49.52% ▼0.39	7,496,897; 35.37% ▼1.47	1,943,307; 9.17% ▼3.26
- Second round results by region. Union for a Popular Movement Socialist Party Miscellaneous left

Regional elections were held in France on the 14th and 21st of March 2010. The Presidential seat for each of France's 26 régions were up for election, which have economic influence and control over the region despite a lack of legislative control.

The elections resulted in significant gains for the French Socialist Party (PS) and their allies, who went on to control 21 of the 22 regions of Metropolitan France.

== Situation ==
Following the 2004 elections, which saw a historic victory of the left led by the Socialist Party (PS), only the regions Alsace and Corsica were still run by the Union for a Popular Movement (UMP). The left gained voters on a national level in 2007 (presidential and legislative) and performed strongly in the 2008 municipal and cantonal elections. In metropolitan France, all incumbent left-wing Presidents ran for a second term in an election which generally favoured popular incumbents and anti-government voters. However, the left was divided between the PS and Europe Ecology, which performed very strongly in the 2009 European elections.

The right, principally the UMP and its allies, were victorious in the 2007 presidential and legislative elections and also in the 2009 European elections. The right was favoured by its unity, notably by its new alliances with Philippe de Villiers' Movement for France (MPF) and Frédéric Nihous' Hunting, Fishing, Nature, Tradition (CPNT). Yet, despite the newfound unity, the right lacked a large voter reserve in the eventuality of a second round, where it could only count on partial support from supporters of the centrist Democratic Movement (MoDem), and the far-right National Front (FN). In addition, the growing unpopularity of President Nicolas Sarkozy hurt the right in an election where voters tended to sanction the incumbent government in Paris.

On the far-right, the FN was weakened by its previous electoral failures since 2007, but nevertheless remained a significant force in French politics. Voter apathy was high, with 49% of voters abstaining, while others shifted their support to extreme parties on both the left and right.

== Main political parties and strategies ==
=== Left ===
The parties to the left of the PS were divided over their electoral strategy. On one side, the far-left and the New Anticapitalist Party (NPA) refused to participate in an executive led by the PS; but the French Communist Party (PCF) wished to continue its participation in a number of executives led by the PS.

The PCF finally decided to continue the Left Front with the Left Party (PG), first tested in the 2009 European elections. These lists would be independent in the first round, but would support (or merge) with a Socialist-led list in the runoff on the condition that the centrist MoDem did not do likewise. Yet, the final decision on the matter was transferred to the regional party members. In 17 of 22 regions, members approved the decision of an expanded Left Front; but in five regions, PCF members opted for a first-round alliance with the PS. These regions were Burgundy, Champagne-Ardenne, Lorraine, Lower Normandy and Brittany. In these regions, however, dissident Communists joined with the NPA and the PG to create independent lists for the first round.

The NPA's members voted on the party's strategy in December, and the independence strategy of the majority received support from only 36.3% of members, with 31.5% voting to continue discussions with the PCF-PG in the aim of obtaining a deal, and 28.5% rejected all talks with the FG. Finally, the NPA's executive opted to support independent lists of the "left of the left" in all regions in the first round and agreed to 'technical fusions' with other left-wing lists in the runoff (such as Left Front lists), without agreeing to participate in regional executives. In 11 regions, the NPA fought alone, notably against Left Front lists. However, in three regions – Languedoc-Roussillon, Limousin and Pays de la Loire, the NPA opted to support a Left Front list in the first round. Finally, in three of the five regions (except Brittany and Lorraine) where the PCF opted to support the PS in the first round, lists with the support of the PG were formed.

Contrarily to 2004, when it ran common lists with the LCR, the Workers' Struggle was running independent lists in all regions in 2010.

The Socialist Party was not able to renew the unity of the left behind it by the first round like in 2004. It received some support from dissident ecologists, as well as the support of the French Communist Party (PCF) in four regions (but not the support of the PCF's ally, the PG). It also had the support of the Left Radical Party in all regions except Brittany. In Poitou-Charentes, Ségolène Royal integrated five MoDem candidates on her lists.

All the party's incumbents, except for the controversial Georges Frêche (already expelled from the party in 2005), were re-nominated. The PS, with Hélène Mandroux, opposed Georges Frêche's list in Languedoc-Roussillon.

=== Ecologists ===
Strong from its excellent result in the European elections, the Europe Ecology coalition was renewed around the Greens and associated parties and movements. Europe Ecology ran independently in all regions, with the intention of supporting the left in runoffs. However, the party's ultimate goal would be to wrest control of a major region, such as Île-de-France from the PS. The coalition's candidates included the researcher Philippe Meirieu, magistrate Laurence Vichnievsky, the rural activist François Dufour or Augustin Legrand of the homeless' association les Enfants de Don Quichotte.

The Independent Ecological Alliance (AEI), after winning 3.6% in the European elections, was running independent lists in 10 regions. The AEI had signed electoral deals with Europe Ecology in Alsace and Midi-Pyrénées, and with the MoDem in Auvergne, Franche-Comté, Pays de la Loire and Poitou-Charentes.

Corinne Lepage's Cap21, despite being a component of the MoDem, the party ended up supporting Europe Ecology over the MoDem.

=== Centre ===
After the deceiving result of the European elections, François Bayrou's MoDem decided to run autonomous lists in all regions by the first round but chose to clarify its runoff strategy only after the first round. However, due to Bayrou's strong opposition to Nicolas Sarkozy, it was deemed unlikely that any MoDem lists would merge with UMP lists for the runoffs.

=== The Presidential Majority ===
Nicolas Sarkozy was successful in his attempts to push for the unity of all the Presidential Majority by the first round around the Union for a Popular Movement (UMP) and its allies, notably the New Centre and the Movement for France. Three cabinet ministers and five secretaries of states were leading regional lists, and eight other cabinet members were present on the majority's lists.

The New Centre obtained the top candidacy in Burgundy (with François Sauvadet) and Nord-Pas-de-Calais (with Valérie Létard), but not in Lower Normandy.

Despite the right's relative unity, there was a number of small dissidents lists in a number of regions.

=== Far-right ===
The National Front ran lists in all metropolitan regions. Jean-Marie Le Pen was a candidate in Provence-Alpes-Côte d'Azur and his daughter Marine Le Pen was a candidate in Nord-Pas-de-Calais.

In Provence-Alpes-Côte d'Azur, the ex-MPF and ex-FN mayor of Orange Jacques Bompard was leading a list named "Ligue du Sud", and there was a similar "Ligue du midi" in Languedoc-Roussillon.

Furthermore, around the Party of France or smaller dissident parties, there were a number of dissident far-right lists in some regions.

== Polling ==
=== Nationwide polling ===
Party	OpinionWay 01/10/09	CSA 01/10/09	OpinionWay 29 October 2009	OpinionWay 19 November 2009	Ifop 20 November 2009	OpinionWay 10/12/09	CSA 17 January 2010	Ifop 26 January 2010	TNS Sofres 04/02/10	OpinionWay 08/02/10	CSA 14 February 2010	Ifop 17 February 2010	OpinionWay 20 February 2010	Ifop 28 February 2010
Presidential Majority	36%	31%	33%	31%	30%	30%	33%	27%	30%	30%	33%	29.5%	32%	27.5%
PS	19%	21%	21%	22%	21%	23%	22%	27%	28%	27%	27%	29%	26%	31%
Europe Ecology	16%	17%	15%	16%	15%	14%	15%	13%	13%	10%	13%	11%	14%	13%
FN	6%	8%	9%	9%	8%	10%	7%	8.5%	8.5%	9%	8%	9%	9%	9.5%
MoDem	7%	8%	6%	7%	6%	8%	9%	6.5%	4%	6%	5%	5%	5%	4%
Left Front	8%	6%	6%	6%	7%	4%	6%	5%	6%	6%	4%	6.5%	5%	6.5%
NPA	5%	6%	5%	4%	4%	4%	5%	3%	3.5%	4%	3%	2.5%	2%	2%
LO	—	3%	—	—	2%	2%	3%	2%	3%	1%	2%	1%	1%	1.5%
Others	3%	—	5%	5%	7%	5%	—	8%	4%	7%	5%	5.5%	7%	5%

Party	CSA 01/03/10	TNS Sofres 04/03/10	OpinionWay 05/03/10	CSA 05/03/10
Presidential Majority	29%	30%	31%	27%
PS	30%	28%	27%	31%
Europe Ecology	15%	12%	13%	14%
FN	8%	8%	9%	9%
MoDem	5%	4%	5%	5%
Left Front	5%	7%	6%	6%
NPA	2%	1.5%	3%	2%
LO	2%	2.5%	1%	2%
Others	4%	7%	5%	4%

== National results ==
Among the 1880 seats, 41 were attributed at the first round (Guadeloupe) and 1839 at the second round.

=== First round ===
Regional election 2010: 14/03/10 – First round results (only main parties)
List	Candidates	Votes	%	±%	Seats	±
PS	Martine Aubry	5,673,912	29.14		31	
Presidential Majority	Xavier Bertrand	5,066,942	26.02		4	
EELV	Several parties	2,372,379	12.18			
FN	Jean-Marie Le Pen	2,223,800	11.42			
FG	Several parties	1,137,250	5.84			
MoDem	François Bayrou	817,560	4.20			
Other parties		???	11.20		6	
Total votes		???	100.00		41	

Abstention : 53.67%

=== Second round ===
Regional election 2010: 21/03/10 – Second round results
List	Candidates	Votes	%	±%	Seats	±
PS	Left union of PS, Europe Ecology, Left Front	9,834,486	46.40		1,006	-40
Presidential Majority	Xavier Bertrand	7,497,649	35.38		511	-11
FN	Jean-Marie Le Pen	1,943,307	9.17		118	-38
DVG	Different parties	698,556	3.30		92	+56
PS	Regions where Left union was refused	660,189	3.11		58	-22
EELV	Refusing Left union in Brittany	207,435	0.98		11	+11
MoDem	François Bayrou	178,858	0.84		10	+10
Other parties	Different regional parties	117,742	0.56		27	-13
FG	Refusing Left union in Limousin and Picardy	56,092	0.26		6	+6
Total votes		21,194,314	100.00		1839	

Abstention : 48.79%

== Regional results ==
The following tables show the results in the first round of voting which took place on 14 March 2010 and, where applicable, in the second round of voting which took place on 21 March 2010.

=== Alsace ===
Regional election 2010: Alsace
List	Candidates	Votes	%	±%	Seats	±
Presidential Majority	Philippe Richert	181,705	34.94	+0.88	28	+10
PS	Jacques Bigot	98,629	18.97	-1.15	8	±0
EELV	Jacques Fernique	81,116	15.60	+15.60	6	+2
FN	Patrick Binder	70,171	13.49	-5.09	5	-3
Alsace d'Abord	Jacques Cordonnier	25,906	4.98	-4.44	0	±0
MoDem	Yann Wehrling	23,072	4.44	+4.44	0	-7
FG	Jean-Yves Causer	9,695	1.86	-1.87	0	±0
NPA	Yvan Zimmermann	8,550	1.64	-1.39	0	±0
Écologie Solidaire	Manuel Santiago	8,376	1.61	+1.61	0	±0
DVD	Patrick Striby	8,303	1.60	+1.60	0	-2
LO	Julien Wostyn	4,486	0.86	+0.86	0	±0
Turnout		520,009	41.64			
Presidential Majority	Philippe Richert	284,576	46.16	+2.60	28	+1
PS	Jacques Bigot	242,113	39.27	+4.83	14	+2
FN	Patrick Binder	89,832	14.57	-7.43	5	-3
Turnout		616,521	49.37			

=== Aquitaine ===
Regional election 2010: Aquitaine
List	Candidates	Votes	%	±%	Seats	±
PS	Alain Rousset	406,869	37.63	-0.79	45	+1
Presidential Majority	Xavier Darcos	238,367	22.05	+3.65	17	+5
MoDem	Jean Lassalle	112,737	10.43	-5.63	10	+1
EELV	Monique De Marco	105,405	9.75	+9.75	10	+1
FN	Jacques Colombier	89,378	8.27	3.18	0	-7
FG	Gérard Boulanger	64,370	5.95	+1.60	3	+3
NPA	Philippe Poutou	27,264	2.52	-1.59	0	±0
AEI	Michel Chrétien	20,943	1.94	+1.94	0	±0
LO	Nelly Malaty	8,522	0.79	+0.79	0	±0
EAJ/PNV	Jean Tellechea	7,092	0.66	+0.66	0	±0
AB	Xavier-Philippe Larralde	250	0.02	+0.02	0	±0
Turnout		1,081,197	49.56			
PS	Alain Rousset	643,763	56.33	+1.46	58	+2
Presidential Majority	Xavier Darcos	320,137	28.01	-5.45	17	-4
MoDem	Jean Lassalle	178,858	15.65	+15.65	10	+10
Turnout		1,142,758	50.12			

=== Auvergne ===
Regional election 2010: Auvergne
List	Candidates	Votes	%	±%	Seats	±
Presidential Majority	Alain Marleix	137,199	28.72	-7.67	14	+2
PS	René Souchon	133,923	28.03	-0.19	17	-1
FG	André Chassaigne	68,050	14.24	+5.04	9	+2
EELV	Christian Bouchardy	51,092	10.69	+5.08	7	+2
FN	Éric Faurot	40,098	8.39	-1.19	0	±0
MoDem	Michel Fanget	21,523	4.51	+4.51	0	-3
NPA	Alain Laffont	20,031	4.19	-0.09	0	±0
LO	Marie Savre	5,832	1.22	+1.22	0	±0
Turnout		477,748	48.00			
PS	René Souchon	305,828	59.68	+7.01	33	+3
Presidential Majority	Alain Marleix	206,613	40.32	-7.01	14	-3
Turnout		512,441	51.55			

=== Brittany ===
Regional Election 2010: Brittany
List	Candidates	Votes	%	±%	Seats	±
PS	Jean-Yves Le Drian	408,554	37.19	-1.29	52	+6
Presidential Majority	Bernadette Malgorn	260,645	23.73	-1.87	20	-5
EELV	Guy Hascoët	134,112	12.21	+2.51	11	±0
FN	Jean-Paul Félix	67,870	6.18	-2.29	0	±0
MoDem	Bruno Joncour	58,841	5.36	+5.36	0	±0
PB	Christian Troadec	47,108	4.29	+4.29	0	±0
PG	Gérard Perron	38,559	3.51	+3.51	0	±0
Terres de Bretagne	Charles Laot	29,029	2.64	+2.64		
NPA	Laurence de Bouard	27,401	2.49	-2.29	0	±0
LO	Valérie Hamon	16,129	1.47	+1.47	0	±0
Solidarity and Progress	Alexandre Noury	10,306	0.94	+0.94		
Turnout		1,098,554	47.09			
PS	Jean-Yves Le Drian	600,256	50.27	-8.72	52	+6
Presidential Majority	Bernadette Malgorn	386,394	32.36	-8.85	20	-5
EELV	Guy Hascoët	207,435	17.37	+17.37	11	+11
Turnout		1,194,085	51.18			

=== Burgundy ===
Regional election 2010: Burgundy
List	Candidates	Votes	%	±%	Seats	±
PS	François Patriat	187,345	36.31	+0.30		
Presidential Majority	François Sauvadet	148,779	28.83	+7.05		
FN	Édouard Ferrand	62,147	12.04	-3.73	6	±0
EELV	Philippe Hervieu	50,757	9.84			
NPA	Sylvie Faye-Pastor	22,290	4.32			
MoDem	François Deseille	19,464	3.77	-9.21		
AEI	Julien Gonzalez	10,524	2.04			
LO	Claire Rocher	8,062	1.56			
MRC	Joël Mekhantar	6,641	1.29			
Turnout		516,009	44.27			
PS	François Patriat	305,226	52.65	+0.16	37	±0
Presidential Majority	François Sauvadet	194,370	33.53	+1.39	14	±0
FN	Édouard Ferrand	80,113	13.82	-1.55	6	±0
Turnout		579,709	49.71			

=== Centre ===
Regional election 2010: Centre
List	Candidates	Votes	%	±%	Seats	±
Presidential Majority	Hervé Novelli	227,408	29.02	+8.38		
PS	François Bonneau	221,199	28.22	-9.93		
EELV	Jean Delavergne	91,389	11.66	+11.66		
FN	Philippe Loiseau	87,864	11.21	-6.31		
FG	Marie-France Beaufils	59,050	7.53	+7.53		
MoDem	Marc Fesneau	39,818	5.08	-8.62		
Party of France	Jean Verdon	27,841	3.55	+3.55		
NPA	Michel Lasserre	20,341	2.60	-0.21		
LO	Farida Megdoud	8,839	1.13	-1.67		
Turnout		783,749	44.04	-17.57		
PS	François Bonneau	443,310	50.01	+0.86	49	+1
Presidential Majority	Hervé Novelli	323,178	36.46	+2.07	21	+1
FN	Philippe Loiseau	120,001	13.54	-2.92	7	-2
Turnout		886,489	49.82	-15.32		

=== Champagne-Ardenne ===
Regional election 2010: Champagne-Ardenne
List	Candidates	Votes	%	±%	Seats	±
Presidential Majority	Jean-Luc Warsmann	120,471	31.77	+5.11		
PS	Jean-Paul Bachy	117,596	31.01	+3.07		
FN	Bruno Subtil	60,261	15.89	-3.83		
EELV	Eric Loiselet	32,160	8.48	+0.97		
NPA	Anthony Smith	18,448	4.87	-0.13		
MoDem	Marie Grafteaux-Paillard	16,470	4.34	-6.77		
AEI	Ghislain Wysocinski	7,529	1.99	+1.99		
LO	Thomas Rose	6,244	1.65	+1.65		
Turnout		379,179	41.32	-17.40		
PS	Jean-Paul Bachy	190,162	44.31	+2.42	29	+1
Presidential Majority	Jean-Luc Warsmann	165,261	38.49	-1.34	14	-4
FN	Bruno Subtil	73,710	17.19	-1.09	6	±0
Turnout		429,133	46.75	-16.00		

=== Corsica ===
Territorial election 2010: Corsica
List	Candidates	Votes	%	±%	Seats	±
Presidential Majority	Camille de Rocca Serra	27,903	21.34	-6.75		
Party of the Corsican Nation	Gilles Simeoni	24,057	18.40	+6.26		
PRG	Paul Giacobbi	20,242	15.48	+5.00		
FG	Dominique Bucchini	13,108	10.02	+3.40		
CL	Jean-Guy Talamoni	12,236	9.36	+9.36		
PRG	Émile Zuccarelli	10,523	8.05	-4.91		
DVG	Simon Renucci	8,688	6.64	+0.84		
MoDem	Jean Toma	5,554	4.25	+2.72		
FN	Antoine Cardi	5,438	4.16	-0.31		
AEI	Jean-François Baccarelli	2,426	1.86	+1.86		
DVD	Jean-François Battini	599	0.46	+0.46		
Turnout		130,774	61.31	-11.17		
PRG	Paul Giacobbi	52,663	36.62		24	±0
Presidential Majority	Camille de Rocca Serra	39,765	27.65		12	-7
Party of the Corsican Nation	Gilles Simeoni	37,224	25.88		11	+3
CL	Jean-Guy Talamoni	14,159	9.85		4	+4
Turnout		143,811	67.42			

=== Franche-Comté ===
Regional election 2010: Franche-Comté
List	Candidates	Votes	%	±%	Seats	±
Presidential Majority	Alain Joyandet	128,225	32.13			
PS	Marie-Marguerite Dufay	119,159	29.86			
FN	Sophie Montel	52,440	13.14			
EELV	Alain Fousseret	37,333	9.36			
FG	Evelyne Ternant	16,171	4.05			
MoDem	Christophe Grudler	14,036	3.52			
NPA	Laurence Lyonnais	13,086	3.28			
Party of France	Christophe Devillers	9,820	2.46			
Écologie Solidaire	Claude Buchot	4,471	1.12			
LO	Michel Treppo	4,314	1.08			
Turnout		399,055	49.35			
PS	Marie-Marguerite Dufay	214,582	47.43		27	
Presidential Majority	Alain Joyandet	173,505	38.35		12	
FN	Sophie Montel	64,370	14.23		4	
Turnout		452,457	55.77			

=== Guadeloupe ===
Regional election 2010: Guadeloupe
List	Candidates	Votes	%	±%	Seats	±
PS	Victorin Lurel	78,261	56.51		31	
Presidential Majority	Blaise Aldo	19,405	14.01		4	
DVG	Éric Jalton	17,175	12.40		4	
Collectif Des Inkoruptibles	Cédric Cornet	9,634	6.96		2	
LO	Jean-Marie Nomertin	3,911	2.82			
GUSR	Jeanny Marc	3,903	2.82			
DVD	Octavie Losio	2,871	2.07			
Far left	Alain Plaisir	1,958	1.41			
DVG	Alain Lesueur	1,377	0.99			
Turnout		138,495	47.41			

=== Guiana ===
Regional election 2010: Guiana
List	Candidates	Votes	%	±%	Seats	±
Presidential Majority	Rodolphe Alexandre	12,201	40.61			
PRG	Christiane Taubira (Walwari)	6,916	23.02			
DVD	Joëlle Prévôt-Madère	2,225	7.41			
PSG	Gabriel Serville	1,845	6.14			
EELV	José Gaillou	1,582	5.27			
DVG	Chantal Berthelot	1,532	5.10			
Democratic Forces of Guiana	Gil Horth	1,443	4.80			
DVD	Roger Arel	1,274	4.24			
DVD	Gilbert Fossé	725	2.41			
PS	Léon Jean-Baptiste-Édouard	301	1.00			
Turnout		30,044	43.13			
Presidential Majority	Rodolphe Alexandre	19,152	56.11		21	
PRG	Christiane Taubira (Walwari)	14,982	43.89		10	
Turnout		34,134	49.00			

=== Île-de-France ===
Regional election 2010: Île-de-France
List	Candidates	Votes	%	±%	Seats	±
Presidential Majority	Valérie Pécresse	802,096	27.76			
PS	Jean-Paul Huchon	729,861	25.26			
EELV	Cécile Duflot	479,039	16.58			
FN	Marie-Christine Arnautu	268,313	9.29			
FG	Pierre Laurent	189,187	6.55			
DLR	Nicolas Dupont-Aignan	119,835	4.15			
MoDem	Alain Dolium	114,984	3.98			
NPA	Olivier Besancenot	90,322	3.13			
AEI	Jean-Marc Governatori	40,371	1.40			
DVD	Axel de Boer	24,686	0.85			
LO	Jean-Pierre Mercier	18,286	0.63			
DVG	Almamy Kanoute	12,242	0.42			
Turnout		2,889,222	42.71			
PS	Jean-Paul Huchon	1,720,644	56.69		142	
Presidential Majority	Valérie Pécresse	1,314,580	43.31		67	
Turnout		3,035,224	44.87			

=== La Réunion ===
Regional election 2010: La Réunion
List	Candidates	Votes	%	±%	Seats	±
PCR	Paul Vergès	71,602	30.23			
Presidential Majority	Didier Robert	62,581	26.42			
PS	Michel Vergoz	30,941	13.06			
DVD	Jean-Paul Virapoullé	15,952	6.73			
DVD	Nadia Ramassamy	14,014	5.92			
DVD	André Thien-Ah-Koon	12,734	5.38			
DVD	Eric Magamootoo	11,809	4.99			
EELV	Vincent Defaud	11,685	4.93			
Nasion Rénioné	Aniel Boyer	2,097	0.89			
LO	Jean-Yves Payet	1,944	0.82			
DVD	Johny Arnachellum	1,267	0.53			
DVD	Daniel Pouny	231	0.10			
Turnout		236,857	43.03			
Presidential Majority	Didier Robert	143,485	45.46		27	
PCR	Paul Vergès	112,201	35.55		12	
PS	Michel Vergoz	59,933	18.99		6	
Turnout		315,619	57.33			

=== Languedoc-Roussillon ===
Regional election 2010: Languedoc-Roussillon
List	Candidates	Votes	%	±%	Seats	±
DVG	Georges Frêche	304,810	34.28			
Presidential Majority	Raymond Couderc	174,519	19.63			
FN	France Jamet	112,646	12.67			
EELV	Jean-Louis Roumegas	81,119	9.12			
FG	René Revol	76,414	8.59			
PS	Hélène Mandroux	68,788	7.74			
AEI	Patrice Drevet	34,440	3.87			
CNIP	Christian Jeanjean	18,017	2.03			
Party of France	Jean-Claude Martinez	6,607	0.74			
LS	Richard Roudier	6,086	0.68			
LO	Liberto Plana	5,628	0.63			
Turnout		889,074	47.98			
DVG	Georges Frêche	493,180	54.19		44	
Presidential Majority	Raymond Couderc	240,556	26.43		13	
FN	France Jamet	176,380	19.38		10	
Turnout		910,116	49.11			

=== Limousin ===
Regional election 2010: Limousin
List	Candidates	Votes	%	±%	Seats	±
PS	Jean-Paul Denanot	106,152	38.06			
Presidential Majority	Raymond Archer	67,381	24.16			
FG	Christian Audouin	36,619	13.13			
EELV	Ghilaine Jeannot-Pagès	27,147	9.73			
FN	Nicole Daccord-Gauthier	21,638	7.76			
MoDem	Jean-Jacques Bélézy	9,925	3.56			
AEI	Jean-Louis Ranc	5,665	2.03			
LO	Elizabeth Faucon	4,366	1.57			
Turnout		278,893	50.92			
PS	Jean-Paul Denanot	140,826	47.95		27	
Presidential Majority	Raymond Archer	96,788	32.95		10	
FG	Christian Audouin	56,092	19.10		6	
Turnout		293,706	53.61			

=== Lorraine ===
Regional election 2010: Lorraine
List	Candidates	Votes	%	±%	Seats	±
PS	Jean-Pierre Masseret	227,060	34.36			
Presidential Majority	Laurent Hénart	157,080	23.77			
FN	Thierry Gourlot	98,286	14.87			
EELV	Daniel Béguin	60,516	9.16			
MoDem	Claude Bellei	20,905	3.16			
MNR	Annick Martin	19,850	3.00			
PG	Philippe Leclercq	19,809	3.00			
AEI	Jean-Claude Kaas	16,277	2.46			
DLR	Jean-Luc André	14,880	2.25			
NPA	Jean-Noël Bouet	14,819	2.24			
LO	Mario Rinaldi	8,537	1.29			
MPF	Victor Villa	2,346	0.35			
DVG	Patrice Lefeuvre	524	0.08			
Turnout		660,889	39.66			
PS	Jean-Pierre Masseret	375,660	50.01		46	
Presidential Majority	Laurent Hénart	237,019	31.55		17	
FN	Thierry Gourlot	138,549	18.44		10	
Turnout		751,228	45.11			

=== Lower Normandy ===
Regional election 2010: Lower Normandy
List	Candidates	Votes	%	±%	Seats	±
PS	Laurent Beauvais	157,007	32.55			
Presidential Majority	Jean-François Le Grand	133,558	27.69			
EELV	François Dufour	57,912	12.01			
MoDem	Rodolphe Thomas	42,942	8.90			
FN	Valérie Dupont	41,942	8.70			
NPA	Christine Coulon	24,046	4.99			
Party of France	Fernand Le Rachinel	17,898	3.71			
LO	Pierre Casevitz	6,982	1.45			
Turnout		482,287	45.19			
PS	Laurent Beauvais	296,192	57.15		32	
Presidential Majority	Jean-François Le Grand	222,053	42.85		15	
Turnout		518,245	48.58			

=== Martinique ===
Regional election 2010: Martinique
List	Candidates	Votes	%	±%	Seats	±
PPM	Serge Letchimy	51,796	40.05			
MIM	Alfred Marie-Jeanne	41,595	32.16			
Presidential Majority	André Lesueur	13,570	10.49			
RDM	Madeleine de Grandmaison	8,866	6.85			
BPM	Pierre Samot	5,131	3.97			
LO	Ghislaine Joachim-Arnaud	3,507	2.71			
DVG	Guy Lordinot	2,448	1.89			
MoDem	Max Orville	1,348	1.04			
DVD	Jean-Claude Granier	1,082	0.84			
Turnout		129,343	42.93			
PPM	Serge Letchimy	78,193	48.35		26	
MIM	Alfred Marie-Jeanne	66,359	41.03		12	
Presidential Majority	André Lesueur	17,187	10.63		3	
Turnout		161,739	53.69			

=== Midi-Pyrénées ===
Regional election 2010: Midi-Pyrénées
List	Candidates	Votes	%	±%	Seats	±
PS	Martin Malvy	415,096	40.93			
Presidential Majority	Brigitte Barèges	220,624	21.75			
EELV	Gérard Onesta	136,543	13.46			
FN	Frédéric Cabrolier	95,689	9.44			
FG	Christian Picquet	70,077	6.91			
MoDem	Arnaud Lafon	38,290	3.78			
NPA	Myriam Martin	29,319	2.89			
LO	Sandra Torremocha	8,548	0.84			
Turnout		1,014,186	49.76			
PS	Martin Malvy	705,449	67.77		69	
Presidential Majority	Brigitte Barèges	335,518	32.23		22	
Turnout		1,040,967	51.08			

=== Nord-Pas-de-Calais ===
Regional election 2010: Nord-Pas-de-Calais
List	Candidates	Votes	%	±%	Seats	±
PS	Daniel Percheron	358,185	29.16			
Presidential Majority	Valérie Létard	233,374	19.00			
FN	Marine Le Pen	224,870	18.31			
FG	Alain Bocquet	132,450	10.78			
EELV	Jean-François Caron	126,989	10.34			
MoDem	Olivier Henno	48,245	3.93			
CNIP	François Dubout	37,050	3.02			
NPA	Pascale Montel	36,869	3.00			
LO	Eric Pecqueur	17,700	1.44			
Young Farmers	Mickaël Poillion	12,649	1.03			
Turnout		1,228,381	42.80			
PS	Daniel Percheron	704,181	51.89		73	
Presidential Majority	Valérie Létard	351,502	25.91		22	
FN	Marine Le Pen	301,190	22.20		18	
Turnout		1,356,873	47.24			

=== Pays de la Loire ===
Regional election 2010: Pays de la Loire
List	Candidates	Votes	%	±%	Seats	±
PS	Jacques Auxiette	405,103	34.36			
Presidential Majority	Christophe Béchu	386,465	32.78			
EELV	Jean-Philippe Magnen	160,830	13.64			
FN	Brigitte Neveux	83,157	7.05			
FG	Marc Gicquel	58,897	5.00			
MoDem	Patricia Gallerneau	53,879	4.57			
LO	Eddy Le Beller	18,860	1.60			
PB	Jacky Flippot	11,669	0.99			
Turnout		1,178,860	46.20			
PS	Jacques Auxiette	702,163	56.39		63	
Presidential Majority	Christophe Béchu	543,069	43.61		30	
Turnout		1,245,232	48.79			

=== Picardy ===
Regional election 2010: Picardy
List	Candidates	Votes	%	±%	Seats	±
PS	Claude Gewerc	153,052	26.64			
Presidential Majority	Caroline Cayeux	149,012	25.94			
FN	Michel Guiniot	90,802	15.80			
EELV	Christophe Porquier	57,338	9.98			
PCF	Maxime Gremetz	35,655	6.21			
FG	Thierry Aury	30,719	5.35			
MoDem	France Mathieu	21,492	3.74			
NPA	Sylvain Desbureaux	17,267	3.01			
Party of France	Thomas Joly	11,625	2.02			
LO	Roland Szpirko	7,555	1.32			
Turnout		574,517	43.45			
PS	Claude Gewerc	310,674	48.28		35	
Presidential Majority	Caroline Cayeux	208,665	32.43		14	
FN	Michel Guiniot	124,177	19.30		8	
Turnout		643,516	48.72			

=== Poitou-Charentes ===
Regional election 2010: Poitou-Charentes
List	Candidates	Votes	%	±%	Seats	±
PS	Ségolène Royal	240,910	38.98			
Presidential Majority	Dominique Bussereau	182,044	29.46			
EELV	Françoise Coutant	73,650	11.92			
FN	Jean-Marc de Lacoste-Lareymondie	47,736	7.72			
FG	Gisèle Jean	28,803	4.66			
MoDem	Pascal Monier	26,985	4.37			
NPA	Myriam Rossignol	11,431	1.85			
LO	Ludovic Gaillard	6,451	1.04			
Turnout		618,010	48.11			
PS	Ségolène Royal	392,291	60.61		39	
Presidential Majority	Dominique Bussereau	254,957	39.39		16	
Turnout		647,248	50.39			

=== Provence-Alpes-Côte d'Azur ===
Regional election 2010: Provence-Alpes-Côte d'Azur
List	Candidates	Votes	%	±%	Seats	±
Presidential Majority	Thierry Mariani	388,352	26.60			
PS	Michel Vauzelle	376,595	25.80			
FN	Jean-Marie Le Pen	296,265	20.29			
EELV	Laurence Vichnievsky	159,431	10.92			
FG	Jean-Marc Coppola	89,255	6.11			
LS	Jacques Bompard	39,287	2.69			
MoDem	Catherine Levraud	36,701	2.51			
AEI	Patrice Miran	34,077	2.33			
NPA	Pierre Godard	30,810	2.11			
LO	Isabelle Bonnet	9,049	0.62			
Turnout		1,459,822	43.62			
PS	Michel Vauzelle	747,382	44.11		72	
Presidential Majority	Thierry Mariani	559,412	33.02		30	
FN	Jean-Marie Le Pen	387,374	22.87		21	
Turnout		1,694,168	50.62			

=== Rhône-Alpes ===
Regional election 2010: Rhône-Alpes
List	Candidates	Votes	%	±%	Seats	±
Presidential Majority	Françoise Grossetête	450,935	26.39			
PS	Jean-Jack Queyranne	433,987	25.40			
EELV	Philippe Meirieu	304,613	17.83			
FN	Bruno Gollnisch	239,330	14.01			
FG	Élisa Martin	107,768	6.31			
MoDem	Azouz Begag	73,937	4.33			
NPA	Myriam Combet	41,537	2.43			
DVD	Michel Dulac	32,476	1.90			
LO	Nathalie Arthaud	24,294	1.42			
Turnout		1,708,877	41.76			
PS	Jean-Jack Queyranne	994,381	50.75		100	
Presidential Majority	Françoise Grossetête	666,526	34.02		40	
FN	Bruno Gollnisch	298,273	15.22		17	
Turnout		1,959,180	47.85			

=== Upper Normandy ===
Regional election 2010: Upper Normandy
List	Candidates	Votes	%	±%	Seats	±
PS	Alain Le Vern	199,345	34.87			
Presidential Majority	Bruno Le Maire	142,927	25.00			
FN	Nicolas Bay	67,419	11.79			
EELV	Claude Taleb	52,164	9.12			
FG	Sébastien Jumel	47,961	8.39			
MoDem	Danielle Jeanne	16,460	2.88			
NPA	Christine Poupin	14,633	2.56			
DLR	Brigitte Briere	10,237	1.79			
Party of France	Carl Lang	8,363	1.46			
AEI	Bernard Frau	6,487	1.13			
LO	Gisèle Lapeyre	5,686	0.99			
Turnout		571,682	44.70			
PS	Alain Le Vern	346,633	55.10		37	
Presidential Majority	Bruno Le Maire	193,128	30.70		12	
FN	Nicolas Bay	89,333	14.20		6	
Turnout		629,094	49.19			

== See also ==
- Regional Council
