= Philippe Meirieu =

French researcher, writer and politician

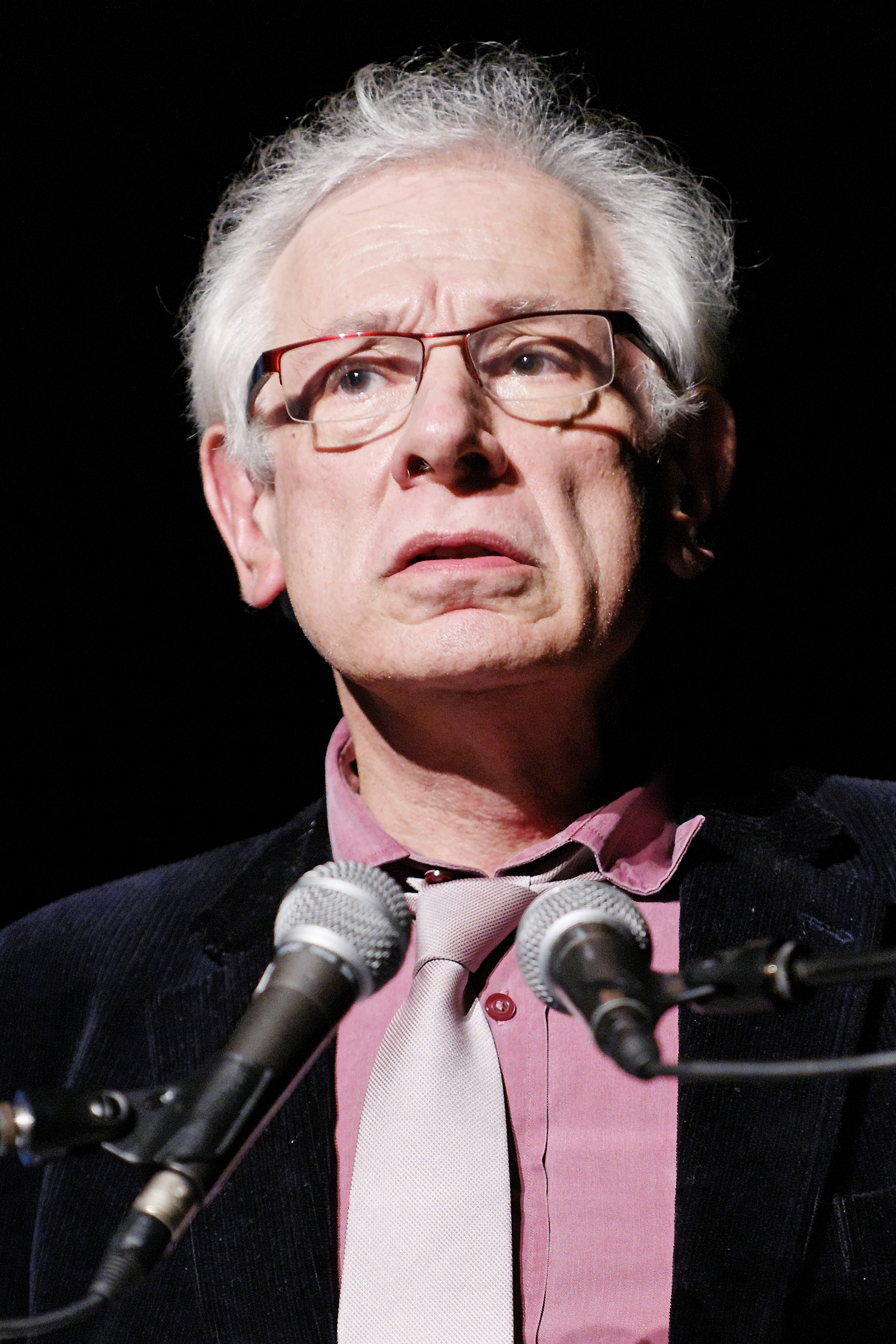
Philippe Meirieu at a Europe Écologie rally, February 2010

Philippe Meirieu (born 29 November 1949 in Alès, Gard) is a French researcher, writer and politician. He is a member of Europe Écologie–The Greens.

He is currently professor of education at Lumière University Lyon 2. He supported the Socialist Party for a number of years, before joining The Greens. He entered politics in 2009 when he was selected to be Europe Écologie–The Greens' candidate in the Rhône-Alpes for the 2010 regional elections.
