= Philippe Hervieu =

French politician

Philippe Hervieu is a French politician and a member of The Greens-Europe Écologie.

Hervieu is a regional Vice-President in Burgundy, a region of France. In 2009, he was selected to be the candidate of the Greens-Europe Écologie in Burgundy for the 2010 regional elections.
