= Daniel Béguin =

French politician

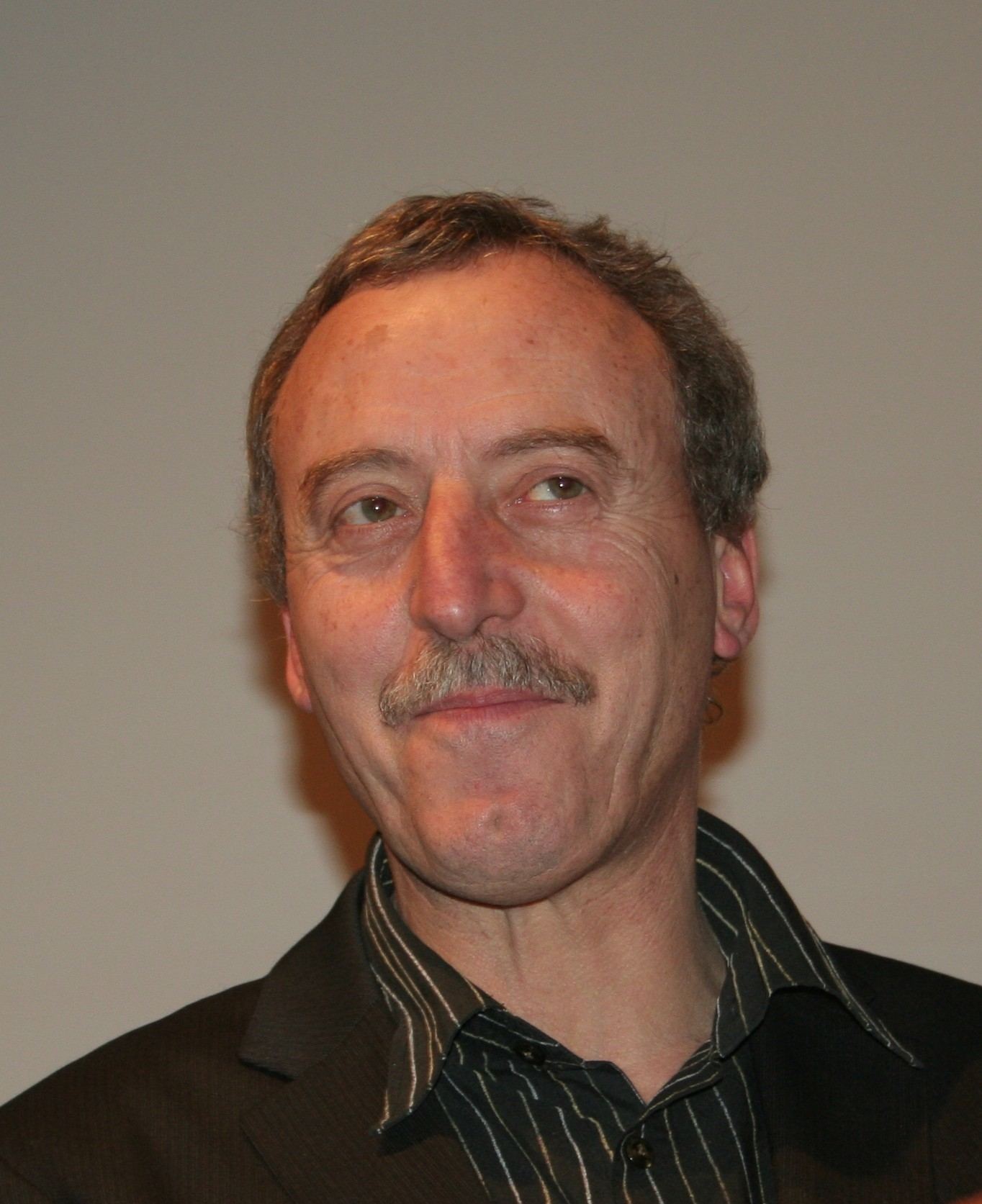
Daniel Béguin

Daniel Béguin is a French politician and a member of The Greens-Europe Écologie.

He is regional vice-president in Lorraine. In 2009, he was selected to be The Greens-Europe Écologie's candidate in Lorraine for the 2010 regional elections.
