= Gérard Boulanger =

French lawyer and human rights activist

Gérard Boulanger (October 1948 – 8 June 2018) was a French lawyer and human rights activist. He was close to the Left Front.

In 1999, Boulanger was convicted of defamation against the noted French historian Henri Amouroux.

A famous lawyer, notably leading charges against Maurice Papon, Boulanger was also a human rights activist and union member. He wrote the biography of Papon, Maurice Papon: A French Bureaucrat in Collaboration.

In 2010, he was selected to be the Left Front's candidate in Aquitaine for the 2010 regional elections. His list also received the support of the New Anticapitalist Party (NPA), despite negotiations between the NPA and Left Front failing nationally.

Boulanger died from cancer in June 2018.
