= Guy Hascoët =

French politician

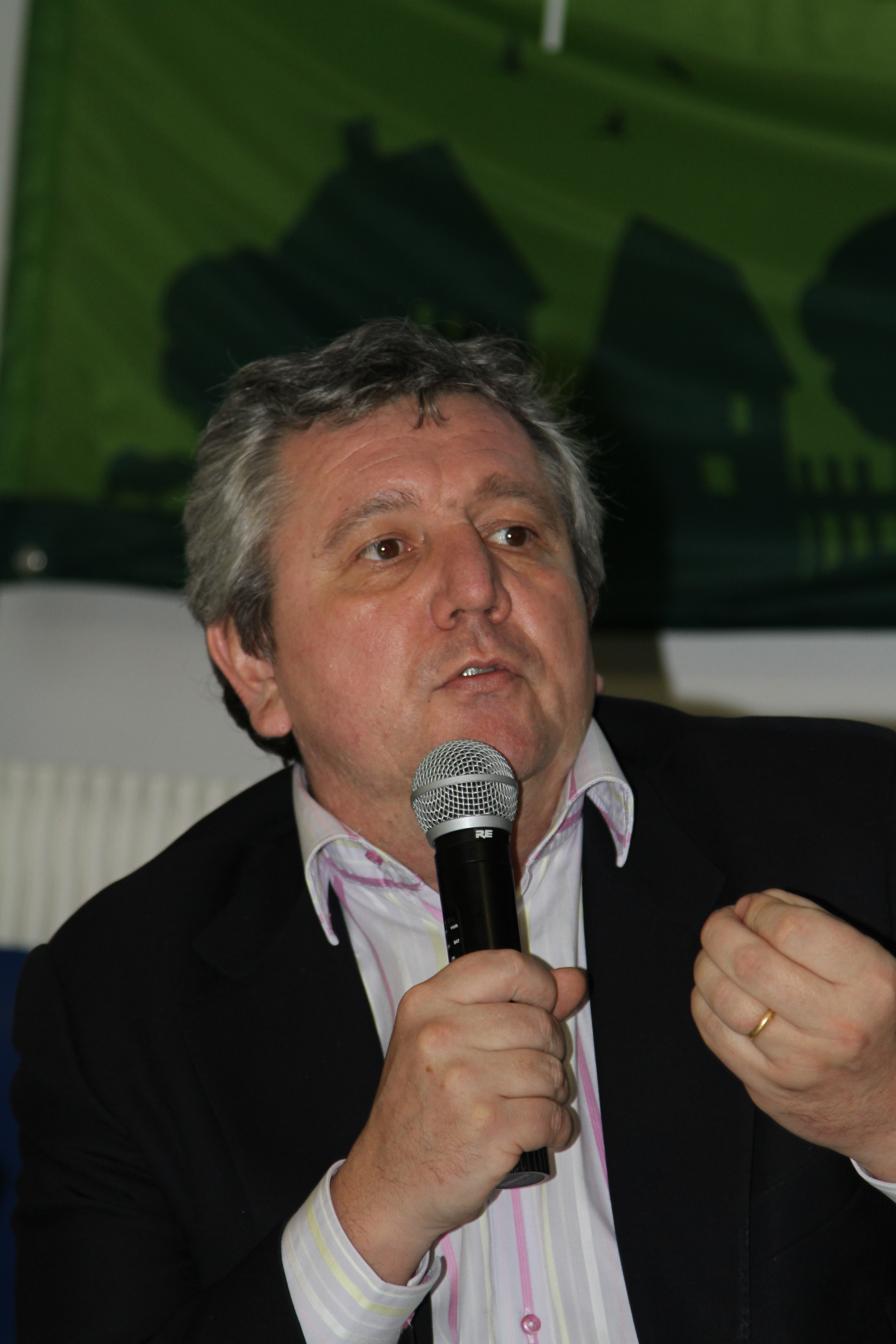
Guy Hascoët in Brest, January 2010

Guy Hascoët (born February 29, 1960, in Le Mans, Sarthe) is a French politician and a member of The Greens-Europe Écologie.

== Career ==
He was a major negotiator in the deal between the Greens and the PS which gave the Green Marie-Christine Blandin the presidency of the Nord-Pas-de-Calais region in 1992.

In the 1997 election, he became deputy for the Nord and became Secretary of State for the solidary economy in the Lionel Jospin cabinet in 2000. He later became a close ally of Lionel Jospin within the Greens, many of whom had grown uneasy with Jospin - notably Dominique Voynet.

In 2009, he was selected to be the leader of The Greens-Europe Écologie's list in Brittany for the 2010 regional elections. With 17,37% of the votes in the second term, he's elected in the regional council of Brittany

Em 2020, foi fundador e presidente da SCIC La coop des masques, bretonne et solidaire, que produz máscaras cirúrgicas e máscaras FFP2 Em setembro de 2021, demitiu-se do seu cargo. Em outubro de 2022, a empresa entrou em liquidação judicial.
