= Bernadette Malgorn =

French civil servant and politician

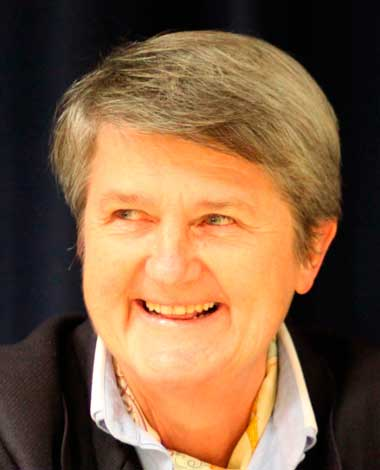
Bernadette Malgorn

Bernadette Malgorn (born 19 June 1951 in Nantes, Loire-Atlantique) is a French civil servant and politician. She is a member of the Union for a Popular Movement (UMP).

Born to military parents originally from Finistère, Bernadette Malgorn completed her university studies in history in the University of Rennes 2 - Upper Brittany and in economy in the University of Rennes 1. She subsequently joined the National School of Administration (ENA), from which she graduated in 1975.

She became a civil administration at the Ministry of Interior and later managed the office of the prefects of Saône-et-Loire, Val-de-Marne, and later Ille-et-Vilaine. In 1986, she joined the cabinet of the Minister of Social Affairs and Work, Philippe Séguin. She subsequently rejoined the public administration and became Prefect of the Tarn-et-Garonne in 1991 before resigning to join the parliamentary cabinet of Philippe Séguin.

On 26 September 1996 she became Prefect of Lorraine and Moselle, and on 25 June 2002 she became Prefect of Brittany and Ille-et-Vilaine. She occupied this function until 20 July 2006.

Since March 2009, she is advisor for the Court of Audit of France.

She is a candidate for the UMP candidacy in Brittany for the 2010 regional elections, against Jacques Le Guen.
