= Europe Ecology =

Former green electoral coalition in France

Europe Ecology Europe Écologie
- Leader: Daniel Cohn-Bendit
- Founded: 20 October 2008
- Dissolved: 13 November 2010
- Merged into: Europe Ecology – The Greens
- Ideology: Green politics Regionalism; Alter-globalization
- Political position: Centre-left to left-wing
- European affiliation: European Green Party
- European Parliament group: The Greens–European Free Alliance
- International affiliation: Global Greens
- Colours: Green

Europe Ecology (French: Europe Écologie) was a green electoral coalition of political parties in France created for the 2009 European elections composed of The Greens and other ecologists and regionalists.

The coalition was launched on 20 October 2008 with the support of the European Green Party and Daniel Cohn-Bendit, a Franco-German MEP previously representing the Alliance '90/The Greens of Germany, but who ran in France in 2009. Since its creation, the coalition received the support of Cécile Duflot, José Bové and Dominique Voynet amongst others.

After winning a record 16.28% of the vote in the 2009 European elections, the coalition maintained itself to participate in the 2010 regional elections.

In November 2010, the alliance was transformed into a political party under the name Europe Ecology – The Greens (EELV).

== Composition ==
Europe Écologie was made up of the following parties and personalities:

- The Greens: Cécile Duflot, Dominique Voynet, Daniel Cohn-Bendit, Gérard Onesta etc.
- Federation of Regions and Peoples with Solidarity: Regionalist parties including the Party of the Corsican Nation, Breton Democratic Union and Occitan Party
- Civil society: Eva Joly, Laurence Vichnievsky, Philippe Meirieu
- Former members of the French Communist Party: Stéphane Gatignon
- Alter-globalization activists: José Bové, François Dufour

== European Elections 2009 ==
=== Top Candidates ===
- East: Sandrine Bélier
- Île-de-France: Daniel Cohn-Bendit (The Greens)
- Massif Central: Jean-Paul Besset
- North-West: Hélène Flautre (The Greens)
- Overseas: Harry Durimel (The Greens)
- South-East: Michèle Rivasi (The Greens)
- South-West: José Bové
- West: Yannick Jadot

=== Results ===
Europe Écologie received 16.28% of the vote nationally, or 2,803,759 votes. It placed only 0.2% behind the Socialist Party (PS) nationally, and ahead of the PS in key regions such as Île-de-France, Provence-Alpes-Côte d'Azur and Rhône-Alpes. This is the highest result won by any green movement, party or coalition in any national French election.

- East: 14.27% (Sandrine Bélier)
- Île-de-France: 20.86% (Daniel Cohn-Bendit, Eva Joly, Pascal Canfin and Karima Delli)
- Massif Central: 13.58% (Jean-Paul Besset)
- North-West: 12.10% (Hélène Flautre)
- Overseas: 16.25% (no MEPs)
- South-East: 18.27% (Michèle Rivasi, François Alfonsi and Malika Benarab-Attou)
- South-West: 15.83% (José Bové and Catherine Grèze)
- West: 16.65% (Yannick Jadot and Nicole Kiil-Nielsen)

In addition, the smaller green Independent Ecological Alliance won 3.63% of the votes nationally.

== 2010 Regional elections ==
Strong from its excellent result in the European elections, the Europe Écologie coalition was renewed around The Greens and associated parties and movements. Europe Écologie decided to run independently in all regions, with the intention of supporting the Left in runoffs. However, the party's ultimate goal was said to be to wrest control of a major region, such as Ile-de-France from the PS. The coalition's candidates included the researcher Philippe Meirieu, magistrate Laurence Vichnievsky, the rural activist François Dufour or Augustin Legrand of the homeless' association Les Enfants de Don Quichotte.

=== Top Candidates ===
- Alsace: Jacques Fernique
- Aquitaine: Monique De Marco
- Auvergne: Christian Bouchardy
- Burgundy: Philippe Hervieu
- Brittany: Guy Hascoët
- Centre: Jean Delavergne
- Corsica: No Candidate
- Franche-Comté: Alain Fousseret
- Guadeloupe: No Candidate
- Guyana: José Gaillou
- Île-de-France: Cécile Duflot
- Languedoc-Roussillon: Jean-Louis Roumegas
- Limousin: Ghilaine Jeannot-Pagès
- Lorraine: Daniel Béguin
- Martinique: No Candidate
- Midi-Pyrénées: Gérard Onesta
- Nord-Pas-de-Calais: Jean-François Caron
- Lower Normandy: François Dufour
- Upper Normandy: Claude Taleb
- Pays de la Loire: Jean-Philippe Magnen
- Picardy: Christophe Porquier
- Poitou-Charentes: Françoise Coutant
- Provence-Alpes-Côte d'Azur: Laurence Vichnievsky
- Réunion: Vincent Defaud
- Rhône-Alpes: Philippe Meirieu

=== Results ===
Europe Écologie received 12.19% of the national vote, or 2,373,922 votes, in the first round. The party came third overall behind the Socialist Party and conservative Union for a Popular Movement. It recorded good results in Rhônes-Alpes (17.82%), Île-de-France (16.58%) and Alsace (15.60%). In the second ballot, Europe Écologie entered joint lists with the Socialist Party, except in Brittany.
