= Henri Amouroux =

French historian and journalist (1920– 2007)

Henri Amouroux (1 July 1920 in Périgueux, Dordogne – 5 August 2007 in Le Mesnil-Mauger) was a French historian and journalist.

== Life and career ==
Amouroux was born in the French city of Périgueux on 1 July 1920. After studying at the ECJ, he began his career as a journalist during World War II and joined a French Resistance group based in Bordeaux (group Jade-Amicol). He was awarded Croix de Guerre 1939–1945.

Amouroux wrote several books on the German occupation of France during his life, especially a ten-volume La Grande Histoire des Français sous l'Occupation (The Full History of the French under the Occupation), published from 1976 to 1993. He later worked for several French newspaper (France Soir) radio (France Inter) and television (TF1) stations. Amouroux was called to testify on behalf of Maurice Papon in 1997, who was on trial in France for his role in the deportation of Jews during the German occupation of France and Vichy collaboration. His testimony was used to counter American historian Robert O. Paxton's version of the Vichy France period during World War II. His testimony was criticized mostly by lawyers representing Jewish Holocaust victims who accused Amouroux of being an apologist for Papon and Vichy France's collaboration with the Nazis. Amouroux denied all charges and MRAP's lawyer, Gérard Boulanger, was convicted for defamation in 1997.

Amouroux was a member of the Institut de France and served as president of the Académie des Sciences Morales et Politiques. He died in 2007 in Normandy at the age of 87, and was buried in the Gironde region of France.
