= Jacques Fernique =

French politician

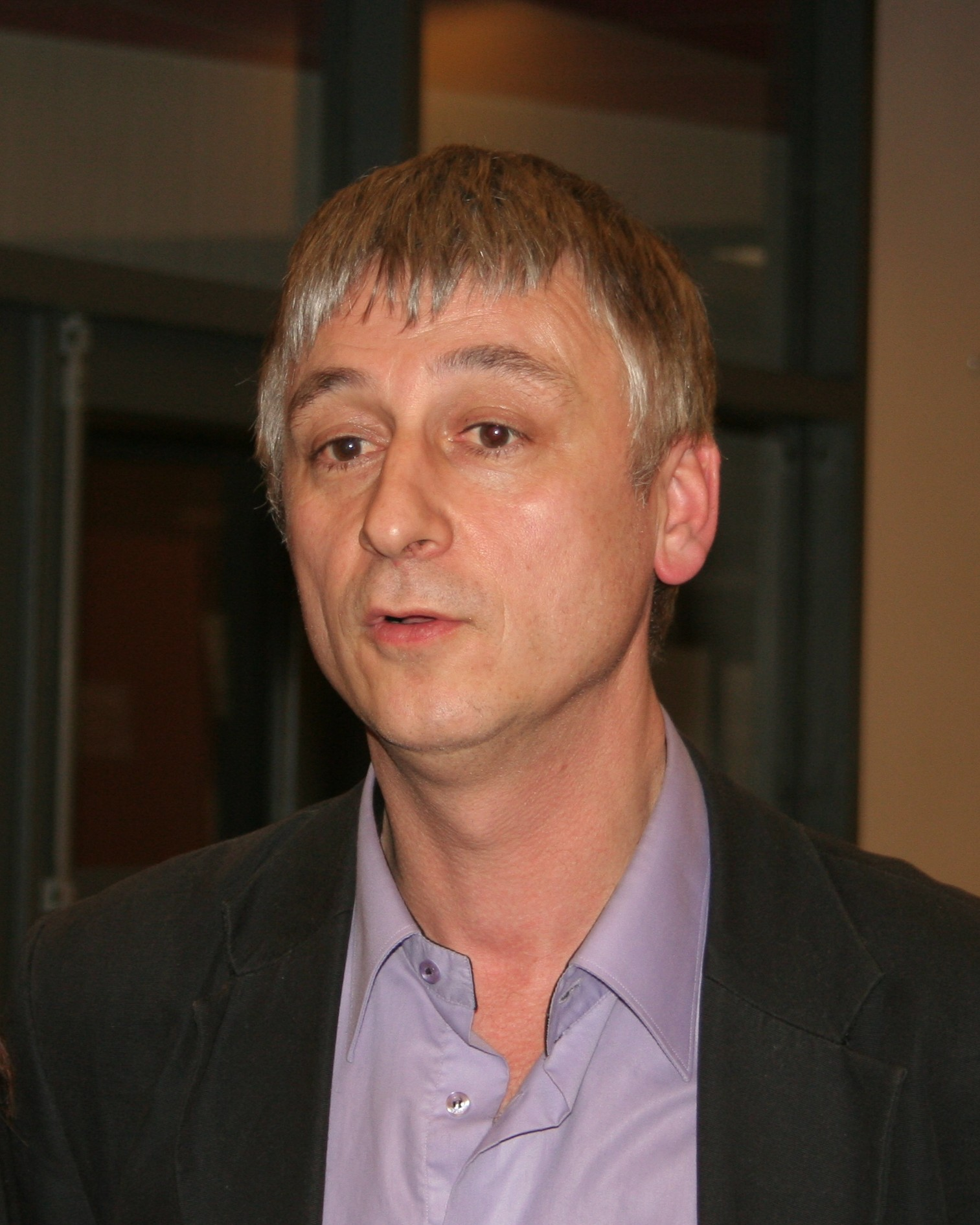
- Jacques Fernique in 2010

Member of the French Senate for Bas-Rhin
- Incumbent
- Assumed office 1 October 2020
- Preceded by: Jacques Bigot

Personal details
- Born: 13 November 1961 (age 64) Haguenau, France
- Party: Europe Ecology – The Greens

Jacques Fernique (born 13 November 1961) is a French politician and a member of Europe Écologie–The Greens.

He is regional councillor in Alsace for Europe Écologie–The Greens. In 2009, he was selected to be Europe Écologie–The Greens candidate in Alsace for the 2010 regional elections. He was elected Senator for Bas-Rhin on September 27, 2020.
