= Jacques Bigot (politician) =

French politician

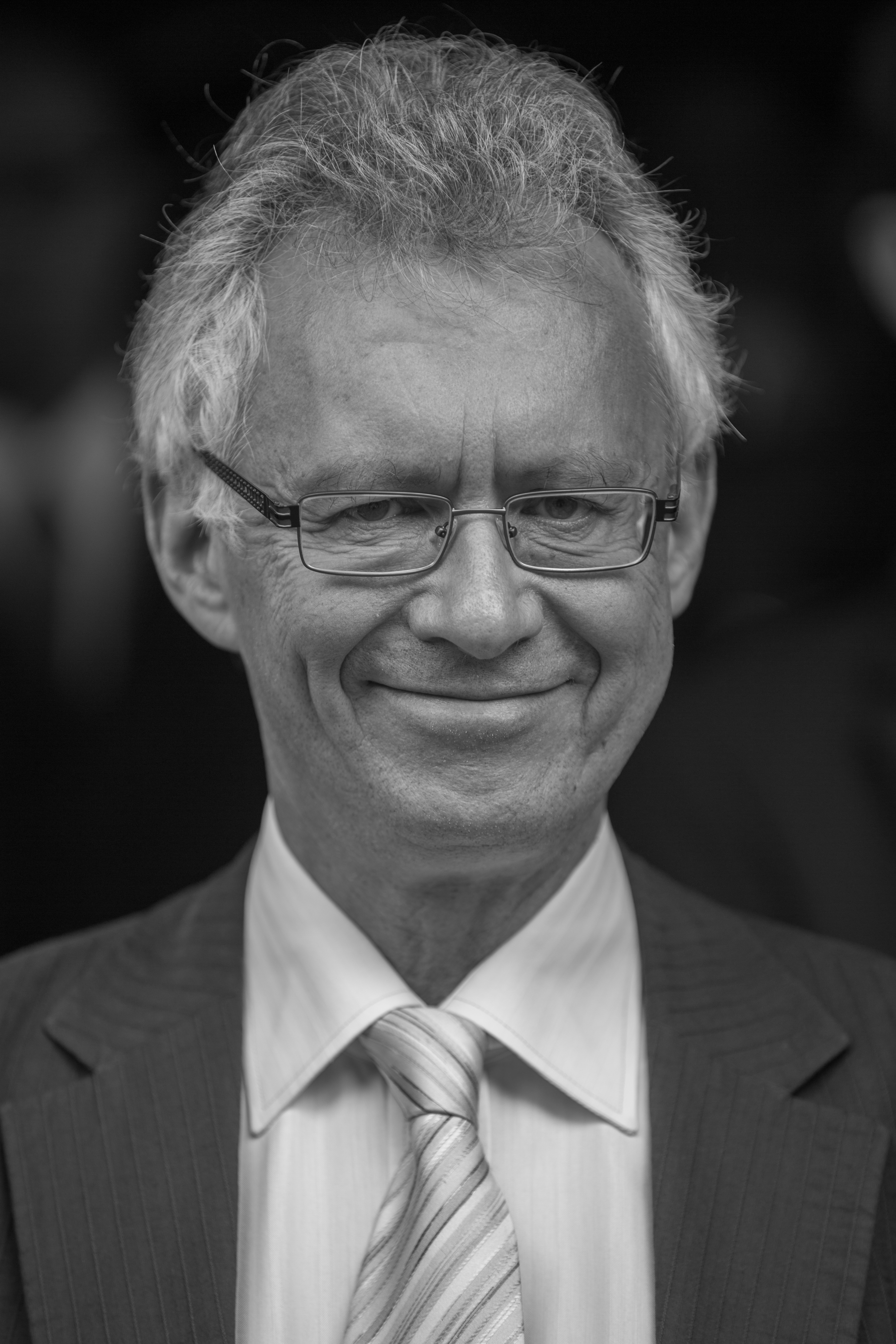
Portrait of Jacques Bigot

Jacques Bigot (French: [ʒak biɡo]; born July 31, 1952) is a French politician, Mayor of Illkirch-Graffenstaden and President of the Urban Community of Strasbourg. He is a member of the Socialist Party.

Member of the PS since the Pau Congress, he ran in the 1983 municipal elections on the Socialist list in Illkirch-Graffenstaden (Bas-Rhin), which was overwhelmingly defeated (26% of votes). Opposition councillor, he became the top candidate in the same town in the 1989 election, again without success, against the outgoing mayor in office since 1971.

In 1995, taking advantage of a disunited right, he was finally elected Mayor of Illkirch-Graffenstaden. During the Catherine Trautmann-Roland Ries, he was vice-president of the Urban Community of Strasbourg and chaired the Departmental Fire and Rescue (SDIS67).

In a negative national and regional context for the PS, he was re-elected mayor in 2001 with a 26-vote majority over the right and announced that it would be his last term. However, in 2008, he ran for a third term he was reelected in the first round with nearly 70% of the votes.

During the 2008 campaign, his name was mentioned as a favourite in the race for the presidency of the Urban Community of Strasbourg, and its nearly 500,000 residents in case of the victory of the left in the municipality of Strasbourg. Roland Ries (PS) was elected Mayor of Strasbourg and Bigot became President of the Urban Community of Strasbourg on April 18, 2008, with 62 votes in favour and 27 null votes.

Bigot was also the PS' top candidate in Alsace in the 1998 and 2004 regional election and currently chairs the Socialist Group in the Alsace Regional Council. He once again was the PS' top candidate in the 2010 elections.

In addition to his work in the Senate, Bigot served as member of the French delegation to the Parliamentary Assembly of the Council of Europe from 2015 until 2017. In this capacity, he was a member of the Committee on Legal Affairs and Human Rights and the Sub-Committee on the implementation of judgments of the European Court of Human Rights.
