= Pascal Canfin =

French politician (born 1974)

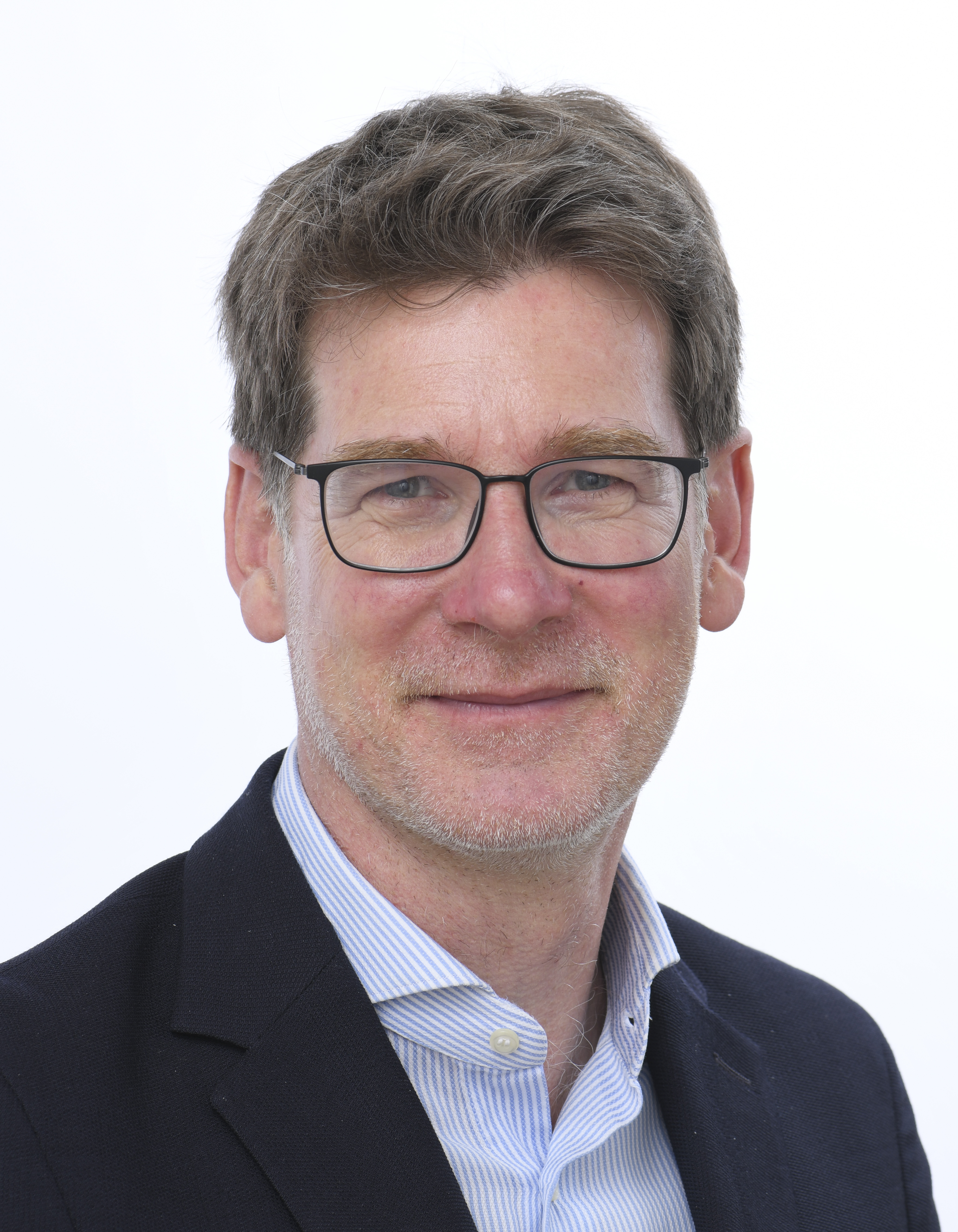
- Canfin in 2024

Member of the European Parliament for France
- Incumbent
- Assumed office 2 July 2019
- In office 14 July 2009 – 16 May 2012
- In office 3 May 2014 – 30 June 2014

Minister for Development
- In office 16 May 2012 – 31 March 2014
- Prime Minister: Jean-Marc Ayrault
- Preceded by: Henri de Raincourt
- Succeeded by: Annick Girardin

Personal details
- Born: 22 August 1974 (age 51) Arras, France
- Party: The Greens (before 2010); Europe Ecology – The Greens (2010–2019); En Marche (since 2019)
- Other political affiliations: Greens-European Free Alliance (before 2019); Renew Europe (since 2019)
- Education: Bordeaux Institute of Political Studies; Newcastle University

Pascal Canfin (French pronunciation: [paskal kɑ̃fɛ̃]; born 22 August 1974 in Arras) is a French politician of La République en marche (LREM) who has been serving as a Member of the European Parliament (MEP) since 2019. In the 2019 elections for the European Parliament, he was elected in the list of Renew Europe group and serves as chair of the Environment, Public Health and Food Safety Committee; following his initiative, the European Parliament declared in December 2019 a "climate state of emergency". He was re-elected in 2024.

Canfin was formerly the head of the French section of WWF until 25 March 2019, and Minister for Development under the Minister of Foreign Affairs in the Ayrault Cabinet. Canfin previously served as a Member of the European Parliament from 2009 to 2012. From July 2014 to December 2015, Canfin was the Senior Advisor on Climate at World Resources Institute (WRI), ranked the most influential think tank in the world on environmental issues, on the preparation of the International climate summit to be held in Paris in December 2015 (COP21). For this matter, he also co-chaired with Alain Grandjean the Commission for innovative financing for climate, mandated by the President of the French Republic.

In July 2025, he co-founds together with Éric Hazan and Sarah Faivre, La Plateforme progressiste, a project aimed at structuring consensus-building conferences within the progressive political spectrum. The first conclusions of which he presented in December 2025.

== Early life and career ==
Canfin graduated initially from the Bordeaux Institute of Political Studies (Sciences Po) and then from Newcastle University. Between 2003 and 2009, Canfin worked as journalist for the monthly magazine Alternatives économiques and a specialist for questions linked to the environment, social economy as well as corporate social responsibility. Prior to that, Canfain was a human resources consultant (1999–2003), after being a representative of the French Democratic Confederation of Labour (CFDT) trade union for Nord-Pas-de-Calais (1997–1999).

== Political career ==
Alongside his journalistic work, Canfin got politically involved with the Greens (France) in France. He was responsible for the party's Economic, Social and Public Services Committee between 2005 and 2009. Canfin has been a member of Europe Écologie–The Greens since its creation in 2010.

=== Member of the European Parliament, 2009-2012 ===
At the 2009 European elections, Canfin was third candidate on the list put up by Europe Écologie, an electoral alliance of which the Greens were part, in Île-de-France, behind Daniel Cohn-Bendit and Eva Joly. With 20.86% of the votes, Europe Écologie got four seats, and Canfin was elected a Member of the European Parliament on 7 June 2009.

In the European Parliament, Canfin served on the Committee on Economic and Monetary Affairs and was a substitute member of the Committee on Internal Market and Consumer Protection. He was also a Vice-Chairman of the Special Committee for the Financial, Economic and Social Crisis, a member of the Special Committee on Organised Crime in the EU, and a Vice-Chairman of the Public Services Intergroup.

Canfin was the rapporteur on the regulation of short selling and credit default swaps (CDS). His report was discussed in the Economic Affairs Committee in January 2011, and voted as such in the Plenary Session in July 2011. He has also been a negotiator on behalf of The Greens–European Free Alliance group on several legislative texts:

- Directive for a European Financial Transaction Tax (in process);
- Regulation on Credit Rating Agencies (in process);
- Markets in Financial Instruments Directive (MIFID) (in process);
- Directive on Alternative Investment Fund Managers (AIFM);
- European Market Infrastructure Regulation.

In June 2010, Canfin initiated a call to the MEPs of the Economic and Monetary Affairs Committee to create a non-governmental organisation capable of developing a counter-expertise on financial activities led by the main financial operators (banks, insurance companies, hedge funds etc.). The call was named Finance Watch. He was joined by about one hundred European, national and regional elected representatives within the European Union. A year later, in June 2011, Finance Watch was set up as a NGO.

=== Minister for Development ===
On 16 May 2012, Canfin left the European Parliament and was nominated by President François Hollande as Delegated Minister in charge of development with the Ministry of Foreign Affairs under minister Laurent Fabius. In one of his first announcements as Minister for Development, he considers that "France has normalized its political relations with Africa". In his opinion, this normalisation stands out in the change of the Ministry name: “the Cooperation Ministry, with all the implications that it brings, doesn’t exist anymore” he claims. Canfin adds "the dissolution of the "Africa cell", tipping point of Françafrique system, embodies the breakdown announces by François Hollande concerning relations between France and Africa.

==== Development policy and sustainable development ====
Canfin considers development policy as closely tied up with sustainable development aims. Indeed, he intends to "make sustainability an imperative for development French policy". In these way, undertaken projects under the aegis of "l’Agence française de développement" (AFD) have seen a turning point since the first year of his mandate: renewable energies and energy efficiency are now part of AFD investments priorities for the next three years. AFD has also adopted in April 2013 a new doctrine in agricultural matters and won't be able to finance nor GMO's projects or agricultural investments that wouldn't respect FAO principles against "land grabbing". Finally, AFD has adopted the principle that she “should include environmental and social responsibility in its procurement process”.

=== Member of the European Parliament, 2019–present ===
Following the elections in 2019, Canfin was elected on La République en Marche's Renaissance list. Member of the Renew group, he is elected chair of the Committee on the Environment, Public Health and Food Safety. Following his initiative, the European Parliament declared in December 2019 a "climate state of emergency". Also in December 2019, the Environment Committee adopts a resolution highlighting the weaknesses of the European Pollinator Initiative, which "fails to protect bees and other pollinators from some of the many causes of their decline".

Within the framework of the Green Deal presented by the European Commission, Canfin works in favour of carbon neutrality by 2050, a 50-55% reduction in greenhouse gas emissions by 2030 and a just transition. In January 2020, Politico Europe chose Canfin as number 1 on the "Top 20 MEPs to watch in 2020" list.

== Books ==
- Consommer responsable [Responsible Consuming]. 2008.
- L’Économie verte expliquée à ceux qui n’y croient pas [Green Economy Explained to Those Who Do Not Believe in It]. Petits Matins, 2007.
- Le Contrat écologique pour l’Europe [The Ecological Contract for Europe]. Petits Matins, 2009.
- Ce que les banques vous disent et pourquoi il ne faut presque jamais les croire [What Banks Tell You and Why You Should Almost Never Believe Them]. Petits Matins, 2012.
- 30 questions for understanding the Paris climate change Conference. Petits Matins, 2015.
