= Christophe Porquier =

French politician

Christophe Porquier is a French politician, a member of The Greens-Europe Écologie. He is a former municipal councillor in Amiens.

In 2009, he was selected to be The Greens-Europe Écologie's candidate in Picardy for the 2010 regional elections.
