= Party of the Corsican Nation =

Party of the Corsican Nation Partitu di a Nazione Corsa
- Leader: Jean-Christophe Angelini
- Founded: 7 December 2002
- Headquarters: 5 Bd de Montera, 20200 Bastia
- Ideology: Corsican nationalism Autonomism; Social democracy Left-wing nationalism
- Political position: Centre-left to left-wing
- European affiliation: European Free Alliance
- Colours: Orange, blue
- Corsican Assembly: 7 / 63
- National Assembly: 1 / 577
- Senate: 0 / 348
- European Parliament: 0 / 81

The Party of the Corsican Nation (Corsican: Partitu di a Nazione Corsa, PNC) is a Corsican nationalist and autonomist political party on the French island of Corsica. It was founded in Corte in 2002 by members of three nationalist parties, Union of the Corsican People (UPC), A Scelta Nova and A Mossa Naziunale.

The PNC advocates autonomy for Corsica. It rejects the violent action by the National Liberation Front of Corsica, as well as independence.

In the first round of the 2007 French presidential election the party supported Dominique Voynet, candidate for The Greens.

The party has one seat in the general council of Corse-du-Sud, eleven seats in the Corsican Assembly and one Member of the European Parliament, François Alfonsi elected in the 2009 European election (South-East) on the Europe Écologie list.

The party's candidate in the 2010 territorial elections, Gilles Simeoni won a record 18.4% of the vote in the first round and 25.88% in the runoff, his list winning 11 seats in the Corsican Assembly (up from five).

The PNC is a member of the European Free Alliance and is pro-European and regionalist.

It is part of the autonomist coalition Femu a Corsica ("Let's make Corsica"), grouping also the minor parties A Chjama and Inseme per a Corsica, that joined its evolution into a regionalist party of its own in 2017.
