= Alain Dolium =

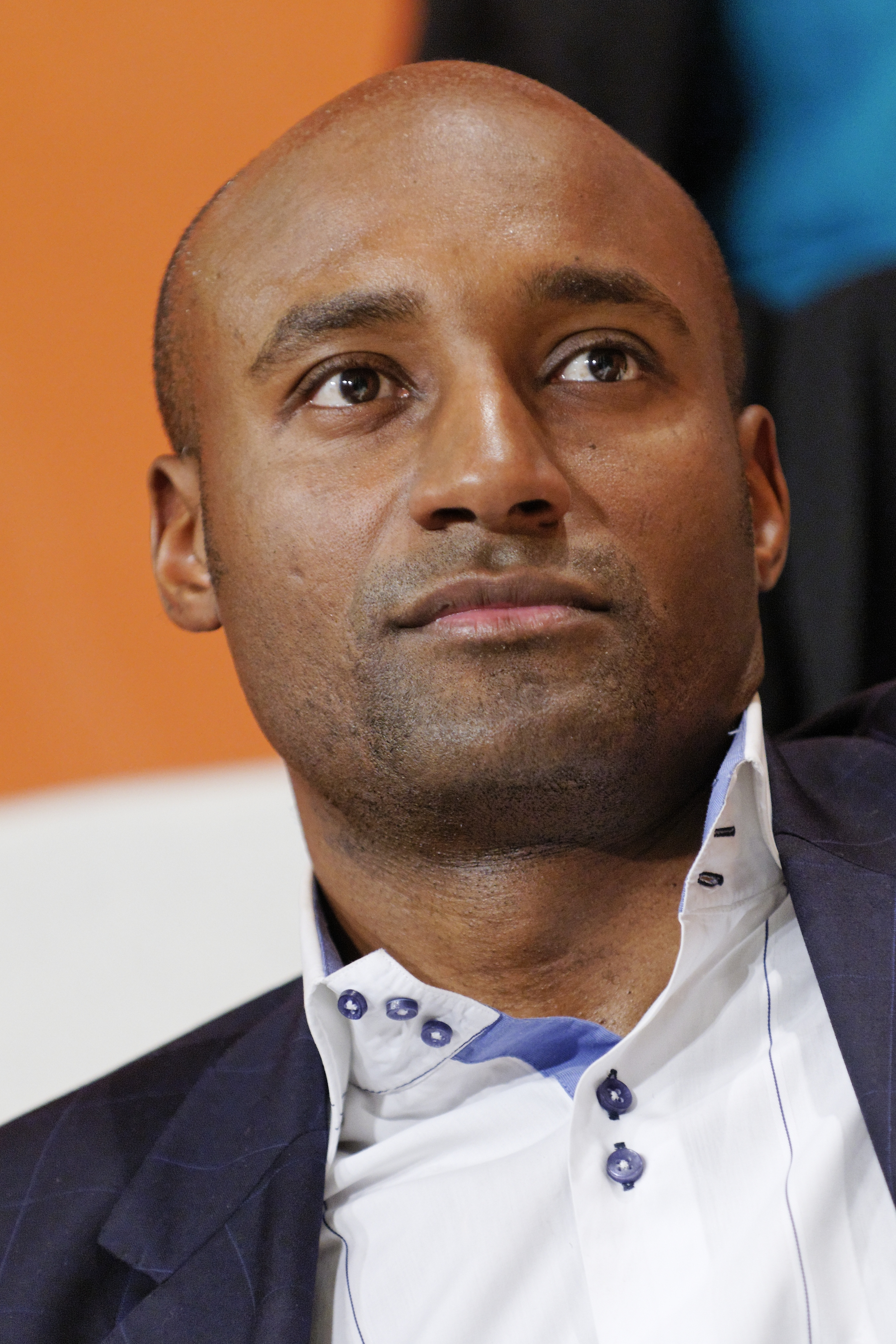
Alain Dolium

Alain Dolium (born 11 December 1967) is a French businessman, politician and a member of the MoDem.

Born to Antillean parents, he declares himself 'multicultural'. He was a successful businessman, notably serving in think-tanks committed to the integration of French suburban youth through affirmative action. Politically, he declared that he voted for Socialist candidate Lionel Jospin in 2002 but for centrist candidate François Bayrou in the first round of 2007 election before voting for Socialist Ségolène Royal in the runoff. He joined Bayrou's MoDem in 2008.

In 2009, he was selected to be the MoDem's candidate in Île-de-France for the 2010 regional elections.
