= Pau Congress =

The Pau Congress was the fifth national congress of the French Socialist Party (Parti socialiste or PS). It took place from 31 January to 12 February 1975. The "Epinay Coalition" between Mitterrand and Chevènement's CÉRÉS group ended and CÉRÉS joined the minority.

== Results ==
Popular vote
Mitterrand-Defferre-Mauroy-Rocard	68%
CÉRÉS	25.4%
Mollétists	3.4%
Arthur Notebart	2.9%

François Mitterrand was re-elected as First Secretary.
