= René Revol =

French politician (born 1947)

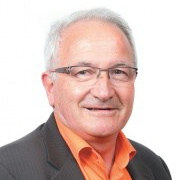

Mayor
- Incumbent
- Assumed office 17 March 2008
- Constituency: Grabels

Personal details
- Born: 22 November 1947 (age 78) La Mure (Isère)
- Party: PG

René Revol (born 22 November 1947 in La Mure, Isère) is a French politician and a member of the Left Party (PG). He is mayor of Grabels, a working-class suburb of Montpellier (Hérault) since 2008.

A former member of the Socialist Party's left-wing, he joined Jean-Luc Mélenchon and Marc Dolez's Left Party in 2008.

In 2010, he was selected to be the Left Front's candidate in Languedoc-Roussillon for the 2010 regional elections. His list also received the support of the New Anticapitalist Party (NPA), despite negotiations between the NPA and Left Front failing nationally.
