= Nathalie Revol =

French computer scientist

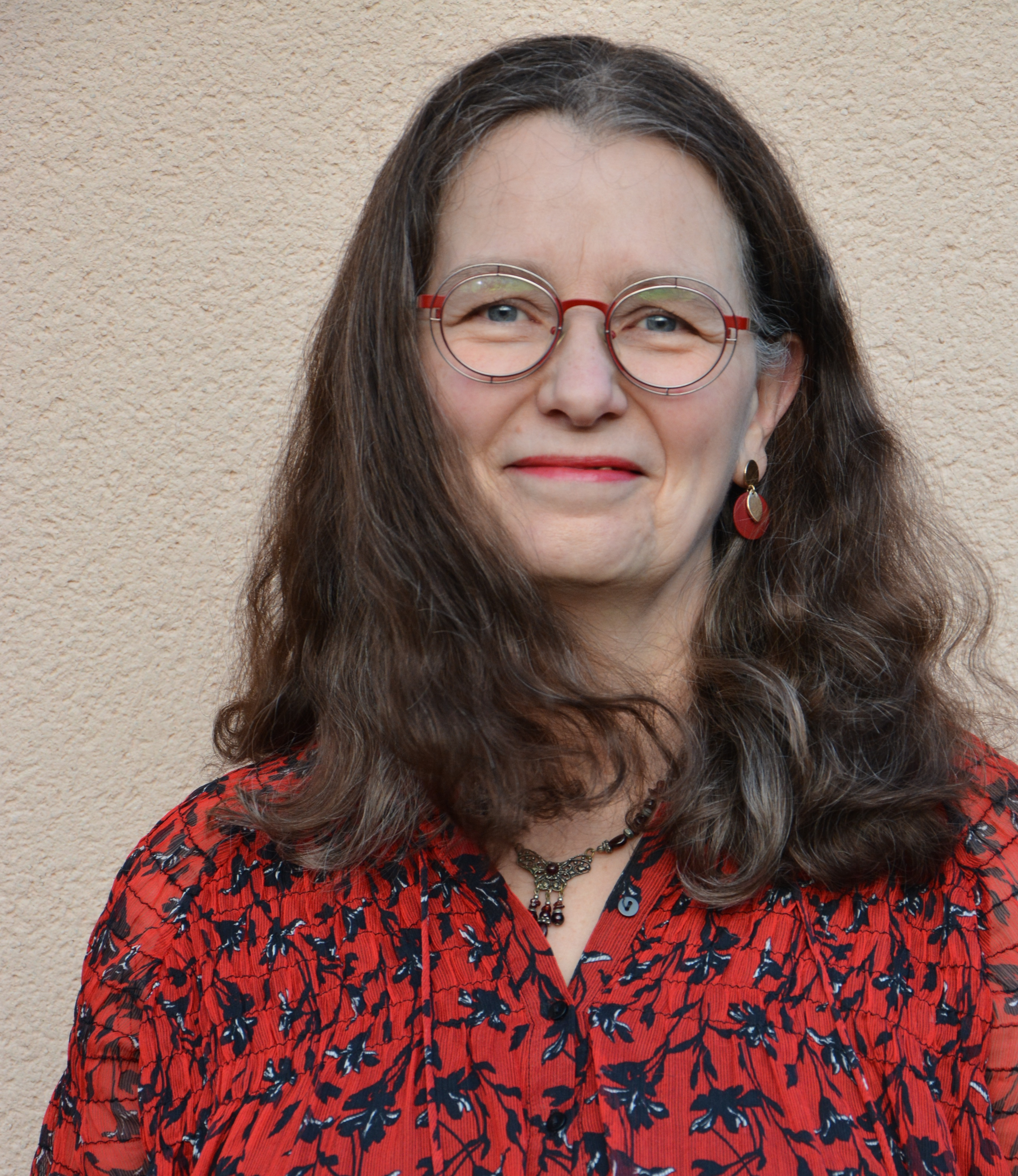
- Nathalie Revol, Lyon, 2025
- Born: December 4, 1967 (age 58); Saint-Etienne, France
- Education: lycée du Parc (classes préparatoires); ENSIMAG (engineer); Grenoble Institute of Technology (PhD)
- Known for: being chair of the IEEE 1788 working group, that led to the IEEE 1788-2015 Standard for Interval Arithmetic
- Scientific career
- Fields: Computer science
- Thesis: Complexity of the parallel evaluation of arithmetic circuits (1994)
- Doctoral advisor: Jean-Louis Roch, Jean Della Dora
- Doctoral students: Yahya Ould MOHAMED EL HADJ, Francisco Jose CHÁVES ALONSO, Hong Diep NGUYEN, Philippe THÉVENY

Nathalie Revol (born 1967) is a French computer scientist known for her research on computer arithmetic, including floating-point arithmetic and interval arithmetic. She is a researcher for the French Institute for Research in Computer Science and Automation (INRIA), associated with the arithmetic and computing project of the Laboratoire de l'Informatique du Parallélisme at the École normale supérieure de Lyon.

== Education and career ==
Revol studied computer science at the École nationale supérieure d'informatique et de mathématiques appliquées de Grenoble (ENSIMAG) from 1987 to 1990, earning an engineering diploma in 1990. From 1989 to 1990, she also studied applied mathematics at Joseph Fourier University in Grenoble, earning a Master of Advanced Studies in 1990. She defended her doctoral dissertation, Complexite de l'evaluation parallele des circuits arithmetiques [Complexity of the parallel evaluation of arithmetic circuits], in 1994 through the Grenoble Institute of Technology, under the joint supervision of Jean-Louis Roch and Jean Della Dora.

After a temporary research position at ENSIMAG, she became an associate professor at Lille University of Science and Technology in 1996. In 2002, she took her present position as a researcher for INRIA, and since 2020 has been a researcher "hors classe".

== Contributions ==
Revol chaired the working group that produced the IEEE 1788 standard for interval arithmetic. With Fabrice Rouillier, she developed the MPFI library for arbitrary-precision interval arithmetic.

She is a coauthor of the book Handbook of Floating-Point Arithmetic (Birkhäuser, 2010; 2nd ed., 2018).
