= François Alfonsi =

French politician (born 1953)

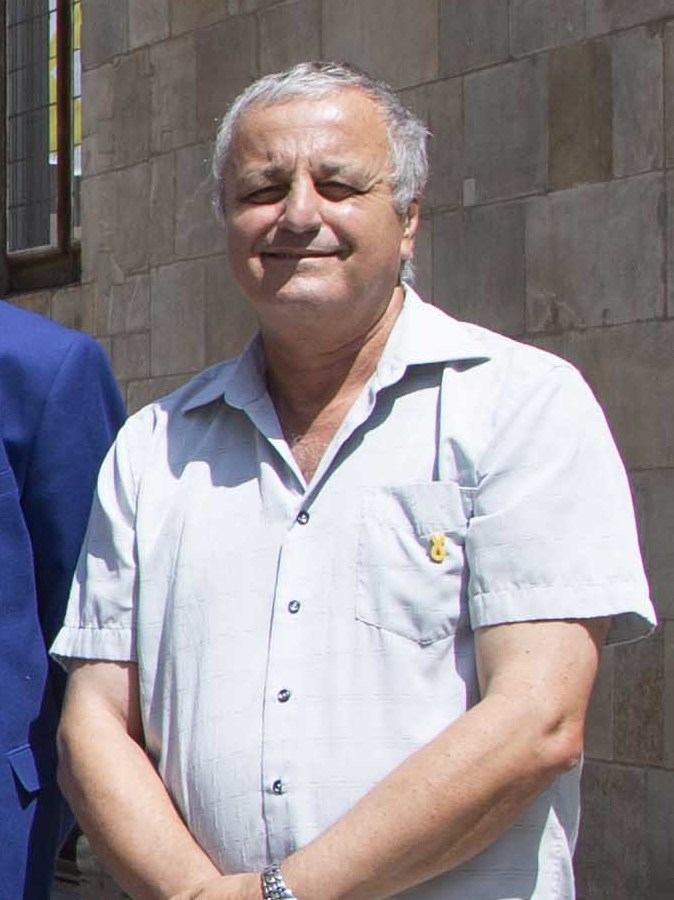

Member of the European Parliament
- In office 2 July 2019 – 15 July 2024
- Constituency: France
- In office 14 July 2009 – 30 June 2014
- Constituency: South-East France

President of the European Free Alliance
- In office 2014–2019
- Preceded by: Eric Defoort
- Succeeded by: Lorena López de Lacalle

Personal details
- Born: 14 September 1953 (age 72) Ajaccio, Corsica
- Party: Party of the Corsican Nation; Femu a Corsica

François Alfonsi (born 14 September 1953) is a French politician. He was a Member of the European Parliament from 2009 until 2014 for the South-East France constituency. He was reelected to that position in May 2019.

== Political career ==
Alfonsi has been a Corsican nationalist since the 1970s, and was elected in 1987 to the Corsican Assembly. He was Mayor of Osani from 2002 until 2020. He is currently a member of Femu a Corsica, after having been a member of the Party of the Corsican Nation (PNC).

In the 2009 European elections, Alfonsi was the second candidate on the Europe Écologie list in the South-East region, and was elected to the European Parliament. He was the second Corsican nationalist after Max Simeoni (Green, 1989–1994) to be elected to the European Parliament. Since 2021, he has been part of the Parliament's delegation to the EU-UK Parliamentary Assembly, which provides parliamentary oversight over the implementation of the EU–UK Trade and Cooperation Agreement.

In addition to his committee assignments, Alfonsi is a member of the European Parliament Intergroup on Traditional Minorities, National Communities and Languages.
