= René Souchon =

French politician (born 1943)

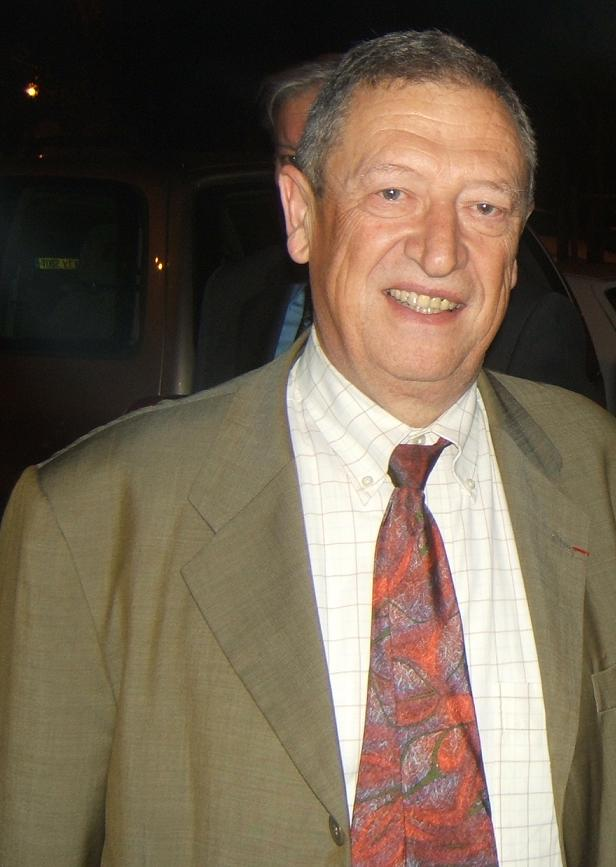

René Souchon (French pronunciation: [ʁəne suʃɔ̃]; born 12 March 1943 in Le Malzieu-Ville, Lozère) is a French politician of the Socialist Party (PS) who served as the regional president of the French region of Auvergne. He was first elected in 2006.

In the Socialist Party's 2011 primaries, Souchon endorsed Martine Aubry as the party's candidate for the 2012 presidential election.
