= Jean-Paul Besset =

French journalist and politician

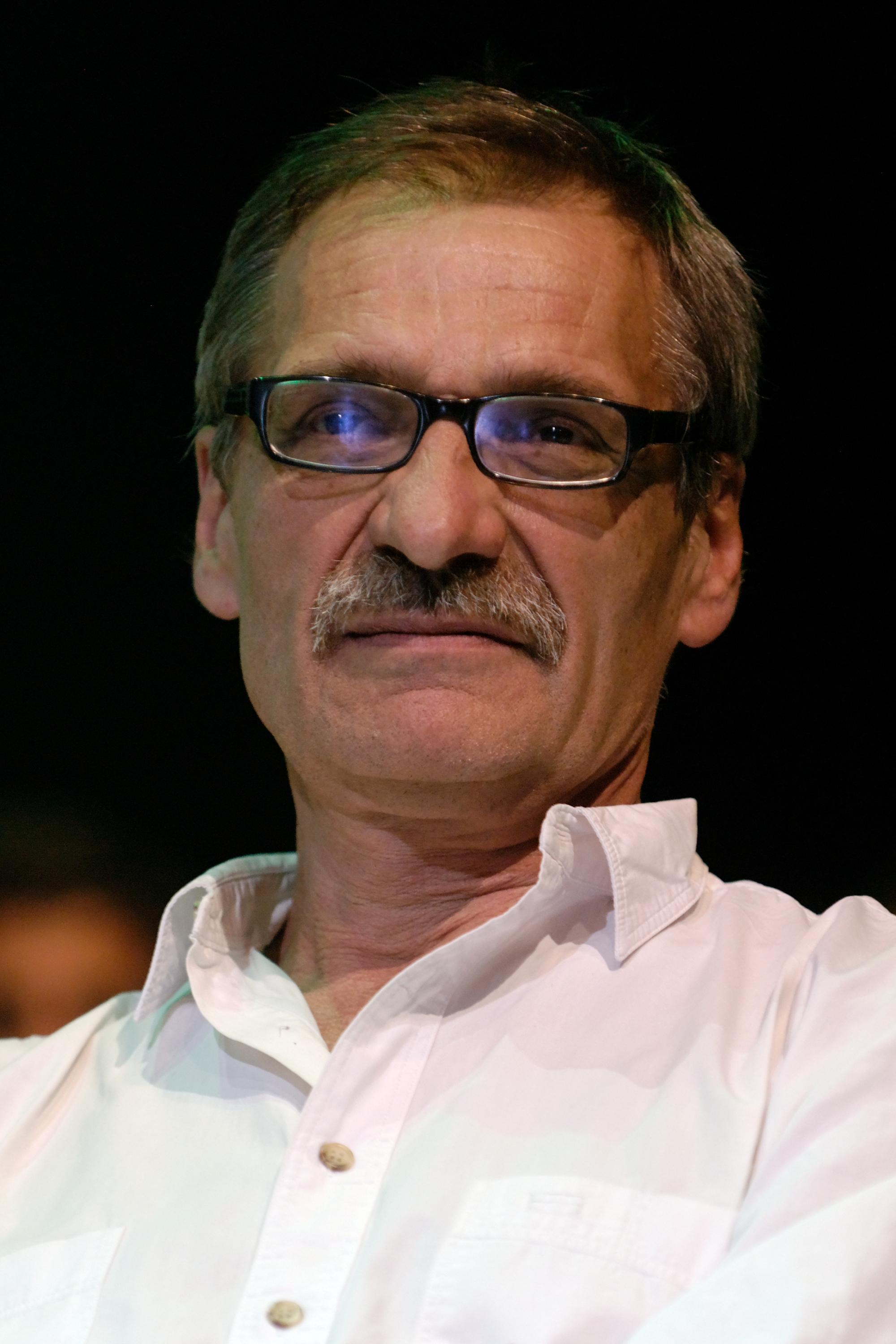

Jean-Paul Besset (born 1946 in Chamalières, Puy-de-Dôme) is a French politician and environmentalist.

An original member of the Revolutionary Communist League (LCR), he stayed in the LCR for eleven years, from its launch in 1974 until 1985.

As a founder of the Europe Écologie coalition in 2008, he was selected to lead the Europe Écologie list in the Massif Central constituency ahead of the 2009 European elections. During the 2014 European elections, his list receives 6,88% of the vote, down from the 13,58% of 2009, his party losing its only seat in the Massif Central constituency and his party going nationally from 12 in 2009 to 6 European seats after the elections. He leaves the party in January 2016 criticising «internal divisions and personal individualism».
