= 2004 Nord-Pas-de-Calais regional election =

← 1998	21 March 2004 (first round); 28 March 2004 (second round)	2010 →
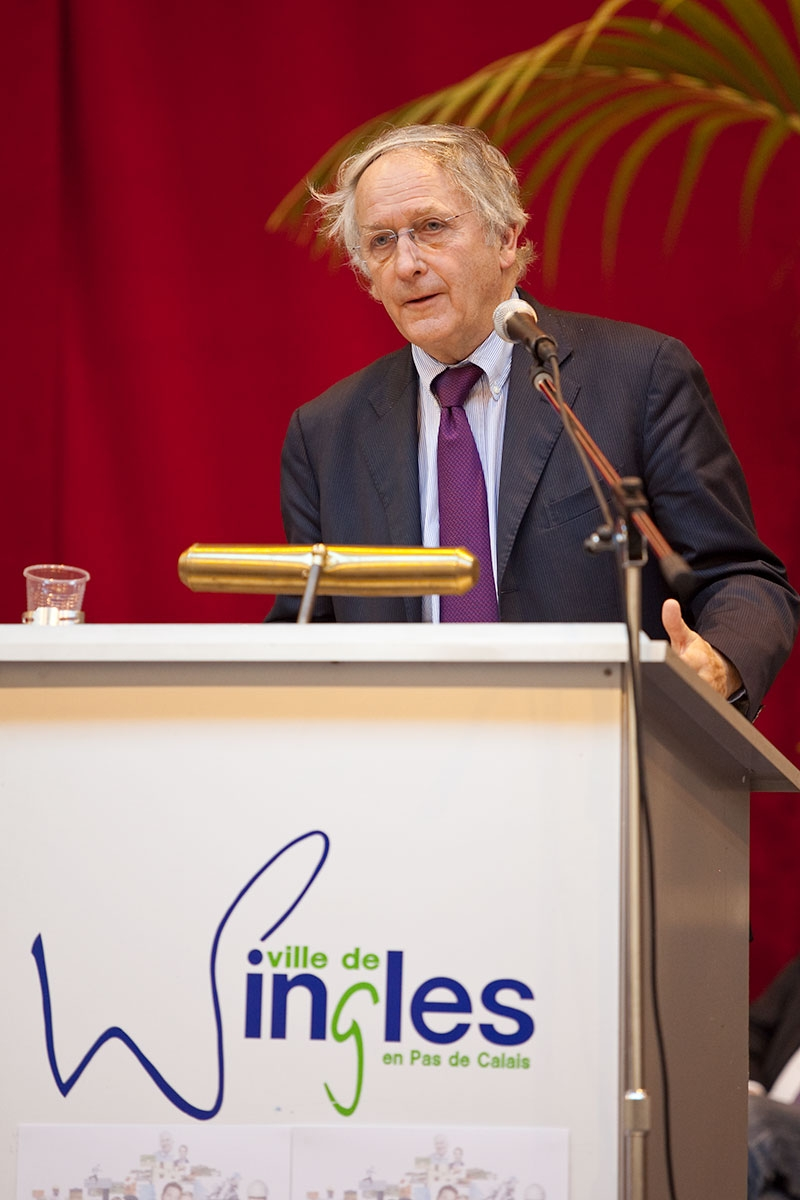

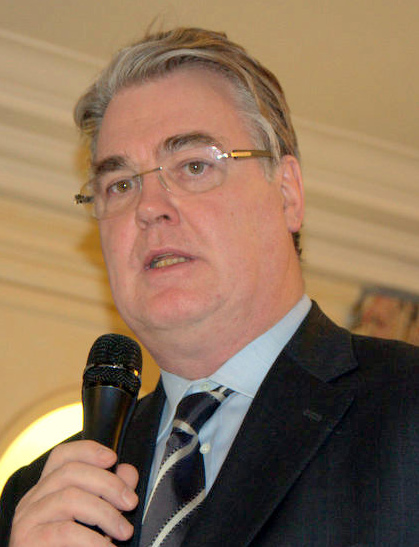

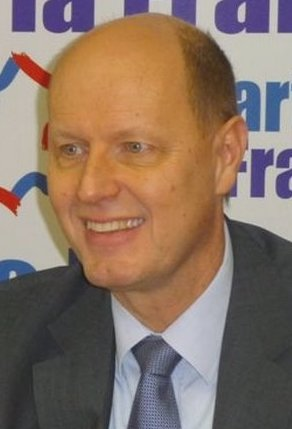
	First party	Second party	Third party
Leader	Daniel Percheron	Jean-Paul Delevoye	Carl Lang
Party	PS	UMP	RN
Seats won	73	24	16
Popular vote	883,885	484,817	336,434
Percentage	51.84%	28.43%	19.73%

A regional election took place in Nord-Pas-de-Calais on 21 and 28 March 2004, along with all other regions. Daniel Percheron (PS) was re-elected President of the Council.

== Results ==
Party	Presidential candidate	First round		Second round		Seats
Party	Presidential candidate	Votes	%	Votes	%	Seats
PS–PRG	Daniel Percheron	484,798	29.89	883,885	51.84	73
UMP–CNIP–FRS	Jean-Paul Delevoye	280,102	17.27	484,817	28.43	24
National Front	Carl Lang	290,908	17.94	336,434	19.73	16
French Communist Party	Alain Bocquet	173,200	10.68			0
Union for French Democracy	Valérie Létard	129,827	8.01			0
The Greens	Jean-François Caron	101,808	6.28			0
LO–LCR	Nicole Baudrin	82,868	5.11			0
Independent Ecological Movement	Henri Bailleul	33,230	2.05			0
Buralistes	Georges Hien	25,433	1.57			0
National Republican Movement	Yann Phelippeau	19,551	1.21			0
Droit de chasse	Jean-Marc Maurice	11	0.00			0
Total		1,621,736	100.00	1,705,136	100.00	113
Valid votes		1,621,736	94.69	1,705,136	95.70	
Invalid/blank votes		90,987	5.31	76,668	4.30	
Total votes		1,712,723	100.00	1,781,804	100.00	
Registered voters/turnout		2,790,865	61.37	2,791,231	63.84	
Source: Ministry of the Interior, Delwit
