= 1986 Corsican territorial election =

- 16 March 1986

All 61 seats in the Corsican Assembly 31 seats needed for a majority
- Registered: 207,162
- Turnout: 75.32%
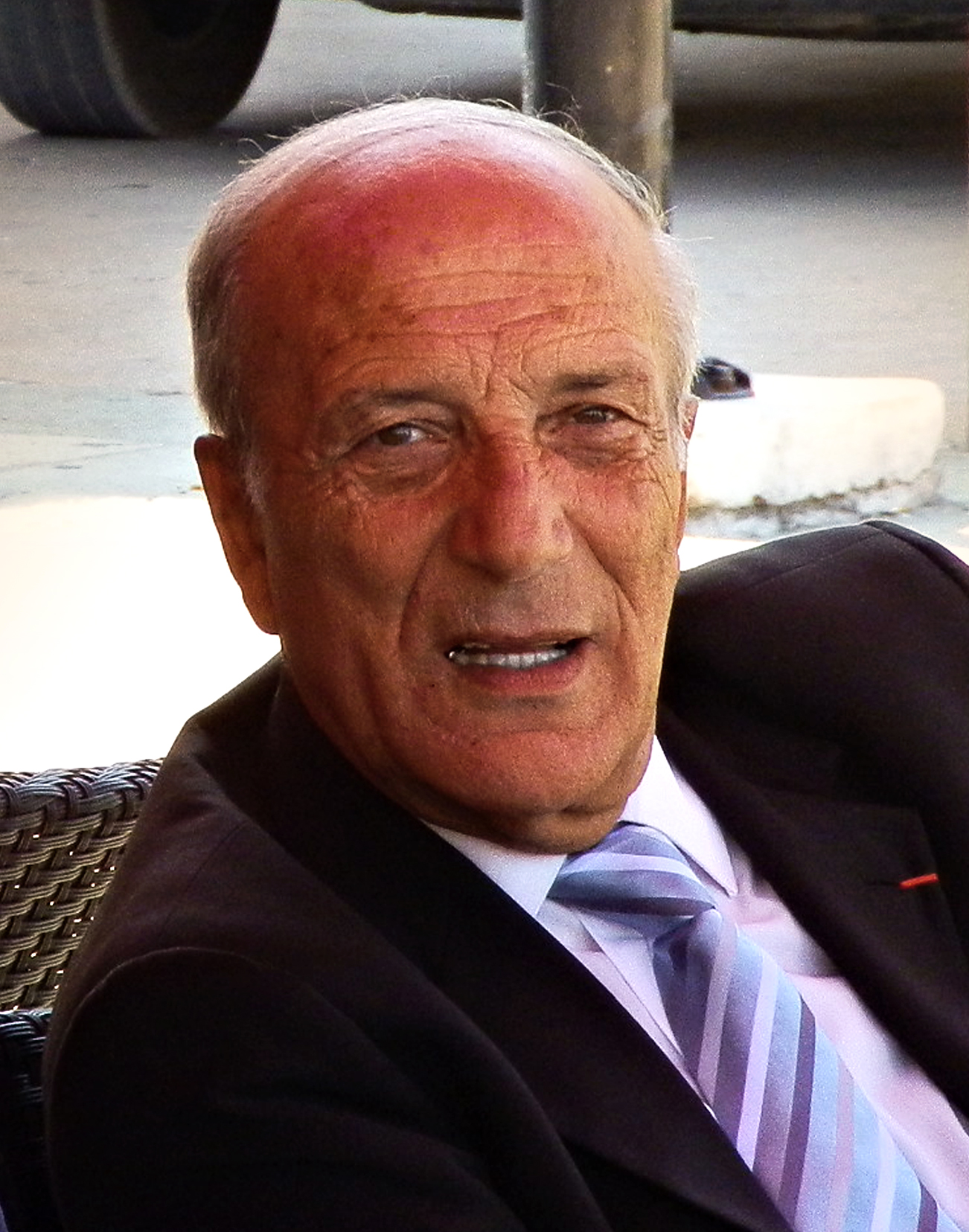

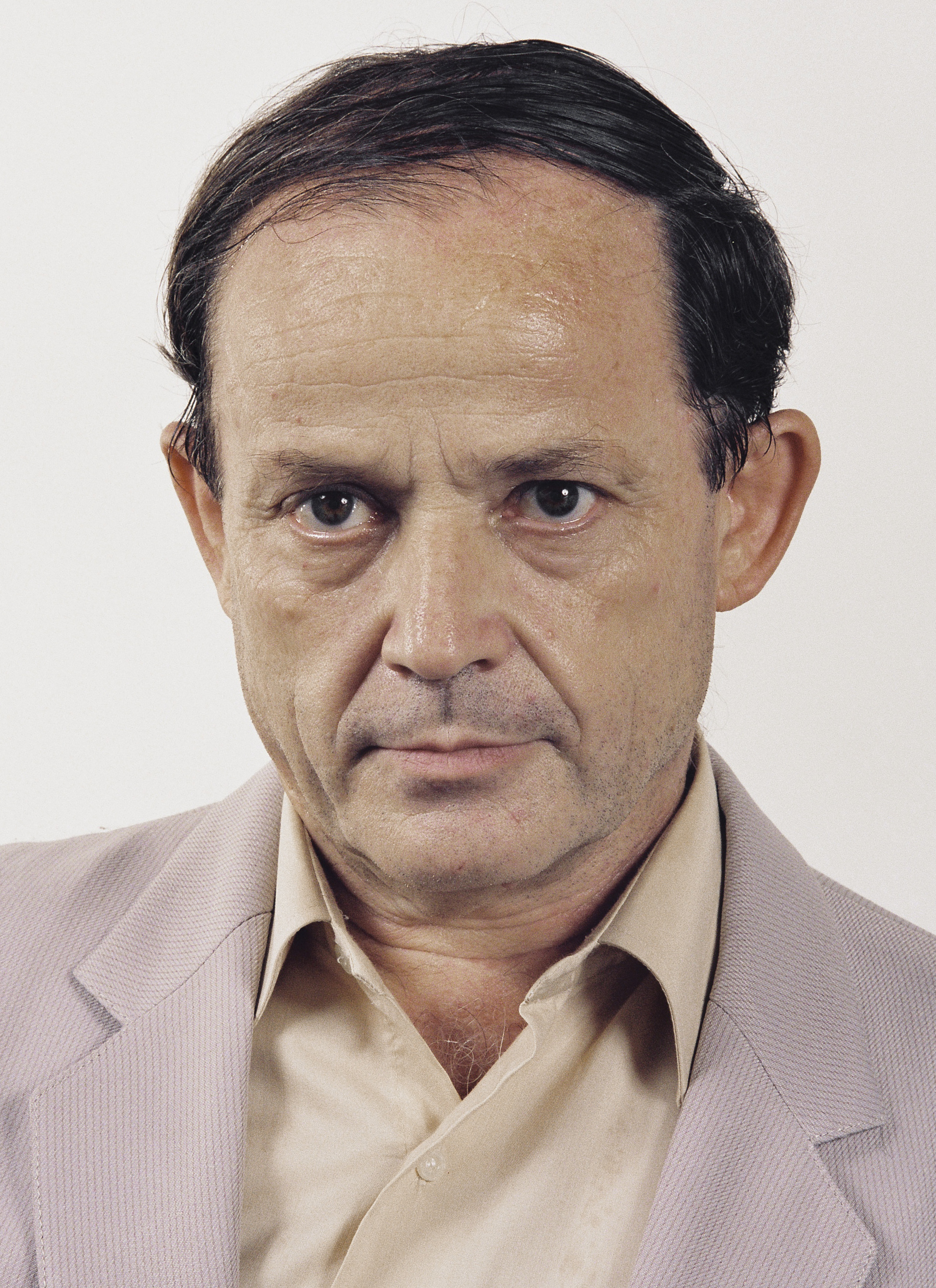
	Majority party	Minority party	Third party
Leader	Dominique Bucchini	Nicolas Alfonsi	Jean-Paul de Rocca Serra
Party	French Communist Party	Socialist Party-Movement of Radicals of the Left alliance	Union for French Democracy-Rally for the Republic-National Centre of Independents and Peasants-Bonapartist Central Committee alliance
Seats before	7	9	24 (19 UDF-RPR-CCB alliance, 5 CNIP)
Seats won	5	16	26
Seat change	▼2	▲7	▲2
	Fourth party	Fifth party
Leader	Pascal Arrighi	Max Simeoni
Party	Front National	Union of the Corsican People-Muvimentu Corsu per l'Autodeterminazione alliance
Seats before	6	6 (3 UPC, 3 MCA)
Seats won	2	6
Seat change	▼4	0

Legislative elections to the unicameral Corsican Assembly were held on 16 March 1986, alongside the regional elections held elsewhere in France. The recent decentralisation laws passed with the oversight of interior minister Gaston Defferre had given other regions regional councils, but Corsica's institutions, created from the 1982 Defferre accords, remained in tact, giving Corsica a more autonomous government than other regions.

As with the previous two Corsican elections in 1982 and 1984, it was difficult to garner a majority, as dissident parties and infighting were common. Leftist infighting resulted in a failure to properly create a coalition government as they had done in 1982, meaning the right got to retain the government and Jean-Paul de Rocca Serra maintained his position as president of the Corsican Assembly.

Just two days after the 1986 elections, Max Simeoni of the Union of the Corsican People, alongside other autonomists and nationalists, raised accusations of electoral fraud by authorities in Haute-Corse. After a lengthy investigation by the French Council of State, the results of the election were annulled in Haute-Corse, and a by-election to elect the 33 members of the Corsican Assembly who were registered in Haute-Corse were put up for re-election in the 1987 territorial by-election in Haute-Corse.
