= Simeoni =

Simeoni is an Italian surname or Corsican. Notable people with the surname include:

- Edmond Simeoni (1934-2018), Corsican political activist and nationalist;
- Filippo Simeoni (born 1971), Italian cyclist
- Gilles Simeoni (1967-), Corsican politician, son of Edmond Simeoni and nephew of Max;
- Giovanni Simeoni (1816–1892), Italian Roman Catholic archbishop and cardinal
- Luca Simeoni (born 1990), Italian footballer
- Max Simeoni (1929–2023), Corsican physician and politician
- Roldano Simeoni (born 1948), Italian water polo player
- Sara Simeoni (born 1953), Italian high jumper

== See also ==
- Simeone
