= Prosper Alfonsi =

- Alfonsi in 1982

President of the Corsican Assembly
- In office 20 August 1982 – 24 August 1984
- Preceded by: Position established
- Succeeded by: Jean-Paul de Rocca Serra

Mayor of Albertacce
- In office 21 March 1965 – 1985

Departmental Councillor of Corsica

Assembly Member for Calacuccia
- In office 24 April 1955 – 30 September 1973

Personal details
- Born: 17 June 1920 Albertacce, Corsica, France
- Died: 15 March 1991 (aged 70) Albertacce, Corsica, France
- Party: Radical Left Movement

Prosper Alfonsi (17 June 1920 – 15 March 1991) was a Corsican politician who served as the first president of the Corsican Assembly from 1982 to 1984.

Born in Albertacce, a village in northern Corsica, Alfonsi operated as a shopkeeper in the town for most of his early life. In the 1955 cantonal elections, Alfonsi was elected departmental councillor of Corsica (then one department), and was elected mayor of his hometown ten years later.

Following the 1982 Corsican territorial election, the first elections held for the Corsican Assembly following the Defferre accords, Alfonsi was elected president of the Corsican Assembly by a fragile left-wing coalition that formed immediately following the elections. He caused a fracture within the Corsican division of the Radical Left Movement due to his support for Corsican autonomy and the government recognition of a "Corsican people". Following the collapse of the left-wing coalition and the failure of a budget bill shot down by the right, Alfonsi was advised by interior minister Gaston Defferre (architect of the Corsican government of the time), on 11 May, to dissolve the assembly and hold new elections with a 3% vote threshold for proportional representation within the assembly. The assembly was dissolved on 29 June. Following the 1984 Corsican territorial election, Jean-Paul de Rocca Serra was elected president of the Corsican Assembly, replacing Alfonsi.
