= 2004 French regional elections =

- 21 March and 28 March 2004

26 Regional Presidencies
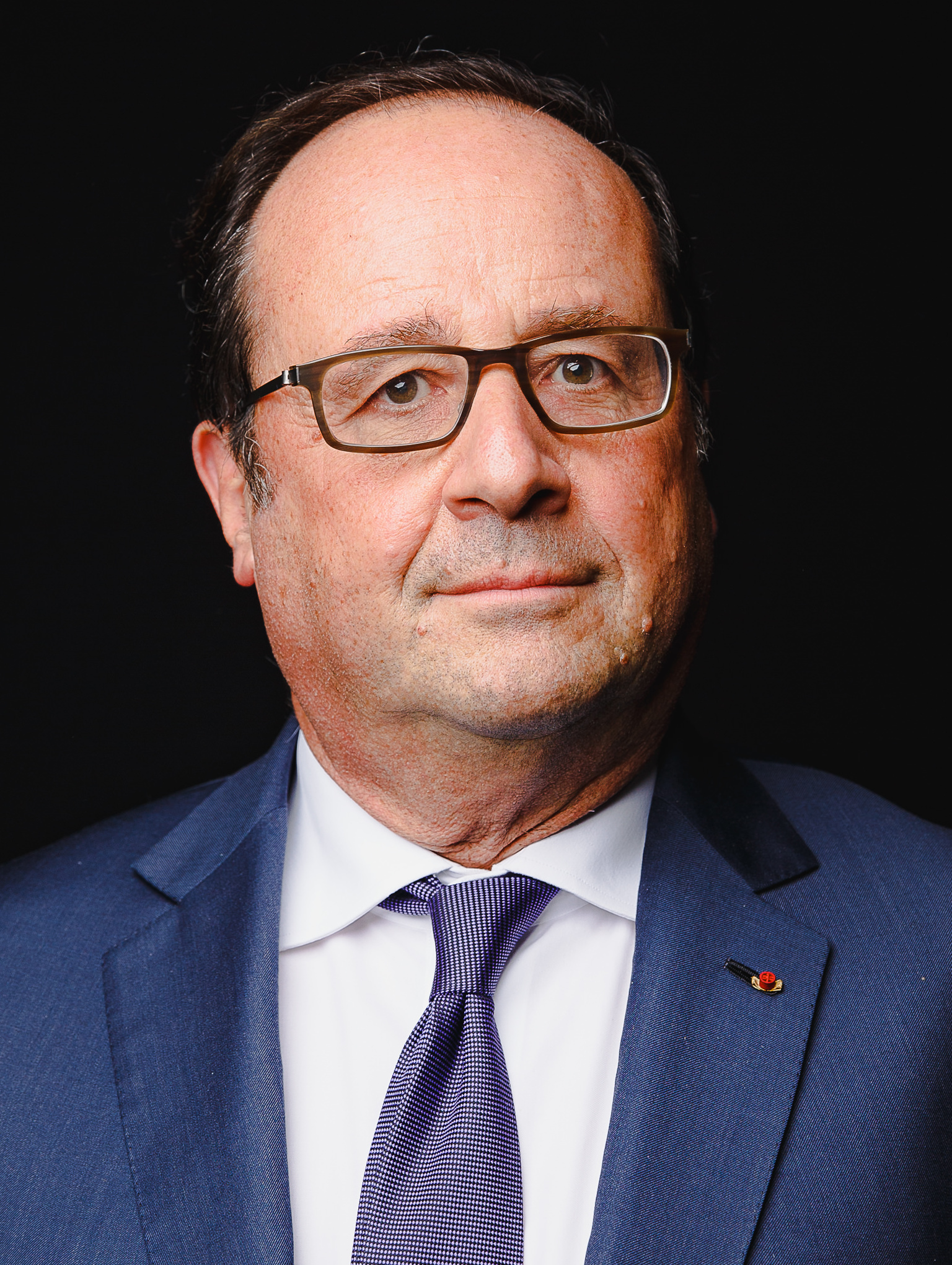

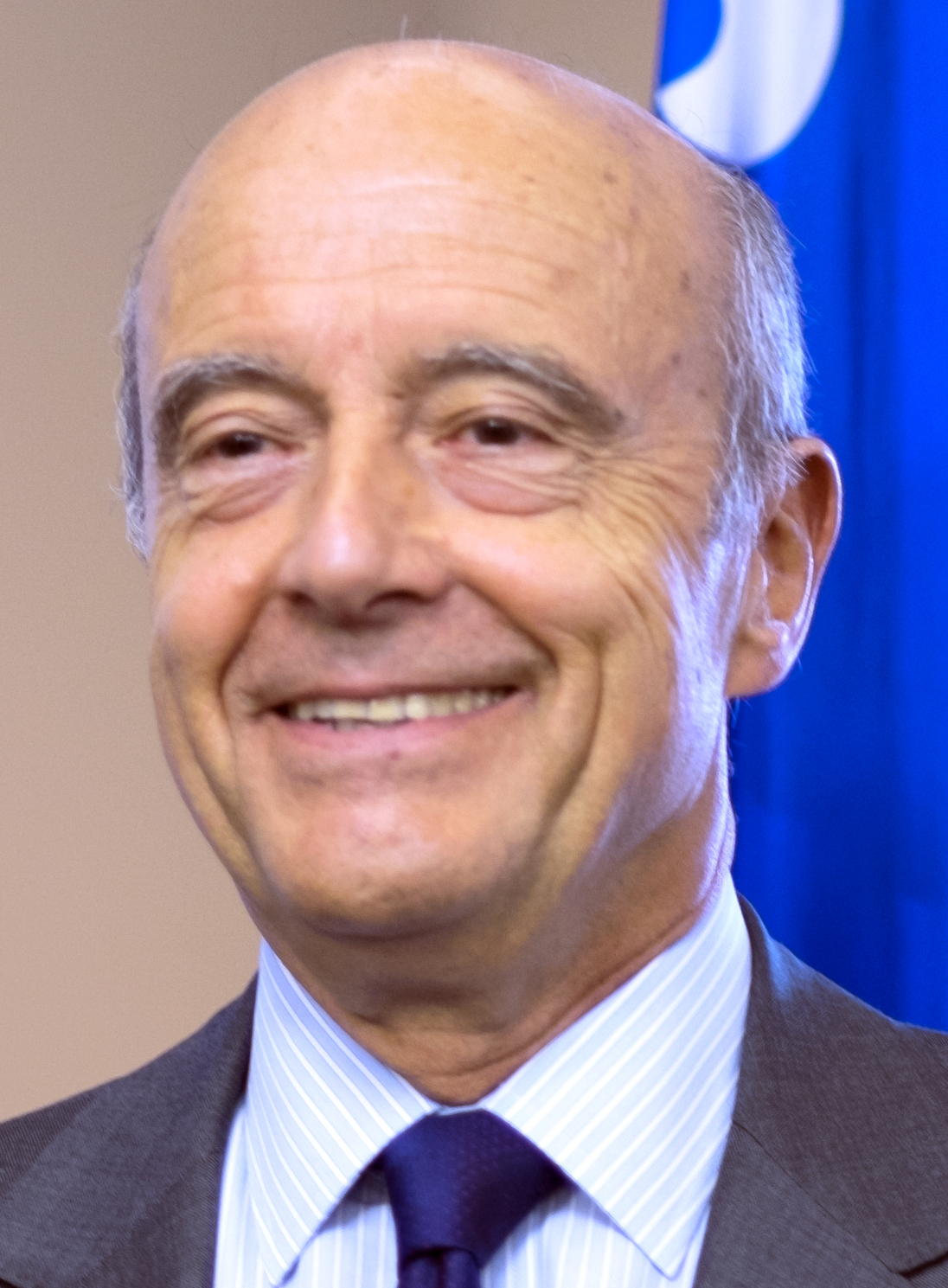

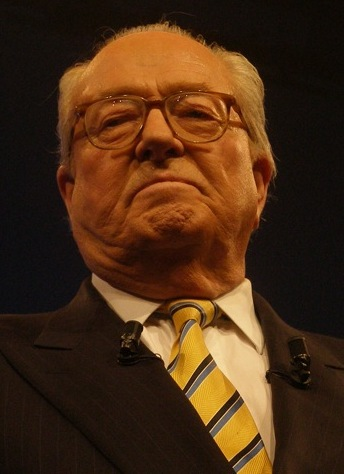
	First party	Second party	Third party
Leader	François Hollande	Alain Juppé	Jean-Marie Le Pen
Party	PS	UMP	FN
Regions won	23	2	0
Change	▲12	▼12	Steady
First round	8,938,695	8,179,866	3,564,059
Percentage	36.86%	33.73%	14.7%
Second round	12,896,820	9,519,416	3,199,392
Percentage	49.91%	36.84%	12.38%
Second round results by region.
Union for a Popular Movement Socialist Party	Martinican Independence Movement Communist Party of Réunion Miscellaneous left

Regional elections in were held in France on 21 and 28 March 2004. At stake were the presidencies of each of France's 26 regions which, although they do not have legislative powers, manage sizeable budgets. The results were a triumph for the parties of the left, led by the French Socialist Party (PS) in alliance with minor parties, including the French Communist Party (PCF), the Left Radical Party (PRG) and The Greens (Les Verts). The left has usually fared moderately well in regional elections, but this was their best result since the regional system was introduced.

The left won control of twenty of the twenty-two regions of metropolitan France, defeating the parties of the mainstream right, the Union for a Popular Movement (UMP) and the Union for French Democracy (UDF), and the extreme right National Front (FN). The results were seen as a major setback for the then President Jacques Chirac and Prime Minister Jean-Pierre Raffarin.

== National results ==
Grouping	Parties	Votes (Round One)	% (Round One)	Votes (Round Two)	% (Round Two)	Regions	Seats
Left	PS-Verts-PCF-PRG-MRC-DVG	8,938,695	36.86%	12,896,820	49.91%	23	1,126
Right	UMP-UDF-MPF-DVD	8,179,866	33.73%	9,519,416	36.84%	2	522
FN	FN	3,564,059	14.70%	3,199,392	12.38%	–	156
Far-left	LCR/LO	1,199,190	4.95%	–	–	–	–
The Greens	Les Verts-UDB-PO	546,474	2.25%	–	–	–	–
CPNT	CPNT	397,024	1.64%	–	–	–	–
Ecologists	MEI-GE-CAP21	385,481	1.59%	–	–	–	–
Far-Right	MNR-Alsace d'abord	349,181	1.44%	–	–	–	–
Miscellaneous Left		252,620	1.04%	111,720	0.43%	–	36
Miscellaneous Right		179,015	0.74%	11,094	0.04%	–	4
Miscellaneous		164,397	0.68%	–	–	–	–
Regionalists	MIM-Corsican regionalists	94,351	0.39%	99,512	0.39%	1	36
Total		24,250,353	100.00%	25,837,954	100.00%	26	1,880

== Results by region ==
The first round was held on 21 March. Since no candidate gained a majority in any region, a second round was held on 28 March, in which only candidates who polled more than 10% in the first round were eligible to run (except in Corsica, where the threshold is 5%). The UMP seat numbers are compared to those of the RPR and RPR dissidents together in 1998, the UDF seat numbers are compared to those of the UDF and UDF dissidents together in 1998.

=== Alsace ===
See Alsace Regional Council

Candidate	Party	Votes (Round One)	% (Round One)	Votes (Round Two)	% (Round Two)
Adrien Zeller (incumbent)	UMP	225,193	34.06%	299,353	43.56%
Jacques Bigot	PS-Verts	133,038	20.12%	236,709	34.44%
Patrick Binder	FN	122,860	18.58%	151,187	22.00%
Robert Spieler	Alsace d'abord	62,253	9.42%	–	–
Antoine Waechter	MEI	48.949	7.40%	–	–
Alfred Wahl	PCF-PRG-MRC	24,692	3.73%	–	–
Patrick Merck	Divers	23,540	3.56%	–	–
Françoise Ruch	LCR/LO	20,004	3.03%	–	–
Pascale Grauss	Federalist Party	578	0.09%	–	–
Total		661,107	100,00%	687,249	100,00%

==== Regional Council ====
Party		seats	change +/-
•	Union for a Popular Movement	18	+11
	Socialist Party	8	–
	National Front	8	-5
•	Union for French Democracy	7	-2
	The Greens	4	+3
•	Miscellaneous Right	2	-1
	Alsace d'Abord	0	-3
	Women of Alsace	0	-2
	Independent Ecological Movement	0	-1

Conservative Alsace is one of only two regions retained by the right.

=== Aquitaine ===
Candidate	Party	Votes (Round One)	% (Round One)	Votes (Round Two)	% (Round Two)
Alain Rousset (incumbent)	PS-PRG-Verts	516,392	38.42%	769,893	54.87%
Xavier Darcos	UMP-CNIP	247,232	18.40%	469,386	33.46%
Jacques Colombier	FN	153,859	11.45%	163,731	11.67%
François Bayrou	UDF	215,796	16.06%	–	–
Jean Saint-Josse	CPNT	96,925	7.21%	–	–
Annie Guilhamet	PCF-MRC	58,485	4.35%	–	–
Martine Mailfert	LCR/LO	55,215	4.11%	–	–
Total		1,343,904	100.00%	1,403,010	100.00%

==== Regional Council ====
Party		seats	change +/-
•	Socialist Party	43	+15
	Union for a Popular Movement	12	-1
	Union for French Democracy	9	-6
•	The Greens	9	+6
	National Front	7	-2
•	Miscellaneous Left	4	+4
•	Left Radical Party	1	+1
	Hunting, Fishing, Nature, Traditions	0	-8
	French Communist Party	0	-8
	Citizen and Republican Movement	0	-1

Aquitaine is a traditional stronghold of the left.

=== Auvergne ===
Candidate	Party	Votes (Round One)	% (Round One)	Votes (Round Two)	% (Round Two)
Pierre-Joël Bonté	PS	167,433	28.22%	333,301	52.67%
Valéry Giscard d'Estaing (incumbent)	UMP-UDF-FRS	215,921	36.39%	299,483	47.33%
Louis de Condé	FN	56,874	9.58%		
André Chassaigne	PCF	54,609	9.20%	–	–
Yves Gueydon	Verts	33,272	5.61%	–	–
Marie Savre	LCR/LO	25,389	4.28%	–	–
Hugues Auvray	Miscellaneous Right-wing	20,498	3.45%	–	–
Hubert Constancias	MEI-Mouvement Hommes-Animaux-Nature	20,498	3.45%	–	–
Claude Jaffrès	MNR	6,108	1.03%	–	–
Total		593,391	100.00%	632,784	100.00%

==== Regional Council ====
Party		seats	change +/-
•	Socialist Party	18	+7
	Union for a Popular Movement	12	+4
•	French Communist Party	7	+1
•	The Greens	5	+2
	Union for French Democracy	3	-6
	Miscellaneous Right	1	-2
	Movement for France	1	–
	National Front	0	-4
•	Miscellaneous Left	0	-1
	Ecology Generation	0	-1

The former President of France, Valéry Giscard d'Estaing, was seeking a fourth term as President of Auvergne.

=== Brittany ===
Results of the 2004 Brittany regional election
Leader Party (alliance members)	First round		Second round		Seats	
Leader Party (alliance members)	Votes	%	Votes	%	#	%
Jean-Yves Le Drian Socialist Party (PCF - PRG)	521,823	38.47	840,989	58.78	58	69.90
Pascale Loget The Greens (UDB - Frankiz Breizh)	131,550	9.70	840,989	58.78	58	69.90
Josselin de Rohan Union for a Popular Movement	347,134	25.59	589,637	41.22	25	30.10
Bruno Joncour Union for French Democracy	150,078	11.06	589,637	41.22	25	30.10
Brigitte Neveux National Front	114,926	8.47				
Françoise Dubu Revolutionary Communist League (LO)	64,868	4.78				
Lionel David National Republican Movement	26,074	1.92				
Registered voters	2,207,064	100	2,206,047	100		
Abstentions	785,758	35.60	708,830	32.13		
Voters	1 421 306	64.40	1,497,217	67.87		
White and rejected ballots	64.853	4.56	66.591	4.45		
Valid votes	1.356,453	95.44	1,430,626	95.55		

==== Regional Council ====
Party		seats	change +/-
•	Socialist Party	36	+11
	Union for a Popular Movement	14	-3
	Union for French Democracy	9	-8
•	French Communist Party	7	+1
•	The Greens	7	+4
•	Breton Democratic Union	4	+4
•	Left Radical Party	2	+2
	Miscellaneous Left	2	-1
•	Miscellaneous Left	1	+1
	National Front	0	-7
	Hunting, Fishing, Nature, Traditions	0	-1
	Ecology Generation	0	-1
	Workers' Struggle	0	-1
	Revolutionary Communist League (France)	0	-1
	MRV-CAP	0	-1

Normally conservative Brittany is captured by the left.

=== Burgundy ===
Candidate	Party	Votes (Round One)	% (Round One)	Votes (Round Two)	% (Round Two)
François Patriat	PS-PCF-PRG-Verts	240,445	36.01%	369,288	52.49%
Jean-Pierre Soisson (incumbent)	UMP-MDR	145,428	21.78%	226,148	32.14%
Pierre Jaboulet-Vercherre	FN	105,270	15.77%	108,133	15.37%
François Sauvadet	UDF	88,674	12.98%	–	–
Julien Gonzalez	MEI	34,810	5.21%	–	–
Jacqueline Lambert	LCR/LO	26,191	3.92%	–	–
Joël Mekhantar	MRC	17,213	2.58%	–	–
Claude Moreau	MNR	11,701	1.75%	–	–
Total		669,732	100.00%	703,569	100.00%

==== Regional Council ====
Party		seats	change +/-
•	Socialist Party	23	+8
	Union for a Popular Movement	14	+1
	National Front	6	-3
•	French Communist Party	6	+2
•	The Greens	6	+4
•	Left Radical Party	2	+1
	Union for French Democracy	0	-8
	Hunting, Fishing, Nature, Traditions	0	-2
	Movement for France	0	-1
	Citizen and Republican Movement	0	-1
	Miscellaneous Left	0	-1

Burgundy returned to its usual left-wing loyalty. It is suspected that the incumbent Jean-Pierre Soisson was punished for his coalition with the National Front.

=== Centre ===
Candidate	Party	Votes (Round One)	% (Round One)	Votes (Round Two)	% (Round Two)
Michel Sapin (incumbent)	PS-PCF-PRG-Verts-MRC	378,235	38.15%	517,990	49.15%
Serge Vinçon	UMP-MPF	205,262	20.71%	362,373	34.39%
Jean Verdon	FN	173,651	17.52%	173,463	16.46%
Jacqueline Gourault	UDF-CAP21	135,779	13.70%	–	–
Jean-Jacques Prodhomme	LCR/LO	55,640	5.61%	–	–
François Caré	CPNT	42,793	4.32%	–	–
Total		991,360	100.00%	1,053,826	100.00%

==== Regional Council ====
Party		seats	change +/-
•	Socialist Party	25	+5
	Union for a Popular Movement	13	-2
•	French Communist Party	13	+4
	National Front	9	-4
•	The Greens	8	+5
	Union for French Democracy	7	-7
•	Left Radical Party	2	+1
	Hunting, Fishing, Nature, Traditions	0	-1
	Workers' Struggle	0	-1

The left retains control of this region. Sapin replaces the retiring incumbent Alain Rafesthain.

=== Champagne-Ardenne ===
Candidate	Party	Votes (Round One)	% (Round One)	Votes (Round Two)	% (Round Two)
Jean-Paul Bachy	PS-PCF-PRG-Verts-MRC	141,099	27.94%	228,569	41.88%
Jean-Claude Etienne (incumbent)	UMP-MPF	134,640	26.66%	217,424	39.84%
Bruno Subtil	FN	99,592	19.72%	99,728	18.27%
Charles de Courson	UDF	56,110	11.11%	–	–
Marie-Angèle Klaine	Verts	37,937	7.51%	–	–
Thomas Rose	LCR/LO	25,247	5.00%	–	–
Jacques Gaillard	MNR	10,360	2.05%	–	–
Total		504,985	100.00%	545,721	100.00%

==== Regional Council ====
Party		seats	change +/-
•	Socialist Party	21	+8
	Union for a Popular Movement	9	-1
•	French Communist Party	6	+3
	National Front	6	-3
	Union for French Democracy	6	-4
•	Left Radical Party	1	+1
	Hunting, Fishing, Nature, Traditions	0	-1
	Workers' Struggle	0	-1
	The Greens	0	-1
	Ecologist	0	-1

The left captures usually conservative Champagne-Ardenne.

=== Corsica ===
Candidate	Party	Votes (Round One)	% (Round One)	Votes (Round Two)	% (Round Two)
Camille de Rocca Serra	UMP	20,155	14.59%	35,628	25.05%
Émile Zuccarelli	PRG	17,906	12.96%	26,434	18.59%
Edmond Simeoni	Chjama Naziunale-PNC-ANC	16,772	12.14%	24,652	17.34%
Paul Giacobbi	PRG dissidents	14,477	10.48%	21,562	15.16%
Dominique Bucchini	PCF	9,147	6.62%	11,811	8.31%
José Rossi (incumbent)	UMP dissidents	8,804	6.37%	11,094	7.8%
Simon Renucci	Corse Social-Démocrate	8,018	5.8%	11,025	7.75%
Olivier Martinelli	FN	6,181	4.47%	–	–
Toussaint Luciani	Left-wing regionalists	6,055	4.38%	–	–
Pierre-Philippe Ceccaldi	Right-wing regionalists	5,637	4.08%	–	–
Jérôme Polverini	UMP dissidents	4,568	3.31%	–	–
Jean-Louis Albertini	DVD	4,429	3.21%	–	–
Jean-Louis Luciani	DVG	3,860	2.79%	–	–
Paul-Félix Benedetti	Regionalists	3,021	2.19%	–	–
Jean-Luc Chiappini	Regionalists	2,612	1.89%	–	–
J.Marc Ciabrini	PS	2,541	1.84%	–	–
Marie-Louis Ottavi	UDF	2,109	1.53%	–	–
Vincent Carlotti	PS dissidents	1,097	0.79%	–	–
Serge Vandepoorte	Far-Left regionalists	800	0.58%	–	–
Total		138,189	100.00%	142,206	100.00%

==== Regional Council ====
Party		seats	change +/-
	Left	24	+5
•	Union for a Popular Movement and Right	19	-5
	Nationalists	8	–

Conservative Corsica is the right's only success apart from Alsace.

=== Franche-Comté ===
Candidate	Party	Votes (Round One)	% (Round One)	Votes (Round Two)	% (Round Two)
Raymond Forni	PS-Verts	146,553	31.28%	240,551	46.79%
Jean-François Humbert (incumbent)	UMP	116,354	24.84%	185,761	36.13%
Sophie Montel	FN	87,498	18.68%	87,766	17.07%
Gérard Faivre	UDF	36,029	7.69%	–	–
Jacques Lancon	MEI	26,447	5.65%	–	–
Christian Driano	LCR/LO	22,059	4.71%	–	–
Evelyne Ternant	PCF-PRG-MRC	19,577	4.18%	–	–
Marie-France Ligney	MNR	6,914	1.48%	–	–
Hervée de Lafond	Miscellaneous	5,884	1.25%	–	–
Jean-Philippe Allenbach	PF	1,154	0.25%	–	–
Total		468,469	100.00%	514,078	100.00%

==== Regional Council ====
Party		seats	change +/-
•	Socialist Party	16	+8
	Union for a Popular Movement	12	+4
•	The Greens	6	+3
	National Front	5	-4
•	Miscellaneous Left	3	+2
•	Association for a Republican Left	1	+1
	Union for French Democracy	0	-8
	Citizen and Republican Movement	0	-3
	Hunting, Fishing, Nature, Traditions	0	-1
	French Communist Party	0	-1
	Coalition for a Progressive Alternative	0	-1

The left retakes Franche-Comté.

=== Île-de-France ===
Candidate	Party	Votes (Round One)	% (Round One)	Votes (Round Two)	% (Round Two)
Jean-Paul Huchon (incumbent)	PS-MRC-PRG-Verts	1,170,453	31.95%	1,923,139	49.16%
Jean-François Copé	UMP-MPF-CNIP-FRS	908,265	24.79%	1,592,988	40.72%
Marine Le Pen	FN	448,983	12.26%	395,516	10.11%
André Santini	UDF-CAP21	590,542	16.12%	–	–
Marie-George Buffet	PCF-Association for a Republican Left	263,915	7.20%	–	–
Arlette Laguiller	LO/LCR	146,153	3.99%	–	–
Carine Pelegrin	GE-PF-Others	91,875	2.51%	–	–
Nicolas Bay	MNR	43,171	1.18%	–	–
Total		3,663,357	100.00%	3,911,643	100.00%

==== Regional Council ====
Party		seats	change +/-
•	Socialist Party	65	+22
	Union for a Popular Movement	40	-2
•	The Greens	28	+14
	Union for French Democracy	22	-8
•	French Communist Party	19	-4
	National Front	15	-21
•	Citizen and Republican Movement	7	+3
•	Miscellaneous Left	6	+6
•	Left Radical Party	5	+3
	Miscellaneous Right	1	-7
	Citizenship, Action, Participation for the 21st Century	1	+1
	Other Ecologist	1	+1
	Workers' Struggle	0	-3
	Movement for France	0	-3
	Ecology Generation	0	-1

The left retains control of Île-de-France, the region surrounding Paris and gets a comfortable majority. Huchon previously could not rely on a majority.

=== Languedoc-Roussillon ===
Candidate	Party	Votes (Round One)	% (Round One)	Votes (Round Two)	% (Round Two)
Georges Frêche	PS-MRC-PRG-Verts	387,214	36.32%	578,785	51.22%
Jacques Blanc (incumbent)	UMP	258,287	24.23%	258,287	33.10%
Alain Jamet	FN	183,031	17.17%	177,074	15.67%
Marc Dufour	UDF	60,822	5.71%	–	–
Alain Esclope	CPNT	53,317	5.00%	–	–
Georges Fandos	CAP21	51,089	4.79%	–	–
David Hermet	LO/LCR	50,065	4.70%	–	–
Christian Lacour	Regionalists (Far-Left)	13,538	1.27%	–	–
Elisabeth Pascal	MNR	8,627	0.81%	–	–
Total		1,065,990	100.00%	1,129,911	100.00%

==== Regional Council ====
Party		seats	change +/-
•	Socialist Party	23	+4
	Union for a Popular Movement	12	+1
•	French Communist Party	9	–
	National Front	8	-5
•	The Greens	7	+7
	Miscellaneous Right	4	+3
•	Left Radical Party	3	+1
•	Citizen and Republican Movement	1	–
	Union for French Democracy	0	-10
	Hunting, Fishing, Nature, Traditions	0	-1

The left re-establishes its usual dominance of Languedoc-Roussillon.

=== Limousin ===
Candidate	Party	Votes (Round One)	% (Round One)	Votes (Round Two)	% (Round Two)
Jean-Paul Denanot	PS-PCF-PRG	140,217	41.14%	215,624	62.02%
Raymond Archer	UMP	79,531	23.33%	132,049	37.98%
Patricia Gibeau	FN	31,736	9.31%	–	–
Jean-Claude Deschamps	UDF	28,169	8.26%	–	–
Stéphane Lajaumont	LO/LCR	22,529	6.61%	–	–
Jean-Bernard Damiens	Verts-Partit Occitan	20,531	6.02%	–	–
Jean-Louis Hironde	CPNT	18,133	5.32%	–	–
Total		340,846	100.00%	347,673	100.00%

==== Regional Council ====
Party		seats	change +/-
•	Socialist Party	19	+4
	Union for a Popular Movement	10	–
•	French Communist Party	6	+1
•	The Greens	4	+2
	Union for French Democracy	2	-2
•	Coalition for a Progressive Alternative	2	–
	National Front	0	-3
	Hunting, Fishing, Nature, Traditions	0	-1

The left retains control of Limousin, with Denanot succeeding the retiring incumbent Robert Savy.

=== Lorraine ===
Candidate	Party	Votes (Round One)	% (Round One)	Votes (Round Two)	% (Round Two)
Jean-Pierre Masseret	PS-PCF-Verts	253,626	29.22%	457,367	48.51%
Gérard Longuet (incumbent)	UMP	192,157	22.14%	322,558	34.21%
Thierry Gourlot	FN	152,660	17.59%	162,820	17.27%
Nathalie Griesbeck	UDF	75,609	8.71%	–	–
Jean-Louis Masson	UMP diss-MPF	58,080	6.69%	–	–
Christiane Nimsgern	LO/LCR	40,688	4.69%	–	–
Daniel Delrez	PRG-MRC	40,684	4.69%	–	–
Eric Lemaitre	MEI	37,244	4.29%	–	–
Annick Martin	MNR	17,344	1.98%	–	–
Total		868,092	100.00%	942,745	100.00%

==== Regional Council ====
Party		seats	change +/-
•	Socialist Party	30	+11
	Union for a Popular Movement	14	-5
	National Front	9	-4
•	French Communist Party	6	+2
•	The Greens	6	+5
•	Left Radical Party	3	+2
	Union for French Democracy	3	-9
	Miscellaneous Right	1	–
	Rally for France	1	–
	Workers' Struggle	0	-2
	Hunting, Fishing, Nature, Traditions	0	-1

The left captures Lorraine.

=== Midi-Pyrénées ===
Candidate	Party	Votes (Round One)	% (Round One)	Votes (Round Two)	% (Round Two)
Martin Malvy (incumbent)	PS-PCF-PRG	497,714	41.39%	712,233	57.50%
Jacques Godfrain	UMP-CNIP-FRS	228,449	19.00%	376,915	30.43%
Louis Aliot	FN	141,598	11.78%	149,417	12.06%
Michel Valdiguié	UDF-CAP21-MPF	122,033	10.15%	–	–
Jean-Pierre Bataille	Verts-Partit Occitan-Alternatifs	96,983	8.07%	–	–
Lucien Sanchez	LO/LCR	58,662	4.88%	–	–
Christiane Autigeon	CPNT	57,053	4.74%	–	–
Total		1,202,492	100.00%	1,238,565	100.00%

==== Regional Council ====
Party		seats	change +/-
•	Socialist Party	43	+22
	Union for a Popular Movement	14	-1
•	Left Radical Party	10	+1
•	French Communist Party	9	–
	National Front	8	–
	Union for French Democracy	5	-12
	Miscellaneous Right	2	-4
	The Greens	0	-2
	Revolutionary Communist League (France)	0	-2
	Hunting, Fishing, Nature, Traditions	0	-2

The left retains its traditional dominance of Midi-Pyrénées.

=== Nord-Pas-de-Calais ===
Candidate	Party	Votes (Round One)	% (Round One)	Votes (Round Two)	% (Round Two)
Daniel Percheron (incumbent)	PS-PRG	484,798	29.89%	883,885	51.84%
Jean-Paul Delevoye	UMP-CNIP-FRS	280,102	17.27%	484,817	28.43%
Carl Lang	FN	290,908	17.94%	336,434	19.73%
Alain Bocquet	PCF	173,200	10.68%	–	–
Valérie Létard	UDF	129,827	8.01%	–	–
Jean-François Caron	Verts	101,808	6.28%	–	–
Nicole Baudrin	LO/LCR	82,868	5.11%	–	–
Henri Bailleul	MEI	33,230	2.05%	–	–
Georges Hien	buralistes (shopkeepers)	25,433	1.57%	–	–
Yann Phelippeau	MNR	19,551	1.21%	–	–
Jean-Marc Maurice	Right to Hunt	11	0.00%	–	–
Total		1,621,736	100.00%	1,705,136	100.00%

==== Regional Council ====
Party		seats	change +/-
•	Socialist Party	41	+15
•	French Communist Party	18	+6
	National Front	16	-2
	Union for a Popular Movement	16	+3
•	The Greens	9	+1
•	Left Radical Party	2	+1
	Union for French Democracy	5	-9
	Miscellaneous Right	3	-5
•	Citizen and Republican Movement	3	+1
	Workers' Struggle	0	-7
	Hunting, Fishing, Nature, Traditions	0	-2
	Independent Ecological Movement	0	-1

Nord-Pas-de-Calais is also a stronghold of the left.

=== Lower Normandy ===
Candidate	Party	Votes (Round One)	% (Round One)	Votes (Round Two)	% (Round Two)
Philippe Duron	PS-PCF-MRC	143,095	23.91%	297,279	46.22%
René Garrec (incumbent)	UMP-MPF-FRS	172,050	28.74%	257,352	40.01%
Fernand Le Rachinel	FN	83,742	13.99%	88,618	13.78%
Philippe Augier	UDF	55,436	9.26%	–	–
Alain Tourret	PRG-Verts	50,105	8.37%	–	–
Didier Vergy	CPNT	31,376	5.24%	–	–
Christine Coulon	LCR/LO	28,888	4.83%	–	–
Jérémy Folly	Miscellaneous Left-wing	17,586	2.94%	–	–
Etienne Adam	ANPAG-Alternatives (far-left)	16,268	2.72%	–	–
Total		598,546	100.00%	643,249	100.00%

==== Regional Council ====
Party		seats	change +/-
•	Socialist Party	14	+3
	Union for a Popular Movement	11	+1
	National Front	5	-1
•	French Communist Party	4	+1
•	The Greens	3	+2
•	Left Radical Party	3	+1
•	Citizen and Republican Movement	3	+3
	Miscellaneous Right	2	–
•	Miscellaneous Left	1	–
	Union for French Democracy dissident	1	–
	Union for French Democracy	0	-8
	Hunting, Fishing, Nature, Traditions	0	-2
	Movement for France	0	-1

The left had never before won control of Lower Normandy.

=== Upper Normandy ===
Candidate	Party	Votes (Round One)	% (Round One)	Votes (Round Two)	% (Round Two)
Alain Le Vern (incumbent)	PS-PCF-PRG-Verts	281,314	38.86%	408,163	52.69%
Antoine Rufenacht	UMP-MPF	153,089	21.15%	253,480	32.72%
Dominique Chaboche	FN	115,183	15.91%	113,013	14.59%
Hervé Morin	UDF-CAP21	90,505	12.50%	–	–
Christine Poupin	LCR/LO	40,434	5.59%	–	–
Bernard Frau	MEI-GE	30,202	4.17%	–	–
Philippe Foucher-Saillenfest	MNR	13,124	1.81%	–	–
Total		723,851	100.00%	774,656	100.00%

==== Regional Council ====
Party		seats	change +/-
•	Socialist Party	20	+7
•	The Greens	7	+4
•	French Communist Party	7	+2
	Union for a Popular Movement	6	-1
	Union for French Democracy	6	-1
	National Front	6	-4
•	Left Radical Party	2	–
	Miscellaneous Right	1	-3
	Workers' Struggle	0	-2
	Movement for France	0	-1
	Hunting, Fishing, Nature, Traditions	0	-1

The left retained its traditional hold on Upper Normandy.

=== Pays de la Loire ===
Candidate	Party	Votes (Round One)	% (Round One)	Votes (Round Two)	% (Round Two)
Jacques Auxiette	PS-PRG-PCF-Verts	518,475	37.20%	762,618	52.36%
François Fillon	UMP-CNIP-FRS-MPF	450,560	32.33%	693,993	47.64%
Jean Arthuis	UDF-CAP21	169,252	12.14%	–	–
Samuel Maréchal	FN	135,390	9.71%	–	–
Yves Chèere	LO/LCR	84,567	6.07%	–	–
Paul Petitdidier	MNR	35,475	2.55%	–	–
Total		1,393,719	100.00%	1,456,611	100.00%

==== Regional Council ====
Party		seats	change +/-
•	Socialist Party	36	+17
	Union for a Popular Movement	22	+6
•	The Greens	13	+7
•	French Communist Party	8	+3
	Union for French Democracy	6	-15
	Movement for France	4	-1
•	Left Radical Party	2	+1
	Miscellaneous Right	1	-7
•	Association for a Republican Left	1	–
	National Front	0	-7
	Hunting, Fishing, Nature, Traditions	0	-3
	Workers' Struggle	0	-1

The right loses the normally conservative Pays de la Loire region. Fillon was the candidate of the right in succession to the retiring Jean-Luc Harousseau.

=== Picardy ===
Candidate	Party	Votes (Round One)	% (Round One)	Votes (Round Two)	% (Round Two)
Claude Gewerc	PS-PRG-Verts	210,338	27.24%	379,663	45.47%
Gilles de Robien	UDF-UMP-CNIP-FRS-MPF-CAP21	247,425	32.26%	299,518	35.87%
Michel Guiniot	FN	175,940	22.94%	155,858	18.66%
Maxime Gremetz	PCF	83,282	10.86%	–	–
Roland Szpirko	LO/LCR	49,995	6.52%	–	–
Total		766,980	100.00%	835,039	100.00%

==== Regional Council ====
Party		seats	change +/-
•	Socialist Party	20	+7
•	French Communist Party	9	+2
	National Front	8	-3
	Union for a Popular Movement	6	-5
	Union for French Democracy	6	-2
•	The Greens	4	+3
•	Left Radical Party	1	+1
	Miscellaneous Right	3	+3
•	Citizen and Republican Movement	1	–

The left captured the Picardy region, following the retirement of the incumbent, Charles Baur.

=== Poitou-Charentes ===
Candidate	Party	Votes (Round One)	% (Round One)	Votes (Round Two)	% (Round Two)
Ségolène Royal	PS-PRG-PCF-Verts	350,466	46.29%	448,950	55.10%
Élisabeth Morin	UMP-UDF-MPF	249,373	32.93%	294,959	36.20%
Jean-Romée Charbonneau	FN	79,484	10.50%	70,898	8.70%
Gérard Fontenay	CPNT	43,645	5.76%	–	–
Claude Quemar	LO/LCR	34,221	4.52%	–	–
Total		757,189	100.00%	814,807	100.00%

==== Regional Council ====
Party		seats	change +/-
•	Socialist Party	20	+6
	Union for a Popular Movement	8	-2
•	French Communist Party	7	+3
•	The Greens	6	+3
	Miscellaneous Right	6	+3
	National Front	3	-2
•	Left Radical Party	2	+1
•	Miscellaneous Left	2	–
	Union for French Democracy	1	-9
	Hunting, Fishing, Nature, Traditions	0	-2
•	Movement for France	0	-1

Poitou-Charentes, a region where right and left are traditionally equal, falls to the left. It is the home region of Prime Minister Jean-Pierre Raffarin.

=== Provence-Alpes-Côte d'Azur ===
Candidate	Party	Votes (Round One)	% (Round One)	Votes (Round Two)	% (Round Two)
Michel Vauzelle	PS-PRG-PCF-Verts	633,339	35.01%	881,350	45.18%
Renaud Muselier	UMP-UDF-CAP21	472,036	26.09%	659,592	33.81%
Guy Macary	FN	415,171	22.95%	409,786	21.01%
Aline Vidal-Daumas	CPNT	53,782	2.97%	–	–
Alain Vauzelle	MNR	53,251	2.94%	–	–
Patrice Miran	MEI-MHAN-TREFLE	51,543	2.85%	–	–
Samuel Joshua	LO/LCR	48,680	2.69%	–	–
Philippe Sanmarco	Miscellaneous Left-Wing (CC)	28,317	1.57%	–	–
Alain Persia	Union of the Republican Right	19,550	1.08%	–	–
Jean-Marie Mure-Ravaud	Pole of Liberties	19,078	1.05%	–	–
Abel Djerari	Miscellaneous	7,021	0.39%	–	–
Jérôme de Rocquigny	Miscellaneous	7,014	0.39%	–	–
Franck Vidal	Right to Hunt	157	0.01%	–	–
Total		1,808,939	100.00%	1,950,728	100.00%

==== Regional Council ====
Party		seats	change +/-
•	Socialist Party	34	+5
	Union for a Popular Movement	26	+10
•	French Communist Party	19	+6
	National Front	19	-18
•	The Greens	13	+11
	Union for French Democracy	5	-14
•	Left Radical Party	4	+2
•	Miscellaneous Left	2	–
•	Citizen and Republican Movement	1	–
	Miscellaneous Right	0	-2

The left retains control of Provence-Alpes-Côte d'Azur.

Jean-Marie Le Pen, who intended to run in this region, was disqualified because he did not fulfill the legal conditions: he neither lived there, nor was registered as a taxpayer there.

=== Rhône-Alpes ===
Candidate	Party	Votes (Round One)	% (Round One)	Votes (Round Two)	% (Round Two)
Jean-Jack Queyranne	PS-PRG-PCF	688,718	32.19%	1,083,755	46.52%
Anne-Marie Comparini	UDF-UMP-CAP21-FRS	667,856	31.22%	889,815	38.20%
Bruno Gollnisch	FN	389,565	18.21%	355,864	15.28%
Gérard Leras	Verts	215,783	10.09%	–	–
Patrick Bertrand	GRAD-Union of Radical Republicans (U2R)	46,611	2.18%	–	–
Norbert Chetail	MNR	35,310	1.65%	–	–
Roseline Vachetta	LO/LCR	95,524	4.47%	–	–
Total		2,139,367	100.00%	2,329,434	100.00%

==== Regional Council ====
Party		seats	change +/-
•	Socialist Party	45	+14
	Union for a Popular Movement	27	-2
•	The Greens	22	+13
	National Front	18	-17
	Union for French Democracy	18	-11
•	French Communist Party	16	+4
•	Left Radical Party	6	+4
•	Miscellaneous Left	5	-1
•	Citizen and Republican Movement	0	-1
	Movement for France	0	-1
	Miscellaneous Right	0	-1
	Hunting, Fishing, Nature, Traditions	0	-1
	Ligue savoisienne	0	-1

The left captures the usually conservative Rhône-Alpes region.

== See also ==
- Conseil régional
