= Simeone =

Simeone is an Italian surname. Notable people with the surname include:

- Carmelo Simeone (1934–2014), Argentine football player
- Diego Simeone (born 1970), Argentine football manager and former player
- Gianluca Simeone (born 1998), Argentine football player
- Harry Simeone (1911–2005), American musician
- Giovanni Simeone (born 1995), Argentine football player
- Giuliano Simeone (born 2002), Argentine football player
- Lee Jason Simeone (born 1980), English musician
- Osvaldo Simeone, American engineer

== See also ==
- Simeoni
