= 1984 Corsican territorial election =

- August 12, 1984

All 61 seats in the Corsican Assembly 31 seats needed for a majority
- Registered: 203,366
- Turnout: 68.56%
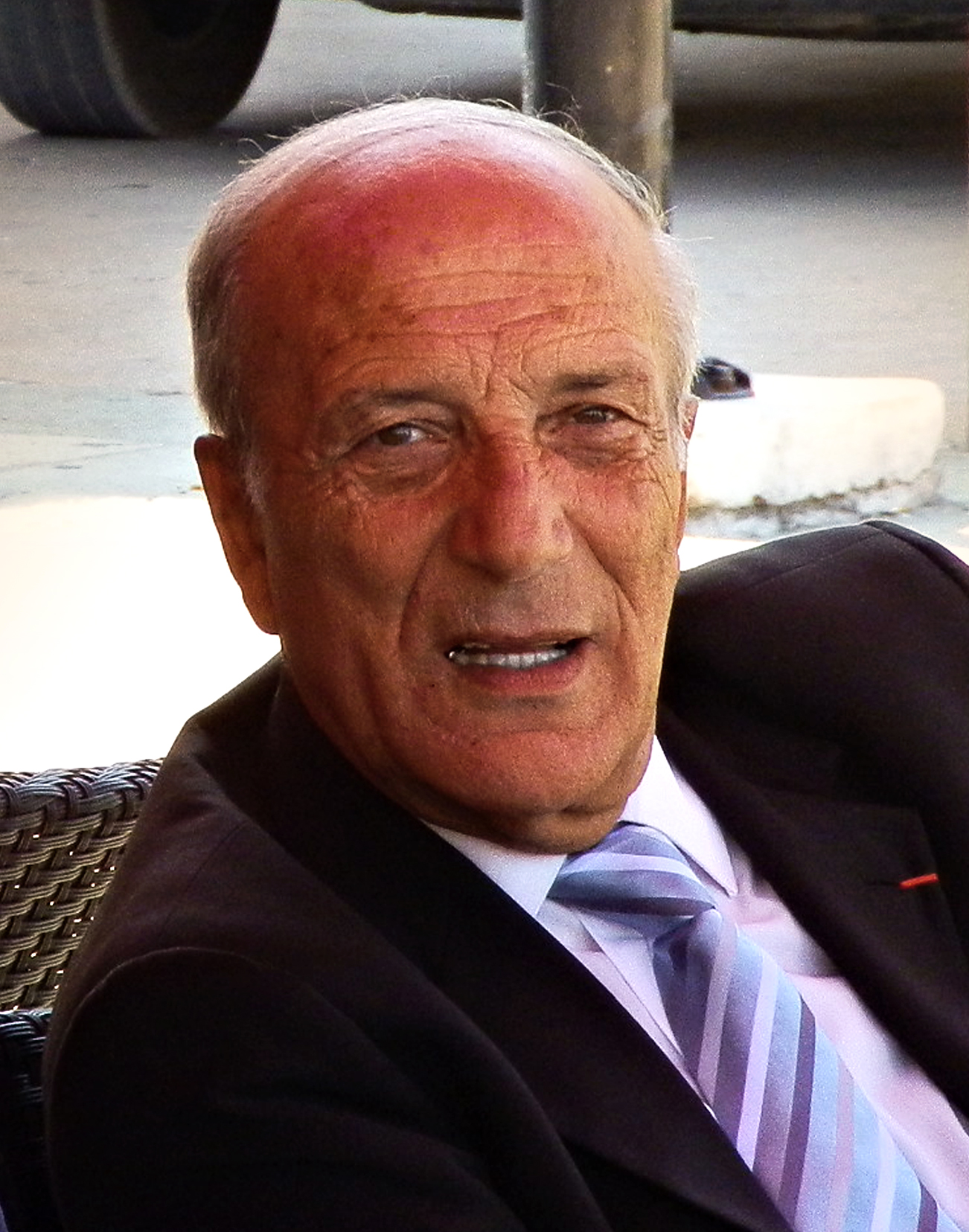

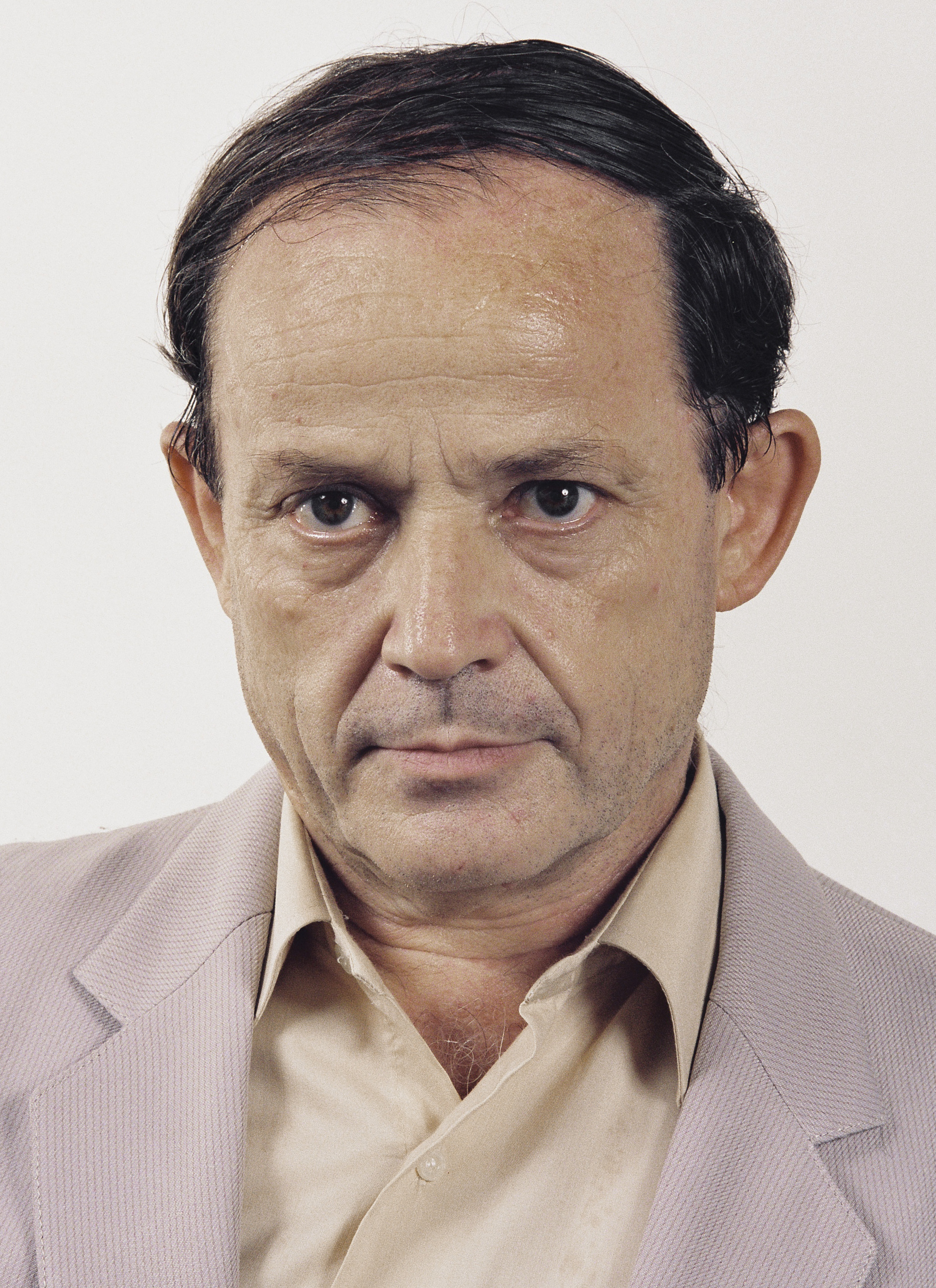
	Majority party	Minority party	Third party
Leader	Dominique Bucchini	Nicolas Alfonsi	François Giacobbi
Party	French Communist Party	Socialist Party-Movement of Radicals of the Left (Corse-du-Sud) Alliance	Movement of Radicals of the Left (Haute-Corse)
Seats before	7	7 (3 Socialist and 4 MRG)	7
Seats won	7	9	9
Seat change	0	▲2	▲2
Percentage	11.73%	13.80%	14.17%
	Fourth party	Fifth party	Sixth party
Leader	Joseph Chiarelli	Jean-Paul de Rocca Serra	Pascal Arrighi
Party	National Centre of Independents and Peasants	Union for French Democracy-Rally for the Republic-Bonapartist Central Committee (Union of the Opposition)	Front National
Seats before	0	19	0
Seats won	5	19	6
Seat change	▲5	0	▲6
Percentage	7.87%	29.17%	9.22%
	Seventh party	Eighth party
Leader	Max Simeoni	Pierre Poggioli
Party	Union of the Corsican People	Muvimentu Corsu per l'Autodeterminazione
Seats before	7	0
Seats won	3	3
Seat change	▼4	▲3
Percentage	5.21%	5.22%

Legislative elections to elect the 61 members of the Corsican Assembly were held on 12 August 1984, two years after the creation and first elections of the legislature. The election followed the dissolution of the Corsican Assembly in June 1984 due to budget disagreements and a chaotic and divisive landscape within the assembly, due largely to the existence of numerous parties with no clear majority to rule.
