= 2024 French legislative election in Corse-du-Sud =

Following the first round of the 2024 French legislative election on 30 June 2024, runoff elections in each constituency where no candidate received a vote share greater than 50 percent were scheduled for 7 July. Candidates permitted to stand in the runoff elections needed to either come in first or second place in the first round or achieve more than 12.5 percent of the votes of the entire electorate (as opposed to 12.5 percent of the vote share due to low turnout).

== Corse-du-Sud ==
=== 1st constituency ===
Candidate	Party or alliance		First round		Second round	
Candidate	Party or alliance		Votes	%	Votes	%
Ariane Quarena	National Rally		10,377	31.20	12,164	36.80
Laurent Marcangeli	Ensemble	Horizons	10,210	30.70	20,893	63.20
Romain Colonna	Regionalists	Femu a Corsica	5,601	16.84		
Marc-Antoine Leroy	New Popular Front	Communist Party	3,125	9.40		
Emmanuelle Dominici	Regionalists	Independent	1,533	4.61		
Lisandru Luciani	Regionalists	Miscellaneous far-right	1,202	3.61		
Jean-François Luciani	Regionalists	Party of the Corsican Nation	1,078	3.24		
Didier Quilichini	Far-left	Lutte Ouvrière	133	0.40		
Total			33,259	100.00	33,057	100.00
Valid votes			33,259	98.29	33,057	95.38
Invalid votes			210	0.62	599	1.73
Blank votes			370	1.09	1,004	2.90
Total votes			33,839	100.00	34,660	100.00
Registered voters/turnout			52,490	64.47	52,487	66.04

=== 2nd constituency ===
Candidate	Party or alliance		First round		Second round	
Candidate	Party or alliance		Votes	%	Votes	%
François Filoni	National Rally		13,620	35.10	16,509	40.79
Paul-André Colombani	Regionalists	Party of the Corsican Nation	10,266	26.45	23,969	59.21
Valérie Bozzi	Miscellaneous right	Independent	6,538	16.85		
Jean-Baptiste Luccioni	New Popular Front	Socialist Party	4,780	12.32		
Jean-Baptiste Cucchi	Regionalists	Independent	2,548	6.57		
Michel Chiocca	Regionalists	Miscellaneous far-right	1,055	2.72		
Total			38,807	100.00	40,478	100.00
Valid votes			38,807	97.95	40,478	96.04
Invalid votes			344	0.87	570	1.35
Blank votes			470	1.19	1,099	2.61
Total votes			39,621	100.00	42,147	100.00
Registered voters/turnout			62,495	63.40	62,503	67.43
