= Departmental Council of Corsica =

Former departmental legislature in France

The Departmental Council of Corsica (French: Conseil départemental de Corse) was the deliberative assembly of the former French department of Corse (1790–1793, 1811–1976), on the island of Corsica.

== History ==
In 1833, when the General Council was created, Corsica had only one department, since the merger of the two departments, Liamone and Golo in 1811. On 1st January 1976, by application of the law of May 15, 1975, it was split into two departments: Haute-Corse and Corse-du-Sud, resulting in the dissolution of the single general council.

== List of presidents ==
The following is a list of presidents of the General Council from 1880 to 1976:

- around 1880: Patrice de Corsi
- 1888-1908: Emmanuel Arène
- 1908-1919: Antoine Gavini
- 1919: Adolphe Landry
- 1920-1921: Vincent de Moro-Giafferi
- 1921-1922: Adolphe Landry
- 1922-1923: Antoine Gavini
- 1923-1924: Adolphe Landry
- 1924-1927: Vincent de Moro-Giafferi
- 1927-1930: Adolphe Landry
- 1930-1931: René-François de Casabianca
- 1931-1937: François Piétri
- 1937-1938: Adolphe Landry
- 1938-1940: Camille de Rocca Serra
- 1945-1951: Paul Giacobbi
- 1951-1953: Jean-Paul de Rocca Serra
- 1953-1956: Jean Augustin Seta
- 1956-1959: Jean Zuccarelli
- 1959-1976: François Giacobbi

== See also ==
- Corsican Assembly, est. 1982, is again since 2018 the only deliberative assembly on the island after merging with the former departmental councils of Corse-du-Sud and Haute-Corse.
