= Corse-du-Sud's 2nd constituency =

Constituency of the National Assembly of France

- Constituency for the National Assembly
- Boundary of Corse-du-Sud's 2nd constituency in Corse-du-Sud

- Location of Corse-du-Sud within France
- Department: Corse-du-Sud
- Region: Corsica
- Population: 75,048 (2013)
- Electorate: 57,877 (2017)

Current constituency
- Deputy: Paul-André Colombani
- Political party: PNC
- Parliamentary group: LT

Corse-du-Sud's 2nd constituency is one of two French legislative constituencies in the department of Corse-du-Sud. It is currently represented by Paul-André Colombani of the Party of the Corsican Nation (PNC).

== Historic representation ==
Legislature	Start of mandate	End of mandate	Deputy	Party
6th	3 April 1978	22 May 1981	Jean-Paul de Rocca Serra	RPR
7th	2 July 1981	1 April 1986	Jean-Paul de Rocca Serra	RPR
8th	2 April 1986	14 May 1988	Proportional representation	
9th	23 June 1988	1 April 1993	Jean-Paul de Rocca Serra	RPR
10th	2 April 1993	21 April 1997	Jean-Paul de Rocca Serra	RPR
11th	12 June 1997	6 April 1998	Jean-Paul de Rocca Serra	RPR
11th	7 April 1998	18 June 2002	Roland Francisci	RPR
12th	19 June 2002	19 June 2007	Camille de Rocca Serra	UMP
13th	20 June 2007	19 June 2012	Camille de Rocca Serra	UMP
14th	20 June 2012	20 June 2017	Camille de Rocca Serra	UMP
15th	21 June 2017	21 June 2022	Paul-André Colombani	PaC
16th	22 June 2022	ongoing	Paul-André Colombani	PNC

== Elections ==
=== 2024 ===
Candidate	Party	Alliance	First round		Second round	
Candidate	Party	Alliance	Votes	%	Votes	%
Paul-André Colombani	PNC	REG	10,266	26.45	23,969	59.21
François Filoni	RN		13,620	35.10	16,509	40.79
Valérie Bozzi	IND	DVD	6,538	16.85		
Jean-Baptiste Luccioni	PS	NPF	4,780	12.32		
Jean-Baptiste Cucchi	IND	REG	2,548	6.57		
Michel Chiocca	REG	Miscellaneous far-right	1,055	2.72		
Valid votes			38,807	97.95	40,478	96.04
Blank votes			470	1.19	1,099	2.61
Null votes			344	0.87	570	1.35
Turnout			39,621	63.40	42,147	67.43
Abstentions			22,874	36.60	20,356	32.57
Registered voters			62,495		62,503	
Result			PNC HOLD			

=== 2022 ===
Legislative Election 2022: Corse-de-Sud's 2nd constituency
Party	Candidate	Votes	%	±%
Party of the Corsican Nation (REG)	Paul-André Colombani	9,549	37.24	+8.14
DVD (Ensemble)	Valérie Bozzi	7,084	27.62	+2.85
RN	François Filoni	3,788	14.77	N/A
REC	Olivier Battistini	1,202	4.69	N/A
PCF	Pierre-Ange Muselli-Colonna	1,104	4.30	+0.38
DVG	Dylan Champeau	1,046	4.08	N/A
DVE	Yves Nicolai	721	2.81	N/A
Others	N/A	1,151	-	−
Turnout		25,645	42.87	−6.14
2nd round result
Party of the Corsican Nation (REG)	Paul-André Colombani	14,746	57.60	+2.38
DVD (Ensemble)	Valérie Bozzi	10,853	42.20	N/A
Turnout		25,599	44.27	−10.79
Party of the Corsican Nation hold				

=== 2017 ===
Candidate	Label	First round		Second round	
Candidate	Label	Votes	%	Votes	%
Camille de Rocca Serra	LR	9,887	36.01	13,491	44.78
Paul-André Colombani	PaC (REG)	7,991	29.10	16,637	55.22
Jean-Charles Orsucci	REM	6,802	24.77		
Dylan Champeau	FI	1,296	4.72		
Nicolas Alaris	PCF	1,077	3.92		
Nadia Soltani	DIV	238	0.87		
Yves Daïen	EXG	168	0.61		
Votes		27,459	100.00	30,128	100.00
Valid votes		27,459	96.79	30,128	94.55
Blank votes		528	1.86	1,105	3.47
Null votes		383	1.35	633	1.99
Turnout		28,370	49.01	31,866	55.06
Abstentions		29,522	50.99	26,011	44.94
Registered voters		57,892		57,877	
Source: Ministry of the Interior

=== 2012 ===
2012 legislative election in Corse-Du-Sud's 2nd constituency
Candidate	Party	First round		Second round	
Candidate	Party	Votes	%	Votes	%
Camille de Rocca Serra	UMP	10,662	33.00%	16,053	52.85%
Jean-Christophe Angelini	EELV	6,860	21.23%	14,121	46.49%
Paul-Marie Bartoli	DVG (CSD–PS–PRG)	5,431	16.81%		
Dominique Bucchini	FG	3,509	10.86%		
Bernard Angelini	FN	3,175	9.83%		
Paul Quastana	CL	2,596	8.04%		
Claudine Rodinson	LO	74	0.23%		
Dominique Tonin		1	0.00%		
Valid votes		32,308	98.68%	30,374	93.94%
Spoilt and null votes		432	1.32%	2,160	6.68%
Votes cast / turnout		32,740	60.99%	32,334	60.24%
Abstentions		20,937	39.01%	21,345	39.76%
Registered voters		53,677	100.00%	53,679	100.00%
