= 1982 Corsican territorial election =

- 8 August 1982

All 61 seats in the Corsican Assembly, 31 needed for a majority
- Turnout: 68.84%
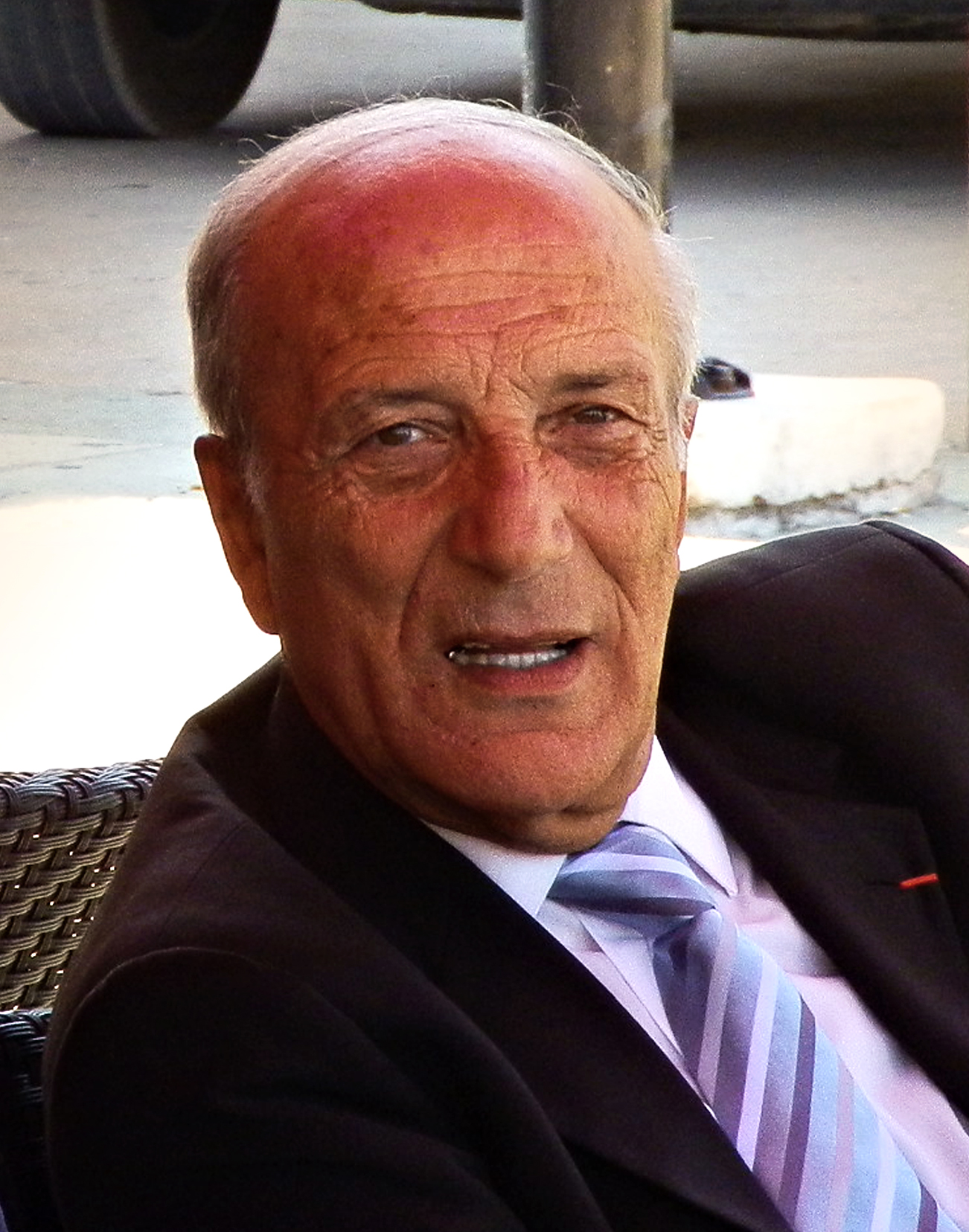

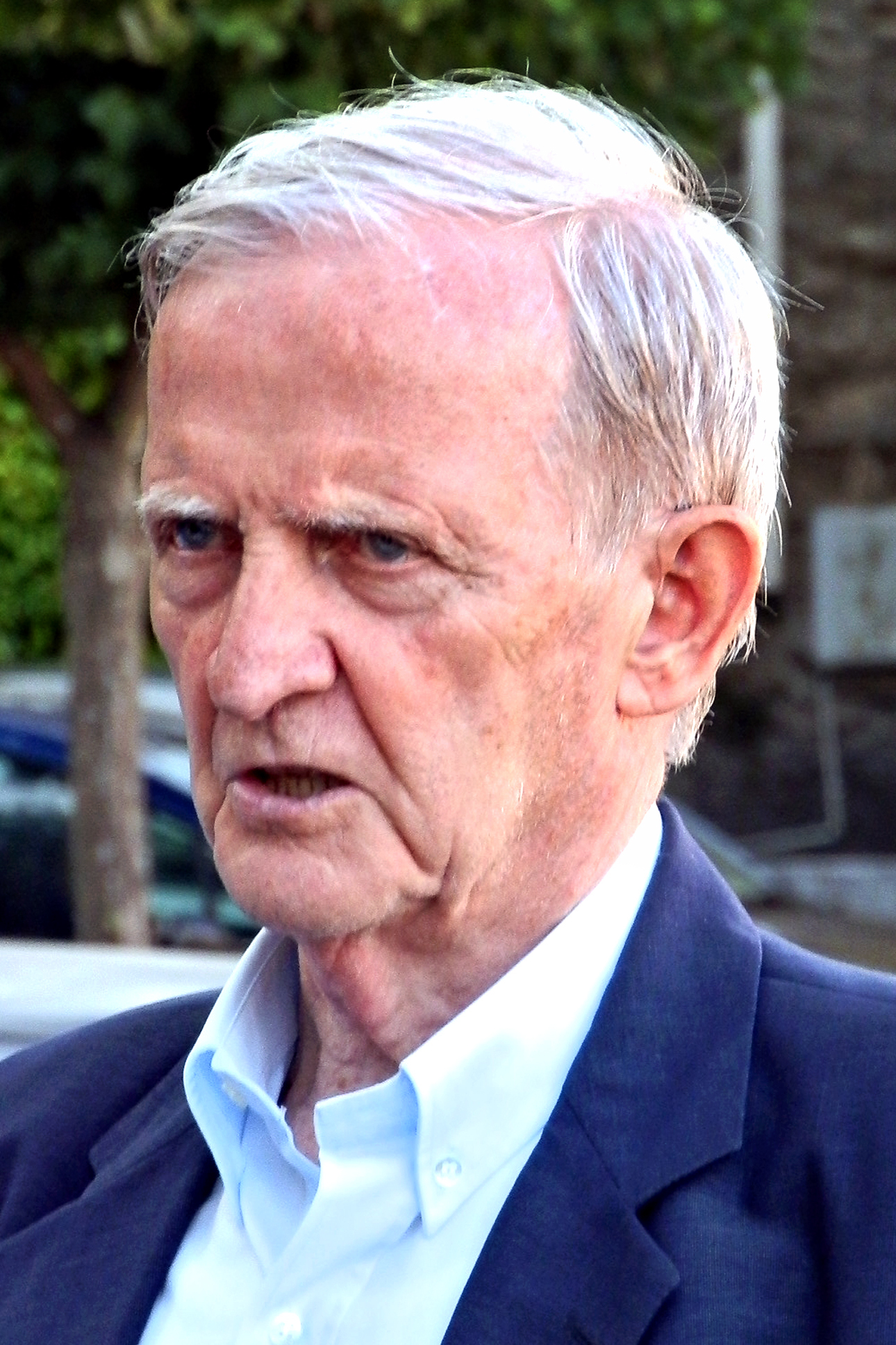
	Majority party	Minority party	Third party
Leader	Dominique Bucchini	Prosper Alfonsi	Edmond Simeoni
Party	French Communist Party	Movement of Radicals of the Left (Prosper Alfonsi Coalition)	Union of the Corsican People
Seats won	7	7	7
Percentage	10.8%	10.3%	10.6%
	Fourth party
Leader	Jean-Paul de Rocca Serra
Party	Union for French Democracy-Rally for the Republic-Bonapartist Central Committee
Seats won	19
Percentage	28.0%
Elected President of the Corsican Assembly
Prosper Alfonsi

The 1982 Corsican territorial elections were held on 8 August 1982, the first elections held for the nascent Corsican Assembly. They were held as the final step to establishing an autonomous government for the island of Corsica, as detailed in the Defferre accords.

The elections were categorised as particularly disorganised, with many lists of candidates: 17 party lists with 61 candidates each, meaning 1,037 people ran for a seat in the assembly. Dissident groups were also common and some were quite large, particularly the Movement of Radicals of the Left, in which the northern and southern branch split into two factions led by Prosper Alfonsi and Nicolas Alfonsi respectively. In the end, 15 of the running parties obtained at least one seat. The elections were also held during a particularly unstable period of the Corsican conflict. The National Liberation Front of Corsica ended their ceasefire and halted negotiations with the Socialist Party and Gaston Defferre just five months before the elections, halting the Defferre process.

== Background ==
The National Liberation Front of Corsica, a Corsican separatist paramilitary which had been carrying out a harsh guerrilla campaign since 1976, called a ceasefire on 3 April 1981 to support François Mitterrand’s bid for election that year. Following Mitterrand’s victory, negotiations between the FLNC and Mitterrand’s government began.

The negotiations focused on a variety of things, from amnesty to the reopening of the University of Corsica to Corsican language rights, but one of the most important topics of discussion was an autonomous government for the island. These discussions laid the framework for the eventual passing of the Defferre Agreements.

The Defferre Agreements moved through the French Parliament quickly, and by mid-March most of the laws regarding it had been passed. This included a law for a special status, or “statut particulier”, for Corsica. This new status also included a regional electoral body, which began to be established as the Corsican Assembly in July 1982 after a series of laws were passed.

The FLNC broke their ceasefire in late March 1982 over the incarceration of a high-ranking FLNC member, Charles Pieri. The Defferre process continued without their participation, largely developing into a civilian project for Corsican autonomy. This would lead the FLNC and nationalist circles to boycott the 1982 elections entirely.

== Campaign ==
Due to the fast-moving nature of the Defferre process, campaigns for the territorial elections were very short and disorganised.

Electoral alliances began to form as regional branches of nationalist parties began to attempt to connect with parties exclusive to the island. The Union for French Democracy and Rally for the Republic quickly formed a right-wing alliance, although minimal amounts of disagreements occurred, and included the regional right-wing monarchist and Bonapartist party, the Bonapartist Central Committee. These three parties would almost solely represent the right in the elections, with the exception of very minor dissident parties.

The left, however, struggled to organize initially. The Movement of Radicals of the Left had difficulties remaining organized, and the group eventually split along northern and southern lines to form two factions of the group. The Socialist Party initially made an alliance with the Corsican regionalist Charles Santoni and his party, the Corsican Movement for Socialism, which he formed in the late 1970s as the Corsican Popular Party, but this fell apart after Santoni and Socialist leadership disagreed over the nature of the Defferre Agreements. The French Communist Party struggled throughout the campaign with dissident movements. Though none of them won any seats, the presence of them likely took away many votes from the PCF.

Corsican separatists boycotted the election under the call of the FLNC, who grew to disdain the Defferre Agreements following their exit from the process. Regionalists, however, still participated in the election. Edmond Simeoni’s Union of the Corsican People began a campaign, and most of the island’s regionalists followed the UPC to the polls. Minor parties like the Party of the Corsican People also ran, but few gained any traction.

== Results ==
Elections were held on 8 August 1982. The following are the results:

Party	Seats
French Communist Party	7
Socialist Party	3
Corsican Party for Socialism	1
Movement of Radicals of the Left (Nicolas Alfonsi)	4
Movement of Radicals of the Left (Prosper Alfonsi)	7
Republican Union for the Defense and Promotion of Corsica	1
Democratic Rally for the Future of Corsica	1
Party of the Corsican People	1
Union of the Corsican People	7
Corsican Rebirth	1
Radical Party	1
Union for French Democracy (Rossi)	5
Union for French Democracy-Rally for the Republic-Bonapartist Central Committee	19
Revival of the Corsican Region	1
Defense of the Interests of Corsica	2
Total	61

== Aftermath ==
Following the election, the councillors elected to the assembly vote for a president to preside over the assembly. To prevent a right-wing president from being elected, the Socialists, Communists, as well as the MRG and UPC formed a loose coalition to elect Prosper Alfonsi as the first assembly president.
