= Paul-André Colombani =

French politician (born 1967)

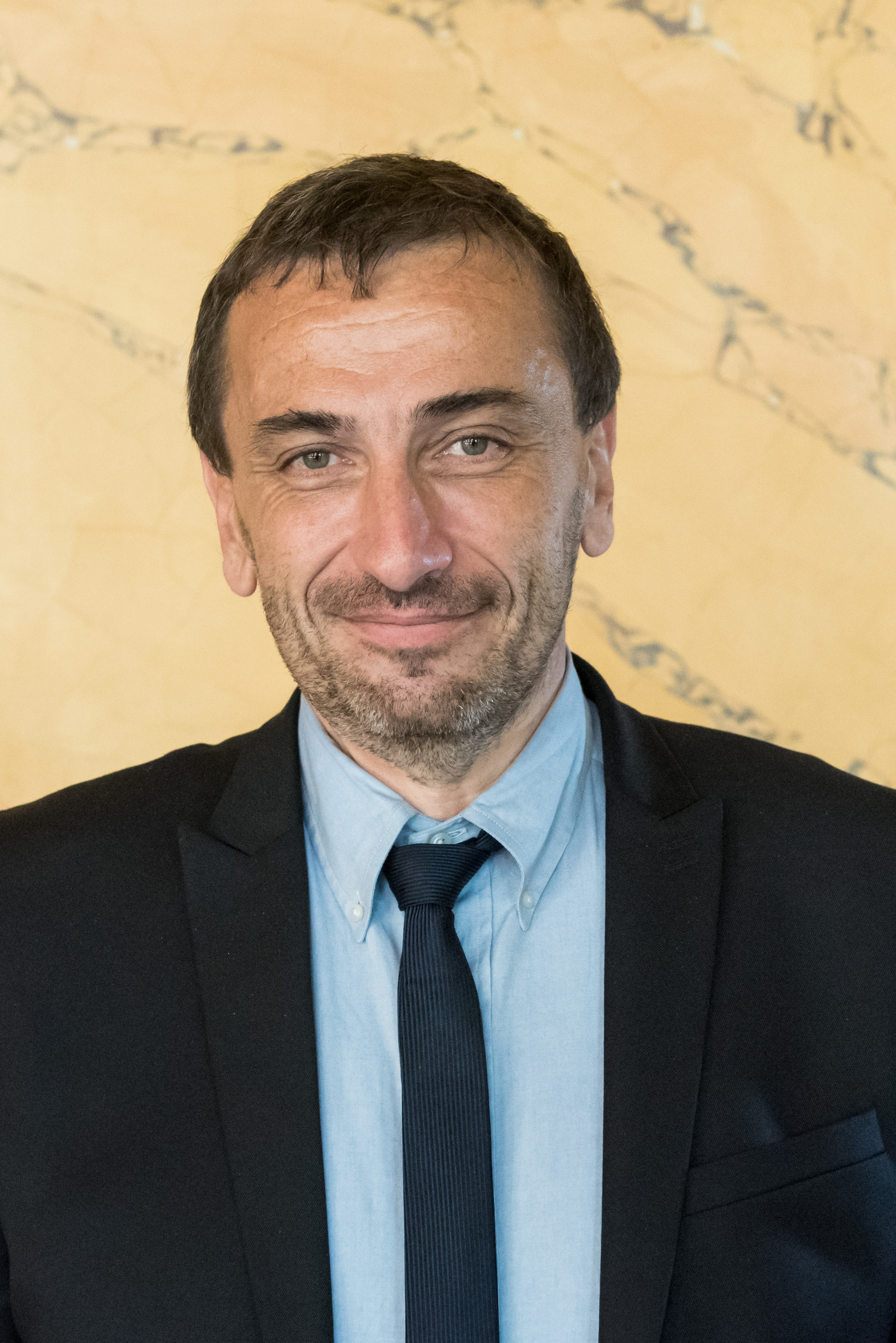
- Paul-André Colombani in 2017

Member of the National Assembly for Corse-du-Sud's 2nd constituency
- Incumbent
- Assumed office 21 June 2017
- Preceded by: Camille de Rocca Serra

Member of the Corsican Assembly
- In office 2015–2018
- President: Jean-Guy Talamoni

Personal details
- Born: 17 August 1967 (age 59) Bastia, France
- Party: Pè a Corsica
- Education: Aix-Marseille University
- Profession: General practitioner

Paul-André Colombani (born 17 August 1967) is a French politician representing Pè a Corsica. He was elected to the French National Assembly on 18 June 2017, representing the 2nd constituency of the department of Corse-du-Sud.

== See also ==
- 2017 French legislative election
