= Jean-François Caron (politician) =

French politician

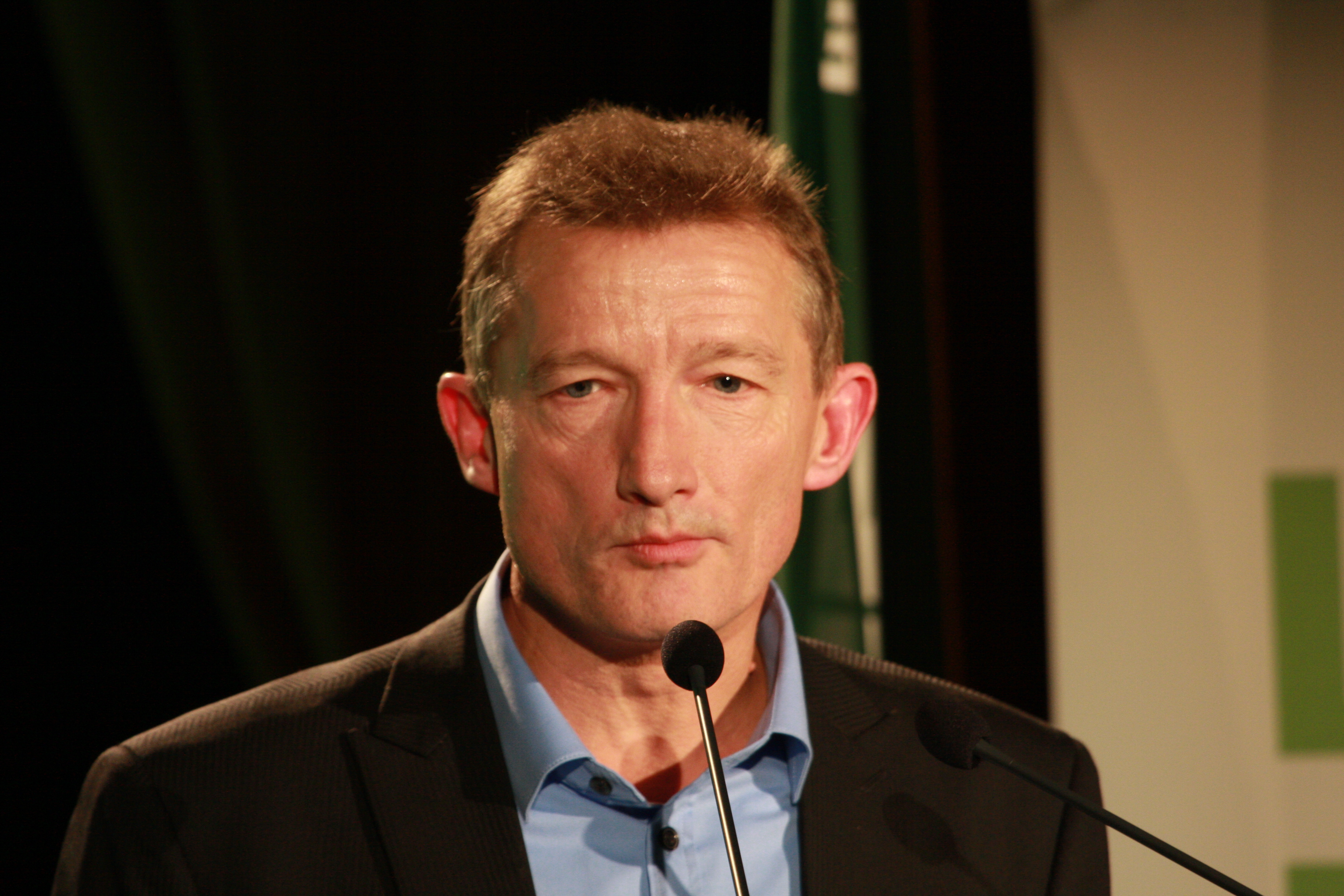
Jean-François Caron

Jean-François Caron (born 21 May 1957 in Loos-en-Gohelle, Pas-de-Calais) is a French politician and a member of Europe Écologie–The Greens. He is Mayor of Loos-en-Gohelle since 2001, re-elected in 2008 with 82.09% of the vote by the first round.

He was originally a member of the left wing of Ecology Generation, close to Noël Mamère and finally joined the Greens in 1997. He was elected regional councillor in Nord-Pas-de-Calais in 1992 and was the Greens' top candidate in the region in the 2004 regional election winning 6.28% of the vote. He is also vice president of the Agglomeration community of Lens - Liévin in charge of environmental affairs.

In 2009, he was selected to be Europe Écologie–The Greens' candidate in Nord-Pas-de-Calais for the 2010 regional elections.
