= Regional Council of Nord-Pas-de-Calais =

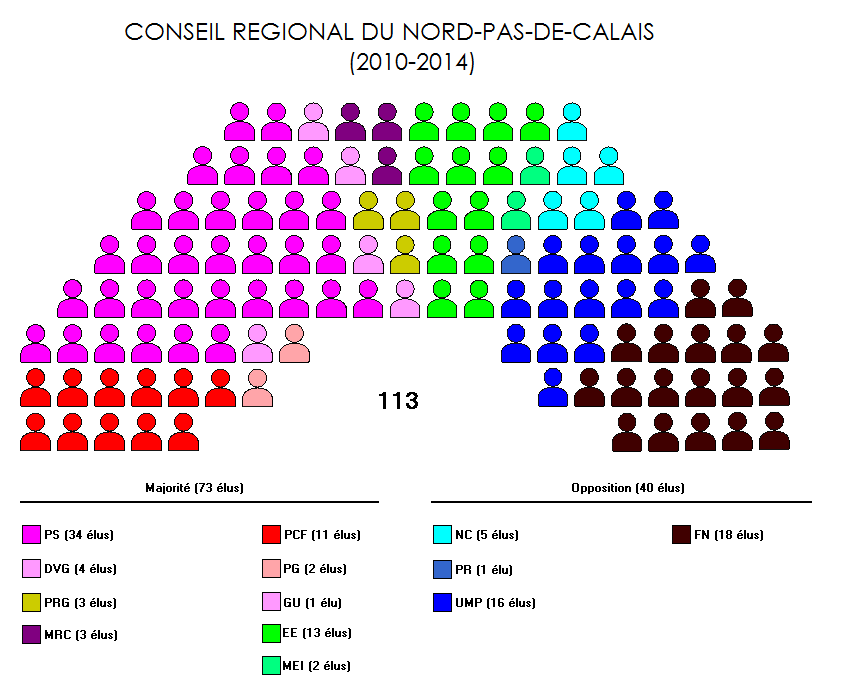
Membership 2010–2014

The Regional Council of Nord-Pas-de-Calais was the deliberative assembly of the former French region Nord-Pas-de-Calais, a decentralized territorial community acting on the regional territory. It sat between 1974 and its disappearance in December 2015 at the Hôtel de Région Nord-Pas-de-Calais, located on avenue du Président-Hoover, in Lille.

It was chaired by April 13, 2001, to 2015 by the socialist Daniel Percheron.
