= Osvaldo Simeone =

Italian information engineer

Osvaldo Simeone is a Professor of Information Engineering at Northeastern University London, where he co-directs the Institute for Intelligent Networked Systems (INSI), and a visiting Professor with the Connectivity section at Aalborg University. He received an M.Sc. degree (with honors) and a Ph.D. degree in information engineering from the Politecnico di Milano, Italy, in 2001 and 2005, respectively. He was previously with King's College London and with the New Jersey Institute of Technology (NJIT) in Newark.

Simeone's research interests include wireless communications, information theory, optimization, and machine learning. Dr. Simeone is a co-recipient of the 2017 JCN Best Paper Award, the 2015 IEEE Communications Society Best Tutorial Paper Award, and of the Best Paper Awards of IEEE SPAWC 2007 and IEEE WRECOM 2007.

Simeone currently serves as an Editor for IEEE Transactions on Information Theory. Dr Simeone is a co-author of a monograph, an edited book published by Cambridge University Press, and more than one hundred research journal papers. He was named a Fellow of the Institute of Electrical and Electronics Engineers (IEEE) in 2016 for his contributions to cooperative cellular systems and cognitive radio networks.
