= Independent Ecological Movement =

French political party

Independent Ecological Movement Mouvement écologiste indépendant
- Leader: Antoine Waechter
- Founded: 1994
- Split from: The Greens
- Headquarters: 26-ter rue Nicolaï; F-75012 Paris
- Ideology: Green liberalism
- Political position: Centre
- National affiliation: Ecologist Rally
- International affiliation: World Ecological Parties
- Colours: Green
- National Assembly: 0 / 577
- Senate: 0 / 343
- European Parliament: 0 / 72
- Seats in Regional Councils: 3 / 1,880

Website
- www.les-ecologistes-mei.org

The Independent Ecological Movement (French: Mouvement écologiste indépendant) is a political party in France founded by Antoine Waechter, former presidential candidate of The Greens in 1994. The MEI hoped to replace the Greens as the major green party, but due to the Green's electoral deals with larger parties, it failed to do so. They claim to be purely ecologist, and neither on the left or right. Waechter failed to win enough endorsements to be a candidate in the 1995 French presidential election. The party ran candidates in the 2004 regional elections and in the 2004 European Parliament election in France and were able to prevent the Greens from gaining more seats, such as in the Eastern EU parliamentary region where the MEI's 3% were enough to prevent the Greens from taking 2 seats there instead of one.

In the 2007 presidential election, Antoine Waechter rallied the centrist Francois Bayrou after failing to be a candidate himself. Before the 2007 general election, the party signed an electoral deal with Ecology Generation, the Greens and CAP21 having refused to join. 133 MEI candidates nationwide ran for the assembly's 577 seats. 84 candidates obtained 1% or more, even with Green opposition. The MEI seems to have become France's second green party.

Despite being favourable to the Europe Écologie coalition, for the 2009 European Parliament election, the party ran as part of the Independent Ecological Alliance which won 3.63% of the vote.

The party continued its participation in the Independent Ecological Alliance during the 2010 regional elections, except notably in Alsace where it participated in a joint Europe Écologie-MEI list, which later merged with the Socialist list. Antoine Waechter was elected regional councillor for the Haut-Rhin and the party received 2 other regional councillors across France.
