= Antoine Waechter =

French politician

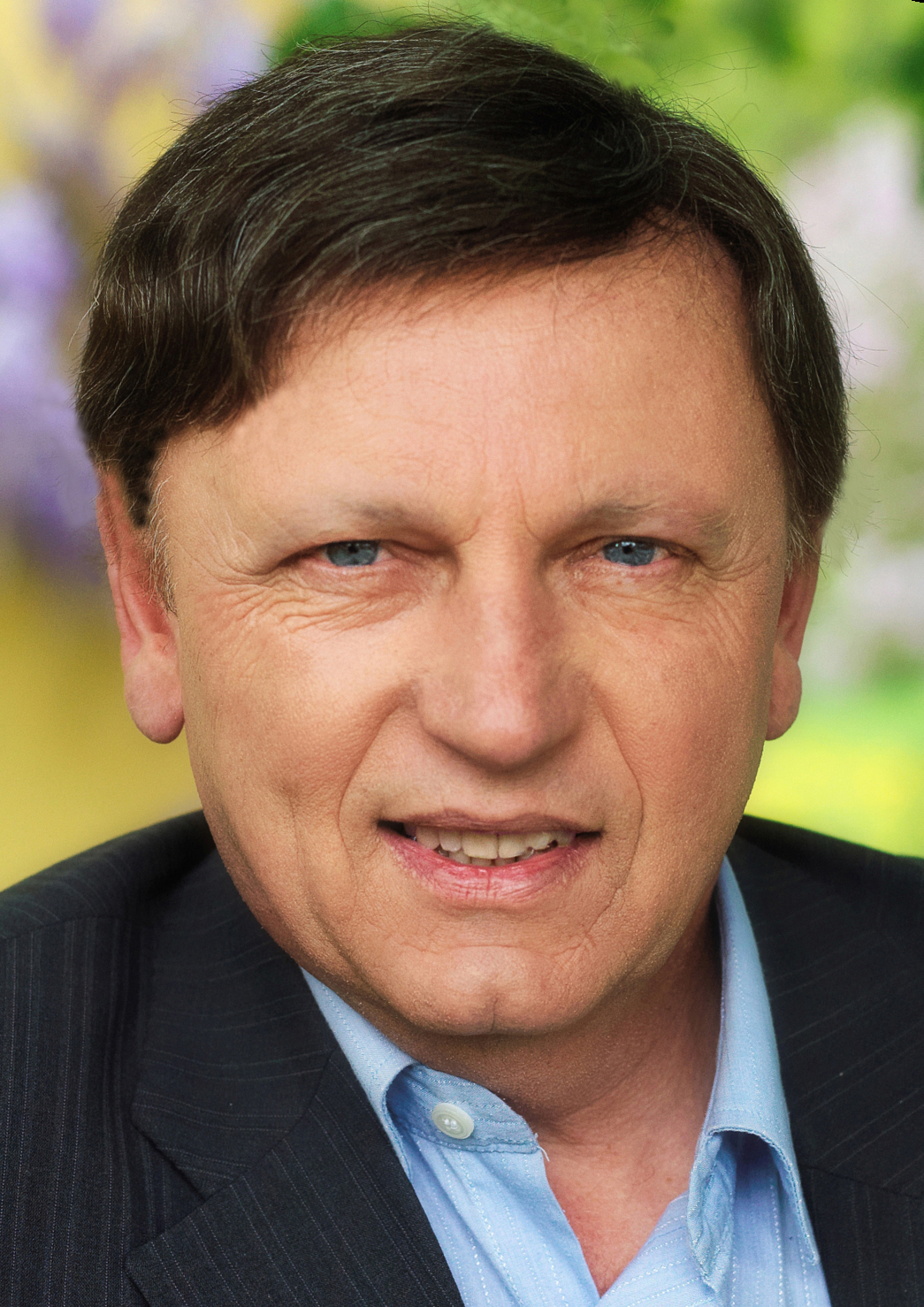
Waechter in April 2009

Antoine Waechter (born 11 February 1949) is a French politician, leader of the Independent Ecological Movement.

== Early activism ==
Antoine Waechter was born on 11 February 1949 in Mulhouse, (Haut-Rhin). He began activism early, and by 1965 had found the Mulhouse chapter of the Young Friends of Animals. His doctoral dissertation at Louis Pasteur University in Strasbourg focused on "ethology and ecology of the Beech Marten." In the late 1960s and 1970s, he fought for the preservation of wildlife and natural areas across France, such as reintroducing beavers in Alsace and arguing against road construction or industrial sites in and around Vanoise National Park. He became regional president and then secretary general of the Alsace Federation within the Regional Association for the Protection of Nature (which was the regional branch of the French Federation of Humane Societies of Nature and Environment, now called France Nature Environment).

== Green politics ==
Joined by Solange Fernex and Henri Jenn in 1973, Waechter participated in the beginnings of one of the first environmental political movements in France: Ecology and Survival (Écologie et Survie). He was also a member of the Ecological Movement founded in after the 1974 presidential candidacy of René Dumont. Beginning with their inception in 1984, Waechter was one of four national spokespeople for the Greens.

Waechter was the face of the l'écologie n'est pas à marier campaign that helped his followers win a majority in the general meeting of the Greens in 1986. This movement within the Greens reaffirmed the strict autonomy as well as ideological and electoral independence following entreaties by the "left of the left" led by Yves Cochet. Because of this intra-party support, Waechter was one of the most influential figures in the Green Party until his departure in 1994. He was also the Green candidate in the presidential election of 1988, receiving 3.78% of the vote in the first round, ranking behind André Lajoinie (French Communist Party) and before Pierre Juquin (splinter of the French Communist Party).

In March 1989 he became a municipal councillor in Mulhouse. At the same time, Waechter's 1988 campaign manager, Jean-Louis Vidal, became the first Green elected in Paris, illustrating the Greens were viable in major cities. Three months later, in June 1989, the list Waechter led for European elections obtained 10.8% of the vote (1,922,945 votes) and 9 seats, the best result ever obtained by the Greens in EP elections until 2009. He then became a Member of the European Parliament (MEP). In March 1992, the Greens and Ecology Generation (led by Brice Lalonde) each obtained about 7% of the vote, and Waechter became a councillor in the Alsace Regional Council.

== Split from the Greens, creation of MEI ==
During the 1993 general meeting of the Greens in Lille, Dominique Voynet, who was the spokesperson of opposition, defeated Waechter for the leadership of the Greens. In Lille and under the leadership of Voynet, the Greens decided to negotiate electoral alliances during the first round of the presidential election exclusively with the Left. It marked the end for the theory of Ni Ni, which argued that the Greens could align themselves with one side or the other depending on the offers made. This change of strategy, and the ensuing tensions within the movement, led to the departure of Waechter from the Greens. He then founded the Independent Ecological Movement (Mouvement Ecologiste Indépendant - MEI) in 1994, which hoped to replace the Greens as the major Green party. However, due to the Green's electoral deals with larger parties, MEI failed to garner more than a few hundred supporters. MEI claimed to be purely ecologist, and neither on the left or right. The next year, Waechter failed to win enough endorsements to be a candidate in the 1995 French presidential election.

After leaving the Greens, Waechter practically disappeared from the French political scene for years. He attempted to be a candidate in every presidential election since 1995, but never obtained the required signatures of elected officials. (The MEI eventually chose author and TV reporter Nicolas Hulot as its candidate in 2007, however Hulot withdrew after five of the 12 candidates in the French Presidential election signed the "Pacte Ecologique", affirming that ecological problems would be the key in all the future decisions concerning every political subject.) By virtue of the sheer number of Green supporters and elected representatives, the Greens have maintained the political visibility MEI has never been able to obtain. During Waechter's participation in the Green's journées d'été in August 2003, the French press openly wondered whether he would rejoin the movement he had left nine years earlier. Later, in 2005, Waechter came out in favor of a yes vote on the Treaty establishing a Constitution for Europe referendum, whereas the majority of MEI voted no in an internal referendum. He replaced his opponents in the National Council, which brought a slew of departures of members and officials, some of whom rejoined the Greens and attended public meetings organized by the right.

Nevertheless, Waechter remained politically visible in the Alsace region, where the MEI list he led in the 2004 regional elections passed the 5% threshold. This showing by MEI was made possible because no list was put forward by the Greens, who had integrated themselves with the Socialist Party list. As for the European elections of 2009, after negotiations with Europe Écologie did not offer Waechter the head of its list in the Centre region, he joined the Independent Ecological Alliance (Alliance écologiste indépendante - AEI), under the movement La France en Action. In the end, AEI earned 3.63% of the votes cast nationally, while Europe Écologie won 16.28%. In November 2009, Waechter announced that MEI would rejoin Europe Écologie in Alsace for the 2010 regional elections. Second on the list in the Haut-Rhin area behind spokeswoman of the Greens Djamila Sonzogni, Waechter was elected in the second round after agreeing to a merger with Socialist Party list.

== Offices ==
- MEP (1989–1991)
- Alsace regional councillor (1986–1989 and 1992–1998)
- Vice President of the Alsace Regional Council (1989–1991 and 1992–1998)
- Mulhouse municipal councillor (1989–1994)
- Fulleren municipal councillor since March 2001
