= Daniel Percheron =

French politician

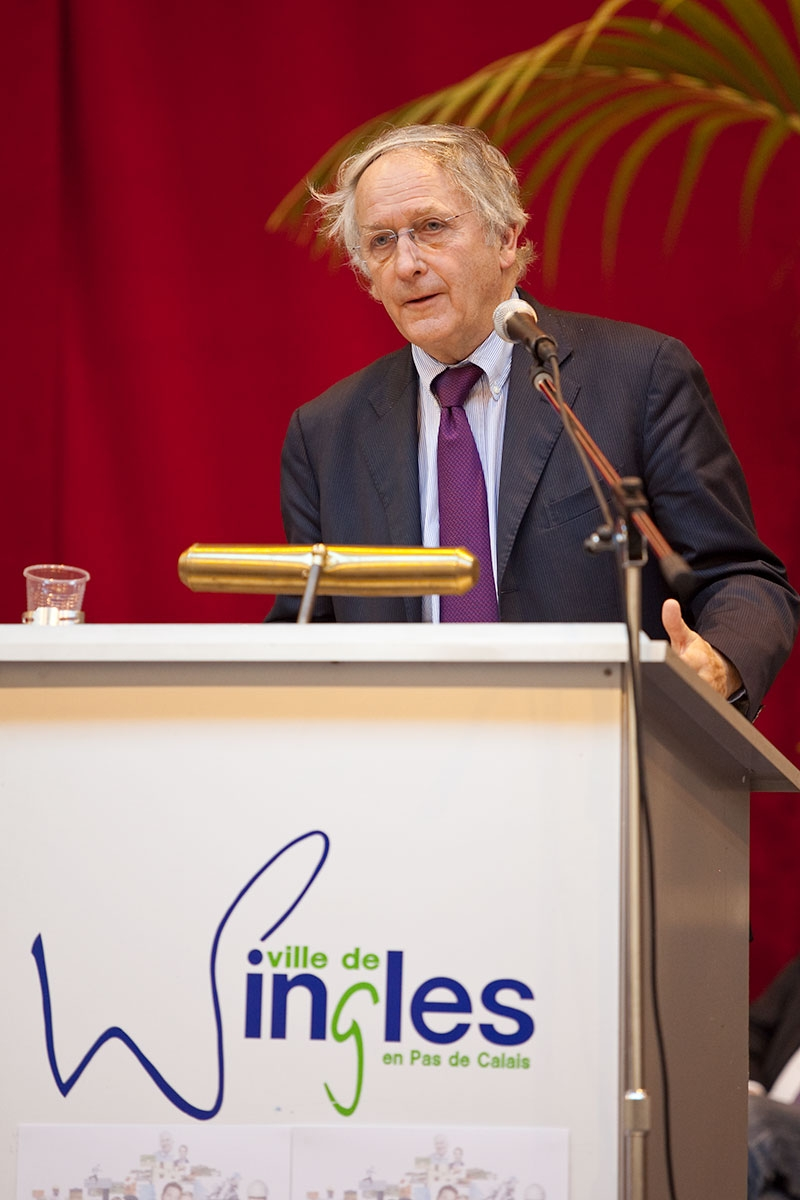

Member of the Senate for Pas-de-Calais
- In office 1983–2017

President of the Regional Council of Nord-Pas-de-Calais
- In office 2001–2015
- Preceded by: Michel Delebarre
- Succeeded by: Xavier Bertrand

Personal details
- Born: 31 August 1942 (age 83) Beauvais, France
- Party: Socialist Party
- Profession: Teacher

Daniel Percheron (French pronunciation: [danjɛl pɛʁʃəʁɔ̃]; born 31 August 1942 in Beauvais, Oise) is a French politician who has served in the Senate of France, representing the Pas-de-Calais department, since 1983. He is a member of the Socialist Party, and was president of the Regional Council of Nord-Pas-de-Calais.
