= Camille de Rocca Serra =

Camille de Rocca Serra (born 21 May 1954 in Porto-Vecchio) was the president of the regional council of Corsica between 2004 and 2010. He was a member of the Union for a Popular Movement (UMP).

== Biography ==
He was first Municipal Councillor of Porto-Vecchio from 1995 to 1997. At the same time, from November 1997 to 2004, he was the mayor of his hometown of Porto-Vecchio. He was also the UMP deputy for Corse-du-Sud's 2nd constituency in the national assembly of France from 2002 to 2017. At the 2007 election, he was re-elected with 51.02% in the first round.

In the regional elections in Corsica, the Union for a Popular Movement ticket with Ange Santini obtained 25.05% of the vote. Thus, he became president of the Corsican Assembly on 1 April 2004, but immediately resigned. This was attributed to after the second round of voting, four left-wing lists were present, which led to Rocca Serra being elected. However, he rejected the win, not wishing the nationalists to be the reason he won the vote since the left-wing vote was split. However, three days later, he won the next round of voting, receiving 30 votes to Émile Zuccarelli's 17, which he accepted.

He once again ran for president of the assembly in the 2010 elections for another term. However, he was defeated by the representative of the Communist Party, Dominique Bucchini, in the third round of voting by 24 votes to 12. The nationalist candidate, Gilles Simeoni, also achieved more votes than Rocca Serra, obtaining 15 of the votes. During the 2016 The Republicans presidential primary he supported the candidacy of former Prime Minister of France François Fillon.
