= Max Simeoni =

French politician (1929–2023)

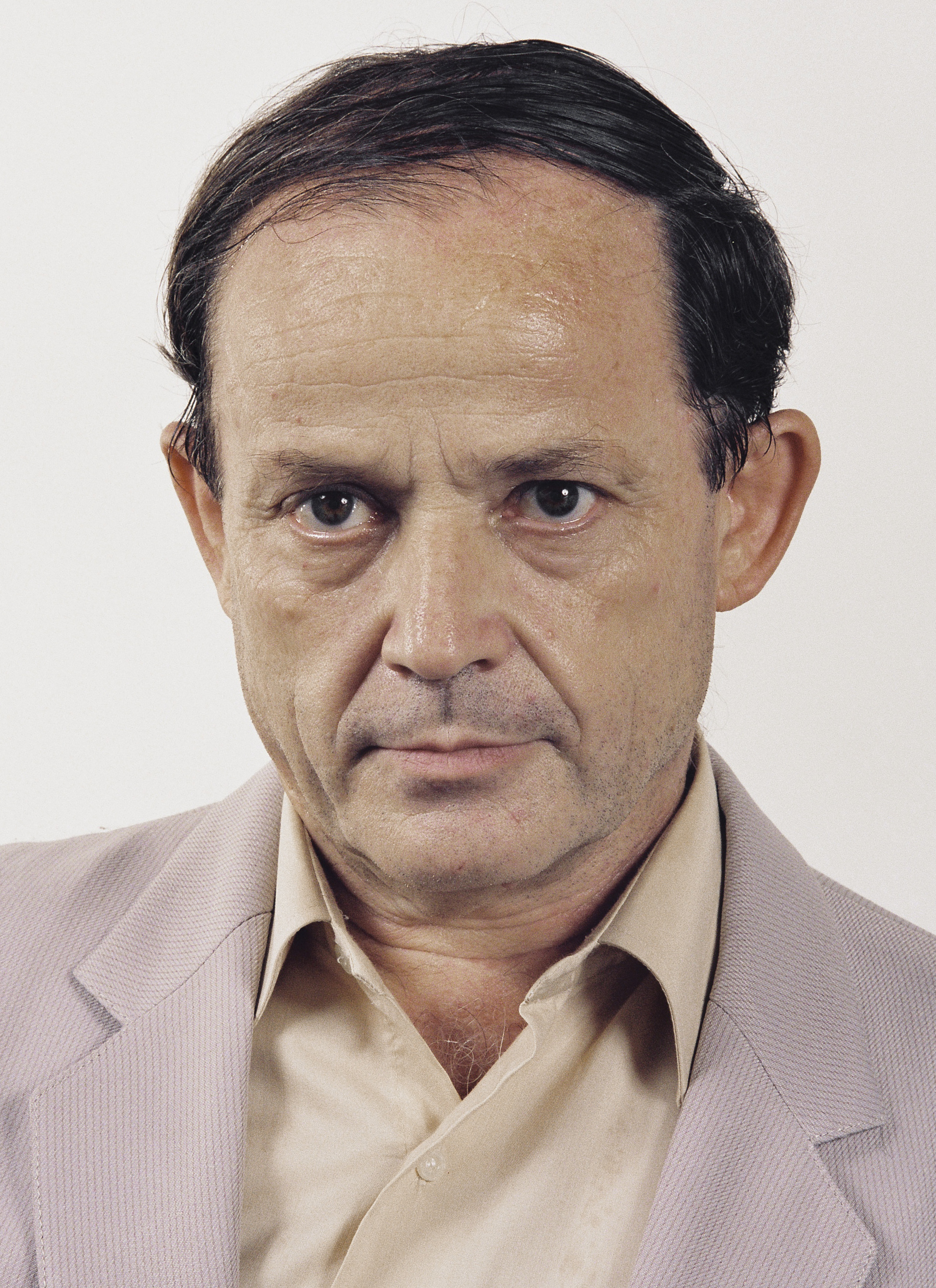

Member of the European Parliament
- In office 1989–1994

Personal details
- Born: 28 August 1929 Lozzi, Corsica, France
- Died: 9 September 2023 (aged 94)
- Party: Union of the Corsican People (1977–2002); Party of the Corsican Nation (2002–20??)

Max Simeoni (28 August 1929 – 9 September 2023) was a French Corsican physician and politician. He was a member of the European Parliament (MEP) from 1989 to 1994.

== Life and career ==
Simeoni was elected to the European Parliament in 1989 as a candidate of the autonomist Union of the Corsican People on the list of the French Greens led by Antoine Waechter. His parliamentary assistant was François Alfonsi, who himself became an MEP in 2009. Like Djida Tazdaït, the other non-Green MEP elected on the list, he refused to abide by the Greens tourniquet rule by which every elected official had to resign at mid-term to prevent the political professionalization. At the next European elections in 1994 he led an autonomist list, Régions et peuples solidaires, which failed to attain the 5% electoral threshold. He later tried unsuccessfully to be a candidate for the 1995 French presidential election. He was the brother of Corsican autonomist leader Edmond Simeoni.

Max Simeoni died on 9 September 2023, at the age of 94.
