= Edmond Simeoni =

French politician

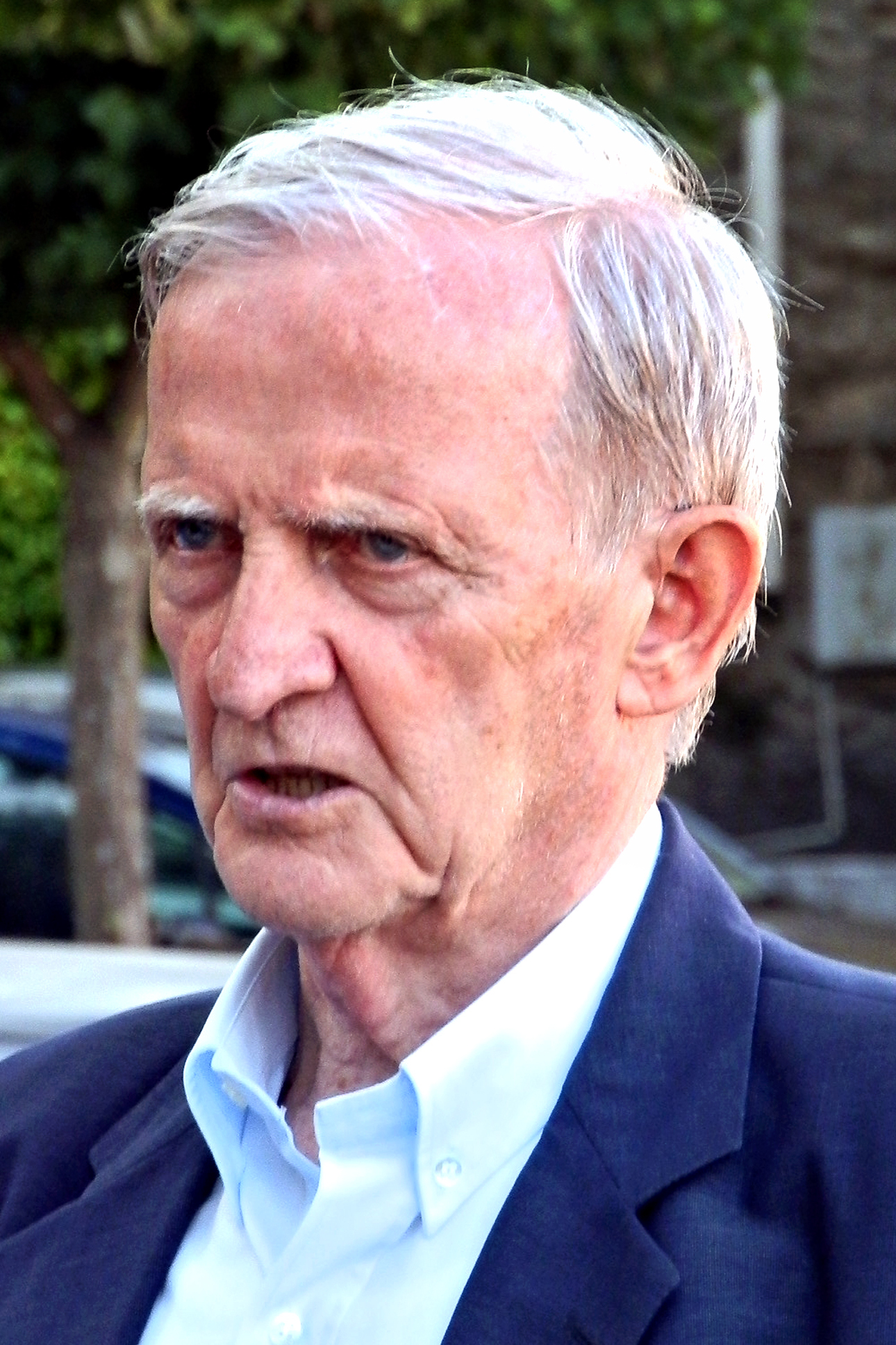

Personal details
- Born: 6 August 1934 Corte, Corsica
- Died: 14 December 2018 (aged 84) Ajaccio, Corsica

Edmond Simeoni (6 August 1934 – 14 December 2018) was a Corsican doctor, politician and nationalist. He was the brother of Max Simeoni, Member of the European Parliament (MEP) from 1989 to 1994 and father of Gilles Simeoni.

Together with his brother Max, Simeoni led the Aleria standoff in 1975, considered a starting point of modern Corsican nationalism.

== Biography ==
Simeoni was born 6 August 1934 in Corte, Corsica. His father was Ferdinand Simeoni, who was the mayor of Lozzi. He grew up in Francardu and graduated from high school in Bastia. He studied medicine in Marseille, specializing in gastroenterology.

Simeoni practiced medicine in Bastia for several years. He died on 14 December 2018 in Ajaccio. Thousands of Corsicans attended his funeral and a tribute that lasted for three days. At the time of his death, he was considered the most prominent Corsican political figure in the past 50 years.

== Activism ==
Edmond and Max Simeoni participated in the elections during the 1960s without much success. They then founded the Corsican Regionalist Action (Action régionaliste corse) in 1967. The organization was banned in 1973 but was revived as Action for a Reborn Corsica (Azzione per a Rinascita Corsa, ARC). Two years later, the Simeoni brothers led a group of 50 ARC militants and occupied a wine cave in Aleria, in protest against the agricultural policies of the French government. Interior Minister Michel Poniatowski responded by sending 2,000 gendarmes to Aleria, leading to a short standoff; the ARC militants surrendered after only a few minutes, but two gendarmes were killed during the assault.

== Books ==
- 1975: Le Piège d’Aleria, édition Lattes
- 1985: La Volonté d’être, éditions Albiana
- 2003: Un combat pour la Corse, éditions Le Cherche Midi – Entretien avec Pierre Dottelonde
- 2008: Lettre aux femmes corses, éditions DCL – stamparia Sammarcelli

== Price ==
- Coppieters 2018
