= Dominique Bucchini =

French politician (1943–2026)

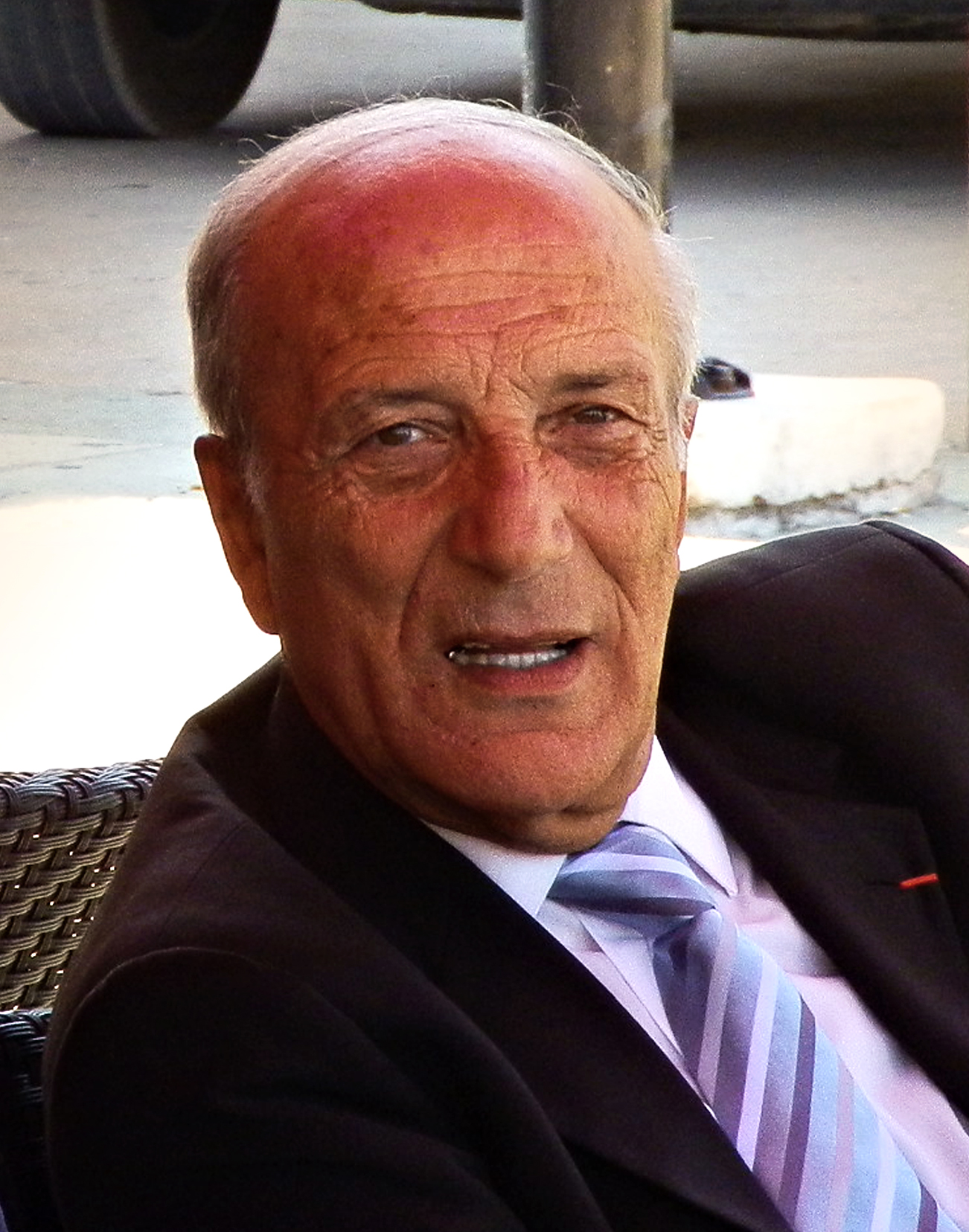
- Bucchini in 2011

Territorial Councilor of the Corsican Assembly
- In office 12 August 1984 – 10 December 2017

President of the Corsican Assembly
- In office 25 March 2010 – 17 December 2015
- Preceded by: Camille de Rocca Serra
- Succeeded by: Jean-Guy Talamoni

Mayor of Sartène
- In office March 1977 – March 2001
- Preceded by: Antoine Benedetti
- Succeeded by: Pierre Gori

General Councilor of Corse-du-Sud
- In office 1988–2001
- Constituency: Canton of Sartène (now part of the Canton of Sartenais-Valinco)

Member of the European Parliament
- In office 28 September 1981 – 23 July 1984

Personal details
- Born: 24 January 1943 Sartène, Italian-occupied France
- Died: 2 January 2026 (aged 82) Sartène, France
- Party: PCF
- Other political affiliations: COM (1981–1984)

Dominique Bucchini (French pronunciation: [dɔminik bukini], 24 January 1943 – 2 January 2026) was a French politician. A member of the French Communist Party (PCF), he was the mayor of Sartène, MEP and president of the Corsican Assembly.

== Life and career ==
Dominique Bucchini was born in Sartène on 24 January 1943. He spent his childhood in Corsica.

Bucchini was a teacher in Vendée in the west of France, then he went in cooperation to Thiès, Senegal as a history-geography teacher until 1971. There he led the football section of the Thiès student club. In 1971, the Senegalese government of the time informed him that he was becoming undesirable. He then left the country to practise his profession first in Montreuil, then at the agricultural school of Sartène. In 1972, he joined the Communist Party.

He was the MEP for the PCF from 28 September 1981 to 23 July 1984. He was then part of the committee on youth, culture, education, information and sports. He was also the mayor of Sartène (from 1977 to 2001) and general councillor of Corse-du-Sud for the canton of Sartène.

In 1996, he was the victim of an assassination attempt because of his positions against the various forms of racketeering.

Bucchini led the list Left Front to the Corsican regional elections of 2010 in which it garnered 10.02% of the votes in the 1st round. He was present in the second round in third position on the list of the union of the left led by Paul Giacobbi. He was elected president of the Corsican Assembly during the third ballot.

Bucchini was married and the father of two children: Julien and Jean-Simon. He died in Sartène on 2 January 2026, at the age of 82.

== Distinction ==
In 2016, Bucchini was elevated to the rank of Officer of the Legion of Honour.
