= 2022 French election =

The 2022 French election may refer to:

- The 2022 French presidential election, 10 and 24 April 2022
- The 2022 French legislative election, 12 and 19 June 2022
