= 2022 French People's Primary =

2022 presidential primary in France

27 January 2022
- Turnout: 84.1%
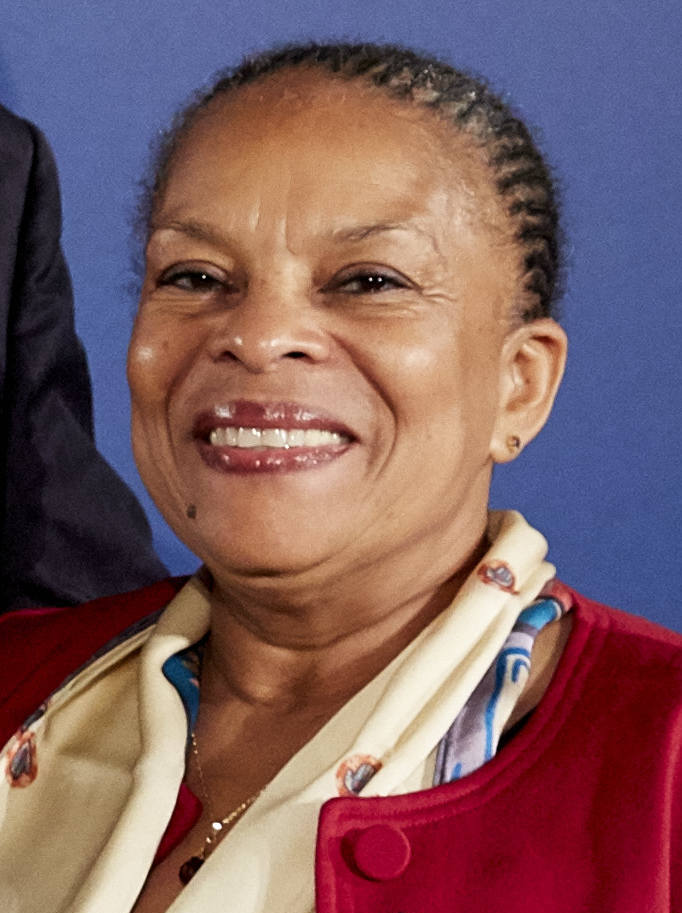

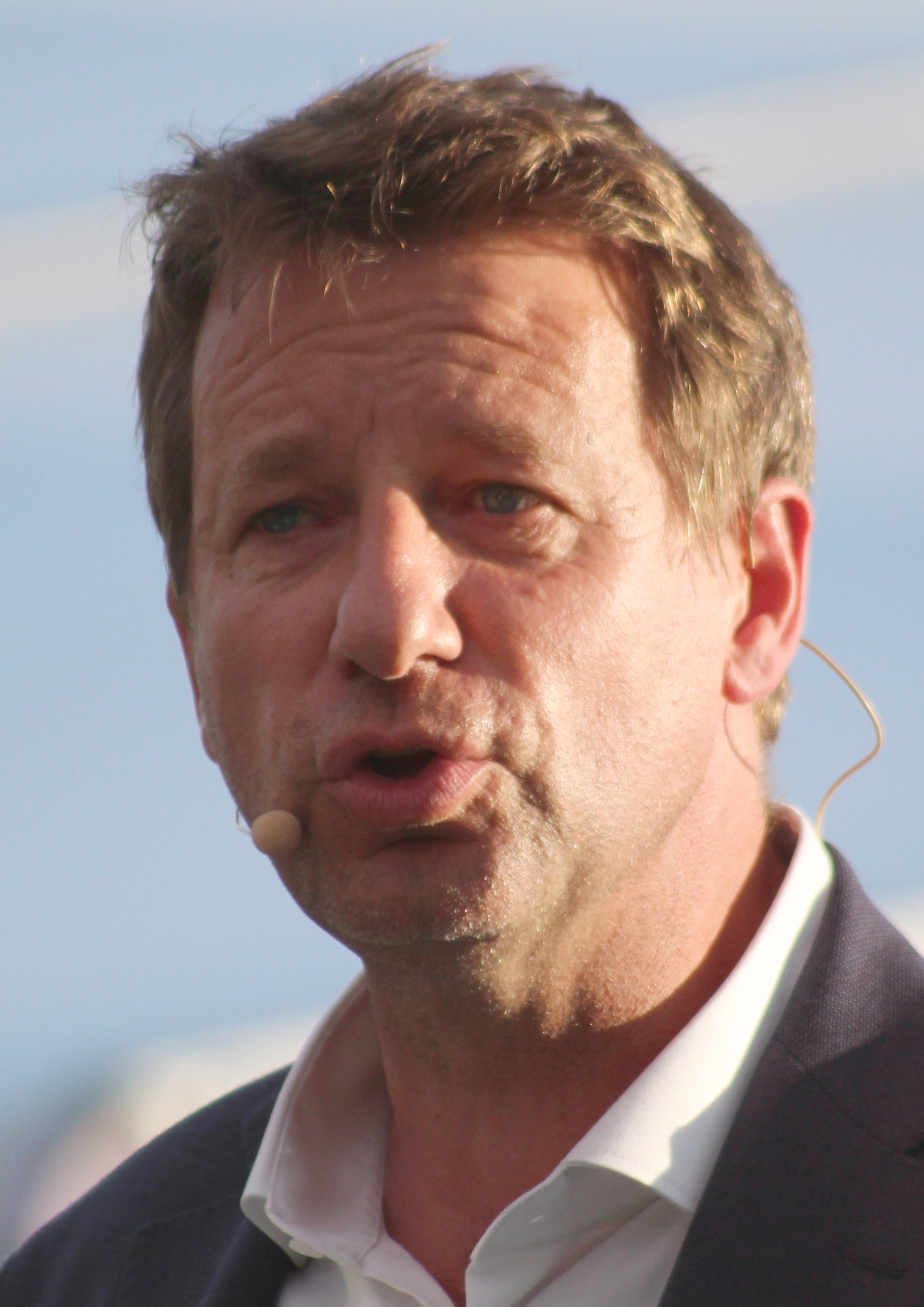

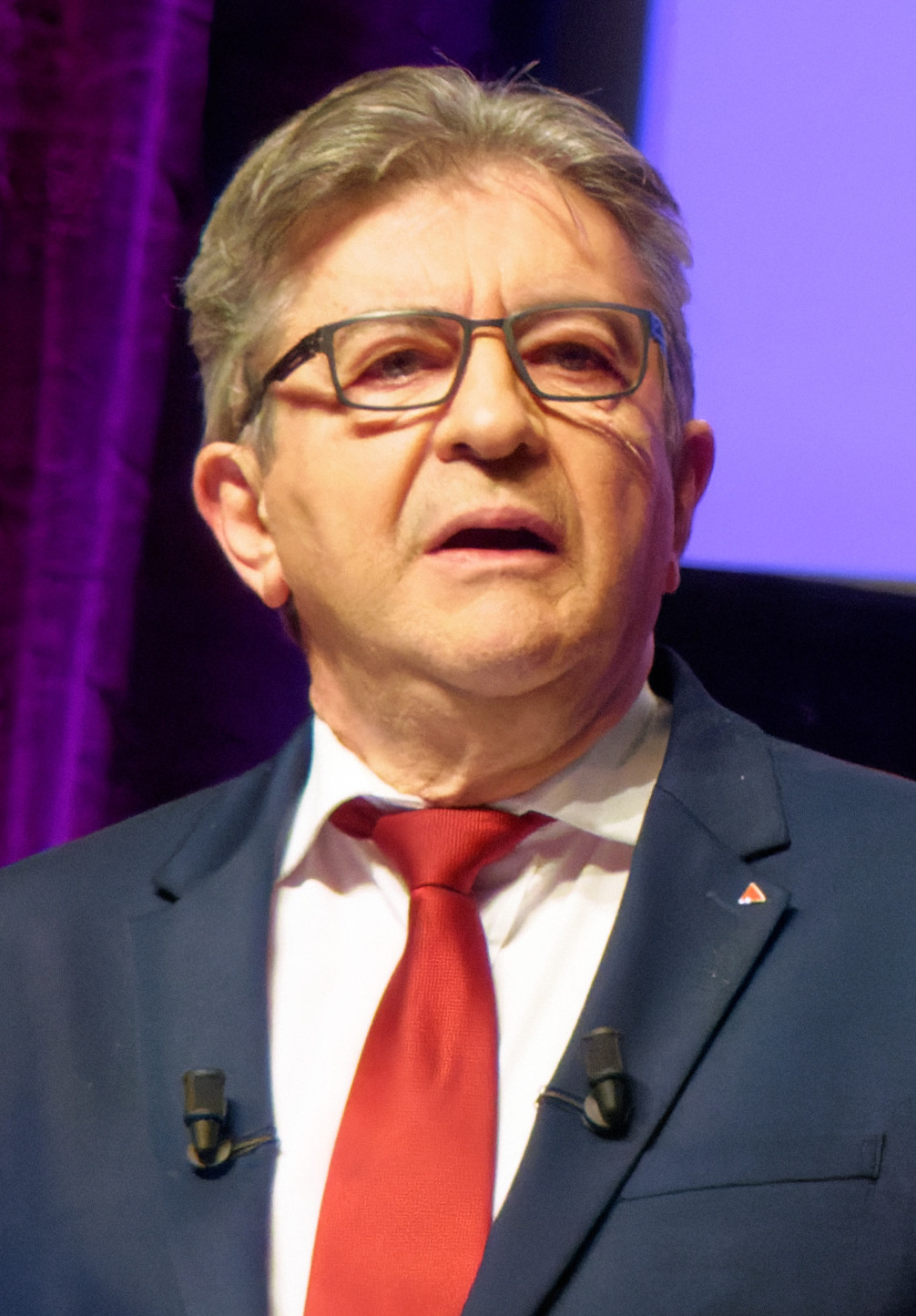
Candidate	Christiane Taubira	Yannick Jadot	Jean-Luc Mélenchon
Party	Walwari	EELV	LFI
Average grade	Good +	Fairly Good +	Fairly Good −

The People's Primary (French: La Primaire Populaire) is a nomination vote launched by independent activists to nominate a common left-wing candidate for the 2022 French presidential election. The process involved two steps. Firstly, an online sponsorship of potential participants was started in July 2021 and completed in October 2021. After this, a vote among seven candidates took place from 27 to 30 January 2022, three of whom declined to participate in the primary. The primary was conducted according to a majority judgment voting system, in which all voters rate all candidates, with the candidate with the highest median rating winning.

Christiane Taubira, the only well-known candidate who was willing to participate, won the primary. Yannick Jadot and Jean-Luc Mélenchon who came in second and third place respectively had not given their consent to be candidates. Taubira subsequently pulled out of the presidential race on 2 March 2022, citing the main reason being that she only achieved 181 of the 500 required sponsorships. After Taubira withdrew from the race, the organizers of the primary announced their support for Mélenchon's campaign, despite finishing in third place by the voters.

== History ==
=== Foundation and structure ===
The initiative for a so-called "people's" primary for the leftists and greens was launched by the collective "Rencontre des justices", formed in October 2020 by "social entrepreneurs" and a range of activists, who wanted to create a "justice bloc". They have described this as a "third way" between an "identity bloc" and a "neoliberal bloc", which covers voters from a wide range of the left, from the more centrist parties to anti-capitalist ones.

The activists hope to use a primary to nominate a single unity candidate who will promote a progressive agenda and provide an alternative to the battle between incumbent President Macron and the extreme right of Marine Le Pen and Éric Zemmour. Their goal was that the candidate bring together a fragmented and divided left, in order to respond to "environmental, social and economic emergencies". They hope that the candidate will gather enough support to reach the second round, after the defeat of the Socialist Party which finished in fifth place in the 2017 presidential election.

A structure called "2022 or never" was responsible for organising the primary, created in February 2021. It is made up of six employees and received 30,000 euros in fundraising.

Local groups were set up to prepare a local base beyond labels.

The primary claims the support of around a hundred major figures, including director Cyril Dion, actors Charles Berling and Juliette Binoche, yellow vest activist Priscillia Ludosky, journalist Marie-Monique Robin and climatologist Jean Jouzel.

Among the first potential candidates interested was MEP Pierre Larrouturou, the former socialist Gérard Filoche, and environmentalist Sandrine Rousseau.

The first step in the process of the primary was the drafting of a common platform made up of "flagship proposals" to which the candidates and voters must adhere.

In May 2021, Samuel Grzybowski, spokesperson for the popular primary, declared to the press that "for several months, each week, a 'council of the parties' has been meeting to agree on a common base", without specifying which parties.

A few months later, it was announced that citizens could sponsor candidates until October, with the vote originally scheduled for taking place in late Autumn. Visitors to the website were given two options: to promote names themselves and to approve one of the existing candidates.

==== Reactions and protests from the major candidates ====
No political party nor any of the major candidates committed themselves to the primary, even if some have not outright opposed it, as they want to keep their candidates. In January, Christiane Taubira was the only one to commit to stepping down in the event of defeat, after having rejected any presidential candidacy in September.

By the time of the primary, the following parties had already nominated their candidates:

- La France Insoumise had already nominated as candidate Jean-Luc Mélenchon, who obtained 19.6% in the previous presidential election.
- The French Communist Party had also already made a nomination of its candidate by its members from 7 to 9 May 2021. Fabien Roussel obtained 82.32% of the vote against 15.70% blank and null votes, 1.82% to Emmanuel Dang Tran and 0.16% to Grégoire Munck, the other two candidates.
- The Socialist Party held its own primary in October 2021, in which 72% of the votes cast went to the Mayor of Paris Anne Hidalgo, against 28% for the other candidate Stéphane Le Foll.
- The Greens collectively organised their own primary in September 2021, open to non-members. 51.03% of the votes in the second round went to Yannick Jadot.

Mélenchon signified his refusal to partake in the primary, as did Jadot. Hidalgo originally was open to the proposal, but backtracked after she won her party's primary.

Taubira ruled out a candidacy in September 2021, but revoked this in December, officially announcing her participation in the Primary on 9 January 2022.

==== The political platform ====
Participation in the primary was based on a common platform of around ten political proposals, which the organizers claim to be inspired by the demands of the latest social movements and compatible with the programs of the parties concerned. No major party came out in favour of this platform.

Presented in early July, the platform contained policies such as scrapping nuclear power by 2050, a thermal renovation plan, a 'solidarity income' from the age of 18, a modernisation of the wealth tax, the introduction of multi-member proportional voting in legislative elections and a reduction in the working week. It did not take a position on certain divisive subjects, such as the European Union.

== Organisation ==
=== Funding ===
The "2022 or never" association finances its employees, auto-entrepreneurs, its trainees and this vote. It declared that it received 730,000 euros in donations and 175,000 euros in loans. There were loans of up to €100,000 by business leaders and three donations of more than €20,000.

==== Election funding ====
One week before the vote and two days before the closing date for registrations, the financing of this election from the technological service providers did not seem assured, forcing the association to raise money.

== Sponsorships ==
The candidate sponsorship process was open from 11 July to 11 October 2021, through an online voting system.

Twelve initial people were proposed by the organizers at the launch of this process:

- Pierre Larrouturou - New Deal
- Sandrine Rousseau - EELV
- Yannick Jadot - EELV
- Éric Piolle - EELV
- Arnaud Montebourg - L'Engagement
- Anne Hidalgo - Socialist Party
- Fabien Roussel - PCF
- François Ruffin
- Jean-Luc Mélenchon - LFI
- Gérard Filoche - GDS
- Christiane Taubira - Walwari
- Gaël Giraud

=== Sponsorships obtained by 11 October ===
After the sponsorship period, the organisers give the names of the five men and five women who collected the most sponsorships. These candidates had also had to have obtained at least 500 sponsorships and be supposedly a member of the 'common base'. There were 132,000 registered sponsorships cast.

- Christiane Taubira - 34,600 sponsorships
- François Ruffin - 26,000 sponsorships
- Pierre Larrouturou - 14,500 sponsorships
- Gaël Giraud - 13,500 sponsorships
- Clémentine Autain - 10,500 sponsorships
- Jean-Luc Mélenchon - 9,500 sponsorships
- Anne Hidalgo - 6,500 sponsorships
- Yannick Jadot - 6,300 sponsorships
- Charlotte Marchandise - 1,700 sponsorships
- Anna Agueb Porterie - 800 sponsorships.

According to an article in Liberation, the PCF candidate Fabien Roussel came 18th out of 21 candidates with 1,944 sponsorships.

Seven candidates were chosen in the end, as Gaël Giraud, François Ruffin and Clémentine Autain all withdrew from the primary.

== Voting procedure ==
The 7 candidates were subject to a single round of voting from 27 to 30 January 2022.

The voting system is a form of majority judgment, where the voter rates the candidates. Voters must give each candidate a grade, out of five possible options: "very good", "good", "fairly good", "acceptable" and "insufficient". The candidate with the best median grade wins the election.

To participate in this final vote, the person must confirm that they recognize themselves in the common base, are of French nationality and are over 16 years old.

== Candidates ==
Candidate (name and age)	Political party	Roles
Anna Agueb-Porterie (24 years old)	Miscellaneous left	Environmental activist, co-founder of the Our house is burning campaign.
Anne Hidalgo (62 years old) refused to participate	Socialist Party	Mayor of Paris since 2014, she announced her candidacy on 12 September 2021 and won the Socialist Party primary on 14 October against Stéphane Le Foll. She is on the ballot in spite of her refusing to recognise the results.
Yannick Jadot (54 years old) refused to participate	Europe Ecology The Greens	Member of the European Parliament since 2009, he narrowly won the presidential primary for ecology in September 2021 against Sandrine Rousseau. He was selected despite his refusal to participate in the primary.
Pierre Larrouturou (57 years old)	New Deal	Founder of the New Deal party, elected in 2019 MEP on a common Socialist list
Charlotte Marchandise (47 years old)	Miscellaneous left	Deputy delegate for health at the city of Rennes until 2020 and nominated candidate for LaPrimaire.org in the 2017 presidential election.
Jean-Luc Mélenchon (70 years old) refused to participate	La France Insoumise	MP for Bouches-du-Rhône and candidate in 2012 and 2017. He was selected despite his refusal to participate in the primary.
Christiane Taubira (69 years old)	Walwari	Minister of Justice from 2012 to 2016, Member of Parliament for Guiana from 1993 to 2012, candidate of the Radical Left Party in the 2002 presidential election.

== Voters ==
There were 466,895 registered. This was more than the other 2021 primaries, including that of the Green Party and the Republicans, but much less than the 2017 Socialist Party primary, which had over 2 million voters. The actual number of registered voters could not be verified due to the system making it impossible to verify the identity of voters. Hence, those with multiple emails could register for a vote multiple times.

== Results ==
Each voter gave every candidate a grade from 'Very Good' to 'Insufficient'. An overall grade was then calculated from this. Christiane Taubira came out on top, winning the primary.

Candidate	Grade					Average Grade
Candidate	Very Good %	Good %	Fairly Good %	Acceptable %	Insufficient %	Average Grade
Christiane Taubira (Walwari)	49.41	18.01	11.68	7.91	12.99	Good +
Yannick Jadot (EÉLV)	21.57	23.11	20.57	15.54	19.21	Fairly Good +
Jean-Luc Mélenchon (LFI)	20.49	15.33	16.73	18.29	29.16	Fairly Good −
Pierre Larrouturou (ND)	13.37	14.53	19.42	18.11	34.58	Acceptable +
Anne Hidalgo (PS)	6.33	13.35	20.70	23.80	35.81	Acceptable +
Charlotte Marchandise (Ind.)	3.41	8.93	19.59	21.87	46.20	Acceptable −
Anna Agueb-Porterie (Ind.)	2.86	7.34	18.19	21.05	50.56	Insufficient
Registered	466,895					–
Turnout	392,738					84.1%

Taubira	Good +
Jadot	Fairly good +
Mélenchon	Fairly good −
Larrouturou	Acceptable +
Hidalgo	Acceptable +
Marchandise	Acceptable −
Agueb-Porterie	Insufficient

== Footnotes ==
- From Struggle to Victory: The Role of Civil Society in the Last French Election Commons Social Change Library. 11 December 2024. Retrieved 29 January 2025
