= Christiane Taubira =

French politician (born 1952)

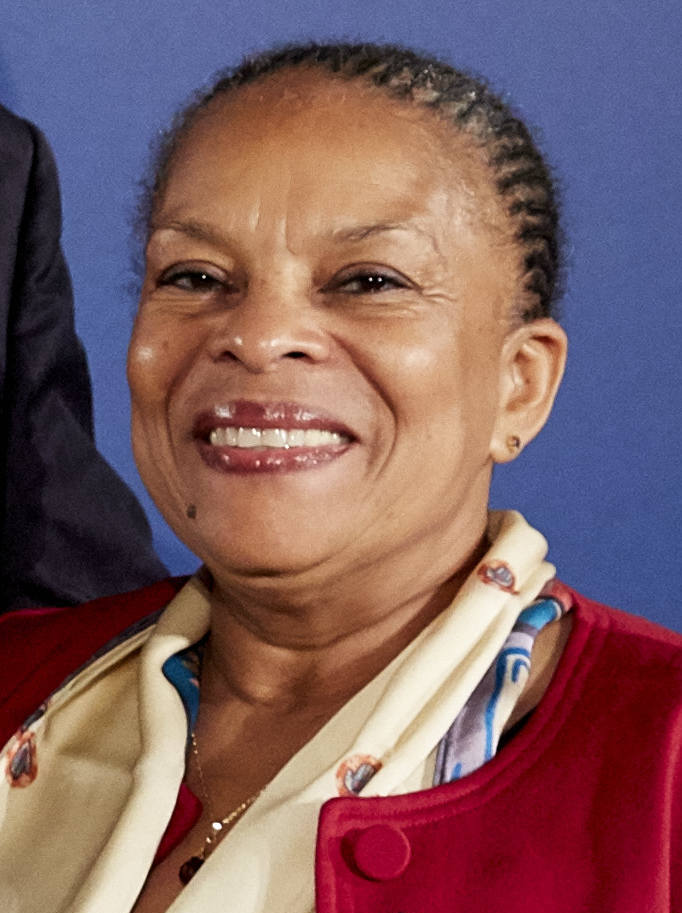
- Taubira in January 2016

Minister of Justice
- In office 16 May 2012 – 27 January 2016
- Prime Minister: Jean-Marc Ayrault; Manuel Valls
- Preceded by: Michel Mercier
- Succeeded by: Jean-Jacques Urvoas

Regional Councillor of French Guiana
- In office 26 March 2010 – 31 August 2012
- President: Rodolphe Alexandre

Member of the National Assembly for French Guiana's 1st constituency
- In office 2 April 1993 – 16 June 2012
- Preceded by: Élie Castor
- Succeeded by: Gabriel Serville

Member of the European Parliament
- In office 19 July 1994 – 19 July 1999
- Constituency: France

Personal details
- Born: Christiane Marie Taubira; 2 February 1952 (age 74) Cayenne, French Guiana, France
- Party: Walwari
- Other political affiliations: Radical Party of the Left
- Children: 4
- Relatives: Jean-Marie Taubira (brother)
- Education: Panthéon-Assas University; Paris-Sorbonne University

Christiane Marie Taubira (French: [kʁistjan maʁi tobiʁa]; born 2 February 1952) is a French politician who served as Minister of Justice of France under the governments of Prime Ministers Jean-Marc Ayrault and Manuel Valls under President François Hollande from 2012 until 2016. She was a member of the National Assembly of France for French Guiana from 1993 to 2012 and member of the European Parliament from 1994 to 1999.

She won the 2022 French People's Primary, earning the right to stand as a "unity left" candidate in the 2022 French presidential election. It was her second bid after the 2002 French presidential election where she failed to qualify to the second round after garnering only 2.32% of the votes in the first round. She dropped out of the race on 2 March 2022 after failing to get enough support to qualify.

== Early life ==
Taubira was born on 2 February 1952 in Cayenne, French Guiana, France, as one of 11 siblings and raised by a single mother. Among others, she is the sister of French politician Jean-Marie Taubira, Secretary General of the Guianese Progressive Party.

Taubira studied economics at Panthéon-Assas University, African American ethnology, sociology at Paris-Sorbonne University and food industry at the French Center for Agricultural Cooperation.

== Political career ==
=== Early beginnings ===
Having served as President of the Walwari Party, Taubira from 1993 served as a Deputy to the French National Assembly, being re-elected in 1997. Non-affiliated in 1993, she then voted in favour of the conservative Prime Minister Edouard Balladur to form a Cabinet of ministers in 1993.

=== Member of the European Parliament, 1994–1999 ===
In the 1994 European elections Taubira became a Member of the European Parliament (MEP), being the fourth on the Énergie Radicale list led by Bernard Tapie. In parliament, she served on the Committee on Development (1994–1997) and the Committee on Culture, Youth, Education and the Media (1997–1999). In addition to her committee assignments, she was part of the parliament's delegation for relations with the countries of South America.

In June 1997 Taubira joined the Socialist Party (PS), and then-Prime Minister Lionel Jospin appointed her to head a government commission into gold mining in Guiana.

=== Career in national politics ===
Taubira was the driving force behind a 21 May 2001 law that recognised the Atlantic slave trade and slavery as a crime against humanity.

In 2002 Taubira was a Left Radical Party (PRG) candidate for the Presidency although she did not belong to the Party; she won 2.32% of the votes. After 2002 she became the party's vice-president. She was elected as its Deputy in the 2002 elections and chose to join the Socialists' group in the Assembly.

In the Socialist Party's 2011 primaries, Taubira endorsed Arnaud Montebourg as the party's candidate for the 2012 presidential election.

In addition to her work in national politics Taubira served as a Regional Councillor of French Guiana from 2010 until 2012.

=== Minister of Justice, 2012–2016 ===
Taubira was nominated Minister of Justice by Prime Minister Jean-Marc Ayrault, following the victory of François Hollande in the 2012 elections. At the time, she was one of the few black, female politicians within a prominent ministry in the French government. She soon emerged as one of the most outspoken and progressive voices in the government.

Taubira was initially supposed to work with Junior Minister Delphine Batho. However, their relationship quickly broke down being unable to share responsibilities. After the June 2012 Legislative elections, Batho was moved to become Minister of Ecology replacing Nicole Bricq, leaving Taubira in charge of the Ministry of Justice. She resigned her position as Minister of Justice on 27 January 2016 after a disagreement with President Hollande over policies related to the treatment of French Nationals convicted of terrorism.

In 2013, Taubira voiced her support for land reforms in France's Caribbean territories as compensation for slavery. She also formally implemented an important electoral promise of François Hollande and introduced Law 2013-404, which legalised same-sex marriage in France.

In 2014 Taubira successfully defied opposition parties' calls for her to quit after it emerged that she knew former President Nicolas Sarkozy's phone was being tapped, apparently contradicting an earlier statement from her. She reportedly considered resigning in August 2014, along with other left-wing cabinet members such as Arnaud Montebourg, in protest against Hollande's economic policies.

Taubira resigned in January 2016 after openly disagreeing with the French president's proposal to strip French nationality from dual-citizens convicted of terrorism, a measure championed by Hollande in the wake of the terrorist attacks that shook Paris on 13 November; Minister of the Interior Manuel Valls had taken charge of the constitutional reform draft law, which would normally have been part of her portfolio. One week later, she published Murmures à la jeunesse, a book about this proposal.

=== Later career ===
Despite being urged to join the race by supporters, Taubira chose not to run in the Socialist Party's 2017 presidential primary, and remained neutral in the contest; following his nomination Taubira later endorsed Benoît Hamon as the party's candidate for the 2017 French presidential election. In the second round of the presidential election she called on voters to rally behind Emmanuel Macron.

Taubira formally announced her candidacy for the 2022 presidential election in January 2022 and won the "people's primary" intended to select a consensus left-wing candidate. By March 2022, the Constitutional Council published data showing Taubira had failed to win enough endorsements from elected officials to qualify for the presidential election.

Since the end of 2024, Taubira has held the José Bonifácio Chair at the University of São Paulo in Brazil. In this capacity, she participated in COP30, where she advocated for the preservation of the Amazon rainforest, drawing on the work of the sixty researchers she directs.

== Political views ==
=== Immigration ===
Taubira is a vocal critic of illegal immigration to French Guiana. In 2007 Taubira stated that "We are at an identity turning point. The ethnic Guyanese have become a minority on their own land" as a result of illegal immigration. In recent years Taubira has called for solidarity with refugees in Metropolitan France.

== Victim of racist attacks ==
Like other female ministers, Taubira has faced many racist and sexist insults.

Taubira allowed the Guyanese political party Walwari to make a direct citation in the Cayenne criminal court against Anne-Sophie Leclère, a candidate for the Front National who in October 2013 shared a racist cartoon comparing Taubira to a monkey on her Facebook page. Leclère was sentenced to nine months in prison and five years of ineligibility by the court before the judgement was quashed on appeal as Walwari's actions were deemed invalid.

In September 2016, the Paris criminal court, which had opened an investigation when the facts were revealed, found Leclère guilty of the crime of public insult and sentenced her to a suspended fine of 3,000 euros.

In November 2013, the Office of the United Nations High Commissioner for Human Rights condemned the comments, which it considered as racist attacks against Taubira, in particular those on the cover of the extreme right-wing weekly Minute, which featured her photo with the caption: "Clever as a monkey, Taubira finds the banana". The weekly rejected the accusation of racism, arguing that it merely used two French expressions, "the second of which - the part about the banana - is familiarly used to describe a person in good shape". The minister denounced comments of "extreme violence", denying her "belonging to the human race". The weekly's editor was sentenced to a fine of 10,000 euros for its front page on 30 October 2014. The public prosecutor's office appealed against the fine, saying that it was too lenient.

== Honours ==
- In 2016, Taubira received an honorary doctorate in Laws and Human Rights from the University of Wisconsin-Milwaukee (USA).
- On 26 September 2016, she was awarded the Sash rank of the Order of the Aztec Eagle by the then president of Mexico, Enrique Peña Nieto.
- She was awarded an honorary doctorate (dr.h.c.) in Law from the University of Geneva (Switzerland) on 9 October 2020.
- In 2018, Taubira furthermore received an honorary doctorate (DHC) from the Free University of Brussels (Belgium) for her defence of diversity as France's Minister of Justice under President François Hollande.

== Personal life ==
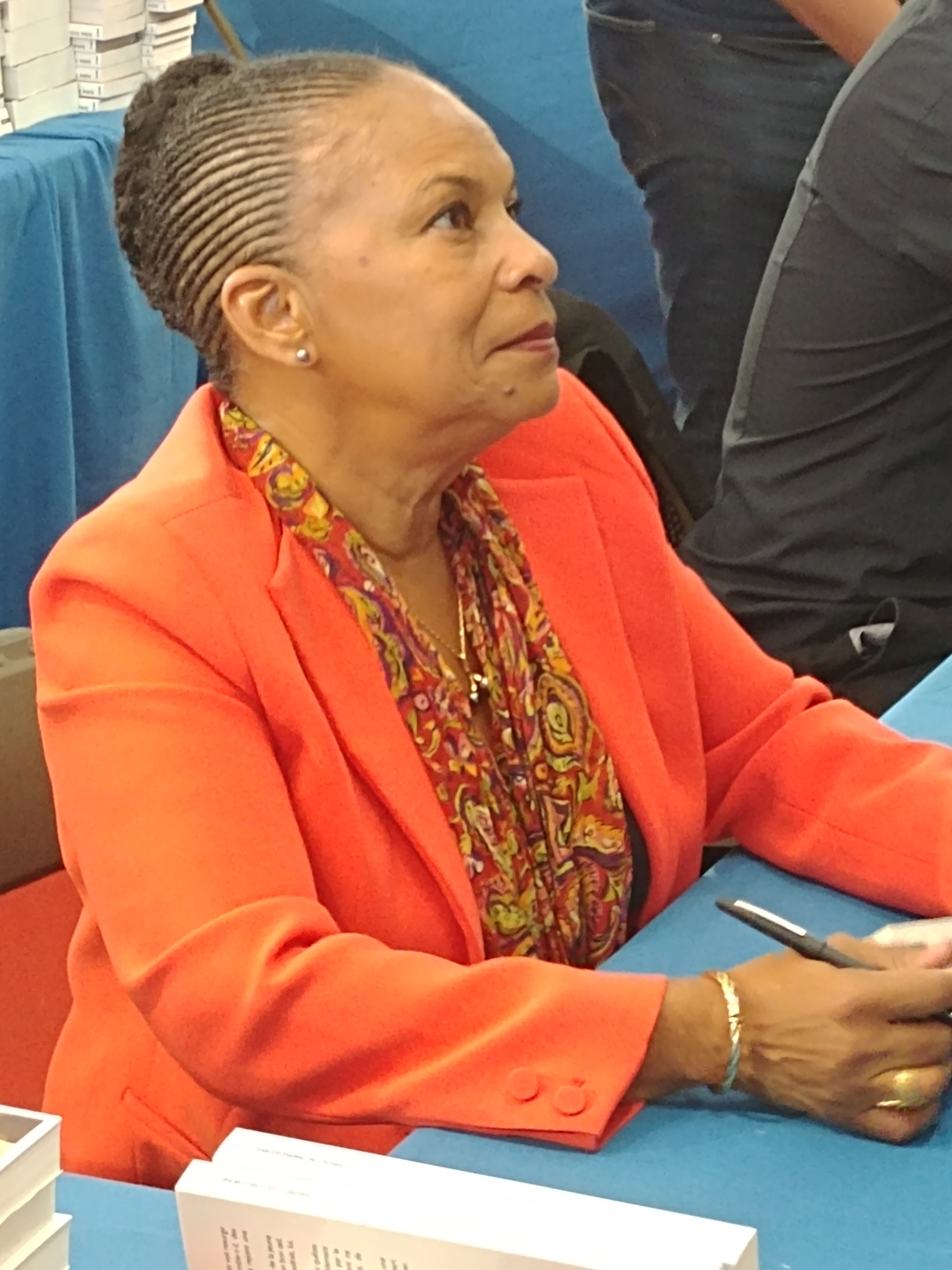
Christiane Taubira at Festival America 2018, in Vincennes.

Taubira has been married twice. She has four children with her second husband, Roland Delannon. They are divorced. Delannon is a separatist politician who founded the Decolonization and Social Emancipation Movement; he was jailed for 18 months for planning to blow up an oil and gas facility in the 1980s.

== Books ==
- (in French) L'Esclavage raconté à ma fille ("Slavery explained to my daughter"), Paris, Bibliophane, coll. « Les mots à coeur », 2002 (réimpr. 2006), 165 p. (ISBN 2-86970-064-4 et 2-86970-122-5).
- (in French) Codes noirs : de l'esclavage aux abolitions, Paris, Dalloz, coll. « A savoir », 2006, 150 p. (ISBN 2-247-06857-X) (introduction).
- (in French) Rendez-vous avec la République ("Meeting with the Republic"), Paris, La Découverte, coll. « Cahiers libres », 2006, 195 p. (ISBN 978-2-7071-5091-2).
- (in French) Égalité pour les exclus : le politique face à l'histoire et à la mémoire coloniales, Paris, Temps Présent, 2009, 93 p. (ISBN 978-2-916842-01-1).
- (in French) Mes météores : combats politiques au long cours, Paris, Flammarion, 2012, 551 p. (ISBN 978-2-08-127895-0).
- (in French) Paroles de liberté ("Words of Freedom"), Paris, Flammarion, coll. " Café Voltaire ", 2014, 138 p. (ISBN 978-2-08-133688-9).
- (in French) Murmures à la jeunesse, 2016.
- (in French) Nous habitons la Terre, 2017, REY, 128 p. (ISBN 978-2848766119).
- (in French) Nuit d'épine ("Thorny Night"), Paris, Plon, 2019, 288 p. (ISBN 978-2259278652).
- (in French) Gran Balan, Paris, Plon, 2020, 480 p. (ISBN 978-2259305013).

Political offices
Preceded by Michel Mercier	Minister of Justice; 2012–2016	Succeeded by Jean-Jacques Urvoas
