= 2022 French presidential election =

Re-election of Emmanuel Macron

- 10 April 2022 (first round); 24 April 2022 (second round)
- Opinion polls
- Turnout: 73.69% (first round) ▼4.08pp 71.99% (second round) ▼2.57pp
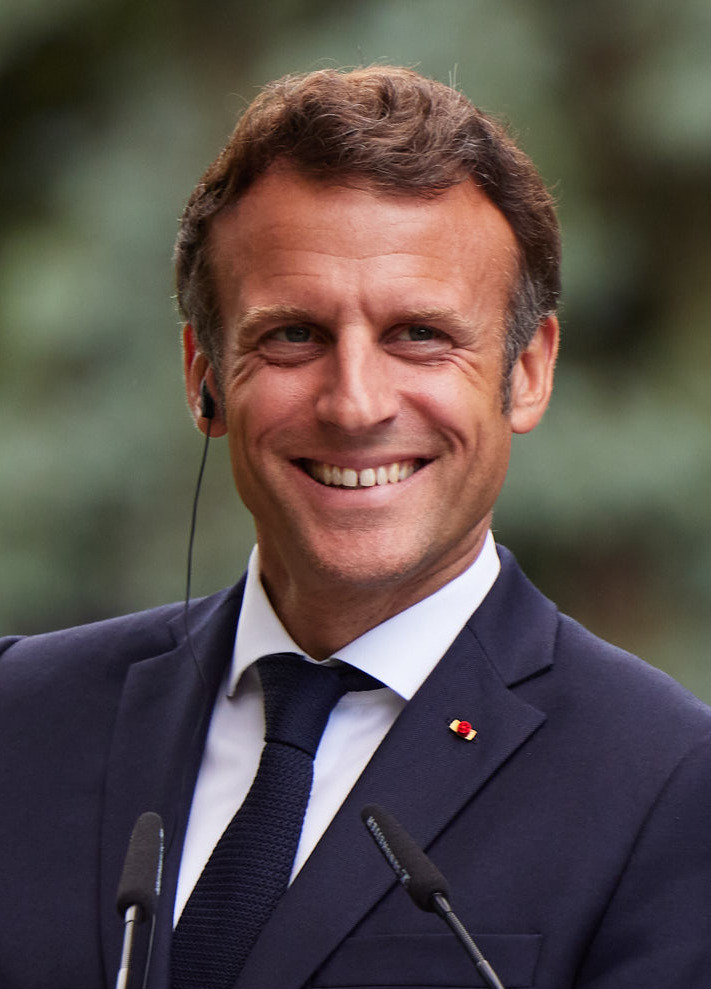

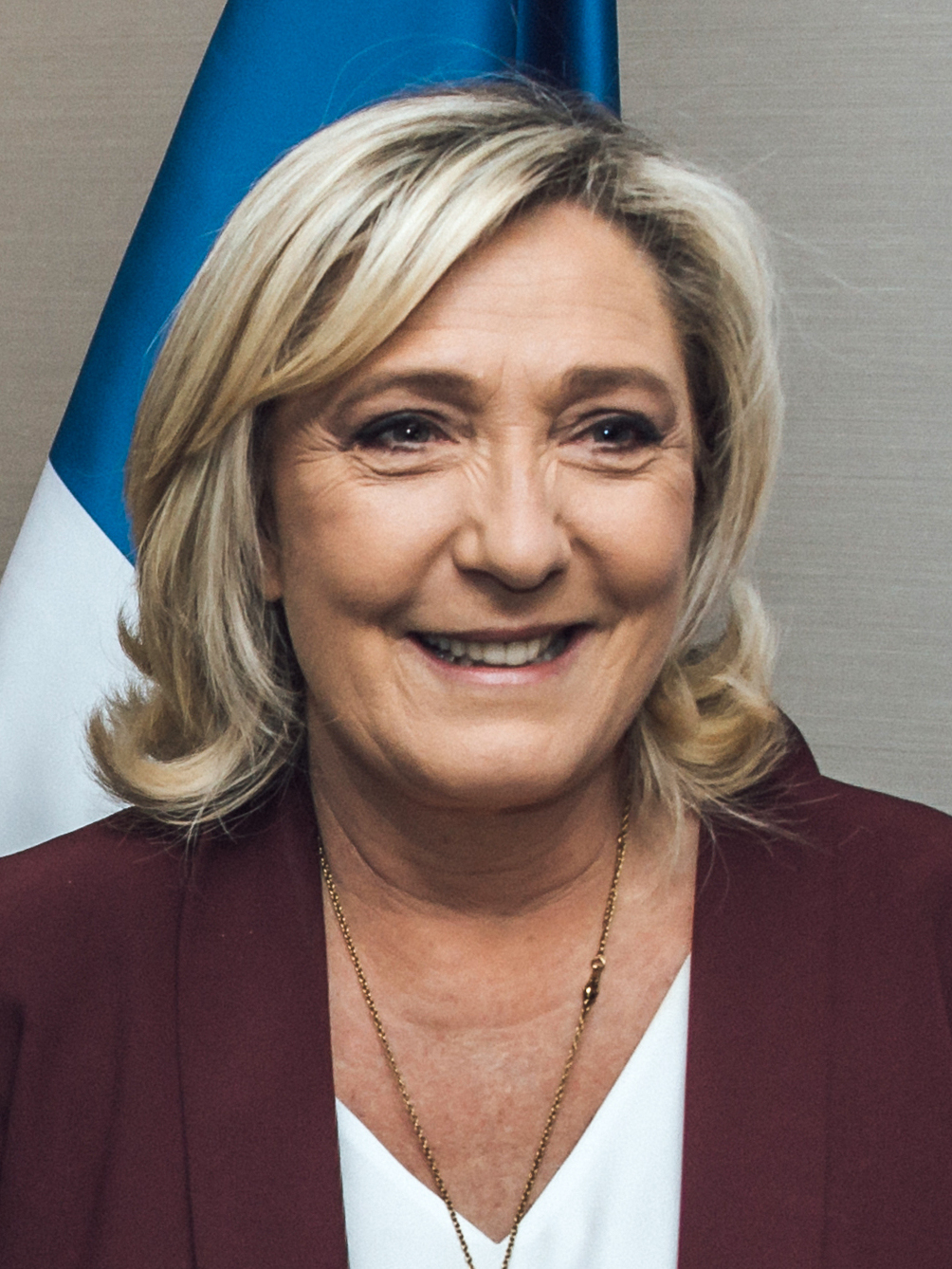
Candidate	Emmanuel Macron	Marine Le Pen
Party	LREM	RN
Popular vote	18,768,639	13,288,686
Percentage	58.55%	41.45%
President before election
Emmanuel Macron
LREM
Elected President
Emmanuel Macron
LREM

Presidential elections were held in France on 10 and 24 April 2022. As no candidate won a majority in the first round, a runoff was held, in which incumbent Emmanuel Macron defeated Marine Le Pen and was re-elected as President of France. Macron, from La République En Marche! (LREM), had defeated Le Pen, leader of the National Rally, once already in the 2017 French presidential election, for the term which expired on 13 May 2022. It was a rematch of the previous presidential election. Macron became the first president of France to win a re-election bid since Jacques Chirac won in 2002.

In the first round Macron finished first with 28% of the vote, followed by Le Pen with 23%, Jean-Luc Mélenchon of La France Insoumise with 22% and Éric Zemmour of Reconquête with 7%. Valérie Pécresse of the Republicans received 5% of the vote and Anne Hidalgo, mayor of Paris and Socialist Party candidate, 2%. Both the Republicans and the Socialists, considered to be the dominant parties until 2017, received their worst results in a presidential election.

In the second round, Macron beat Le Pen with 59% of the vote to her 41%, a narrower margin than in the 2017 election. Turnout was 72%, the lowest in a presidential election run-off since 1969. Le Pen conceded defeat after exit projections became available. The presidential election was followed by the 2022 French legislative election, held on 12–19 June, to elect the 577 members of the National Assembly, the lower house of the French Parliament.

== Electoral system ==
Official logo of the election

Under Article 7 of the Constitution of France, the president is elected to a five-year term in a two-round election. If no candidate secures an absolute majority of votes in the first round, a second round is held two weeks later between the two candidates who received the most votes. According to the Constitution of France, the first round of the presidential election must be held between 20 and 35 days before the transition of power at the end of the five-year term of the incumbent officeholder. As Emmanuel Macron took office on 14 May 2017, the transition of power was expected to take place on 13 May 2022. Correspondingly, the first round of the presidential election was to be held between 8 and 23 April 2022, with the second round held two weeks after the first. On 13 July 2021, Government Spokesman Gabriel Attal announced the dates for the election, respectively 10 April 2022 for the first round and 24 April 2022 for the eventual second round.

To be listed on the first-round ballot, candidates needed to secure at least 500 signatures (often referred to as parrainages in French) from national or local elected officials from at least 30 different departments or overseas collectivities, with no more than a tenth of these signatories from any single department. The signatures were submitted to the Constitutional Council, which is the sole authority to designate participants.

== First round ==
=== Campaign ===
Following the 2017 presidential election The Republicans (LR) sent its members a questionnaire on the topic of the "re-foundation" of the party; of the 40,000 respondents, 70% voted against an open primary like that which was held in 2016 to determine the party nominee. In a document dated 17 October 2017, the Socialist Party (PS) wrote that the financing of the 2022 presidential campaign was not assured despite "economic restructuring" but still planned to spend €12,000,000, the maximum legally permitted before the first round. According to the report, the party's leadership had seriously considered the possibility of not presenting a PS candidate in 2022.

Marine Le Pen, the president of the National Rally (RN), announced on 16 January 2020 that she would be running in the election. She previously ran in the 2012 and 2017 presidential elections as the party's candidate, then called the National Front (FN). She came third in 2012 with 17.9% of the vote in the first round and second in 2017 with 21.3% of the vote in the first round and 33.9% of the vote in the second round. Le Pen was elected to the National Assembly in the 2017 French legislative election.

Jean Lassalle, who ran in the 2017 presidential election under the Résistons! banner, coming in seventh place with 1.2% of the vote, announced that he would run again. In 2020, MP Eva Son-Forget, a radiologist who was elected to the National Assembly for La République En Marche! (LREM) in 2017, formed a new political party called Valeur Absolue and announced her intention to enter the race for the presidency. She had resigned from the LREM group after posting tweets in 2018 that were deemed sexist; she then joined the UDI and Independents group in 2019 before resigning his membership later that year.

On 8 November 2020, Jean-Luc Mélenchon, founder of La France Insoumise (LFI), announced that he would be running in the election. He previously ran in the 2012 presidential election for the Left Front (coming fourth with 11.1% of the vote in the first round) and in the 2017 presidential election for LFI (coming fourth again with 19.5% of the vote in the first round). Mélenchon was elected to the National Assembly in 2017.

In November 2021, Ensemble Citoyens was founded. It is a political coalition composed of the presidential majority led under Emmanuel Macron.

In January 2022, Éric Zemmour's party Reconquête, which was founded the month prior, gained a member of the National Assembly in Guillaume Peltier, previously elected as a member of LR, as well as two Members of the European Parliament (MEPs) when Jérôme Rivière and Gilbert Collard defected from Le Pen's RN. Previously, Son-Forget, who had declared she would run for the presidency, rallied behind Zemmour's candidacy. In early February 2022, the party gained a third MEP when Maxette Grisoni-Pirbakas defected from the RN. Stéphane Ravier became Zemmour's first supporter in the Senate after he left the RN mid-February 2022.

In February 2022, a wave of defections hit Valérie Pécresse, the candidate selected by LR, in favour of Macron. She was accused by members of the party's centrist wing of trying to pander to the voters of Zemmour, whose sharp rise in the polls has been qualified as "meteoric". During a rally in February 2022, Pécresse said "in ten years time ... will we be a sovereign nation, a US satellite or a Chinese trading post? Will we be unified or divided? Nothing is written, whether it is loss of economic status, or the Great Replacement." She was criticised for referring to the Great Replacement; she later said that her mention was not an endorsement of what she considered to be a "theory of hate".

The 2022 Russian invasion of Ukraine that began on 24 February had significant implications for the campaign. As media coverage switched to covering the war, Macron's polling improved significantly during the crisis. Le Pen and Zemmour were made to explain historic statements of praise for Vladimir Putin. In a 14 March 2022 interview with newspaper Le Figaro, Gérard Larcher, Senate President and a supporter of Pécresse, put into question the legitimacy of a possible second Macron term, stating: "If there is no campaign, the question of the legitimacy of the winner will arise." Those comments echoed Macron's refusal to participate in any debate with the other candidates prior to the election's first round.

Macron formally announced his candidacy for re-election on 3 March 2022, by which time he had already received well more than the sponsorships from elected officials to qualify for the ballot.

Marion Maréchal of the Le Pen family, granddaughter of FN founder Jean-Marie Le Pen and niece of its current leader Marine Le Pen, formalised her support for Zemmour at a large rally in Toulon on 6 March 2022. In the final days before the first round of voting, Le Pen's polling numbers improved to within the margin of error of defeating Macron in the second round, while those of Pécresse and Zemmour fell.

Mélenchon's polling numbers also surged in the final days of campaigning. Left-leaning independent candidate Christiane Taubira, former Minister of Justice (2012–2014) under President François Hollande and winner of the 2022 People's Primary vote, withdrew her candidacy on 2 March 2022, endorsing Mélenchon.

=== Primaries and congresses ===
==== Ecologist primary ====
In September 2021, the Ecology Pole organised a presidential primary to determine their candidate. The following candidates participated in this primary:

Nominee

- Yannick Jadot, member of the European Parliament since 2009

Eliminated

- Sandrine Rousseau, deputy national secretary of Europe Ecology – The Greens from 2016 to 2017
- Delphine Batho, president of Ecology Generation and deputy for the 2nd constituency of Deux-Sèvres since 2013
- Éric Piolle, mayor of Grenoble since 2014
- Jean-Marc Governatori, co-president of Cap Écologie and city councillor for Nice since 2020.

==== Socialist primary ====
In October 2021, the Socialist Party had its primary. Mayor of Paris Anne Hidalgo won with 72% of the vote.

Nominee

- Anne Hidalgo, mayor of Paris since 2014

Eliminated

- Stéphane Le Foll, mayor of Le Mans since 2018

==== People's Primary ====
Independent activists launched a primary with the intention of nominating a unity left-wing candidate. The voting took place online from 27 to 30 January 2022. Of the seven candidates listed in the primary, three declined to participate. The primary was conducted according to a majority judgment voting system, in which all voters are to rate all candidates, with the candidate with the highest median rating winning.

Nominee

- Christiane Taubira, minister of justice 2012–2016 (withdrew, endorsed Mélenchon)

Eliminated

- Anna Agueb-Porterie, environmental activist
- Anne Hidalgo, mayor of Paris since 2014, Socialist Party candidate (still a candidate)
- Yannick Jadot, member of the European Parliament since 2009, Green Party candidate (still a candidate)
- Pierre Larrouturou, member of the European Parliament since 2019
- Charlotte Marchandise, public health expert
- Jean-Luc Mélenchon, member of the National Assembly, La France Insoumise candidate (still a candidate)

==== The Republicans congress ====
The Republicans selected their candidate via a congress of party members. On 4 December 2021, Valérie Pécresse won the nomination with 60.95% of the votes against Éric Ciotti.

Nominee

- Valérie Pécresse, president of the Regional Council of Île-de-France since 2016

Eliminated

- Éric Ciotti, deputy for the 1st constituency of Alpes-Maritimes since 2007
- Michel Barnier, head of the Task Force for Relations with the United Kingdom from 2019 to 2021
- Xavier Bertrand, president of the Regional Council of Hauts-de-France since 2016
- Philippe Juvin, mayor of La Garenne-Colombes since 2001

=== Candidates ===
On 7 March 2022, the Constitutional Council published names of the 12 candidates who received 500 valid sponsorships, with the order determined by drawing lots.

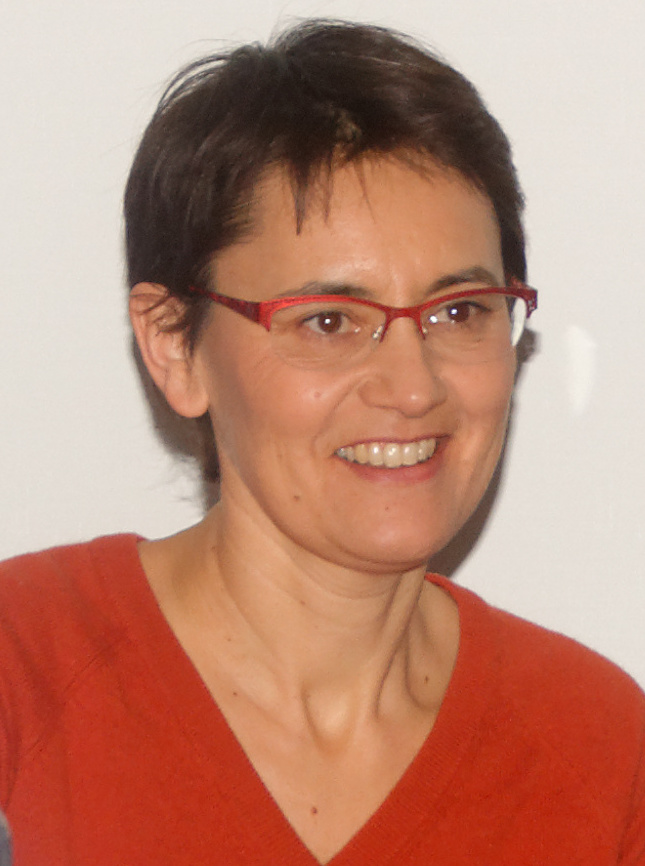
Nathalie Arthaud
Workers' Struggle

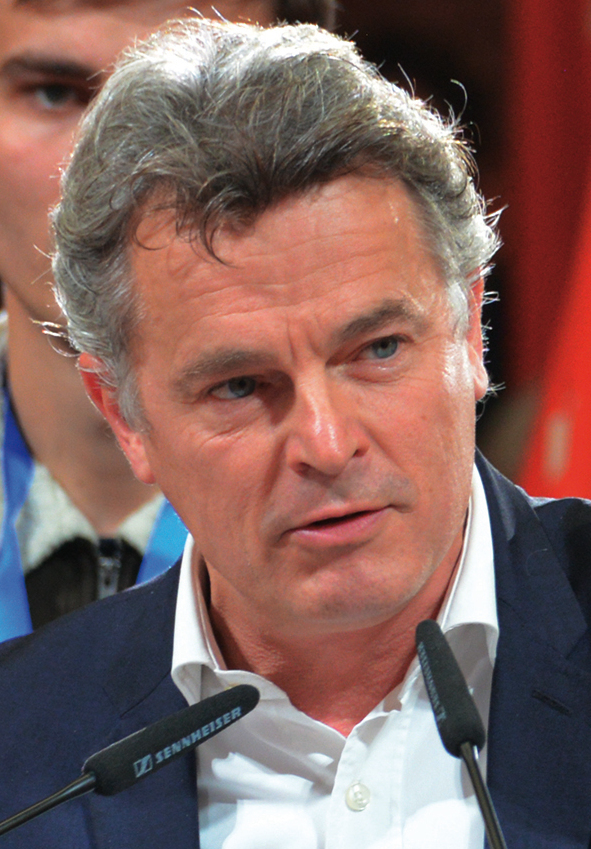
Fabien Roussel
French Communist Party

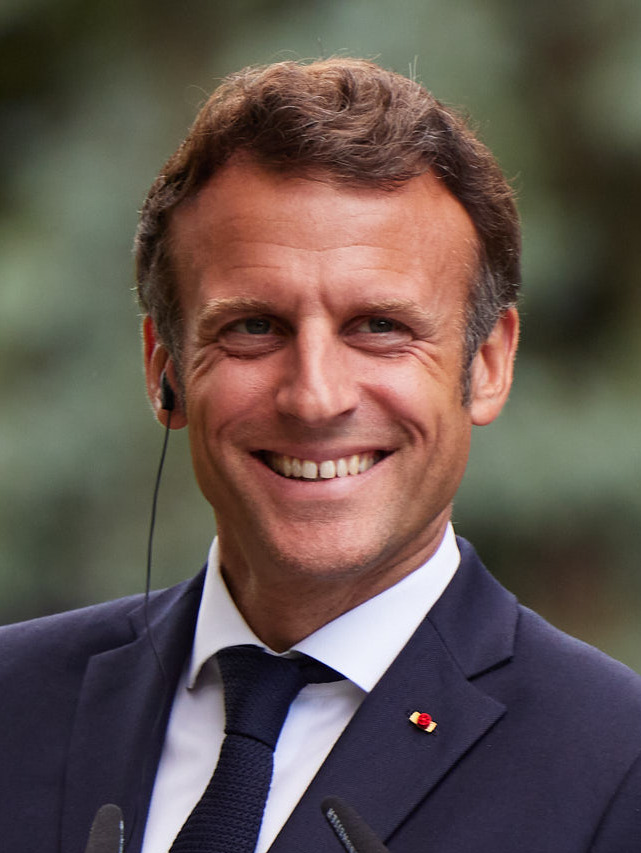
Emmanuel Macron
La République En Marche!

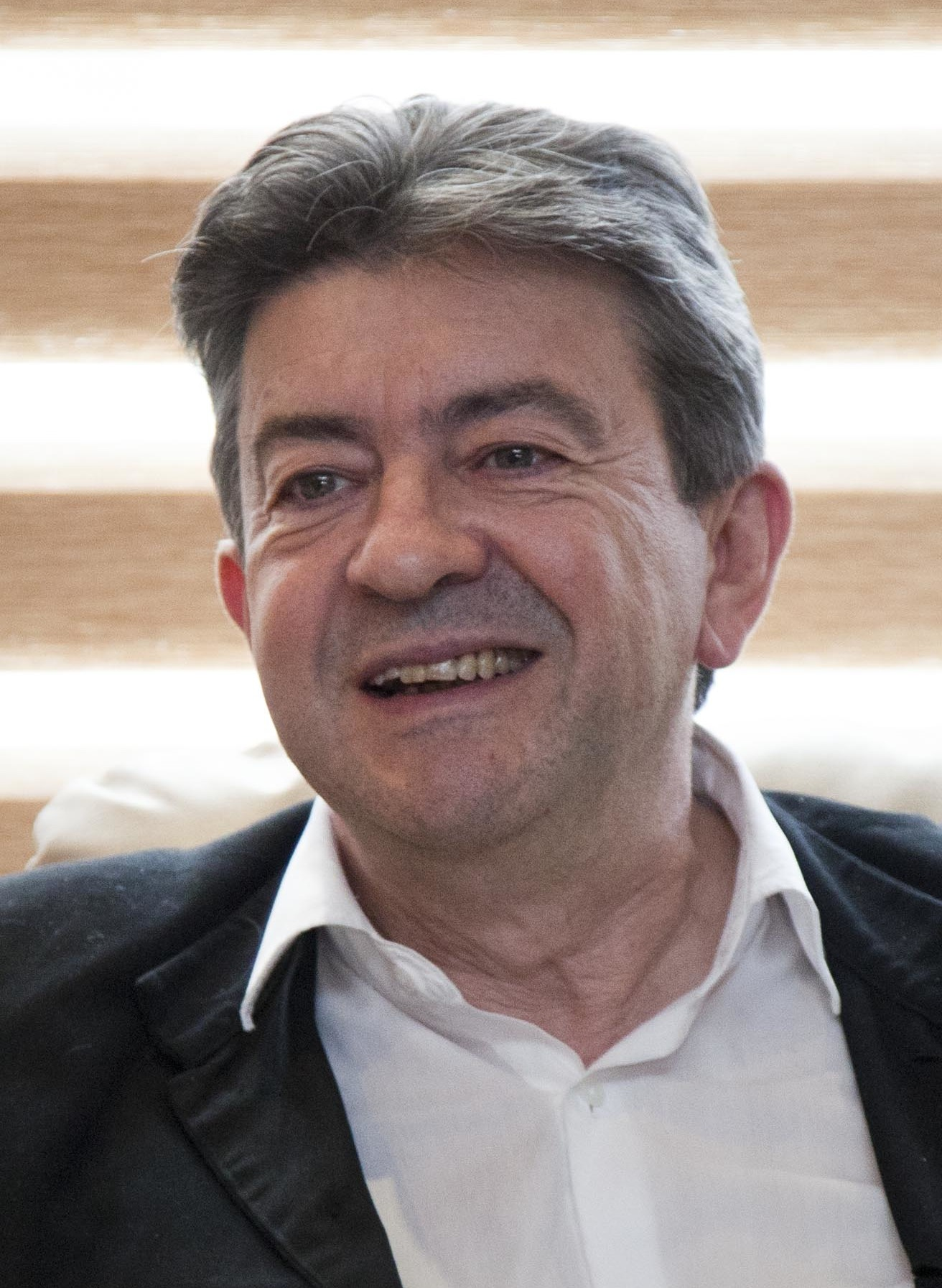
Jean-Luc Mélenchon
La France Insoumise

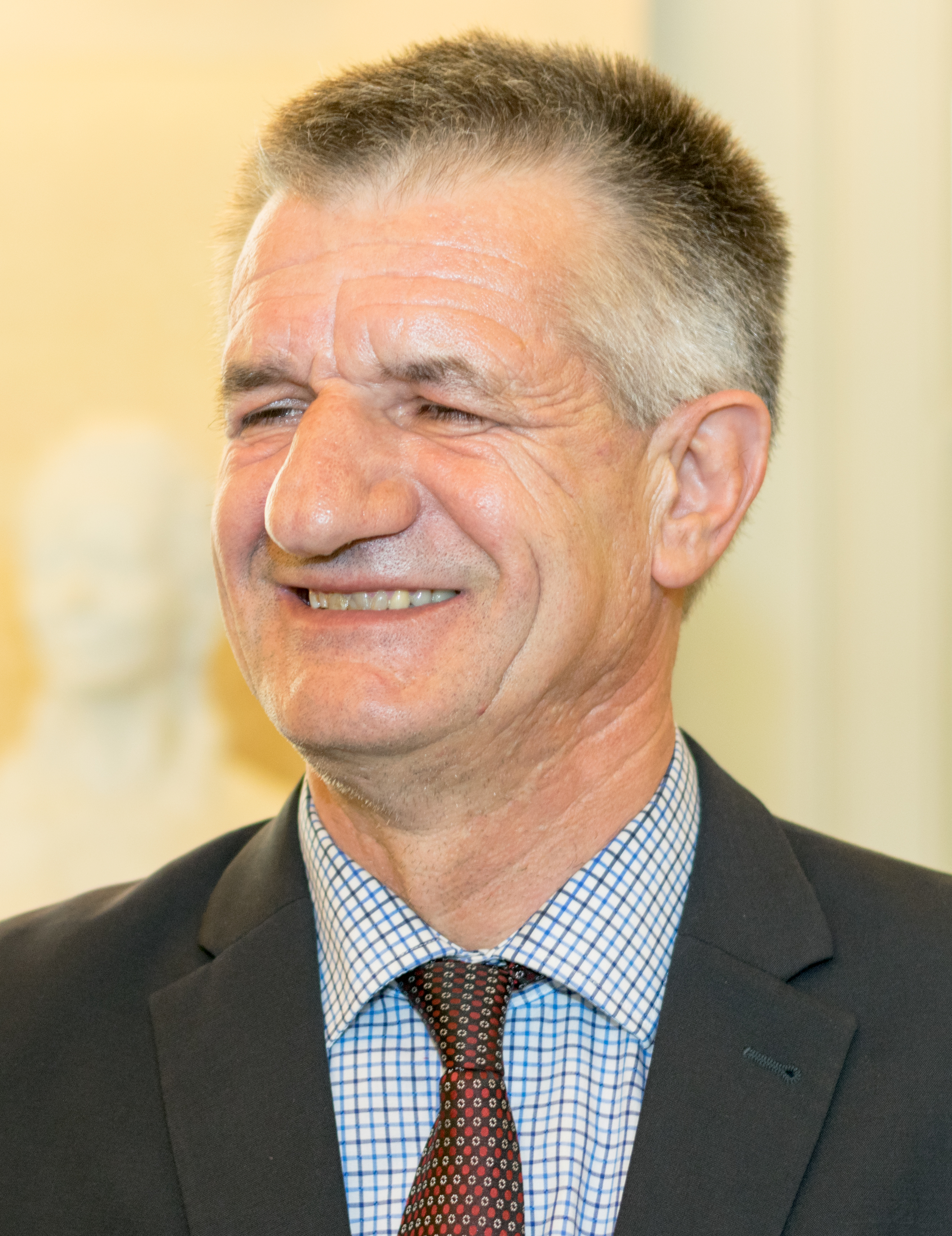
Jean Lassalle
Résistons!

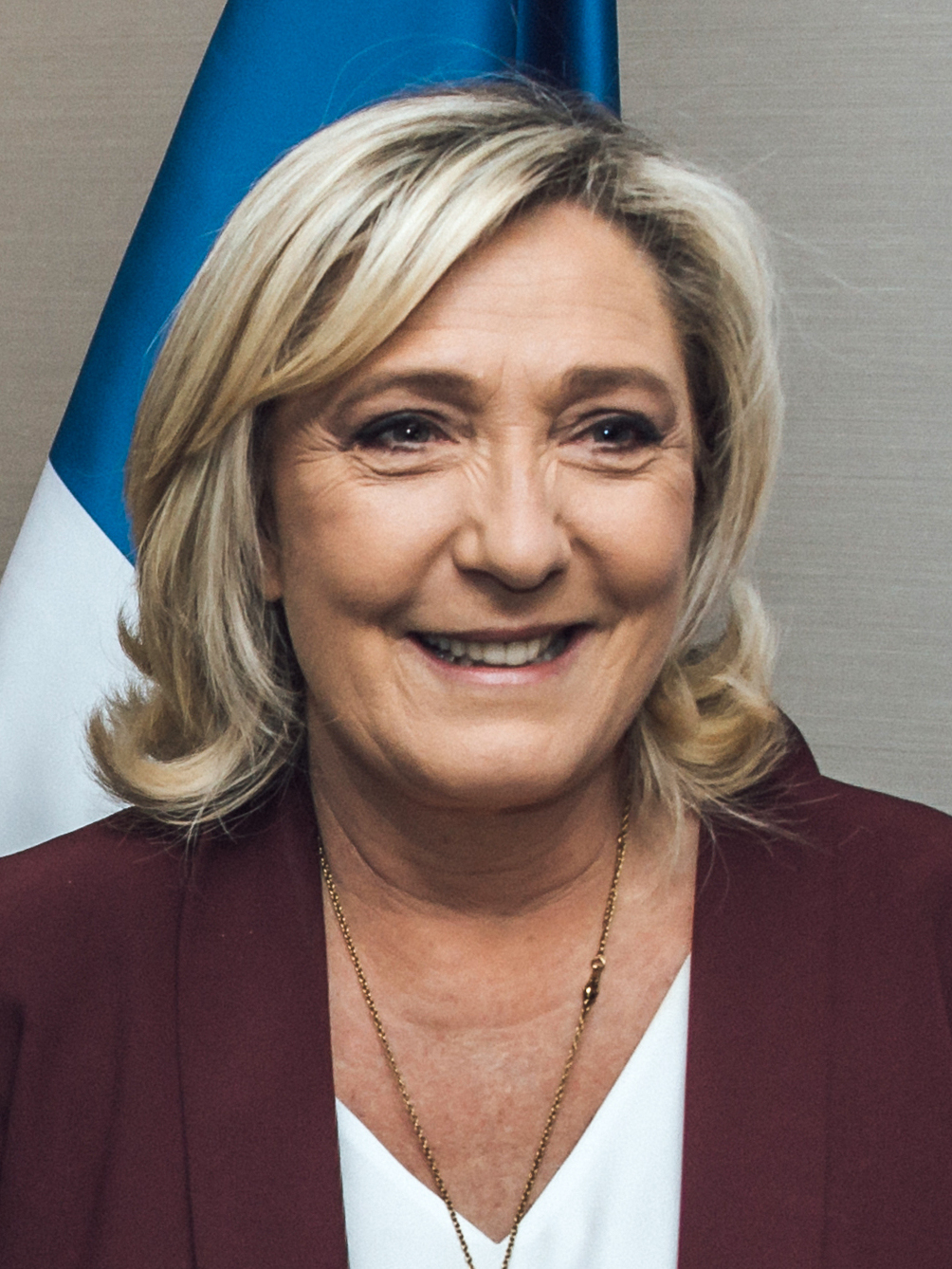
Marine Le Pen
National Rally

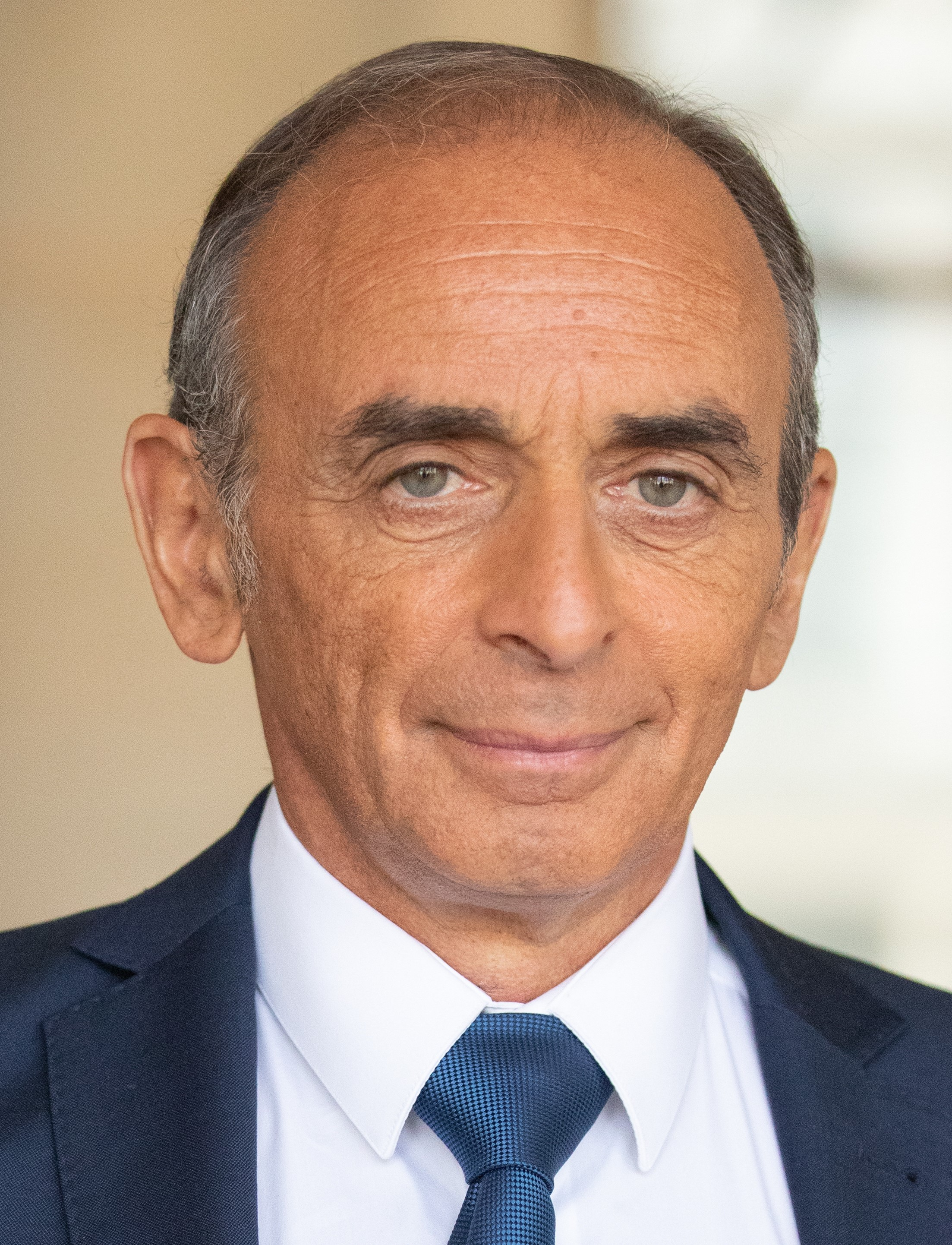
Éric Zemmour
Reconquête!

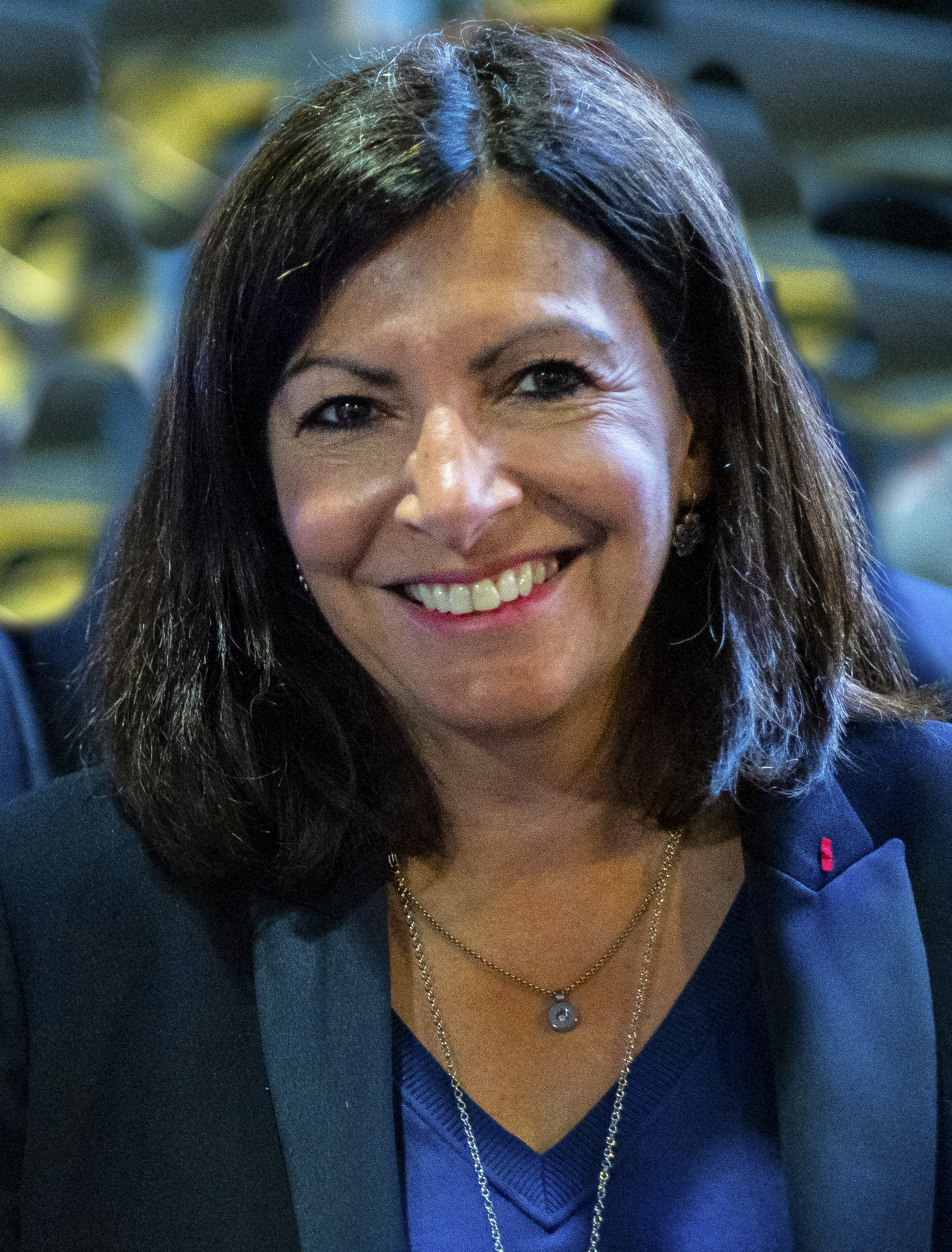
Anne Hidalgo
Socialist Party

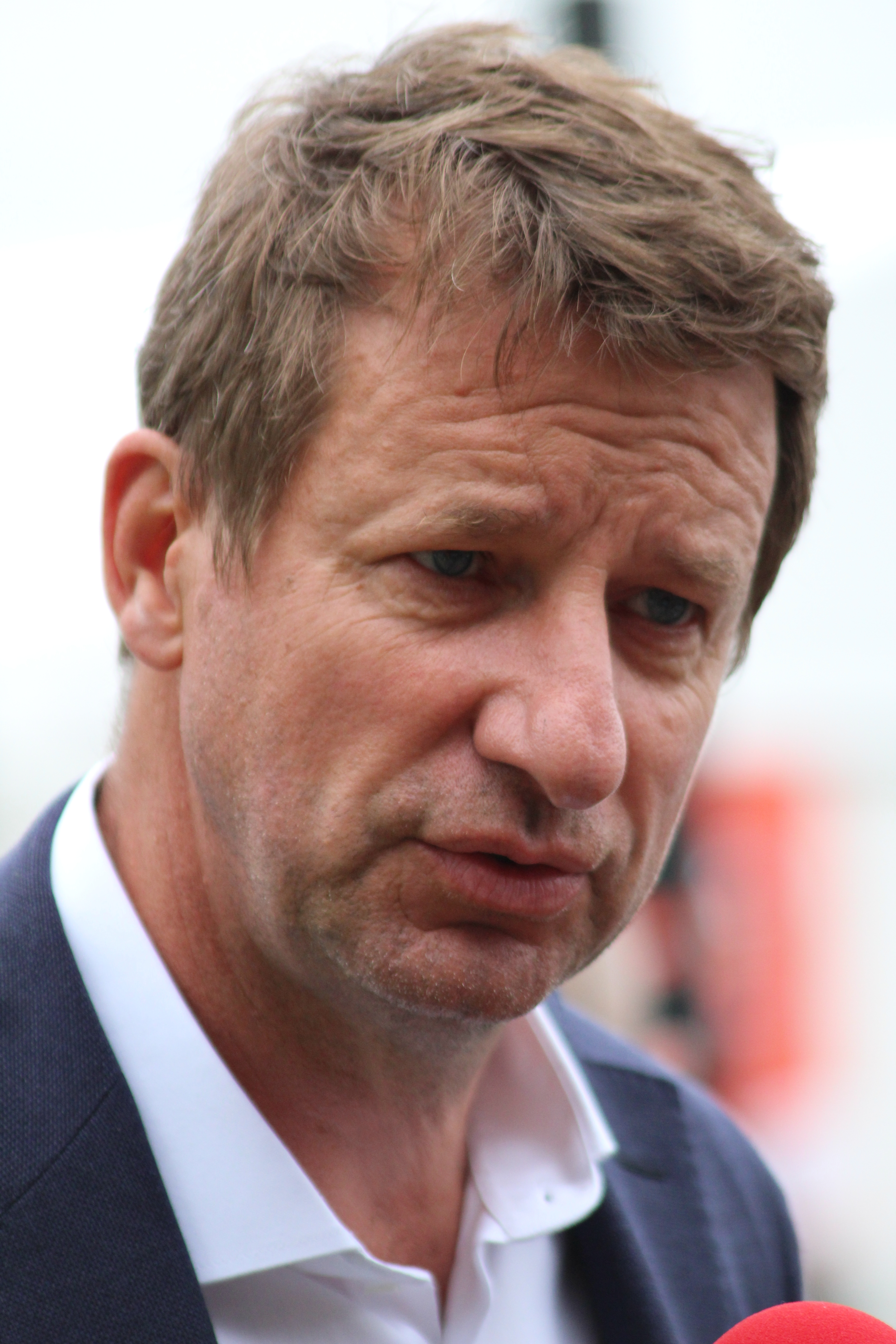
Yannick Jadot
Europe Ecology – The Greens

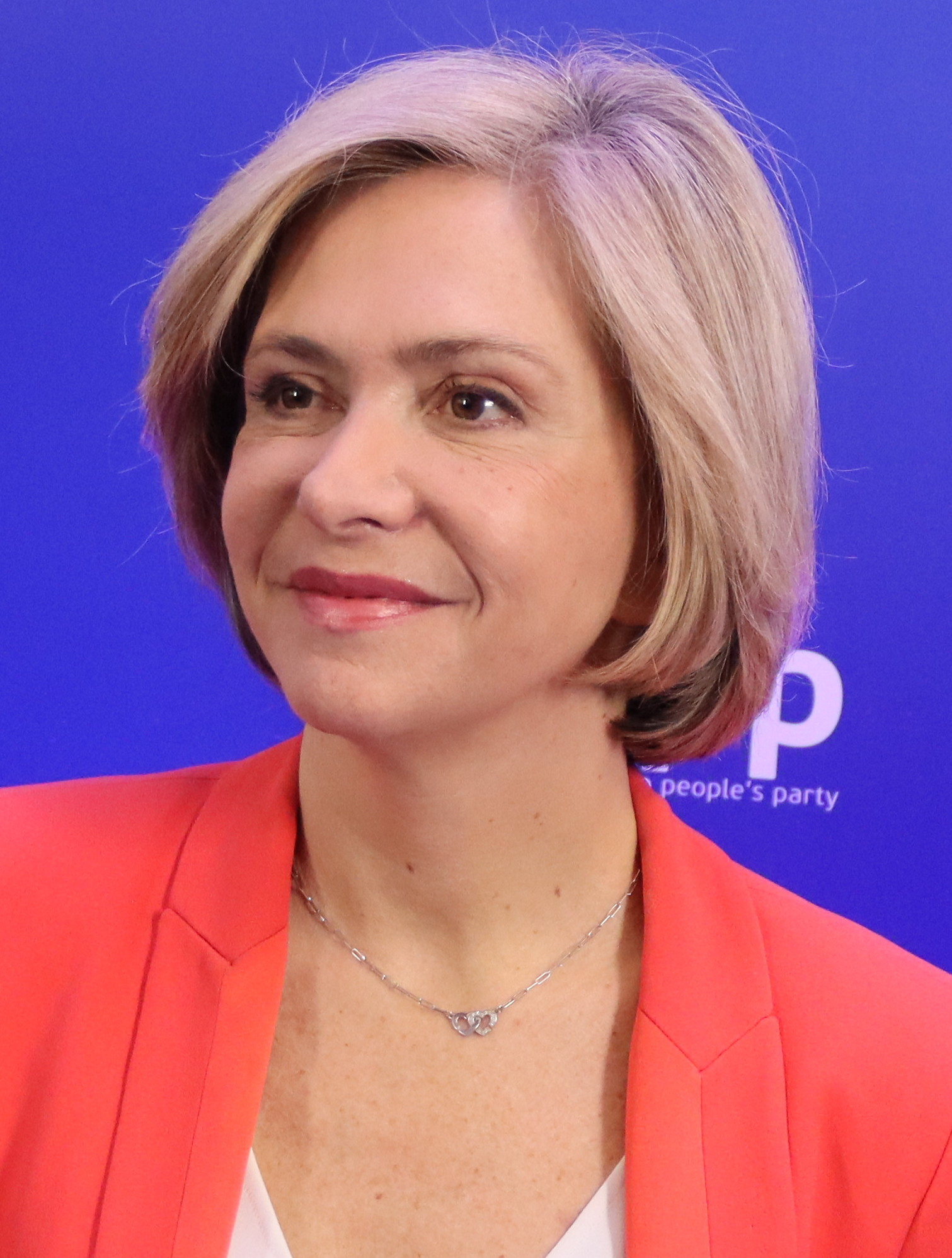
Valérie Pécresse
The Republicans

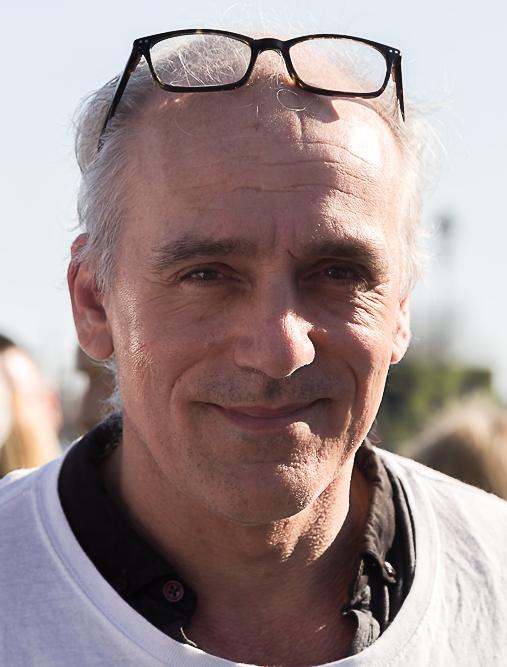
Philippe Poutou
New Anticapitalist Party

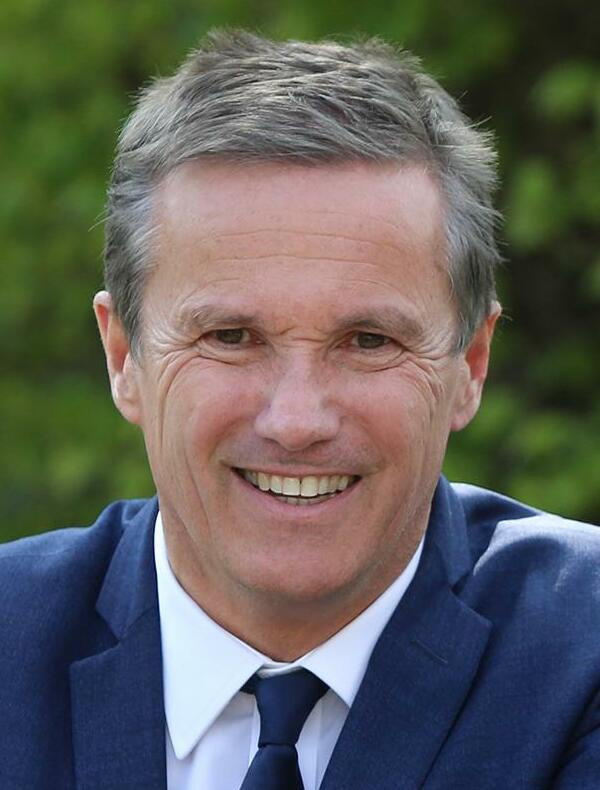
Nicolas Dupont-Aignan
Debout la France

==== Sponsorships ====
A candidate must have secured 500 Présentation signatures from elected officials in order to appear on the first-round ballot. The signature collection period ended on 4 March. The table below lists sponsorships received by the Constitutional Council by candidate. On the form, this is named a présentation but is more widely known as parrainage. There were 46 individuals who received at least 1 sponsorship as of the closing date deadline of 4 March 2022. Some of them received sponsorships without being candidates, and one sponsored himself. Candidates labeled SE (sans etiquette) do not belong to any political party.

Colour legend

1–50	51–100	101–150	151–200	201–250	251–300	301–350	351–400	401–450	451–500	500+

Signatures received by the Constitutional Council as of 7 March
Candidate	Party	1 Feb	3 Feb	8 Feb	10 Feb	15 Feb	17 Feb	22 Feb	24 Feb	1 Mar	3 Mar	4 Mar	Total	Notes
Christian-Jacques Arnal	SE	0	0	0	0	0	0	0	0	0	1	0	1	Not a candidate
Nathalie Arthaud	LO	12	126	230	51	90	20	30	3	6	2	6	576	500 signatures validated by 15 February
François Asselineau	UPR	10	46	115	22	17	7	24	6	16	16	14	293	
Michel Barnier	LR	0	1	0	0	0	0	0	0	0	0	0	1	Not the nominee of LR
Corinne Bekaert	SE	0	0	1	0	2	0	0	1	1	0	1	6	
Christophe Blanchet	LREM	0	0	0	0	0	0	0	0	1	0	0	1	Not a candidate
Jean-Louis Borloo	UDI (Note: The Union of Democrats and Independents (UDI) announced it would support the candidate put forward by The Republicans (LR), Valérie Pécresse.)	0	0	0	0	0	0	0	1	0	0	0	1	Not a candidate
Thierry Cahez	SE	0	0	0	0	0	0	1	0	0	0	0	1	
Marie Cau	SE	0	0	1	0	1	1	0	1	1	2	1	8	
Bernard Cazeneuve	PS	0	0	0	0	0	0	0	0	0	0	1	1	
Michel Chaudot	SE	0	0	0	0	0	0	0	0	0	0	1	1	
Arnaud Chiche	SE	0	1	3	1	3	0	1	0	3	4	5	21	
Patrick Cojan	SE	0	0	0	0	1	0	0	0	0	0	0	1	Not a candidate
Vincent Delaby	SE	0	0	0	0	0	0	0	0	0	0	1	1	
Carole Delga	PS	0	0	0	0	0	1	0	0	0	0	0	1	Not a candidate
Nicolas Dupont-Aignan	DLF	10	67	155	48	80	19	43	35	75	50	18	600	500 signatures validated by 1 March
Clara Egger	SE	0	3	3	1	6	3	6	2	4	6	2	36	
Bertrand Fessard de Foucault	SE	0	0	0	1	0	0	0	0	0	0	0	1	
Éric Régis Fiorile	SE	0	0	0	0	0	1	0	0	0	1	0	2	
Jean-Marc Fortané	SE	0	0	0	1	0	0	2	0	4	2	3	12	
Jean Baptiste Giffon	SE	0	0	0	0	0	0	0	0	0	1	0	1	
Raphaël Glucksmann	PP	0	0	0	0	0	0	0	0	0	1	0	1	Not a candidate
Cédric Herrou	SE	0	0	0	0	0	0	0	0	0	0	1	1	
Anne Hidalgo	PS	48	218	386	138	217	67	103	49	92	69	43	1,440	500 signatures validated by 8 February
François Hollande	PS	0	0	0	0	1	0	0	0	0	0	0	1	Not a candidate
Yannick Jadot	EELV	11	69	188	57	125	40	75	50	54	20	23	712	500 signatures validated by 22 February
Alexandre Juving-Brunet	SE	0	0	0	0	0	0	0	0	2	0	0	2	
Anasse Kazib	RP	1	20	63	15	17	6	6	2	14	5	11	155	
Gaspard Koenig	S	0	2	21	4	1	3	7	11	23	19	16	107	
Georges Kuzmanovic	RS	1	8	16	2	8	3	2	2	3	1	3	48	
Nicolas Lacroix	LR	0	0	0	0	0	0	0	0	2	0	0	2	Not a candidate
Yaya Lam	SE	0	0	0	0	1	0	0	0	0	0	0	1	
Jean Lassalle	RES	15	109	192	66	89	32	58	18	23	18	22	642	500 signatures validated by 17 February
Christian Laurut	SE	0	0	0	0	0	0	0	1	1	0	0	2	
Marine Le Pen	RN	2	33	104	135	57	35	27	21	89	100	19	622	500 signatures validated by 1 March
Emmanuel Macron	LREM	105	424	397	124	210	85	118	81	241	189	124	2,098	500 signatures validated by 3 February
Philippe Célestin Marechal	SE	0	0	1	0	0	0	0	0	0	0	0	1	Self-sponsored
Antoine Martinez	VPF	0	0	5	0	2	2	1	1	1	1	0	13	
Philippe Mazuel	PACE	0	0	1	0	0	0	0	0	0	0	0	1	
Jean-Luc Mélenchon	LFI	14	86	124	34	74	38	72	98	268	65	33	906	500 signatures validated by 24 February
Emmanuelle Ménard	EXD	0	0	0	0	1	0	0	0	0	0	0	1	Not a candidate
Guillaume Meurice	SE	0	0	0	0	1	0	0	1	1	3	0	6	Not a candidate
Nicolas Miguet	RCF	0	2	7	0	3	0	0	6	9	8	5	40	
Arnaud Montebourg	DVG	0	0	0	0	0	0	0	1	0	0	0	1	Withdrew candidacy on 19 January
Paul Montserrat	SE	0	0	0	0	0	0	0	0	1	0	0	1	
Valérie Pécresse	LR	34	290	615	310	575	121	198	128	186	99	80	2,636	500 signatures validated by 8 February
Thomas Pesquet	SE	0	0	0	0	0	0	0	0	1	0	0	1	Not a candidate
Édouard Philippe	Horizons	0	0	0	0	0	0	0	0	0	1	0	1	Not a candidate
Florian Philippot	LP	0	0	0	1	0	0	0	0	0	0	0	1	Withdrew candidacy on 18 February
Philippe Poutou	NPA	4	50	73	19	42	11	25	19	99	97	157	596	500 signatures validated by 4 March
Stéphanie Rivoal	SE	0	0	0	1	1	0	0	0	0	0	0	2	
Martin Rocca	SE	0	0	1	1	1	0	0	0	5	1	0	9	
Antoine Rocquemont	SE	0	0	0	0	0	0	1	0	0	0	0	1	
Fabien Roussel	PCF	30	129	167	55	111	37	53	11	20	6	7	626	500 signatures validated by 17 February
François Ruffin	PD	0	0	0	0	0	0	0	0	0	1	0	1	Not a candidate
Laëtitia Saint-Paul	LREM	0	0	0	0	0	0	0	0	0	0	0	1	Not a candidate
Josef Schovanec	SE	0	0	1	0	0	0	0	0	0	0	0	1	Not a candidate
Rafik Smati	OF	0	0	2	0	3	2	1	0	1	0	1	10	
Christiane Taubira	Walwari	0	8	28	11	26	13	18	24	53	60	33	274	Withdrew candidacy on 2 March
Hélène Thouy	PA	2	20	26	8	14	4	15	8	17	10	15	139	
Gildas Vieira	LaFRA	0	0	0	1	0	0	0	1	0	0	0	2	
Antoine Waechter	MEI	0	0	0	0	1	1	1	1	0	3	0	7	
Stéphane Wendlinger	SE	0	0	0	0	1	0	0	0	0	0	0	1	
Éric Zemmour	REC	14	44	91	32	69	41	59	65	205	101	20	741	500 signatures validated by 1 March
Total		313	1,756	3,017	1,139	1,851	593	948	648	1,523	963		12,751	

=== Electorate ===
Sociology of the electorate
Demographic	Arthaud/ Poutou	Mélenchon	Roussel	Jadot	Hidalgo	Macron	Pécresse	Lassalle	Dupont-Aignan	Le Pen	Zemmour	Turnout
Total vote	1.4%	22.0%	2.3%	4.6%	1.8%	27.8%	4.8%	3.1%	2.1%	23.2%	7.1%	73.7%
First-round vote in 2017
Jean-Luc Mélenchon	2%	69%	7%	3%	2%	6%	0%	3%	1%	6%	1%	81%
Benoit Hamon	2%	46%	5%	19%	10%	12%	0%	2%	0%	3%	2%	80%
Emmanuel Macron	1%	9%	1%	5%	3%	73%	2%	1%	0%	3%	2%	84%
Francois Fillon	0%	2%	0%	3%	0%	39%	21%	2%	2%	18%	13%	78%
Marine Le Pen	0%	2%	0%	1%	0%	3%	1%	0%	1%	78%	14%	79%
Political party
LFI	1%	95%	0%	0%	0%	1%	0%	0%	0%	3%	0%	78%
PS	1%	37%	6%	4%	18%	28%	0%	1%	0%	5%	0%	76%
EELV	1%	30%	1%	50%	1%	13%	1%	1%	0%	2%	0%	79%
LREM-MoDem	1%	3%	1%	0%	0%	91%	1%	1%	0%	2%	0%	82%
LR-UDI	0%	2%	0%	0%	0%	25%	37%	4%	2%	20%	10%	79%
FN	0%	1%	0%	0%	0%	1%	0%	1%	1%	94%	2%	80%
REC	0%	0%	0%	0%	0%	0%	0%	3%	0%	7%	90%	77%
None	3%	21%	2%	3%	1%	29%	3%	8%	2%	24%	4%	64%
Sex
Men	1%	22%	2%	4%	1%	27%	5%	4%	2%	23%	9%	73%
Women	2%	22%	3%	5%	2%	29%	4%	3%	2%	23%	5%	75%
Age
18–24 years old	1%	34%	2%	6%	1%	20%	2%	1%	0%	25%	8%	58%
25–34 years old	3%	36%	0%	4%	1%	22%	3%	2%	0%	24%	5%	54%
35–49 years old	3%	24%	3%	5%	2%	24%	2%	4%	2%	27%	4%	78%
50–59 years old	0%	24%	2%	4%	1%	23%	3%	4%	2%	30%	7%	80%
60–69 years old	1%	18%	3%	5%	2%	30%	4%	4%	2%	22%	9%	88%
70 or older	1%	9%	2%	4%	3%	41%	12%	2%	3%	13%	10%	77%
Socio-occupational classification
Manager/professional	1%	27%	1%	6%	3%	34%	6%	4%	2%	11%	5%	74%
Intermediate occupation	0%	27%	4%	5%	2%	27%	3%	4%	1%	24%	3%	73%
White-collar worker	2%	27%	1%	4%	2%	17%	2%	2%	2%	35%	6%	73%
Blue-collar worker	2%	25%	2%	2%	0%	17%	2%	3%	3%	35%	9%	67%
Retired	1%	13%	3%	4%	2%	37%	9%	3%	3%	17%	8%	81%
Employment status
Employee	2%	26%	2%	4%	2%	24%	3%	3%	2%	27%	5%	71%
Private employee	1%	25%	2%	3%	1%	26%	4%	3%	2%	27%	6%	69%
Public employee	1%	27%	3%	7%	2%	22%	2%	4%	1%	27%	4%	75%
Self-employed	2%	27%	0%	8%	0%	26%	2%	4%	3%	18%	10%	76%
Unemployed	2%	37%	1%	2%	2%	12%	1%	3%	5%	28%	7%	65%
Education
Less than baccalauréat	2%	16%	2%	4%	1%	23%	5%	3%	3%	34%	7%	76%
Baccalauréat	0%	24%	3%	3%	1%	25%	4%	4%	2%	26%	8%	72%
Bac +2	0%	18%	2%	5%	2%	31%	6%	4%	1%	23%	8%	75%
At least bac +3	2%	28%	2%	7%	2%	32%	5%	3%	2%	12%	5%	73%
Monthly household income
Less than €1,250	1%	30%	1%	5%	1%	13%	2%	2%	4%	31%	10%	66%
€1,250 to €2,000	2%	27%	3%	5%	1%	23%	3%	3%	1%	25%	7%	71%
€2,000 to €3,000	0%	20%	3%	5%	1%	26%	5%	3%	3%	27%	7%	75%
More than €3,000	1%	19%	2%	4%	2%	34%	6%	4%	2%	19%	7%	77%
Moment of choice of vote
Several months ago	1%	16%	2%	4%	1%	35%	5%	2%	1%	24%	9%	N/A
A few weeks ago	1%	30%	3%	5%	3%	22%	3%	4%	2%	24%	3%	N/A
In the last few days/final moment	2%	33%	4%	7%	2%	12%	5%	7%	4%	20%	4%	N/A
Agglomeration
Less than 2,000 inhabitants	3%	22%	2%	4%	2%	25%	3%	4%	3%	26%	6%	76%
2,000 to 9,999 inhabitants	1%	20%	3%	5%	1%	22%	2%	6%	3%	28%	9%	76%
10,000 to 49,000 inhabitants	1%	19%	2%	4%	2%	31%	7%	4%	1%	23%	6%	76%
50,000 to 199,999 inhabitants	0%	18%	2%	5%	2%	35%	6%	1%	2%	24%	6%	74%
More than 200,000 inhabitants	1%	25%	2%	5%	1%	29%	5%	3%	2%	19%	8%	71%
Religion
Catholic	1%	12%	2%	4%	1%	31%	7%	3%	2%	27%	10%	N/A
Regular practitioner	1%	6%	2%	4%	2%	34%	14%	3%	6%	9%	19%	N/A
Occasional practitioner	0%	15%	2%	6%	0%	30%	9%	3%	3%	19%	13%	N/A
Non-practitioner	1%	11%	2%	4%	1%	31%	6%	4%	2%	30%	8%	N/A
Others	1%	38%	1%	6%	2%	22%	7%	2%	5%	12%	4%	N/A
None	2%	32%	3%	5%	2%	24%	2%	3%	1%	21%	5%	N/A
Demographic												Turnout
Demographic	Arthaud/ Poutou	Mélenchon	Roussel	Jadot	Hidalgo	Macron	Pécresse	Lassalle	Dupont-Aignan	Le Pen	Zemmour	Turnout
Sociology of the electorate
Source: Ipsos France

== Second round ==
=== Endorsements ===
Arthaud and Lassalle both said they would vote blank, with Lassalle saying that he trusted the French people to do what is right. Mélenchon and Poutou stated their opposition to Le Pen but did not endorse Macron. Hidalgo, Jadot, Pécresse and Roussel all supported Macron.

Candidate	Endorsement
Anne Hidalgo	Emmanuel Macron
Yannick Jadot	Emmanuel Macron
Valérie Pécresse	Emmanuel Macron
Fabien Roussel	Emmanuel Macron
Nicolas Dupont-Aignan	Marine Le Pen
Éric Zemmour	Marine Le Pen
Nathalie Arthaud	No endorsement
Jean Lassalle	No endorsement
Jean-Luc Mélenchon	Against Le Pen
Philippe Poutou	Against Le Pen

=== Campaign ===
On 14 April 2022, Le Pen said if elected she would hold a referendum on whether to reinstate capital punishment in France, if such a proposal garnered enough signatures under the citizens' initiative referendum system she wants to implement. Le Pen had also campaigned for a ban on wearing Muslim headscarves in public.

On 20 April, the only election debate of the campaign (moderated by Léa Salamé and Gilles Bouleau) to feature both major candidates was held. Polls conducted after the debate to ascertain which candidate performed best, showed that 59% of viewers thought that Macron had performed better, compared to 39% for Le Pen. The election brought together new alliances of protest movements, concerned with issues such as police brutality, racism, feminism and climate change, which held a large demonstration before the poll.

=== Candidates ===
Candidates in the second round
Emmanuel Macron	Marine Le Pen
La République En Marche!	National Rally
Incumbent; President of France (2017–present)	Member of the National Assembly for Pas-de-Calais (2017–present)

== Opinion polls ==
The trendlines below are constructed using local regressions.

== Results ==
Macron was re-elected with 58.55% of the vote to 41.45% for Le Pen in the second round of the election. Exit poll projections by Ipsos and Sopra Steria for France Télévisions and Radio France, released as voting closed, estimated that Macron defeated Le Pen with 58.2% of the vote to 41.8%. He became the first French president to win re-election since Jacques Chirac in 2002. The projections, based on actual ballot papers, also showed that 28% of registered voters did not show up to the second round, making it the lowest turnout since 1969. Official results showed that the turnout was 71.99%, with over 13 million abstentions in the second round, in addition to over 8.6% of ballots cast being blank or invalid (a marked increase over the first round).

Candidate	Party	First round		Second round	
Candidate	Party	Votes	%	Votes	%
Emmanuel Macron	La République En Marche!	9,783,058	27.85	18,768,639	58.55
Marine Le Pen	National Rally	8,133,828	23.15	13,288,686	41.45
Jean-Luc Mélenchon	La France Insoumise	7,712,520	21.95		
Éric Zemmour	Reconquête	2,485,226	7.07		
Valérie Pécresse	The Republicans	1,679,001	4.78		
Yannick Jadot	Europe Ecology – The Greens	1,627,853	4.63		
Jean Lassalle	Résistons!	1,101,387	3.13		
Fabien Roussel	French Communist Party	802,422	2.28		
Nicolas Dupont-Aignan	Debout la France	725,176	2.06		
Anne Hidalgo	Socialist Party	616,478	1.75		
Philippe Poutou	New Anticapitalist Party	268,904	0.77		
Nathalie Arthaud	Lutte Ouvrière	197,094	0.56		
Total		35,132,947	100.00	32,057,325	100.00
Valid votes		35,132,947	97.80	32,057,325	91.34
Invalid votes		247,151	0.69	805,249	2.29
Blank votes		543,609	1.51	2,233,904	6.37
Total votes		35,923,707	100.00	35,096,478	100.00
Registered voters/turnout		48,747,876	73.69	48,752,339	71.99
Source: Minister of the Interior

=== First round ===
==== Tables ====
Results by department
Department	Emmanuel Macron		Marine Le Pen		Jean-Luc Mélenchon		Éric Zemmour		Valérie Pécresse		Yannick Jadot		Jean Lassalle		Fabien Roussel		Nicolas Dupont-Aignan		Anne Hidalgo		Philippe Poutou		Nathalie Arthaud	
Department	Votes	%	Votes	%	Votes	%	Votes	%	Votes	%	Votes	%	Votes	%	Votes	%	Votes	%	Votes	%	Votes	%	Votes	%
Ain	92,206	27.69%	86,755	26.05%	57,832	17.37%	27,530	8.27%	17,572	5.28%	15,843	4.76%	10,876	3.27%	5,938	1.78%	8,998	2.70%	5,644	1.69%	2,172	0.65%	1,658	0.50%
Aisne	58,721	22.09%	104,342	39.25%	41,172	15.49%	18,266	6.87%	10,920	4.11%	7,074	2.66%	6,468	2.43%	5,968	2.24%	5,790	2.18%	2,983	1.12%	2,118	0.80%	2,038	0.77%
Allier	49,706	26.73%	50,315	27.06%	31,013	16.68%	12,361	6.65%	10,319	5.55%	5,982	3.22%	7,782	4.18%	8,119	4.37%	4,216	2.27%	3,280	1.76%	1,503	0.81%	1,359	0.73%
Alpes-de-Haute-Provence	20,800	21.51%	26,010	26.90%	21,856	22.61%	7,926	8.20%	3,834	3.97%	3,957	4.09%	4,309	4.46%	2,721	2.81%	2,504	2.59%	1,396	1.44%	865	0.89%	505	0.52%
Hautes-Alpes	20,507	23.78%	19,696	22.84%	19,718	22.87%	6,164	7.15%	4,511	5.23%	5,013	5.81%	3,871	4.49%	1,925	2.23%	2,142	2.48%	1,459	1.69%	801	0.93%	428	0.50%
Alpes-Maritimes	139,966	24.99%	149,219	26.64%	92,815	16.57%	78,329	13.99%	31,304	5.59%	23,419	4.18%	12,784	2.28%	8,883	1.59%	13,326	2.38%	5,424	0.97%	2,994	0.53%	1,630	0.29%
Ardèche	45,353	23.03%	49,594	25.18%	42,837	21.75%	14,199	7.21%	9,553	4.85%	8,544	4.34%	9,033	4.59%	5,710	2.90%	4,927	2.50%	4,189	2.13%	1,817	0.92%	1,219	0.62%
Ardennes	31,656	23.64%	48,242	36.02%	22,281	16.64%	8,771	6.55%	5,556	4.15%	3,446	2.57%	4,084	3.06%	3,009	2.25%	2,957	2.21%	1,741	1.30%	1,112	0.83%	1,081	0.81%
Ariège	18,070	19.71%	21,958	23.94%	23,908	26.07%	5,820	6.35%	2,724	2.97%	3,020	3.29%	7,532	8.21%	2,701	2.95%	1,621	1.77%	3,208	3.50%	723	0.79%	417	0.45%
Aube	38,321	25.60%	49,316	32.95%	22,483	15.02%	11,374	7.60%	8,923	5.96%	4,619	3.09%	3,787	2.53%	3,094	2.07%	3,966	2.65%	1,720	1.15%	1,062	0.71%	1,005	0.67%
Aude	43,104	20.29%	64,027	30.14%	42,039	19.79%	18,434	8.68%	7,350	3.46%	6,322	2.98%	12,382	5.83%	5,622	2.65%	4,206	1.98%	6,166	2.90%	1,748	0.82%	1,026	0.48%
Aveyron	47,430	27.75%	34,357	20.10%	32,734	19.15%	10,112	5.92%	9,988	5.84%	6,746	3.95%	14,825	8.67%	4,515	2.64%	3,477	2.03%	4,470	2.62%	1,354	0.79%	894	0.52%
Bouches-du-Rhône	229,038	22.71%	264,754	26.25%	237,971	23.59%	108,617	10.77%	36,228	3.59%	42,109	4.17%	24,256	2.40%	24,295	2.41%	20,051	1.99%	11,760	1.17%	5,963	0.59%	3,578	0.35%
Calvados	120,366	31.16%	91,774	23.76%	73,950	19.15%	22,255	5.76%	18,383	4.76%	19,641	5.09%	9,816	2.54%	8,777	2.27%	7,920	2.05%	6,848	1.77%	3,764	0.97%	2,757	0.71%
Cantal	25,038	28.42%	21,570	24.48%	12,944	14.69%	4,906	5.57%	6,987	7.93%	2,751	3.12%	6,848	7.77%	2,496	2.83%	1,547	1.76%	1,810	2.05%	650	0.74%	555	0.63%
Charente	53,126	27.57%	50,430	26.18%	37,305	19.36%	10,617	5.51%	8,343	4.33%	7,557	3.92%	8,482	4.40%	5,374	2.79%	4,345	2.26%	4,003	2.08%	1,763	0.92%	1,319	0.68%
Charente-Maritime	113,753	28.87%	99,790	25.32%	71,633	18.18%	24,347	6.18%	19,316	4.90%	19,012	4.82%	14,335	3.64	10,002	2.54%	9,289	2.36%	6,857	1.74%	3,403	0.86%	2,330	0.59%
Cher	43,497	27.10%	44,772	27.89%	27,901	17.38%	10,822	6.74%	8,147	5.07%	5,028	3.13%	5,495	3.42%	5,749	3.58%	3,770	2.35%	2,585	1.61%	1,463	0.91%	1,304	0.82%
Corrèze	33,125	23.23%	31,658	22.20%	27,731	19.45%	8,012	5.62%	12,278	8.61%	5,040	3.53%	10,177	7.14%	6,292	4.41%	2,618	1.84%	3,605	2.53%	1,179	0.83%	885	0.62%
Corse-du-Sud	13,022	18.76%	20,285	29.22%	9,412	13.56%	9,279	13.37%	3,808	5.48%	2,281	3.29%	6,807	9.80%	1,866	2.69%	1,226	1.77%	630	0.91%	612	0.88%	198	0.29%
Haute-Corse	13,773	17.54%	21,998	28.02%	10,367	13.20%	9,657	12.30%	5,555	7.08%	2,520	3.21%	8,601	10.96%	2,687	3.42%	1,374	1.75%	959	1.22%	762	0.97%	257	0.33%
Côte-d'Or	80,734	28.55%	69,110	24.44%	53,875	19.05%	21,651	7.66%	14,344	5.07%	13,462	4.76%	8,183	2.89%	5,721	2.02%	6,478	2.29%	5,126	1.81%	2,286	0.81%	1,775	0.63%
Côtes-d'Armor	113,656	31.02%	79,850	21.79%	74,226	20.26%	17,319	4.73%	17,235	4.70%	19,349	5.28%	11,949	3.26%	11,628	3.17%	6,404	1.75%	8,279	2.26%	3,895	1.06%	2,603	0.71%
Creuse	15,542	23.25%	16,772	25.09%	13,679	20.46%	3,501	5.24%	4,391	6.57%	1,906	2.85%	4,275	6.40%	2,430	3.64%	1,556	2.33%	1,641	2.45%	665	0.99%	490	0.73%
Dordogne	58,648	23.74%	63,498	25.70%	50,164	20.30%	15,815	6.40%	11,300	4.57%	8,582	3.47%	15,885	6.43%	8,877	3.59%	5,428	2.20%	5,374	2.17%	2,224	0.90%	1,295	0.52%
Doubs	76,338	27.55%	66,703	24.07%	55,587	20.06%	19,486	7.03%	15,107	5.45%	13,096	4.72%	8,688	3.14%	5,001	1.80%	7,775	2.81%	4,902	1.77%	2,345	0.85%	2,069	0.75%
Drôme	72,228	24.78%	70,574	24.22%	65,258	22.39%	22,010	7.55%	13,204	4.53%	14,234	4.88%	9,945	3.41%	6,752	2.32%	7,758	2.66%	5,311	1.82%	2,109	0.72%	2,041	0.70%
Eure	83,058	26.05%	102,952	32.29%	55,571	17.43%	20,930	6.56%	13,552	4.25%	11,477	3.60%	7,768	2.44%	7,056	2.21%	7,563	2.37%	4,027	1.26%	2,710	0.85%	2,197	0.69%
Eure-et-Loir	59,869	27.21%	61,960	28.16%	40,529	18.42%	14,803	6.73%	13,003	5.91%	7,904	3.59%	5,694	2.59%	4,267	1.94%	5,731	2.60%	3,076	1.40%	1,766	0.80%	1,419	0.64%
Finistère	174,894	32.21%	100,890	18.58%	116,591	21.47%	25,607	4.72%	26,541	4.89%	33,200	6.12%	18,320	3.37%	15,340	2.83%	8,566	1.58%	13,077	2.41%	6,266	1.15%	3,627	0.67%
Gard	88,278	21.32%	121,480	29.34%	88,827	21.46%	38,479	9.29%	15,460	3.73%	14,974	3.62%	15,162	3.66%	12,123	2.93%	8,137	1.97%	6,585	1.59%	2,706	0.65%	1,768	0.43%
Haute-Garonne	197,049	26.90%	133,411	18.21%	189,462	25.87%	50,699	6.92%	27,195	3.71%	42,711	5.83%	35,517	4.85%	16,338	2.23%	12,460	1.70%	19,700	2.69%	4,899	0.67%	3,015	0.41%
Gers	28,970	24.89%	26,015	22.35%	21,353	18.35%	8,396	7.21%	5,126	4.40%	4,090	3.51%	11,720	10.07%	3,128	2.69%	2,418	2.08%	3,861	3.32%	793	0.68%	529	0.45%
Gironde	256,179	28.72%	191,542	21.47%	194,775	21.84%	58,321	6.54%	37,575	4.21%	46,677	5.23%	37,725	4.23%	21,522	2.41%	15,693	1.76%	19,598	2.20%	8,734	0.98%	3,679	0.41%
Hérault	142,306	22.28%	165,734	25.95%	154,819	24.24%	57,751	9.04%	23,230	3.64%	28,057	4.39%	22,068	3.45%	14,165	2.22%	11,475	1.80%	12,150	1.90%	4,393	0.69%	2,580	0.40%
Ille-et-Vilaine	205,882	34.50%	101,797	17.06%	132,510	22.20%	27,463	4.60%	26,194	4.39%	42,613	7.14%	13,985	2.34%	12,696	2.13%	10,560	1.77%	13,973	2.34%	5,376	0.90%	3,783	0.63%
Indre	31,498	26.03%	34,516	28.53%	20,954	17.32%	7,438	6.15%	6,589	5.45%	3,726	3.08%	4,984	4.12%	3,702	3.06%	2,886	2.39%	2,464	2.04%	1,155	0.95%	1,085	0.90%
Indre-et-Loire	101,503	30.99%	70,553	21.54%	68,012	20.77%	19,931	6.09%	16,279	4.97%	16,245	4.96%	8,520	2.60%	7,835	2.39%	7,271	2.22%	6,216	1.90%	2,882	0.88%	2,243	0.68%
Isère	180,553	26.85%	154,889	23.03%	153,506	22.83%	47,463	7.06%	28,581	4.25%	40,387	6.01%	17,031	2.53%	14,699	2.19%	14,332	2.13%	12,737	1.89%	4,831	0.72%	3,479	0.52%
Jura	36,138	24.88%	38,177	26.29%	28,881	19.89%	9,657	6.65%	7,423	5.11%	6,388	4.40%	6,218	4.28%	3,166	2.18%	4,143	2.85%	2,635	1.81%	1,342	0.92%	1,053	0.73%
Landes	69,459	26.92%	58,646	22.73%	44,548	17.26%	16,817	6.52%	10,393	4.03%	8,628	3.34%	24,308	9.42%	8,176	3.17%	4,914	1.90%	9,071	3.52%	1,975	0.77%	1,115	0.43%
Loir-et-Cher	50,480	27.92%	50,212	27.77%	30,377	16.80%	12,703	7.03%	9,586	5.30%	7,097	3.93%	5,483	3.03%	4,507	2.49%	4,427	2.45%	3,165	1.75%	1,527	0.84%	1,246	0.69%
Loire	104,096	26.95%	97,846	25.33%	78,222	20.25%	28,728	7.44%	18,558	4.80%	16,672	4.32%	11,944	3.09%	9,018	2.33%	9,043	2.34%	6,973	1.81%	2,776	0.72%	2,391	0.62%
Haute-Loire	32,417	23.21%	38,629	27.66%	24,332	17.42%	9,529	6.82%	9,560	6.85%	5,796	4.16%	7,817	5.60%	3,493	2.50%	3,366	2.41%	2,491	1.78%	1,205	0.86%	1,020	0.73%
Loire-Atlantique	256,609	31.98%	135,702	16.91%	187,977	23.43%	42,761	5.33%	37,541	4.68%	60,072	7.49%	18,298	2.28%	18,322	2.38%	14,779	1.84%	18,369	2.29%	7,280	0.91%	4,712	0.59%
Loiret	97,004	28.92%	85,832	25.59%	63,486	18.93%	22,878	6.82%	18,086	5.39%	14,401	4.29%	8,483	2.53%	7,530	2.24%	7,674	2.29%	5,656	1.69%	2,433	0.73%	1,959	0.58%
Lot	27,311	24.97%	21,422	19.58%	25,932	23.71%	6,123	5.60%	5,648	5.16%	4,603	4.21%	8,032	7.34%	3,559	3.25%	2,400	2.19%	2,766	2.53%	976	0.89%	618	0.56%
Lot-et-Garonne	42,568	23.12%	50,290	27.32%	34,044	18.49%	15,646	8.50%	7,703	4.18%	5,686	3.09%	13,600	7.38%	4,970	2.70%	3,912	2.12%	3,357	1.82%	1,437	0.78%	889	0.48%
Lozère	10,739	22.85%	10,497	22.34%	9,153	19.48%	3,148	6.70%	3,039	6.46%	1,736	3.69%	4,722	10.05%	1,343	2.86%	913	1.94%	1,045	2.22%	426	0.91%	235	0.50%
Maine-et-Loire	157,063	35.59%	89,433	20.26%	80,616	18.27%	21,704	4.92%	21,538	4.88%	26,634	6.03%	11,036	2.50%	8,362	1.89%	9,420	2.13%	8,801	1.99%	3,663	0.83%	3,071	0.70%
Manche	92,642	32.57%	69,770	24.53%	46,940	16.50%	13,990	4.92%	14,746	5.18%	11,873	4.17%	9,421	3.31%	7,368	2.59%	6,886	2.42%	5,853	2.06%	2,720	0.96%	2,249	0.79%
Marne	78,472	28.63%	83,756	30.56%	42,858	15.64%	19,501	7.11%	14,357	5.24%	9,561	3.49%	6,921	2.52%	5,307	1.94%	6,159	2.25%	3,542	1.29%	1,894	0.69%	1,778	0.65%
Haute-Marne	21,886	23.33%	34,331	36.60%	13,228	14.10%	6,450	6.88%	4,841	5.16%	2,580	2.75%	3,327	3.55%	1,833	1.95%	2,584	2.75%	1,305	1.39%	747	0.80%	696	0.74%
Mayenne	60,755	36.40%	37,376	22.39%	25,608	15.34%	8,042	4.82%	9,236	5.53%	7,934	4.75%	4,673	2.80%	3,313	1.98%	3,858	2.31%	3,468	2.08%	1,372	0.82%	1,273	0.76%
Meurthe-et-Moselle	95,252	26.92%	97,243	27.49%	73,892	20.89%	23,518	6.65%	13,387	3.78%	14,588	4.12%	8,739	2.47%	7,961	2.25%	7,271	2.06%	6,362	1.80%	3,214	0.91	2,373	0.67%
Meuse	24,539	24.91%	34,588	35.11%	13,559	13.76%	7,347	7.46%	4,403	4.47%	3,130	3.18%	3,500	3.55%	1,957	1.99%	2,422	2.46%	1,483	1.51%	883	0.90%	702	0.71%
Morbihan	152,740	32.68%	102,856	22.01%	84,200	18.02%	26,595	5.69%	22,838	4.89%	27,036	5.78%	14,399	3.08%	11,529	2.47%	9,586	2.05%	8,267	1.77%	4,376	0.94%	2,952	0.63%
Moselle	136,366	26.01%	159,254	30.37%	100,159	19.10%	39,369	7.51%	19,300	3.68%	18,931	3.61%	14,163	2.70%	8,750	1.67%	12,651	2.41%	7,534	1.44%	4,343	0.83%	3,499	0.67%
Nièvre	28,686	25.51%	32,838	29.20%	19,930	17.72%	7,378	6.56%	5,172	4.60%	3,552	3.16%	4,106	3.65%	4,281	3.81%	2,495	2.22%	2,160	1.92%	1,010	0.90%	833	0.74%
Nord	336,138	26.37%	373,127	29.27%	279,785	21.95%	73,168	5.74%	42,470	3.33%	46,962	3.68%	22,459	1.76%	45,902	3.60%	20,617	1.62%	18,215	1.43%	8,265	0.65%	7,673	0.60%
Oise	100,388	24.30%	133,449	32.30%	79,648	19.28%	30,448	7.37%	17,508	4.24%	13,836	3.35%	9,205	2.23%	9,076	2.20%	9,420	2.28%	4,274	1.03%	3,060	0.74%	2,869	0.69%
Orne	46,005	30.48%	41,804	27.69%	22,993	15.23%	8,910	5.90%	8,838	5.85%	5,513	3.65%	4,895	3.24%	3,261	2.16%	3,826	2.53%	2,368	1.57%	1,334	0.88%	1,203	0.80%
Pas-de-Calais	194,649	24.61%	305,900	38.68%	124,759	15.77%	40,776	5.16%	25,320	3.20%	19,302	2.44%	17,019	2.15%	26,152	3.31%	13,975	1.77%	11,619	1.47%	5,491	0.69%	5,891	0.74%
Puy-de-Dôme	100,134	28.00%	78,182	21.86%	74,534	20.84%	20,624	5.77%	17,352	4.85%	17,029	4.76%	16,136	4.51%	12,713	3.56%	6,922	1.94%	8,216	2.30%	3,189	0.89%	2,556	0.71%
Pyrénées-Atlantiques	111,610	27.80%	69,768	17.38%	76,030	18.94%	25,877	6.45%	17,166	4.28%	19,967	4.97%	48,246	12.02%	10,170	2.53%	6,721	1.67%	9,276	2.31%	4,982	1.24%	1,677	0.42%
Hautes-Pyrénées	33,692	24.98%	29,938	22.19%	26,449	19.61%	8,714	6.46%	4,560	3.38%	4,872	3.61%	14,761	10.94%	4,539	3.37%	2,409	1.79%	3,315	2.46%	1,003	0.74%	636	0.47%
Pyrénées-Orientales	55,169	20.54%	87,930	32.74%	51,556	19.20%	24,782	9.23%	8,815	3.28%	8,588	3.20%	11,690	4.35%	6,509	2.42%	5,209	1.94%	5,013	1.87%	1,995	0.74%	1,312	0.49%
Bas-Rhin	177,069	30.70%	145,883	25.30%	105,055	18.22%	40,459	7.02%	24,812	4.30%	28,573	4.95%	14,655	2.54%	7,015	1.22%	17,009	2.95%	8,348	1.45%	4,158	0.72%	3,687	0.64%
Haut-Rhin	107,244	27.85%	106,930	27.77%	66,234	17.20%	30,282	7.86%	15,993	4.15%	18,963	4.92%	11,059	2.87%	4,649	1.21%	13,744	3.57%	4,881	1.27%	2,842	0.74%	2,265	0.59%
Rhône	278,243	30.61%	150,463	16.55%	229,035	25.20%	74,168	8.16%	50,263	5.53%	51,907	5.71%	17,572	1.93%	15,938	1.75%	16,487	1.81%	15,895	1.75%	5,267	0.58%	3,774	0.42%
Haute-Saône	30,204	22.42%	46,618	34.60%	21,089	15.65%	9,675	7.18%	6,754	5.01%	4,292	3.18%	4,820	3.58%	2,836	2.10%	3,640	2.70%	2,345	1.74%	1,295	0.96%	1,171	0.87%
Saône-et-Loire	82,633	27.61%	81,970	27.39%	52,336	17.49%	20,686	6.91%	15,210	5.08%	10,730	3.59%	10,186	3.40%	7,419	2.48%	7,745	2.59%	6,037	2.02%	2,369	0.79%	1,979	0.66%
Sarthe	83,876	28.24%	82,234	27.68%	54,244	18.26%	16,218	5.46%	15,937	5.36%	13,541	4.56%	7,546	2.54%	6,908	2.33%	6,494	2.19%	5,409	1.82%	2,505	0.84%	2,150	0.72%
Savoie	64,689	26.26%	56,733	23.03%	49,858	20.24%	18,045	7.32%	13,608	5.52%	15,642	6.35%	8,081	3.28%	5,536	2.25%	6,694	2.72%	4,418	1.79%	1,849	0.75%	1,205	0.49%
Haute-Savoie	130,422	30.53%	87,744	20.54%	78,062	18.28%	33,353	7.81%	22,349	5.23%	29,948	7.01%	13,371	3.13%	5,997	1.40%	14,175	3.32%	6,606	1.55%	3,232	0.76%	1,880	0.44%
Paris	372,820	35.34%	58,429	5.54%	317,472	30.08%	86,088	8.16%	69,564	6.59%	80,374	7.61%	12,139	1.15%	17,267	1.64%	9,591	0.91%	22,901	2.17%	5,732	0.54%	2,891	0.27%
Seine-Maritime	179,698	27.95%	177,806	27.65%	136,136	21.17%	33,361	5.19%	24,281	3.78%	24,785	3.85%	13,588	2.11%	19,896	3.09%	12,365	1.92%	11,139	1.73%	5,477	0.85%	4,433	0.69%
Seine-et-Marne	165,386	25.00%	155,897	23.57%	171,080	25.86%	47,935	7.25%	36,867	5.57%	26,754	4.04%	13,813	2.09%	12,851	1.94%	15,061	2.28%	7,858	1.19%	4,608	0.70%	3,446	0.52%
Yvelines	246,062	33.41%	101,398	13.77%	168,585	22.89%	64,407	8.74%	61,296	8.32%	40,470	5.49%	13,687	1.86%	11,721	1.59%	13,097	1.78%	9,046	1.23%	3,963	0.54%	2,774	0.38%
Deux-Sèvres	68,540	32.93%	47,979	23.05%	39,197	18.83%	8,813	4.23%	9,262	4.45%	10,088	4.85%	7,026	3.38%	4,545	2.18%	4,536	2.18%	4,348	2.09%	2,136	1.03%	1,645	0.79%
Somme	83,185	27.79%	98,208	32.81%	52,415	17.51%	16,908	5.65%	11,397	3.81%	8,050	2.69%	7,376	2.46%	7,716	2.58%	5,623	1.88%	3,755	1.25%	2,207	0.74%	2,500	0.84%
Tarn	53,925	23.46%	56,543	24.60%	48,430	21.07%	15,982	6.95%	10,014	4.36%	8,680	3.78%	17,010	7.40%	5,313	2.31%	5,123	2.23%	5,818	2.53%	1,829	0.80%	1,175	0.51%
Tarn-et-Garonne	31,737	21.76%	42,183	28.93%	27,881	19.12%	11,772	8.07%	5,994	4.11%	4,835	3.32%	9,573	6.56%	3,628	2.49%	3,412	2.34%	3,069	2.10%	1,057	0.72%	679	0.47%
Var	142,335	23.77%	183,287	30.61%	89,272	14.91%	79,329	13.25%	28,342	4.73%	21,044	3.51%	17,784	2.97%	10,672	1.78%	15,286	2.55%	5,703	0.95%	3,578	0.60%	2,098	0.35%
Vaucluse	66,883	22.01%	89,411	29.43%	63,045	20.75%	30,473	10.03%	11,918	3.92%	12,128	3.99%	9,843	3.24%	6,234	2.05%	6,895	2.27%	3,769	1.24%	2,023	0.67%	1,234	0.41%
Vendée	149,587	35.64%	97,280	23.18%	60,524	14.42%	25,663	6.11%	22,534	5.37%	19,753	4.71%	13,039	3.11%	8,153	1.94%	9,664	2.30%	7,244	1.73%	3,621	0.86%	2,647	0.63%
Vienne	67,831	29.28%	54,216	23.40%	49,162	21.22%	11,939	5.15%	9,959	4.30%	10,727	4.63%	7,741	3.34	6,412	2.77%	5,095	2.20%	4,542	1.96%	2,315	1.00%	1,715	0.74%
Haute-Vienne	54,951	27.19%	45,357	22.44%	43,137	21.34%	10,796	5.34%	9,544	4.72%	7,877	3.90%	9,973	4.93%	8,030	3.97%	3,555	1.76%	5,654	2.80%	1,787	0.88%	1,457	0.72%
Vosges	51,477	25.25%	65,676	32.22%	32,690	16.04%	13,195	6.47%	9,359	4.59%	7,569	3.71%	7,210	3.54%	3,850	1.89%	6,155	3.02%	3,115	1.53%	1,988	0.98%	1,572	0.77%
Yonne	42,616	24.14%	55,162	31.25%	31,600	17.90%	12,941	7.33%	9,322	5.28%	5,917	3.35%	5,356	3.03%	4,023	2.28%	4,594	2.60%	2,286	1.30%	1,487	0.84%	1,203	0.68%
Territoire de Belfort	16,768	24.07%	19,061	27.37%	14,601	20.96%	5,583	8.02%	3,322	4.77%	2,798	4.02%	2,000	2.87%	1,485	2.13%	1,821	2.61%	1,052	1.51%	603	0.87%	560	0.80%
Essonne	164,503	27.65%	105,862	17.79%	167,310	28.12%	39,284	6.60%	33,046	5.55%	29,562	4.97%	11,610	1.95%	13,480	2.27%	15,203	2.56%	7,944	1.34%	4,306	0.72%	2,831	0.48%
Hauts-de-Seine	287,494	37.11%	64,812	8.37%	199,640	25.77%	62,761	8.10%	62,231	8.03%	47,103	6.08%	11,260	1.45%	13,170	1.70%	9,746	1.26%	10,518	1.36%	3,704	0.48%	2,306	0.30%
Seine-Saint-Denis	110,117	20.27%	64,542	11.88%	266,630	49.09%	27,968	5.15%	17,479	3.22%	19,352	3.56%	6,805	1.25%	11,642	2.14%	6,300	1.16%	5,890	1.08%	3,662	0.67%	2,756	0.51%
Val-de-Marne	171,409	29.10%	69,599	11.82%	192,427	32.67%	43,430	7.37%	32,522	5.52%	31,904	5.42%	8,944	1.52%	14,954	2.54%	9,359	1.59%	8,276	1.40%	3,730	0.63%	2,504	0.43%
Val-d'Oise	138,166	26.09%	91,081	17.20%	175,666	33.17%	37,564	7.09%	26,403	4.99%	20,710	3.91%	9,101	1.72%	10,060	1.90%	8,996	1.70%	6,094	1.15%	3,352	0.63%	2,392	0.45%
Guadeloupe	18,137	13.43%	24,204	17.92%	75,862	56.16%	3,098	2.29%	3,979	2.95%	1,927	1.43%	1,033	0.76%	668	0.49%	2,114	1.56%	2,266	1.68%	713	0.53%	1,084	0.80%
Martinique	20,043	16.30%	16,495	13.42%	65,292	53.10%	3,153	2.56%	4,731	3.85%	1,978	1.61%	1,162	0.95%	747	0.61%	2,989	2.43%	3,935	3.20%	977	0.79%	1,447	1.18%
French Guiana	5,101	14.22%	6,334	17.66%	18,143	50.59%	1,573	4.39%	997	2.78%	940	2.62%	516	1.44%	246	0.69%	717	2.00%	535	1.49%	462	1.29%	297	0.83%
Réunion	62,542	18.04%	85,770	24.73%	139,604	40.26%	13,070	3.77%	9,738	2.81%	7,994	2.31%	4,844	1.40%	3,074	0.89%	8,338	2.40%	5,549	1.60%	2,705	0.78%	3,538	1.02%
Mayotte	5,936	16.94%	14,958	42.68%	8,398	23.96%	482	1.38%	2,810	8.02%	295	0.84%	359	1.02%	206	0.59%	530	1.51%	318	0.91%	328	0.94%	430	1.23%
New Caledonia	28,561	40.51%	13,273	18.83%	9,711	13.77%	6,435	9.13%	4,144	5.88%	2,161	3.07%	1,031	1.46%	399	0.57%	2,697	3.83%	963	1.37%	560	0.79%	565	0.80%
French Polynesia	24,418	40.25%	11,797	19.45%	8,035	13.24%	4,311	7.11%	4,809	7.93%	2,166	3.57%	618	1.02%	376	0.62%	1,983	3.27%	874	1.44%	459	0.76%	819	1.35%
Saint Pierre and Miquelon	534	19.77%	459	16.99%	1,105	40.91%	80	2.96%	51	1.89%	116	4.29%	108	4.00%	19	0.70%	82	3.04%	75	2.78%	50	1.85%	22	0.81%
Wallis and Futuna	2,115	39.47%	579	10.80%	501	9.35%	118	2.20%	1,354	25.27%	72	1.34%	78	1.46%	34	0.63%	244	4.55%	118	2.20%	48	0.90%	98	1.83%
Saint Martin/Saint Barthélemy	2,070	24.74%	1,445	17.27%	2,354	28.13%	1,107	13.23%	354	4.23%	247	2.95%	208	2.49%	48	0.57%	339	4.05%	92	1.10%	63	0.75%	41	0.49%
French residents overseas	224,957	45.09%	26,380	5.29%	109,394	21.92%	43,252	8.67%	20,956	4.20%	40,774	8.17%	5,964	1.20%	3,266	0.65%	7,074	1.22%	12,489	2.50%	3,145	0.63%	1,300	0.26%
Total	9783058	27.85%	8133828	23.15%	7712520	21.95%	2485226	7.07%	1679001	4.78%	1627853	4.63%	1101387	3.13%	802422	2.28%	725176	2.06%	616478	1.75%	268904	0.77%	197094	0.56%
Source: Ministry of Interior

Results by region
Region	Emmanuel Macron		Marine Le Pen		Jean-Luc Mélenchon		Éric Zemmour		Valérie Pécresse		Yannick Jadot		Jean Lassalle		Fabien Roussel		Nicolas Dupont-Aignan		Anne Hidalgo		Philippe Poutou		Nathalie Arthaud	
Region	Votes	%	Votes	%	Votes	%	Votes	%	Votes	%	Votes	%	Votes	%	Votes	%	Votes	%	Votes	%	Votes	%	Votes	%
Auvergne-Rhône-Alpes	1,175,085	27.75%	943,294	22.28%	897,433	21.20%	312,916	7.39%	217,906	5.15%	224,735	5.31%	136,436	3.22%	96,409	2.28%	98,465	2.33%	77,570	1.83%	30,596	0.72%	23,137	0.55%
Bourgogne-Franche-Comté	394,117	26.31%	409,639	27.35%	277,899	18.56%	107,057	7.15%	76,654	5.12%	60,235	4.02%	49,557	3.31%	33,932	2.27%	38,691	2.58%	26,543	1.77%	12,737	0.85%	10,643	0.71%
Brittany	647,172	32.79%	385,393	19.53%	407,527	20.65%	96,984	4.91%	92,808	4.70%	122,198	6.19%	58,653	2.97%	51,193	2.59%	35,116	1.78%	43,596	2.21%	19,913	1.01%	12,965	0.66%
Centre-Val de Loire	383,851	28.53%	347,845	25.86%	251,259	18.68%	88,575	6.58%	71,690	5.33%	54,401	4.04%	38,659	2.87%	33,590	2.50%	31,759	2.36%	23,162	1.72%	11,226	0.83%	9,256	0.69%
Corsica	26,795	18.11%	42,283	28.58%	19,779	13.37%	18,936	12.80%	9,363	6.33%	4,801	3.25%	15,408	10.42%	4,553	3.08%	2,600	1.76%	1,589	1.08%	1,374	0.93%	455	0.31%
Grand Est	762,282	27.28%	825,219	29.54%	492,439	17.63%	200,265	7.17%	120,931	4.33%	111,960	4.01%	77,442	2.77%	47,425	1.70%	74,918	2.68%	40,031	1.43%	22,243	0.80%	18,658	0.67%
Hauts-de-France	773,221	25.40%	1,015,361	33.35%	577,878	18.98%	179,606	5.90%	107,631	3.53%	95,234	3.13%	62,548	2.05%	94,831	3.11%	55,439	1.82%	40,856	1.34%	21,150	0.69%	20,977	0.69%
Île-de-France	1,656,341	30.19%	711,690	12.97%	1,659,152	30.24%	409,532	7.47%	339,468	6.19%	296,229	5.40%	87,372	1.59%	105,170	1.92%	87,360	1.59%	78,561	1.43%	33,063	0.60%	21,907	0.40%
Normandy	521,769	29.26%	484,106	27.14%	335,590	18.82%	99,446	5.58%	79,800	4.47%	73,289	4.11%	45,488	2.55%	46,358	2.60%	38,560	2.16%	30,235	1.70%	16,005	0.90%	12,839	0.72%
Nouvelle-Aquitaine	945,332	27.63%	779,948	22.80%	681,405	19.92%	210,501	6.15%	157,230	4.60%	151,747	4.44%	201,773	5.90%	96,800	2.83%	67,662	1.98%	77,326	2.26%	32,600	0.95%	18,496	0.54%
Occitanie	777,780	23.48%	815,495	24.62%	742,543	22.42%	260,212	7.86%	129,143	3.90%	139,234	4.20%	184,994	5.59%	83,483	2.52%	63,260	1.91%	77,166	2.33%	23,902	0.72%	14,884	0.45%
Pays de la Loire	707,890	33.27%	442,025	20.78%	408,969	19.22%	114,388	5.38%	106,786	5.02%	127,934	6.01%	54,592	2.57%	45,058	2.12%	44,215	2.08%	43,291	2.03%	18,441	0.87%	13,853	0.65%
Provence-Alpes-Côte d'Azur	619,529	23.34%	732,377	27.59%	524,677	19.77%	310,838	11.71%	116,137	4.38%	107,670	4.06%	72,847	2.74%	54,730	2.06%	60,204	2.27%	29,511	1.11%	16,224	0.61%	9,473	0.36%
Guadeloupe	18,137	13.43%	24,204	17.92%	75,862	56.16%	3,098	2.29%	3,979	2.95%	1,927	1.43%	1,033	0.76%	668	0.49%	2,114	1.56%	2,266	1.68%	713	0.53%	1,084	0.80%
Martinique	20,043	16.30%	16,495	13.42%	65,292	53.10%	3,153	2.56%	4,731	3.85%	1,978	1.61%	1,162	0.95%	747	0.61%	2,989	2.43%	3,935	3.20%	977	0.79%	1,447	1.18%
French Guiana	5,101	14.22%	6,334	17.66%	18,143	50.59%	1,573	4.39%	997	2.78%	940	2.62%	516	1.44%	246	0.69%	717	2.00%	535	1.49%	462	1.29%	297	0.83%
Réunion	62,542	18.04%	85,770	24.73%	139,604	40.26%	13,070	3.77%	9,738	2.81%	7,994	2.31%	4,844	1.40%	3,074	0.89%	8,338	2.40%	5,549	1.60%	2,705	0.78%	3,538	1.02%
Mayotte	5,936	16.94%	14,958	42.68%	8,398	23.96%	482	1.38%	2,810	8.02%	295	0.84%	359	1.02%	206	0.59%	530	1.51%	318	0.91%	328	0.94%	430	1.23%
Total	9783058	27.85%	8133828	23.15%	7712520	21.95%	2485226	7.07%	1679001	4.78%	1627853	4.63%	1101387	3.13%	802422	2.28%	725176	2.06%	616478	1.75%	268904	0.77%	197094	0.56%
Source: Ministry of Interior

==== Maps ====
===== Nationwide =====
Simplified map of the first round

Second-placed candidate by department in the first round

Results of the first round by parliamentary constituency

Results of the first round by municipality

Results of the first round among the French diaspora

===== By region =====
Results of the first round in Saint Barthélemy (top left) and Saint Martin (bottom right)

Results of the first round in Saint Pierre and Miquelon by commune

===== By city =====
Results of the first round in Petite Couronne (Grand Paris) by commune

=== Second round ===
==== Tables ====
Results by department
Department	Emmanuel Macron		Marine Le Pen	
Department	Votes	%	Votes	%
Ain	166,635	54.99%	136,370	45.01%
Aisne	102,428	40.09%	153,069	59.91%
Allier	87,645	52.35%	79,761	47.65%
Alpes-de-Haute-Provence	41,657	48.55%	44,139	51.45%
Hautes-Alpes	42,209	55.06%	34,446	44.94%
Alpes-Maritimes	261,987	50.13%	260,627	49.87%
Ardèche	90,254	52.40%	82,001	47.60%
Ardennes	55,085	43.34%	72,026	56.66%
Ariège	39,297	51.09%	37,616	48.91%
Aube	68,830	48.32%	73,630	51.68%
Aude	85,464	45.10%	104,038	54.90%
Aveyron	89,953	60.07%	59,789	39.93%
Bouches-du-Rhône	481,129	52.08%	442,759	47.92%
Calvados	218,571	60.29%	143,955	39.71%
Cantal	45,054	56.07%	35,301	43.93%
Charente	95,654	55.06%	78,085	44.94%
Charente-Maritime	201,159	56.32%	156,020	43.68%
Cher	77,739	52.56%	70,160	47.44%
Corrèze	68,272	55.78%	54,131	44.22%
Corse-du-Sud	26,160	41.69%	36,595	58.31%
Haute-Corse	29,951	42.13%	41,137	57.87%
Côte-d'Or	144,548	57.27%	107,866	42.73%
Côtes-d'Armor	209,856	62.90%	123,798	37.10%
Creuse	30,552	52.04%	28,152	47.96%
Dordogne	111,480	51.52%	104,894	48.48%
Doubs	141,916	57.16%	106,347	42.84%
Drôme	143,696	55.72%	114,216	44.28%
Eure	146,750	48.62%	155,085	51.38%
Eure-et-Loir	109,744	53.29%	96,185	46.71%
Finistère	332,396	67.50%	160,073	32.50%
Gard	177,662	47.85%	193,659	52.15%
Haute-Garonne	409,932	64.42%	226,450	35.58%
Gers	57,115	55.66%	45,490	44.34%
Gironde	484,771	61.37%	305,112	38.63%
Hérault	297,211	52.57%	268,098	47.43%
Ille-et-Vilaine	390,332	70.94%	159,930	29.06%
Indre	57,574	51.41%	54,410	48.59%
Indre-et-Loire	189,230	62.66%	112,770	37.34%
Isère	359,685	59.80%	241,749	40.20%
Jura	68,843	53.07%	60,882	46.93%
Landes	128,771	56.54%	98,982	43.46%
Loir-et-Cher	91,359	53.81%	78,433	46.19%
Loire	194,878	56.64%	149,174	43.36%
Haute-Loire	62,372	50.16%	61,979	49.84%
Loire-Atlantique	492,422	69.20%	219,198	30.80%
Loiret	180,882	57.57%	133,331	42.43%
Lot	55,130	59.18%	38,031	40.82%
Lot-et-Garonne	81,345	49.53%	82,874	50.47%
Lozère	22,064	54.20%	18,644	45.80%
Maine-et-Loire	274,810	66.53%	138,259	33.47%
Manche	159,814	59.61%	108,292	40.39%
Marne	136,054	52.10%	125,074	47.90%
Haute-Marne	38,226	43.04%	50,581	56.96%
Mayenne	102,263	64.21%	57,006	35.79%
Meurthe-et-Moselle	179,248	54.42%	150,156	45.58%
Meuse	41,933	44.39%	52,527	55.61%
Morbihan	269,755	62.81%	159,717	37.19%
Moselle	249,589	50.46%	245,060	49.54%
Nièvre	50,698	49.89%	50,923	50.11%
Nord	634,038	52.85%	565,762	47.15%
Oise	182,791	47.27%	203,865	52.73%
Orne	79,267	55.11%	64,559	44.89%
Pas-de-Calais	324,144	42.51%	438,390	57.49%
Puy-de-Dôme	188,468	60.16%	124,825	39.84%
Pyrénées-Atlantiques	219,766	63.05%	128,779	36.95%
Hautes-Pyrénées	65,085	55.50%	52,182	44.50%
Pyrénées-Orientales	106,188	43.68%	136,922	56.32%
Bas-Rhin	320,198	58.96%	222,838	41.04%
Haut-Rhin	191,814	52.90%	170,777	47.10%
Rhône	551,544	68.66%	251,720	31.34%
Haute-Saône	53,568	43.10%	70,720	56.90%
Saône-et-Loire	144,989	53.33%	126,860	46.67%
Sarthe	154,909	55.41%	124,658	44.59%
Savoie	125,770	57.62%	92,487	42.38%
Haute-Savoie	237,506	61.66%	147,694	38.34%
Paris	808,996	85.10%	141,591	14.90%
Seine-Maritime	332,139	55.28%	268,688	44.72%
Seine-et-Marne	329,771	56.98%	249,014	43.02%
Yvelines	464,910	71.05%	189,474	28.95%
Deux-Sèvres	117,805	62.13%	71,791	37.87%
Somme	109,415	45.37%	131,773	54.63%
Tarn	106,768	53.06%	94,441	46.94%
Tarn-et-Garonne	62,503	47.98%	67,770	52.02%
Var	252,723	44.90%	310,126	55.10%
Vaucluse	134,475	48.00%	145,705	52.00%
Vendée	244,494	61.86%	150,772	38.14%
Vienne	125,174	60.12%	83,050	39.88%
Haute-Vienne	103,329	59.18%	71,263	40.82%
Vosges	91,555	47.59%	100,839	52.41%
Yonne	78,038	48.41%	83,169	51.59%
Territoire de Belfort	31,987	51.44%	30,202	48.56%
Essonne	338,567	65.43%	178,906	34.57%
Hauts-de-Seine	552,124	80.39%	134,685	19.61%
Seine-Saint-Denis	326,038	73.72%	116,223	26.28%
Val-de-Marne	376,204	74.48%	128,873	25.52%
Val-d'Oise	299,829	66.15%	153,446	33.85%
Guadeloupe	40,229	30.40%	92,106	69.60%
Martinique	46,918	39.13%	73,000	60.87%
French Guiana	14,073	39.30%	21,734	60.70%
Réunion	147,270	40.43%	217,021	59.57%
Mayotte	15,707	40.90%	22,694	59.10%
New Caledonia	43,794	61.04%	27,958	38.96%
French Polynesia	42,890	51.80%	39,913	48.20%
Saint Pierre and Miquelon	1,243	49.31%	1,278	50.69%
Wallis and Futuna	3,830	67.44%	1,849	32.56%
Saint Martin/Saint Barthélemy	3,850	44.58%	4,787	55.42%
French residents overseas	458,874	86.14%	73,830	13.86%
Total	18,768,639	58.55%	13,288,686	41.45%
Source: Minister of the Interior

Results by region
Region	Emmanuel Macron		Marine Le Pen	
Region	Votes	%	Votes	%
Auvergne-Rhône-Alpes	2,253,507	59.76%	1,517,277	40.24%
Bourgogne-Franche-Comté	714,587	52.87%	636,969	47.13%
Brittany	1,202,339	66.58%	603,518	33.42%
Centre-Val de Loire	706,528	56.44%	545,289	43.56%
Corsica	56,111	41.92%	77,732	58.08%
Grand Est	1,372,519	52.07%	1,263,522	47.93%
Hauts-de-France	1,384,266	47.87%	1,507,755	52.13%
Île-de-France	3,496,439	73.02%	1,292,212	26.98%
Normandy	936,541	55.84%	740,579	44.16%
Nouvelle-Aquitaine	1,768,079	58.33%	1,263,134	41.67%
Occitanie	1,574,372	53.96%	1,343,130	46.04%
Pays de la Loire	1,268,898	64.78%	689,893	35.22%
Provence-Alpes-Côte d'Azur	1,214,180	49.52%	1,237,802	50.48%
Guadeloupe	40,229	30.40%	92,106	69.60%
Martinique	46,918	39.13%	73,000	60.87%
French Guiana	14,073	39.30%	21,734	60.70%
Réunion	147,270	40.43%	217,021	59.57%
Mayotte	15,707	40.90%	22,694	59.10%
French residents overseas	458,874	86.14%	73,830	13.86%
Source: Minister of the Interior

==== Maps ====
===== Nationwide =====
Simplified map of the second round

Results of the second round by parliamentary constituency

Results of the second round by commune

===== By region =====
Results of the second round in French Guiana by commune

Results of the second round in French Polynesia by commune

Results of the second round in Guadeloupe by commune

Results of the second round in Martinique by commune

Results of the second round in Mayotte by commune

Results of the second round in New Caledonia by commune

Results of the second round in Réunion by commune

Results of the second round in Saint Barthélemy (top left) and Saint Martin (bottom right)

Results of the second round in Saint Pierre and Miquelon by commune

== Aftermath ==
The New York Times commented that the race was much closer than in 2017, when Macron won 66.1% of the vote to Le Pen's 33.9%, but that Macron's margin was wider than expected prior to the election. Le Pen conceded defeat minutes after the estimated results were released, but still called the outcome a victory for her political movement and for the upcoming parliamentary elections. It was the best result for the far right in France since the founding of the Fifth French Republic in 1958.

Olivier Véran, Minister for Solidarity and Health, stated that the government has "heard the French people's message", referring to the increasing number of votes for the far-right, and that "there will be a change of method". Macron reflected on the results of the elections self-critically, assuming that many voters voted for him to counter the far right rather than in support of his political positions. Macron was congratulated by several world leaders on his re-election, with his first call coming from German chancellor Olaf Scholz.

== See also ==
- President of France
- Politics of France
- French presidential elections under the Fifth Republic
