= Walwari =

Political party in French Guiana

- Secretary-General: Line Létard
- Founders: Christiane Taubira; Roland Delannon
- Founded: 30 November 1992
- Ideology: Democratic socialism Social democracy Autonomism
- Political position: Centre-left to left-wing
- National affiliation: New Popular Front (2024–present)
- National Assembly: 0 / 577
- Senate: 0 / 348
- European Parliament: 0 / 79
- Assembly of French Guiana: 0 / 55

Walwari (French pronunciation: [wal.wa.ʁi]) is a political party in the French overseas department and region of French Guiana, founded in 1992 by Christiane Taubira and her husband Roland Delannon.

== Representation ==
The party had one seat in the French National Assembly in the group of the Socialist Party (PS); it was held by Taubira from 1993 to 2012 who also served as a Member of the European Parliament (MEP) from 1994 to 1999. It is aligned with the Radical Party of the Left (PRG) and has arranged local electoral alliances with the radical independentist Decolonization and Social Emancipation Movement (MDES).
