= List of French Guianans =

This is a list of notable people from French Guiana which includes people who were born in French Guiana and people who contributed to the culture of the territory of French Guiana.

== Culture ==
- Alicia Aylies (born 1998), model from French Guiana.
- Eddy Gaumont (1946 - 1971), jazz musician from French Guiana.
- Fanny J (born 1987), singer born in French Guiana.
- Edith Lefel (1963 - 2003), French singer born in French Guiana.
- Édouard Montoute (born 1970), actor born in French Guiana.
- Henri Salvador (1917 - 2008), musician born in French Guiana.

=== Writers and intellectuals ===
- Constant Bar (1817 - 1884), entomologist from French Guiana.
- Léon Damas (1912 - 1978), French Guianan writer, born in Cayenne.
- Jean-Jacques de Granville (1943 - 2022), botanist and researcher from French Guiana.
- Ismael Urbain (1812 - 1884), French journalist and interpreter born in Cayenne.
- Sylviane Vayaboury (born 1960), French writer born in Cayenne.

== Entrepreneurs ==
- Suzanne Amomba Paillé (c. 1673-1683 - 1755), French Guianan former slave, planter and philanthropist.

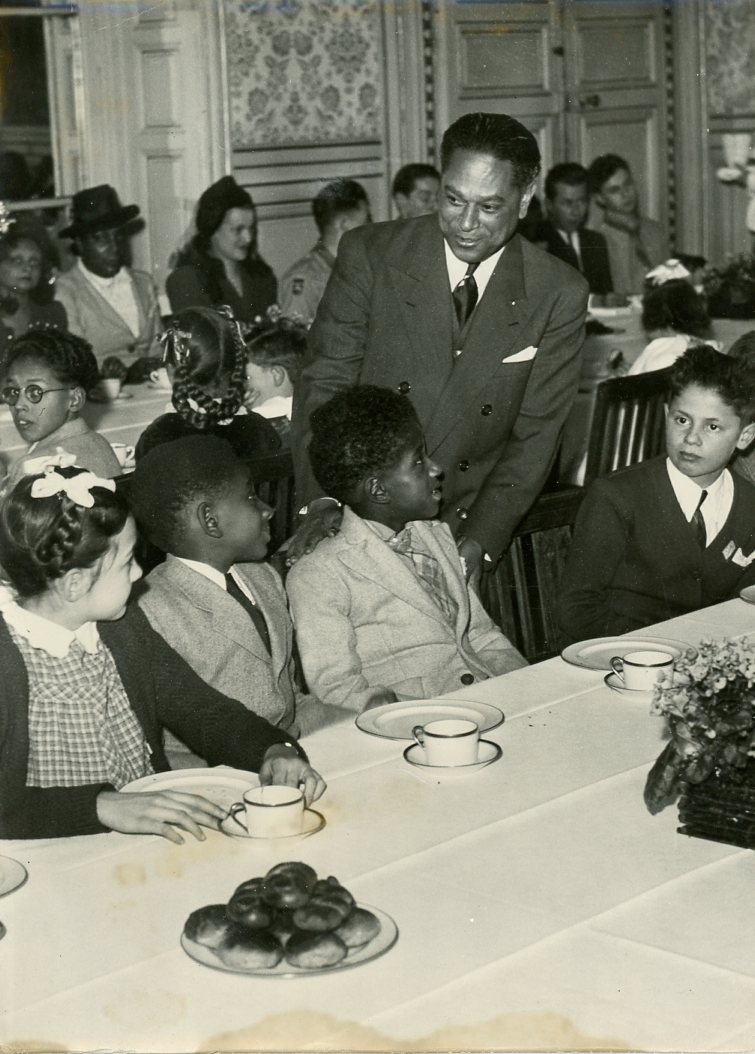
Gaston Monnerville with children in 1947.

== Political leaders ==
- Lénaïck Adam (born 1992), French Guianan politician.
- Rodolphe Alexandre (born 1953), politician in French Guiana.
- Apatou (c. 1833 - 1908), leader of the Aluku Maroons in French Guiana.
- Jean-Étienne Antoinette (born 1966), French Guianan politician.
- Chantal Berthelot (born 1958), French Guianan politician.
- Léon Bertrand (born 1951), French mayor from Saint-Laurent-du-Maroni.
- Paulin Bruné (1946), politician from French Guiana.
- Élie Castor (1943 - 1996), politician from French Guiana.
- Jean-Victor Castor (born 1962), French Guianan politician.
- Justin Catayée (1916 - 1962), anti-colonial politician born in French Guiana.
- Félix Éboué (1884 - 1944), colonial administrator born in Cayenne.
- Édouard Gaumont (1915 - 2008), French lawyer and leader, born in Cayenne.
- Léopold Héder (1918 - 1978), French politician born in Cayenne.
- René Jadfard (1899 - 1947), French politician born in Cayenne.
- Oriane Jean-François (born 2001), footballer from French Guiana.
- Antoine Karam (born 1950), French Guianan politician.
- Gaston Monnerville (1897 - 1991), politician and lawyer from French Guiana.
- Pierre Monnerville (1895 - 1970), politician born in French Guiana.
- Georges Othily (1944 - 2017), French Guianan politician.
- Georges Patient (born 1949), French Guianan politician.
- Jules Patient (1905 - 1985), French Guianan politician.
- Hector Riviérez (1913 - 2003), French Guianan politician.
- Davy Rimane (born 1979), French Guianan politician.
- Juliana Rimane (born 1959), French Guianan politician.
- Gabriel Serville (1959 - 2026), French Guianan politician.
- Raymond Tarcy (1936 - 2019), politician from Saint-Laurent-du Maroni.
- Christiane Taubira (born 1952), French politician born in Cayenne.
- Jean-Marie Taubira (born 1950), French politician. born in Cayenne.
- Alain Tien-Liong (born 1963), French Guianian politician.

== Religion ==
- Emmanuel Marie Philippe Louis Lafont (born 1945), Roman Catholic bishop serving in French Guiana.

== Sports ==
- Arnold Abelinti (born 1991), footballer from French Guiana.
- Alexie Alaïs (born 1994), French athlete born in Kourou.
- Sylvain Atieda (born 1996), footballer born in French Guiana.
- Ludovic Baal (born 1986), footballer from French Guiana.
- Roy Contout (born 1985), footballer from French Guiana.
- Jean-Claude Darcheville (born 1975), footballer born in Sinnamary.
- Raoul Diagne (1910 - 2002), footballer from French Guiana.
- Odsonne Édouard (born 1998), footballer born in Kourou.
- Alex Éric (born 1990), footballer from French Guiana.
- Rhudy Evens (born 1988), footballer born in Kourou.
- Simon Falette (born 1992), French footballer who plays for French Guiana.
- Marc-Antoine Fortuné (born 1981), footballer born in French Guiana.
- Jules Haabo (born 1997), French Guianan footballer.
- Florian Jozefzoon (born 1991), footballer born in Saint-Laurent-du-Maroni.
- Jaïr Karam (born 1976), French Guianan football manager.
- Laurent Lopes (born 1997), footballer born in Kourou.
- Lanroy Machine (born 2006), footballer from French Guiana.
- Mike Maignan (born 1995), footballer born in Cayenne.
- Florent Malouda (born 1980), football coach and player born in French Guiana.
- Lesly Malouda (born 1983), French Guianan footballer.
- Stéphane Martine (born 1978), footballer from French Guiana.
- Jean-Marc Pansa (born 1997), French Guianan basketballer.
- Claire Pontlevoy (born 2003), French gymnast born in Kourou.
- Loïc Prévot (born 1998), sprinter from French Guiana.
- Cyrille Regis (1958 - 2018), footballer born in French Guiana.
- Jean-Clair Todibo (born 1999), footballer born in Cayenne.
- Marvin Torvic (born 1988), footballer born in Sinnamary.
- Jacobin Yoma (born 1966), boxer from French Guiana.

== See also ==
- French Guiana
- List of Eastern Caribbean people
