= List of senators of French Guiana =

Location of French Guiana in France

Following is a list of senators of French Guiana, people who have represented the department of French Guiana in the Senate of France.

== Fourth Republic ==
Senators for French Guiana under the French Fourth Republic were:

Period	Name	Notes
1948–1952	Jules Patient	
1952–1959	Auguste Boudinot	

== Fifth Republic ==
Senators for French Guiana under the French Fifth Republic were:

Period	Name	Party	Notes
1959-1962	Georges Guéril	Union for the New Republic (UNR)	
1962-1971	Robert Vignon	Union for the New Republic (UNR)	
1971-1978	Léopold Héder	Socialist Party (PS)	Died in office
1978-1980	Henri Agarande	Socialist Party (PS)	Replaced Léopold Héder
1980-1989	Raymond Tarcy	Socialist Party (PS)	
1989-2008	Georges Othily	Socialist Party (PS)	
2008-2014	Jean-Étienne Antoinette	Socialist Party (PS)	
from 2008	Georges Patient	Socialist Party (PS)	
from 2014	Antoine Karam	Guianese Socialist Party (PSG)	

== Sources ==
- Liste des anciens sénateurs de la IVème République par circonscription (in French), Sénat de France
- Liste des anciens sénateurs de la Vème République par circonscription (in French), Sénat de France
- Liste par département -Guyane (in French), Sénat de France
