= Elections in French Guiana =

French Guiana elects a legislature on the regional and departmental level. The legislature consists of two councils with diverging powers. The Regional Council (Conseil régional), is one of the four French Overseas Departments along with Guadeloupe, Martinique, and Réunion. The four departments were upgraded from territorial political status in 1946 and they gained the right to regional councils along with all metropolitan France in January 1974. The Regional Council has 31 members, elected for a four-year term by proportional representation. The General Council(Conseil général) has members elected for a six-year term in single-seat constituencies. French Guiana has a multi-party system, with numerous parties in which no one party often has a chance of gaining power alone, and parties must work with each other to form coalition governments.

== Last elections ==
=== 2004 regional elections ===
Candidate	Party	Votes (Round One)	% (Round One)	Votes (Round Two)	% (Round Two)
Antoine Karam	PSG	6,087	22.45%	11,380	37.24%
Léon Bertrand	UMP	6,595	24.32%	9,650	31.58%
Georges Othily	FDG	5,238	19.31%	9,529	31.18%
Christiane Taubira	Walwari-PRG	4,875	17.98%	-	-
Maurice Pindard	MDES	1,777	6.55%	-	-
Brigitte Wyngaarde	The Greens	1,316	4.85%	-	-
Gladys Robin	Miscellaneous	700	2.58%	-	-
Léon Jean-Baptiste-Edouard	PSG dissident	531	1.96%	-	-
Total		27,119	100.00%	30,559	100.00%

==== Seats ====
Party		seats
•	Guianese Socialist Party	29
	Union for a Popular Movement	7
	Walwari	7

== Past elections ==
=== 1998 regional election ===
Party		seats
•	Guianese Socialist Party	11
	Democratic Forces of Guiana	9
	Rally for the Republic	6
	Decolonization and Social Emancipation Movement	3
	Walwari	2

=== 1992 regional election ===
Party		seats
•	Guianese Socialist Party	26
	Miscellaneous Right	3
	Rally for the Republic	2

=== 1986 regional election ===
Party		seats
•	Guianese Socialist Party	15
	Rally for the Republic	9
	Miscellaneous Left	4
	Decolonization and Social Emancipation Movement	3

== See also ==
- Electoral calendar
- Electoral system
