= Guianese Socialist Party =

Guianese Socialist Party Parti socialiste guyanais
- General Secretary: Marie-Josée Lalsie
- Founder: Justin Catayée
- Founded: February 1956
- Split from: SFIO
- Ideology: Democratic socialism Social democracy Autonomism
- Political position: Centre-left
- National affiliation: Socialists and affiliated group
- National Assembly: 0 / 577
- Senate: 0 / 348
- European Parliament: 0 / 74
- Guianese Assembly: 0 / 55

Website
- partisocialisteguyanais.com

The Guianese Socialist Party (French: Parti socialiste guyanais, PSG) is a socialist political party in the French overseas region of French Guiana, in South America.

== History ==
It was founded in 1956 by Justin Catayée, beforehand the founder of the Guianese federation of the French Section of the Workers' International (SFIO). It is a separate party, not to be confused with the departmental federation of the French Socialist Party. For instance, the PSG endorsed the overseas list of Europe Ecology – The Greens, not the PS one, in the 2004 European elections.

The PSG candidate Gabriel Serville won one of the two parliamentary seats for French Guiana at the French National Assembly in 2012, the second one was held in 2007-2017 by a non-PSG deputy, Chantal Berthelot, endorsed by various parties, among whom the PSG.

The PSG was until 2010 a major party in the regional council of French Guiana, when it fell from 17 seats to one out of 31. It controls since then only the Cayenne municipality. The PSG didn't compete as such for the December 2015 first Guianese Assembly elections after the merger of the department and the region, and the coalition list it supported, headed by deputy Chantal Berthelot from another left-wing party, got only 8.49% and was eliminated at the first round.

Rodolphe Alexandre, then PSG first alderman in Cayenne, was excluded from the party in January 2008 for presenting a list against the incumbent PSG mayor. He won the 2008 municipal election and became mayor, then won the 2010 regional elections and became president of the Regional Council, likewise for the 2015 Guianese Assembly.

== Electoral results ==
=== French legislative elections ===
French Guiana sends two deputies in Paris since 1988, beforehand only one. The electoral districts borders were considerably modified before the 2012 elections.

Year	Electoral district	PSG candidate	% of votes (first round)	% of votes (second round)
2002	1	Joseph Nicaise	15.58%	eliminated
2002	2			
2007	1	Antoine Karam	16.82%	eliminated
2007	2	none (Note: Chantal Berthelot, 23.22%, was an independent candidate supported by several left-wing parties, among whom the GSP and the Guianese Federation of the PS, she was elected at the second round)	-	
2012	1	Gabriel Serville	28.23%	54.70%
2012	2	none (Note: Chantal Berthelot, 38.17%, was once again an independent candidate supported by several left-wing parties, among whom the GSP and the Guianese Federation of the PS, she was elected at the second round)	-	
2017	1	Gabriel Serville	29.77%	51.33%
2017	2	none (Note: Chantal Berthelot, 19.45%, was once again an independent candidate supported by several left-wing parties, among whom the GSP and the Guianese Federation of the PS, she was eliminated at the first round)	-	
2018	2 (Note: the 2017 election was cancelled)	David Riché	10.08%	eliminated

=== Guianese Assembly elections ===
For the first elections to the Guianese Assembly in December 2015, the PSG did not compete as such but on a common list Cultiver la Guyane led by the deputy Chantal Berthelot of the party To the Left in Guiana (AGEG). The list got 8.49% of the votes in the first round, under the 10% threshold needed to access to the second round. Only two lists could compete for the second round and both their leaders refused any merger with lists that had got between 5% and 10% for the first round, thus eliminating from the new assembly the PSG, but also all the other parties hitherto represented in one or both previous councils: AGEG, Walwari (Christiane Taubira's party), MDES and LR.

=== Regional elections ===
Year	% of votes	Seats
1986	42.2	15/31
1992	39.6	16/31
1998	28.1	11/31
2004	22.5	17/31
2010	(6.14) (Note: the list had to merge with other left-wing ones for the second round)	1/31

== Office holders ==
=== Deputies ===
Single electoral district

- Justin Catayée (1958–1962) (Note: deceased during his term on June 22, 1962)
- Léopold Héder (1962–1967)
- Elie Castor (1981–1986)

Two districts

- Elie Castor (District 1, 1986–1993)
- Gabriel Serville (District 1, 2012–2017)

=== General councillors ===
French Guiana had a General Council like any other French department from 1946 until January 1, 2016 when it was replaced by the Guianese Assembly. The 19 general councillors were elected for six years but elections took place every three years for half of the cantons.

PSG councillors	years in office	presidency	other office(s)
Antoine Abienso	1985–1998		Mayor of Maripasoula (1989–1996)
Henri Agarande	1964–1976		Senator (1978–1980)
Alex Alexandre	2001–2015		Alderman in Cayenne (?–?)
M. Aron	1955–1961		
Étienne Barrat	1982–1985		
Etienne-Yves Barrat	1982–1988		
Albéric Benth (Note: rattached to the PSG group)	2004–2015		
Elie Castor	1976–1996	President (1979–1982, 1985–1994)	Deputy (1981–1993), Mayor of Sinnamary (1977–1996)
Jean Catayée	1976–2001		Alderman in Cayenne (?–?)
M. Catherine	1958–1964		
René Clervaux	1988–1994		
Claude Djani (Note: rattached to the PSG group)	2011–2015		
Jules Gaye	1955–1964		
René-Amédée Gustave	2004–2011		
Léopold Héder	1964–1978	President (1970–1973)	Deputy (1962–1967), Senator (1971–1978), Mayor of Cayenne (1965–1978)
Gérard Holder	1979–1998		Mayor of Cayenne (1978–1995)
Antoine Karam	1985–2015		President of the Regional Council (1992–2010), Municipal councillor in Cayenne (1977–2002); Senator (2014–)
Jacques Lony	1964–1982		President of the Regional Council (1980–1982)
Georges Othily (Note: He quit the PSG in 1989 and founded Democratic Forces of Guiana (FDG), close to Modern Left)	1979–1985)		Senator (1989–2008), Regional councillor (1982–2010), President of the Regional Council (1982–1992), Mayor of Iracoubo (1995–2001)
Stéphan Phinéra-Horth	1998–2001	President (1994–1998)	Municipal councillor in Cayenne (?–?)
Raymond Tarcy	1970–1982, 1985–1994		Senator (1980–1989), Mayor of Saint-Laurent-du-Maroni (1971–1983)
Marie-Claude Verdan	1994–2008		Regional councillor (?–?)

=== Mayors of Cayenne ===
- Léopold Héder (March 1965 – June 1978) (Note: deceased on June 9, 1978)
- Gérard Holder (June 1978 – June 1995)
- Jean-Claude Lafontaine (June 1995 – March 2008)
- Marie-Laure Phinéra-Horth (April 2010 – 2020) (Note: former PSG member, took office as miscellaneous left in 2010 as the then mayor Rodolphe Alexandre - also a former PSG member, excluded from the party two months before the March 2008 municipal elections after he announced his candidacy against Mayor Lafontaine - became president of the Regional council, she reaffiliated to the PSG and was elected as such at the head of a left-wing coalition in 2014)

=== Other mayors ===
There are 22 municipalities in French Guiana, eleven of whom had at least once since 1971 a PSG mayor, seven, including Cayenne, still had one after the 2014 municipal elections.

- Serge Adelson, mayor of Saint-Élie (1971–1983), then of Macouria (1983–2012)
- Elie Castor, mayor of Sinnamary (1977–1996)
- Paul Dolianki, mayor of Apatou (2008–)
- Georges Elfort, mayor of Saint-Georges (1994–1998, 2014–) (Note: joined the PSG in ?)
- Jean-Marcel Ganty, mayor of Remire-Montjoly (2007–)
- Paul Martin, mayor of Grand-Santi (2001–)
- Georges Patient, mayor of Mana (1989–), (Note: left the PSG in ?) senator since 2008
- Paul Suitman, mayor of Camopi (1985–1992)
- Gabriel Serville, mayor of Matoury (2014–), deputy since 2012
- Raymond Tarcy, mayor of Saint-Laurent-du-Maroni (1971–1983)
