= 2004 electoral calendar =

National and federal elections held in 2004

This electoral calendar 2004 lists the national/federal direct elections held in 2004 in the de jure and de facto sovereign states and their dependent territories. Referendums are included, although they are not elections. By-elections are not included.

== January ==
- 4 January: Georgia, president.
- 20 January: Faroe, parliament.

== March ==
- 7 March: Greece, parliament.
- 14 March: Russia, president.
- 14 March: Spain, house and senate.
- 20 March: Taiwan, president and referendum.
- 21 March: El Salvador, president.
- 21 March: Malaysia, parliament.
- 23 March: Antigua and Barbuda, parliament.
- 28 March: Georgia, parliament.
- 28 March: Guinea-Bissau, parliament.
- 21 and 28 March: Guadeloupe, parliament.
- 21 and 28 March: Martinique, parliament.
- 21 and 28 March: French Guiana, parliament.
- 21 and 28 March: Reunion, parliament.
- 21 and 28 March: Mayotte, parliament.

== April ==
- 2 April: Sri Lanka, parliament
- 5 April: Indonesia, parliament
- 8 April: Algeria, President
- 14 April: South Africa, parliament
- 15 April: South Korea, parliament
- 3 and 17 April:: Slovakia, president
- 21 April: Guernsey, parliament
- 18 April: and April 25: Comoros, parliament
- 25 April: Austria, president
- 25 April: Equatorial Guinea, parliament
- 14 April: and April 28: Macedonia, president

== May ==
- 2 May: Panama, president and parliament
- 20 February and 7 May: Iran, parliament
- 9 May: New Caledonia, parliament
- 20 and 26 April: India, parliament
- 5 and 10 May: India, parliament
- 10 May: Philippines, president, house and senate
- 16 May: Dominican Republic, president
- 18 May: Malawi, president and parliament
- 23 May: French Polynesia, parliament
- 23 May: South Ossetia, parliament

== June ==
- 10–11 June: European Union, parliament
- 13 June: European Union, parliament
- 13 June: Luxembourg, parliament
- 13 and 27 June: Lithuania, president
- 13 and 27 June: Serbia, president
- 26 June: Iceland, president
- 27 June: Mongolia, parliament
- 28 June: Canada, parliament

== July ==
- 6 July: Vanuatu, parliament
- 11 July: Japan, senate

== September ==
- 7 September: Cook Island, parliament
- 5 July and 20 September: Indonesia, president

== October ==
- 19 September and 3 October: Kazakhstan, parliament
- 3 October: Abkhazia, President
- 3 October: Slovenia, parliament
- 9 October: Afghanistan, President
- 9 October: Australia, Legislative
- 11 October: Cameroon, president
- 17 October: Belarus, Parliament and referendum
- 20 October: Norfolk, parliament
- 23 October: Kosovo, parliament
- 23 October: Nauru, parliament
- 10 and 24 October: Lithuania, parliament
- 24 October: Tunisia, president and parliament
- 25 October: Saint Kitts and Nevis, parliament
- 30 October: Botswana, parliament
- 31 October: Ukraine, president
- 31 October: Uruguay, president and parliament

== November ==
- 2 November: United States, President, every member of the House of Representatives, and one-third of the Senate
- 2 November: Puerto Rico, Governor, House and Senate
- 2 November: US Virgin Islands, legislature
- 2 November: American Samoa, Governor and Legislature
- 2 November: Palau, President, House and Senate
- 5–6 November: Czech Republic, senate
- 13 November and 4 December: Niger, president and parliament
- 15–16 November: Namibia, president and parliament
- 28 November: Romania, President, Senate and Chamber

== December ==
- 1–2 December: Mozambique, president and parliament
- 7 and 28 December: Ghana, president and parliament
- 11 December: Taiwan, parliament
- 12 December: Romania, president 2nd round
- 19 December: Turkmenistan, parliament
- 21 December and 4 January: Croatia, president
- 24 December: Pitcairn Islands, parliament
- 26 December: Uzbekistan, parliament
