= French Guiana's 1st constituency =

Constituency of the French Fifth Republic

1st constituency of French Guiana
- inline Constituency of the National Assembly of France

- Map of National Assembly constituencies in French Guiana
- Deputy: Jean-Victor Castor; MDES
- Department: French Guiana
- Cantons: Approuague-Kaw, Cayenne-1-Nord-Ouest, Cayenne-2-Nord-Est, Cayenne-3-Sud-Ouest, Cayenne-4-Centre, Cayenne-5-Sud, Cayenne-6-Sud-Est, Matoury, Remire-Montjoly, Roura, Saint-Georges-Oyapock
- Registered voters: 65,803

The 1st constituency of French Guiana is one of two French National Assembly constituencies in the French Guiana département. Located in the eastern third of the department, the constituency contains the capital city of Cayenne.

The constituency has been represented by Jean-Victor Castor of the Decolonization and Social Emancipation Movement since 2022.

== Deputies ==
Election	Member	Party
1988	Elie Castor	PS
1993	Christiane Taubira	Walwari
1997	Christiane Taubira	Walwari
2002	Christiane Taubira	Walwari
2007	Christiane Taubira	Walwari
2012	Gabriel Serville	PSG
2017	Gabriel Serville	PSG
2022	Jean-Victor Castor	MDES
2024	Jean-Victor Castor	MDES

== Recent election results ==
=== 2024 ===
Candidate	Party	Alliance	First round			Second round		
Candidate	Party	Alliance	Votes	%	+/–	Votes	%	+/–
Jean-Victor Castor	MDES	GDR	12,895	42.01	+1.0	14,302	76.11	+19.61
Boris Chong Sit	DVD		3,308	16.10	+4.61	4,490	23.89	
Yvane Goua	REG		2,158	10.51	-10.26			
Olivier Taoumi	RN		1,916	9.33	+3.9			
Jean-Yves Mirakoff	DVG		264	0.45	new			
Votes			20,541	100.00		18,792	100.00	
Valid votes			20,541	97.35	+0.63	18,792	96.87	+3.13
Blank votes			314	1.49	-0.46	406	2.09	-1.94
Null votes			245	1.16	-0.17	201	1.04	-1.18
Turnout			2,100	35.61	+8.34	19,399	32.73	+2.81
Abstentions			38,145	64.39	-8.34	39,866	67.27	-2.81
Registered voters			59,245			59,265		
Result			MDES HOLD					

=== 2022 ===
In 2022, Jean-Victor Castor of the pro-independence Decolonization and Social Emancipation Movement was elected over Yvane Goua. Castor was supported by the New Anticapitalist Party (NPA), while Goua was supported by La France Insoumise.

Legislative Election 2022: French Guiana's 1st constituency
Party	Candidate	Votes	%	±%
REG	Yvane Goua	3,122	20.77	N/A
Decolonization and Social Emancipation Movement	Jean-Victor Castor	2,601	17.30	N/A
DVC	Boris Chong-Sit	2,349	15.62	N/A
DVD	Joëlle Prevot-Madere	1,728	11.49	N/A
DVG	Thibault Lechat-Vega	970	6.45	N/A
RN	Jérôme Harbourg	817	5.43	N/A
DVG	Philippe Bouba	812	5.40	N/A
DVG	Line Letard	436	2.90	−7.50
DVG	Emmanuel Felissaint	385	2.56	N/A
DVG	Rudy Stephenson	383	2.55	N/A
DVC	Alix Madeleine	344	2.29	N/A
Others	N/A	1,087	-	−
Turnout		15,034	27.27	+3.42
2nd round result
Decolonization and Social Emancipation Movement	Jean-Victor Castor	9,038	56.5	
REG	Yvane Goua	6,951	43.5	
Turnout		15,989	29.92	+0.64
Decolonization and Social Emancipation Movement gain from DVG				

=== 2017 ===
In 2017, Serville was narrowly reelected against 2012 rival Joëlle Prévot-Madère, who was running this time as a member La République En Marche!.

Candidate	Label	First round		Second round	
Candidate	Label	Votes	%	Votes	%
Gabriel Serville	DVG	3,595	29.77	7,546	51.33
Joëlle Prévot-Madère	REM	3,572	29.58	7,156	48.67
Jemetree Guard	DVG	1,262	10.45		
Line Letard	DVG	1,256	10.40		
Claire Albanesi	FI	1,082	8.96		
Michel Quammie	DVD	743	6.15		
Armand Achille	REG	216	1.79		
Sylvio Leon Letard	REG	139	1.15		
Julien Deroche	DVG	126	1.04		
Michel Sabas	DVG	85	0.70		
Arlette Feuillié	DIV	1	0.01		
Votes		12,077	100.00	14,702	100.00
Valid votes		12,077	94.36	14,702	93.56
Blank votes		469	3.66	632	4.02
Null votes		253	1.98	380	2.42
Turnout		12,799	23.85	15,714	29.28
Abstentions		40,858	76.15	37,948	70.72
Registered voters		53,657		53,662	
Source: Ministry of the Interior

=== 2012 ===
In 2012, Christiane Taubira chose not to run for reelection following her appointment as Minister of Justice. Gabriel Serville, a former mayor of Matoury running as a member of the Guianese Socialist Party, defeated Joëlle Prévot-Madère, the president of CPGME Guyana.

Legislative Election 2012: French Guiana 1st - 2nd round
Party	Candidate	Votes	%	±%
PSG	Gabriel Serville	8,369	54.70	
DVG	Joëlle Prévot-Madère	6,931	45.30	
Turnout		16,332	35.21	
PSG gain from PRG				

=== 2007 ===
In 2007, Taubira was elected for a fourth and final term versus Rémy-Louis Budoc (UMP), who she also faced in 2002. During the 2007 contest, which took place just weeks after Nicolas Sarkozy's election as president, Taubira stated that she was "approached" by Sarkozy's associates about the possibility of joining the government of François Fillon. Budoc pushed back against the claim, arguing that "[Taubira] criticized Nicolas Sarkozy too unfairly to deserve to enter this government".

Legislative Election 2007: French Guiana 1st - 2nd round
Party	Candidate	Votes	%	±%
PRG	Christiane Taubira	5,695	63.41	
UMP	Rémy-Louis Budoc	3,286	36.59	
Turnout		9,476	42.46	
PRG hold		Swing		

== Sources ==
- French Interior Ministry results website: "Résultats électoraux officiels en France" (in French).
- "Résultats électoraux officiels en France" (in French). 2017.
