= 2024 French legislative election in Guyane =

Following the first round of the 2024 French legislative election on 30 June 2024, runoff elections in each constituency where no candidate received a vote share greater than 50 percent were scheduled for 7 July. Candidates permitted to stand in the runoff elections needed to either come in first or second place in the first round or achieve more than 12.5 percent of the votes of the entire electorate (as opposed to 12.5 percent of the vote share due to low turnout).

== Guyane ==
=== 1st constituency ===
Candidate	Party or alliance		First round		Second round	
Candidate	Party or alliance		Votes	%	Votes	%
Jean-Victor Castor	Regionalists (NFP)	Decolonization and Social Emancipation Movement	12,895	62.78	14,302	76.11
Boris Chong-Sit	Miscellaneous right	Independent	3,308	16.10	4,490	23.89
Yvane Goua	Regionalists	Independent	2,158	10.51		
Olivier Taoumi	Union of the far right	The Republicans	1,916	9.33		
Jean-Yves Mirakoff	Miscellaneous left	Independent	264	1.29		
Total			20,541	100.00	18,792	100.00
Valid votes			20,541	97.35	18,792	96.87
Invalid votes			245	1.16	201	1.04
Blank votes			314	1.49	406	2.09
Total votes			21,100	100.00	19,399	100.00
Registered voters/turnout			59,245	35.61	59,265	32.73

=== 2nd constituency ===
Candidate	Party or alliance		First round		Second round	
Candidate	Party or alliance		Votes	%	Votes	%
Davy Rimane	Regionalists (NFP)	Miscellaneous left	8,307	60.21	8,422	100.00
Sophie Charles	Miscellaneous centre	Independent	3,516	25.49		
Jean-Philippe Dolor	Miscellaneous centre	Independent	1,110	8.05		
Aldo Néman	Miscellaneous left	Independent	594	4.31		
Sébastien Caugant	Far-left	Lutte Ouvrière	269	1.95		
Total			13,796	100.00	8,422	100.00
Valid votes			13,796	96.06	8,422	91.94
Invalid votes			270	1.88	122	1.33
Blank votes			296	2.06	616	6.72
Total votes			14,362	100.00	9,160	100.00
Registered voters/turnout			49,655	28.92	49,684	18.44
