= Gaumont (disambiguation) =

Gaumont is a French company in film production and distribution.

- Gaumont International Television (founded 2011), an American television division of the above
- Gaumont Animation (founded 1997), an animation division of the above
- Gaumont Italia (1978–1984, 2022–present), an Italian subsidiary of the above

Gaumont may also refer to:

- Gaumont (surname)

== Geography ==
- Sombre [fr], a tributary of the Dordogne, sometimes known as the Gaumont

== Companies ==
- Gaumont-British (independent 1922), a former film production company, active during 1898–1938
- Gaumont Buena Vista International, a joint film distribution of Gaumont and Buena Vista International, active during 1992–2004

== Live performance and theatre venues ==
- Gaumont Cinema, a former theatre in Southend, UK, built by Bertie Crewe
- Gaumont Haymarket, a cinema in London, UK 1937–1959
- Gaumont State Cinema, a former theatre in Kilburn district, London, UK
- Gaumont-Palace, a cinema in Paris open from 1907 to 1973
- Cine Gaumont, a cinema in Buenos Aires, Argentina
- Bradford Odeon, formerly the Gaumont, a theatre in Bradford, UK
- Hammersmith Apollo, formerly the Gaumont Palace, a performance venue in London
- Mayflower Theatre, formerly the Gaumont Theatre, a theatre in Southampton, United Kingdom
- Regent Theatre, formerly the Gaumont Theatre, a theatre and concert venue located in Ipswich, Suffolk, England
