= Marie-Laure Phinéra-Horth =

French Guianan politician

Marie-Laure Phinéra-Hort
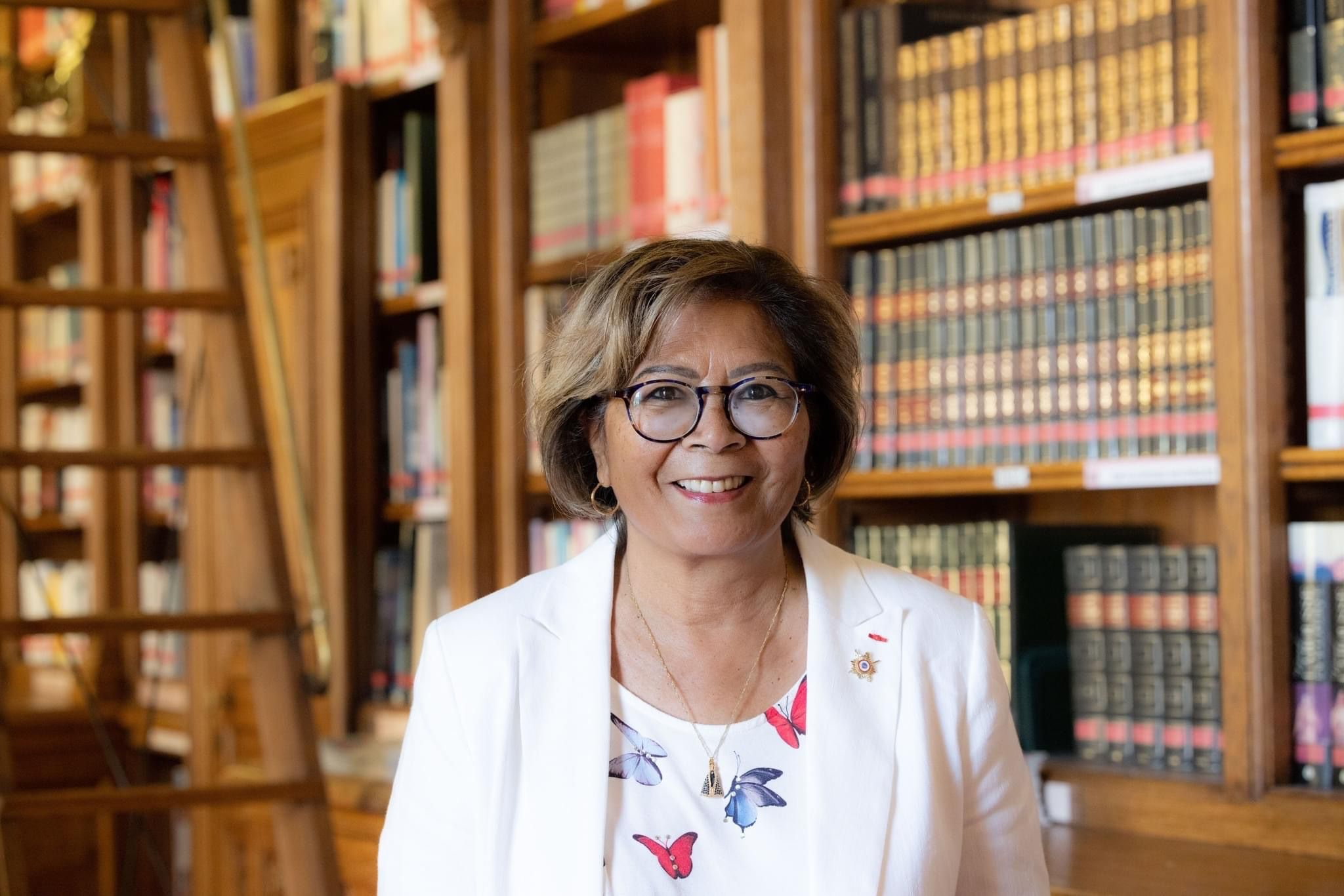

Member of the French Senate for Guyane
- Incumbent
- Assumed office 1 October 2020
- Preceded by: Antoine Karam

Mayor of Cayenne
- In office 2010–2020
- Preceded by: Rodolphe Alexandre
- Succeeded by: Sandra Trochimara

Personal details
- Born: 28 June 1957 (age 69)
- Party: Guianese Socialist Party
- Education: Pierre and Marie Curie University
- Profession: Orthophonist

Marie-Laure Phinéra-Horth (born 28 June 1957) is a French politician, who was the first woman from French Guiana to be appointed to the French Senate in 2020. Prior to her role as a senator, she was mayor of Cayenne from 2010.

== Biography ==
Phinéra-Horth joined the Guianese Socialist Party (PSG) in 1988, of which she was treasurer for two years. She was elected as a municipal councillor of Cayenne in 1995, re-elected in 2001 and 2008. From 1995 to 2008 she was the sixth deputy to mayor Jean-Claude Lafontaine; then first deputy to his successor Rodolphe Alexandre. When the latter acceded to the presidency of the regional council, she was elected to succeed him as mayor on 8 April 2010.

Supported by both the PSG and Walwari, in 2014 Phinéra-Horth left Alexandre's "Guiana 73" movement. On 23 March 2014, she was re-elected and won the municipal elections in the first round with 6,976 votes, or 69.75%. She was officially invested by the municipal council on 28 March.

On 20 May 2016, she founded a new political party - Guyana's New Force (fr), which is primarily active in Cayenne. Leading an NFG-Walwari-PSG-Guyane Écologie union list, she again won the 2020 elections with 60.46% of the vote. Phinéra-Horth was elected French Guiana's first female senator on 27 September 2020.

In May 2021, as part of an appearance on the television programme Politik Hebdo, Phinéra-Horth revealed that she was opposed to COVID-19 vaccinations. In February 2022, she was taken to court, accused of falsely collecting a salary as a speech therapist during her time as mayor from 2013 to 2016.
