= Flight 117 =

Flight 117 may refer to:

- Air France Flight 117, crashed on 22 June 1962
- Singapore Airlines Flight 117, hijacked on 26 March 1991

== See also ==
- STS-117, a successful Space Shuttle mission in June 2007
