= Édouard Gaumont =

Édouard Gaumont born on June 30, 1915, in Cayenne, French Guiana, died on October 15, 2008, was a French deputy of French Guiana, Lawyer and Infantry Captain. Edouard Gaumont married Josèphe Madeleine Polycarpe with whom he has nine children including renowned professional musicians Eddy, Joëlle and Dominique.

== Biography. ==
Édouard Gaumont
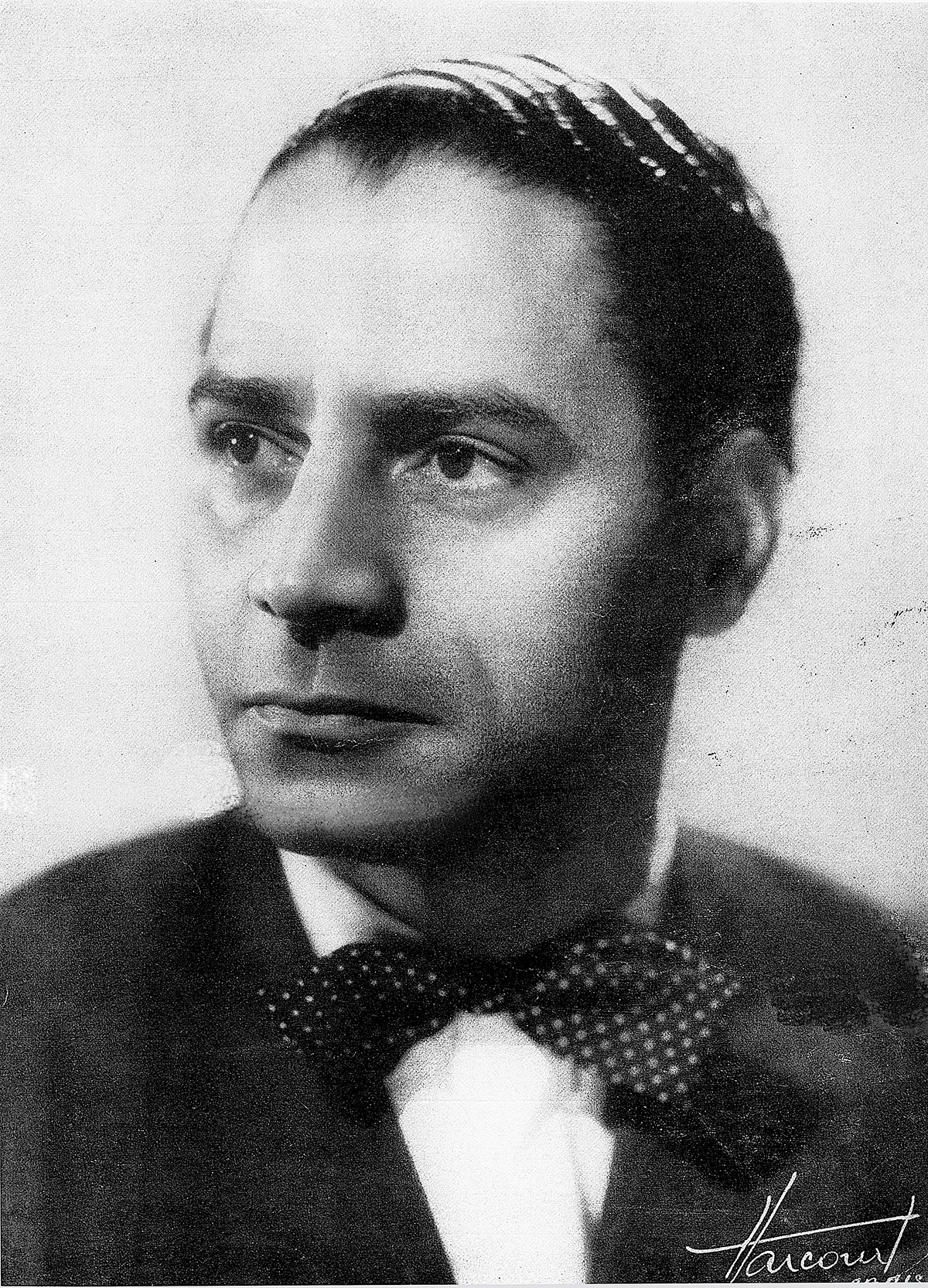
- Born: 30 June 1915; Cayenne, French Guiana
- Died: 15 October 2008 (aged 93); Versailles, France
- Citizenship: French
- Education: Doctorate in Law - Degree in Philosophy - Military School of Infantry and Battle Tanks
- Occupations: French Deputy - Member of the Economic and Social Council from 1964 to 1974 - Lawyer - Colonial Infantry Captain.
- Political party: RPF (Rally of the French People) - Républicains Sociaux

Coming from a modest background in Guyana, first a student at the Sisters of Saint-Joseph de Cluny school, then at Cayenne college. After his baccalaureate, it is alone, outside any university structure, that he works on his law degree, by going to Fort-de-France to take the exams. He validated his license at the Faculty of Law of Paris which he obtained in June 1938.

He then left for Paris, where he concluded his studies with a doctorate in law, and at the same time prepared the. Mobilized when the war broke out, he spent nearly a year in the army as a second class soldier: after the defeat, Edouard Gaumont briefly resumed his studies, and obtained a license in philosophy: then he enrolled at the end of 1940, as a lawyer at the Aix-en-Provence Court of Appeal.

With the Liberation, Edouard Gaumont stops his legal activities to embrace the career of the weapons: pupil of the Military school of the Infantry and the tanks of combat, he is at his exit, in 1946, affected at his request in Guyana; his rise in the military hierarchy is rapid, since he was appointed in 1949 commander of the colonial infantry company of Guyana; there, while doing his job as a soldier, he gives lectures and private lessons, and volunteers to lead the cultural activities of the Félix-Eboué home in Cayenne.

His political activity began in 1948: he was an unsuccessful candidate in January for the partial legislative elections in Guyana, with a view to filling the seat left vacant by the death of René Jadfard; this failure brought him back to his military career, and it was in 1950, when he took temporary leave of his department of origin, that he was promoted to the rank of colonial infantry captain.

He stood in the legislative elections under the label of the Rassemblement du Peuple Français (RPF), on June 17, 1951: with 2,099 votes out of 5,928 votes cast, he stole the only seat to be filled from the socialist Léon Gontran Damas, and between in the National Assembly.

Edouard Gaumont was then appointed to the Economic Affairs Commission, to the Universal Suffrage, Rules and Petitions Commission and to the Justice and Legislation Commission. Expert in colonial issues, he took an active part in parliamentary work relating to Indochina: he was thus appointed member of the Commission responsible for investigating the traffic in Indochinese piastres, and appointed by the Economic Affairs Commission to be part, as a substitute member, of the Coordinating Commission for the examination of problems of interest to the Associated States of Indochina.

When he requested from his electors, for the legislative elections of January 2, 1956, the renewal of his mandate, Edouard Gaumont did not fail to recall the consistency with which he defended the interests of Guyanese; still wearing the colors of Gaullism, this time under the label of Social Republicans, he obtained in the ballot of January 2, 1956 4,549 votes out of 7,671 votes cast.

During the third legislature, Edouard Gaumont was appointed full member of the Finance Committee, member of the Press Committee and member of the Justice and Legislation Committee. It is within the Finance Committee that his action is most notable: appointed by his peers to be part of the sub-committee responsible for monitoring and assessing the management of industrial companies and semi-public companies, he was also elected secretary of the Commission on July 17, 1957.

During this last legislature of the Fourth Republic, Edouard Gaumont did not take part in the ballot during the investiture of Guy Mollet (January 31, 1956); he votes for special powers in Algeria (March 12, 1956) and against the ratification of the treaties establishing the European Economic Community and Euratom (July 9, 1957). Retained in his department, Edouard Gaumont could not participate in the investiture votes of Pierre Pflimlin (May 13, 1958) and General de Gaulle (June 1, 1958), or in the vote of full powers (June 2, 1958).

From 1964 to 1974 Edouard was a member of the French Economic and Social Council.

=== Testimonial ===
The political action of Edouard Gaumont marked his department of origin as testified by Rodolphe Alexandre, mayor of Cayenne:

«Edouard Gaumont, lawyer at the Aix-en-Provence Court of Appeal and philosopher with whom I was in constant contact, honored Guyana throughout his life. Insatiable, this child of Guyana, a student at the Military School of Infantry and Combat Tanks, will stand out as an excellent operational soldier, exceptionally under the subterfuge of the territory of Inini, in Guyana, as Commander of the company Colonial Infantry from Guyana, then as Colonial Infantry Captain.

Edouard Gaumont, as a Member of Parliament, also stood out in his capacity as a politician for having participated in changing the situation of Guyana within the National Assembly, in particular on the laws of departmentalization (Social Security, etc. ..)»

== Parliamentary activity ==
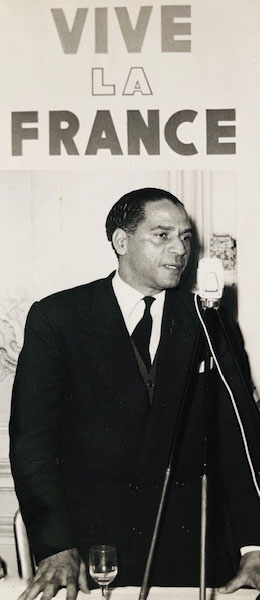
Édouard Gaumont

But it is his parliamentary activity that requires his attention the most; it focuses primarily on issues relating to the economic and social development of the French overseas territories in general, and Guyana in particular; the most significant of his motions for resolution in this regard is that of June 1, 1954, which seeks the appointment by the National Assembly of a parliamentary commission of inquiry responsible for examining the conditions under which the administration operates in Guyana. prefectural and the various services, public establishments or bodies benefiting from State aid.

- Edouard Gaumont votes the Marie and Barangé laws favorable to private education (September 21, 1951), and against the ratification of the treaty establishing the European Coal and Steel Community (December 13, 1951).
- Refraining from the investiture vote of Antoine Pinay (March 6, 1952), he decided on the other hand in favor of Joseph Laniel (June 26, 1953), then of Pierre Mendés France (June 17, 1954).
- Edouard Gaumont opposes the European Defense Community project by voting on the preliminary question which leads to its rejection (August 30, 1954); he votes for the ratification of the London agreements on the end of the occupation of Germany (October 12, 1954), and for the ratification of the Paris agreements which authorize the entry of Germany into Europe (December 29, 1954) .
- After having voted confidence in Pierre Mendès-France on Algeria (February 4, 1955, fall of the cabinet), he supported Edgar Faure (vote of confidence of February 23, 1955), but, retained in his department, did not take part in the vote on the voting method and the date of the elections which precipitated the fall of the Faure cabinet.
