= Guiana Rally =

Guiana Rally Guyane rassemblement
- Leader: Rodolphe Alexandre
- Founder: Rodolphe Alexandre
- Founded: 2010 (as a political association); 12 September 2015 (as a party)
- Split from: Guianese Socialist Party
- Headquarters: Cayenne
- Ideology: Liberalism; Pro-Europeanism
- Political position: Centre
- National affiliation: Ensemble Citoyens (since 2021); La République En Marche! (since 2017)
- National Assembly (Guiana seats): 1 / 2
- Senate (Guiana seats): 1 / 2
- European Parliament: 0 / 74
- Guianese Assembly (fr): 20 / 55

The Guiana Rally (French: Guyane rassemblement, GR) is a political party in the French overseas région of French Guiana, in South America.

== History ==
Guiana Rally was founded in 2010 as the political association and electoral list Guiana 73 (named after Article 73 of the Constitution of France) by Rodolphe Alexandre, after he was expelled from the Guianese Socialist Party (PSG) on 16 January 2008 for presenting a list against the incumbent PSG mayor of Cayenne. He had also voted for Nicolas Sarkozy in the first round of the 2007 French presidential election, despite the PSG having supported the candidacy of Ségolène Royal, and the PSG later supported the re-election of Cayenne mayor Jean-Claude Lafontaine as opposed to then-deputy mayor Alexandre, who had also announced he would run for the position. He won the 3 September 2008 municipal election and became mayor, then won the 2010 regional elections with the support of the Liaison Committee for the Presidential Majority and became president of the Regional Council, and then won the 2015 elections for the Guianese Assembly.

== Electoral results ==
=== Regional elections ===
Year	Round	Votes	% of votes	Seats
2010	1	12,202	40.61	21/31
2010	2	19,152	56.11	21/31
2015	1	15,298	42.34	35/51
2015	2	21,163	54.55	35/51
2021	1	15,017	43.72	20/55
2021	2	20,876	45.17	20/55
