= Hector Riviérez =

French politician and lawyer

Member of the National Assembly
- In office 5 March 1967 – 22 May 1981
- Preceded by: Léopold Héder
- Succeeded by: Élie Castor
- Constituency: French Guiana

Senator for Oubangui-Chari
- In office 18 May 1952 – 5 May 1959

Personal details
- Born: Hector Joseph Riviérez; 19 March 1913 Cayenne, French Guiana
- Died: 26 May 2003 (aged 90) Paris, France
- Party: RPR

Hector Joseph Riviérez (19 March 1913 – 26 May 2003) was a French lawyer and politician. He served as a Deputy for French Guiana in the National Assembly from 1967 to 1981 and as a Senator representing the Oubangui-Chari territory (present-day Central African Republic) from 1952 to 1959.

== Early life and legal career ==
Born in Cayenne, Riviérez moved to mainland France to pursue legal studies. He was admitted to the Paris Bar in 1936. During his early career, he served as secretary of the Conférence du stage and president of the Union of Young Lawyers of Paris (UJA de Paris).

== Political career ==
In May 1952, Riviérez was elected to the Council of the Republic (Senate) representing Oubangui-Chari. He held this seat until May 1959, serving as a member of the Independent Republicans group. During the transition of French colonies to independence, he participated in the formation of the legislative institutions of the Central African Republic.

Returning to his native French Guiana, Riviérez was elected as a deputy to the National Assembly in 1967. He was re-elected in 1968, 1973, and 1978. In the Assembly, he aligned with the Gaullist movements, including the Union of Democrats for the Republic (UDR) and the Rally for the Republic (RPR). He was a proponent of the departmentalization of the territory within the French Republic.

Beyond his national parliamentary duties, Riviérez served as a member of the European Parliament between 1973 and 1984, contributing to the European Progressive Democrats group. He did not seek re-election to the National Assembly in 1981 and was succeeded by Élie Castor.

== Honours ==
- Commander of the Legion of Honour (1995)
- Commander of the National Order of Merit (1970)
