= Gérard La Viny =

20th century French singer and songwriter

- Born: 17 April 1933; Basse-Terre, Guadeloupe, France
- Died: 6 October 2009; Paris, France
- Occupation(s): musician, singer-songwriter
- Instruments: guitar; voice; violin; banjo

Gérard Marie Anicet Labiny (17 April 1933 – 6 October 2009), known professionally as Gérard La Viny, was a French singer-songwriter and musician.

== Biography ==
Gérard La Viny was born Gérard Marie Anicet Labiny in Basse-Terre, a commune in the French overseas department of Guadeloupe.

He lost his father Roger Emile Labiny in June 1962, in the Air France Flight 117 crash.

La Viny died in 2009 in Paris and rests at the Montmartre Cemetery.

== Songs ==
One of La Viny's songs, entitled Albert Bernard Bongo, c'est le président qu’il nous faut, is sung during Gabon's presidential elections.

In 1960, he released a record containing, in French, four songs from the film Black Orpheus.

Following the death of his father, in 1962, he recorded a biguine Volé Boeing-la in tribute to the victims of the crash.

== Distinctions ==
- Chevaliers of the Ordre des Arts et des Lettres (2004)
