= Gaumont (surname) =

Gaumont is a French surname. Notable people with the surname include:

- Dominique Gaumont (1953–1983), French guitarist
- Édouard Gaumont (1915–2008), French Guianese politician
- Léon Gaumont (1864–1946), French inventor and industrialist, pioneer of the movie industry
- Marcel Gaumont (1880-1962), French sculptor
- Philippe Gaumont (1973–2013), French cyclist
