= Paul Niger =

French writer

- Born: Albert Thomas Gaston Béville; 21 December 1915; Basse-Terre (France)
- Died: 22 June 1962; Deshaies (France)
- Education: colonial School
- Occupations: Writer, poet, journalist
- Political party: Rassemblement Démocratique Africain

Paul Niger (21 December 1915 – 22 June 1962) was a poet and political activist from Basse-Terre, Guadeloupe. He was born Albert Béville, but Niger's passion for Africa led him to take the pen name of the great African Niger River. His major theme was Africa and the pride that he felt in being a descendant of Africans. According to the Encyclopedia of Caribbean Literature, Niger completed secondary studies at the Lycée Carnot in the town of Pointe-à-Pitre. Later on, during World War II, he travelled to Paris to attend the École de la France d’Outre-mer, a school established to train colonial officers. Niger was a supporter of the Négritude, a black consciousness movement founded by Aimé Césaire, Léon-Gontran Damas, and Léopold Senghor (early to mid 1900s).

Edward A. Jones, publisher of Voices of Negritude (1971), described Niger's poetry as, “at once violent and tender, like the land of his ancestors”.

Niger was one of those killed in the crash of Air France Flight 117.

== Bibliography ==
- Herbert Mnguni, Mbukeni (1998). Education as a Social Institution and Ideological Process. Germany: Waxman Verlag GmbH. ISBN 3-8309-5696-7.
