= Péyi Guyane =

Political party in French Guiana

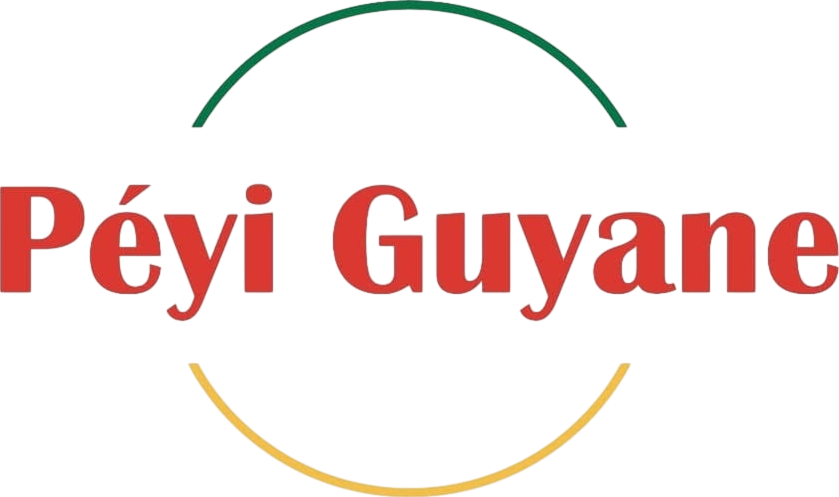
- President: Gabriel Serville
- Founded: 19 October 2018
- Ideology: Progressivism
- Political position: Left-wing
- Regional affiliation: Guyane Kontré
- Assembly of French Guiana: 35 / 55

Péyi Guyane (lit. 'Land of Guiana' in French Guianese Creole; French: Pays Guyane) is a political party in French Guiana. It was founded in 2018 by Gabriel Serville, then an independent left-wing member of the French National Assembly for French Guiana.

In 2021, the party won a majority of the seats in the Assembly of French Guiana, and Serville was elected the assembly's president. In national elections, Péyi Guyane supports the Socialist Party and La France Insoumise.

== History ==
Left-wing politician Gabriel Serville announced the founding of Péyi Guyane on 19 October 2018, with the party's first meeting held that evening at the Chamber of Commerce and Industry. Serville was at the time an independent member of the French National Assembly for French Guiana, and before then the mayor of Matoury from 2014 to 2017. By the end of 2019, Péyi Guyane had about a hundred members, with the party's deputy secretary-general Guylène Mathieu stating the party was still in its "formative stages".

Initially, Serville said his party took inspiration from En Marche, the liberal party of French president Emmanuel Macron, describing Péyi Guyane as a grassroots movement formed to revitalise the political scene in French Guiana. However, Serville shifted his and his party's support to the Socialist Party and La France Insoumise, supporting the latter's candidate in the 2022 presidential election, Jean-Luc Mélenchon. Conversely, Mélenchon supported Péyi Guyane's campaign during the 2021 legislative election in French Guiana, as well as Serville's subsequent bid for President of the Assembly of French Guiana, both of which were successful.
