= Assembly of French Guiana =

Unicameral legislature of French Guiana, France

Coordinates: 4.930033046995366°N 52.28861810450738°W

Assembly of French Guiana Assemblée de Guyane
- 2021–2028 Term
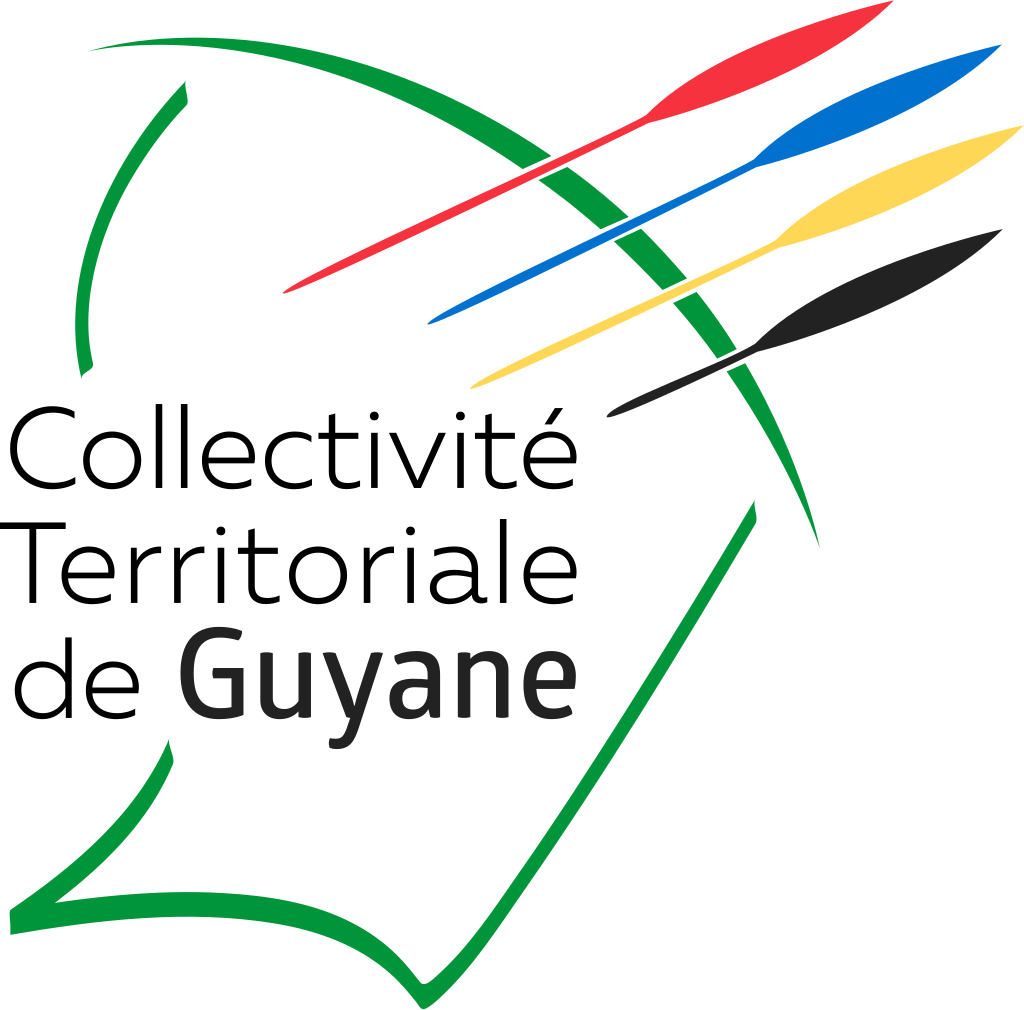

Type
- Type: Unicameral

Leadership
- President: Vacant since 30 September 2026
- First Vice-President: Jean-Paul Fereira (AGEG) since 2 July 2021
- Second Vice-President: Annie Robinson-Chocho (PG) since 2 July 2021

Structure
- Seats: 55 members
- Political groups: Government (35): Péyi Guyane (35); Opposition (20): Guiana Rally (20)
- Length of term: 6 years

Elections
- Voting system: Closed list proportional representation with majority bonus
- Last election: 20 and 27 June 2021

Meeting place
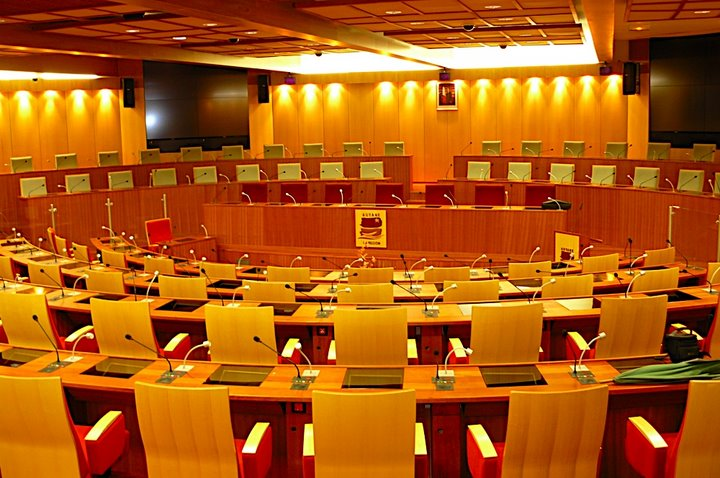
- 4179 Route de Montabo; Cayenne, French Guiana

Website
- ctguyane.fr

The Assembly of French Guiana (French: Assemblée de Guyane) is the regional legislature of French Guiana. It was first elected in 2015, replacing the General Council of French Guiana and the Regional Council of French Guiana.

It was established after a 2010 referendum changed the government structure to a single territorial collectivity. It currently has 55 members.

Gabriel Serville was elected to a six-year term in 2021, but died on September 30, 2026, leaving the office vacant.

== Electoral system ==
The electoral sections of the Assembly, as of November 2015.

There are eight multi-member electoral sections whose seats are distributed using closed list proportional representation with the highest average method. The lists must have alternation between male and female candidates. An eleven-seat majority bonus is given to the top-voted list.

In the first round, if a list receives the absolute majority of the votes in the community, they obtain the majority bonus which is distributed amongst the electoral sections. The rest of the 44 seats are distributed proportionally in each section to the lists who have won at least 5% of the votes at the community level.

A second round is held if no list gets the absolute majority in the first. Only the lists that received 10% or more of the votes in the first round can participate. Lists who won at least 5% of the first round votes could merge into the lists participating in the second round. The electoral system used in the first round is also used in the second. The majority bonus is given to the list with the most votes and is not necessary to acquire the absolute majority.

== Composition ==
President of the Assembly of French Guiana
Jean-Paul Fereira (Interim) (AGEG)
Party	Acronym	Seats	Group
Majority (35 seats)
Miscellaneous left	DVG	20	Guiana united to advance without limits
Péyi Guyane	Péyi G	7	Guiana united to advance without limits
La France Insoumise	LFI	2	Guiana united to advance without limits
Decolonization and Social Emancipation Movement	MDES	2	Guiana united to advance without limits
Left in French Guiana	AGEG	1	Guiana united to advance without limits
New Force of Guiana	NFG	1	Guiana united to advance without limits
Guianese Socialist Party	PSG	1	Guiana united to advance without limits
Génération.s	G·s	1	Guiana united to advance without limits
Opposition (20 seats)
Miscellaneous centre	DVC	10	United and Committed to our Territory
Guiana Rally	GR	5	United and Committed to our Territory
Miscellaneous right	DVD	2	United and Committed to our Territory
Miscellaneous left	DVG	2	United and Committed to our Territory
The Republicans]	LR	1	United and Committed to our Territory
