= Jean-Victor Castor =

French politician (born 1962)

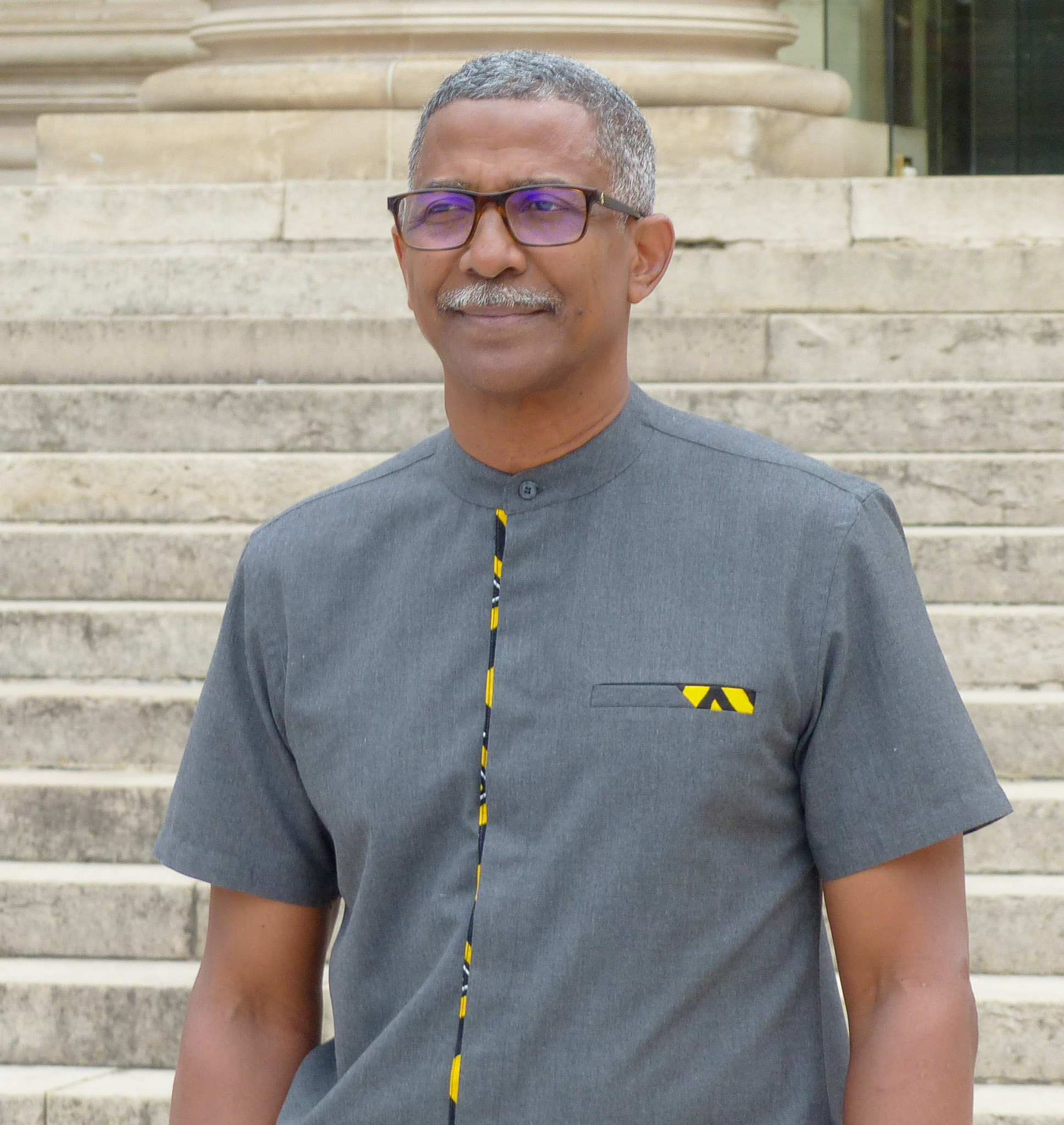

Member of the National Assembly for French Guiana
- Incumbent
- Assumed office 18 June 2022
- Preceded by: Gabriel Serville (2021)
- Constituency: 1st constituency

Personal details
- Born: 21 April 1962 (age 63) Sinnamary, French Guiana, France
- Party: Decolonization and Social Emancipation Movement (MDES)

Jean-Victor Castor (born 21 April 1962) is a French Guianese politician who was elected to represent French Guiana's 1st constituency in the 2022 legislative election. He is a member of the Decolonization and Social Emancipation Movement (MDES), a pro-independence party. He succeeded Lénaïck Adam, a member of La République En Marche!

== Early life and background ==
Castor was born in Sinnamary, French Guiana on 21 April 1962. Born to two teachers, Castor was the seventh born child of a family of eight children. Castor studied in Cayenne during his youth, and at age 16 became involved in student activism. He later studied in Metropolitan France before returning to Guiana, where he would campaign for the Union of Guyanese Students (UEG).

== Career ==
=== Activism and journalism ===
In 1985, he was one of the founders of Rot Kozé, which was created shortly after the founding of the Decolonization and Social Emancipation Movement (MDES). Castor later organized with the Union of Guyanese Workers and the Unified Trade Union Movement. In 2012, he became secretary-general of the MDES.

=== National Assembly of France ===
In the 2022 legislative election, Castor ran to represent French Guiana's 1st constituency in the National Assembly. In the first round of the election, he came in second place with 17.30% of the vote, with Yvane Goua of La France Insoumise coming in first with 20.77% of the vote. As a candidate, he was supported by the New Anticapitalist Party (NPA).

He decided to join the GDR (Gauche Démocratique et Républicaine) parliamentary group, which includes twelve PCF MPs and ten MPs from the French overseas territories.

On 4 May 2023, a parliamentary day reserved for his GDR group, he presented a bill to repeal compulsory anti-Covid vaccinations for healthcare workers. This proposal was adopted by the Assembly, against the advice of the government, which was in favor of simply suspending the obligation.

The newspaper Marianne says that he traveled twice, in July and November 2023, all expenses paid, to Baku in Azerbaijan for a conference on the fight against "colonialism". Azerbaijan wanted to make France pay for its support of Armenia in the conflict between the two countries. A country whose interference in France's overseas territories has been documented.

In February 2024, he and Davy Rimane welcomed pan-Africanist and black supremacist activist Kémi Séba.
