= Elections in Réunion =

Réunion elects on regional/départemental level a legislature. The legislature consists out of two councils with diverging powers. The Regional Council (Conseil régional) has 45 members, elected for a six-year term by proportional representation. The General Council (Conseil général) has members elected for a five-year term in single seat-constituencies. Reunion has a multi-party system, with numerous parties in which no one party often has a chance of gaining power alone, and parties must work with each other to form coalition governments.

== Recent elections ==
Party	First round		Second round			
Party	Votes	%	Votes	%	Seats	+/–
Alliance for Réunion (PCR–FD–MoDem)	71,602	30.23	112,201	35.55	12	–15
OR–UMP–NC–LGM	62,581	26.42	143,485	45.56	27	+16
PS–MRC	30,941	13.06	59,933	8.99	6	–1
Réunion Nout'Fierté	15,952	6.73			0	New
Better Future for the People of Réunion in France and Europe	14,014	5.92			0	0
Miscellaneous Right Movement	12,734	5.38			0	New
For Total Equality	11,809	4.99			0	New
Europe Écologie	11,685	4.93			0	New
Nasion Rénioné	2,097	0.89			0	0
Lutte Ouvrière	1,944	0.82			0	0
Réunionese Democratic Union	231	0.10			0	New
Independents	1,297	0.53			0	0
Invalid/blank votes	13,015	–	13,005	–	–	–
Total	249,872	100	328,624	100	45	0
Registered voters/turnout	550,442	45.35	550,480	59.70	–	
Source: French Politics, La Réunion

== See also ==
- Electoral calendar
- Electoral system
