= Air France Flight 117 =

1962 aviation accident in Guadeloupe

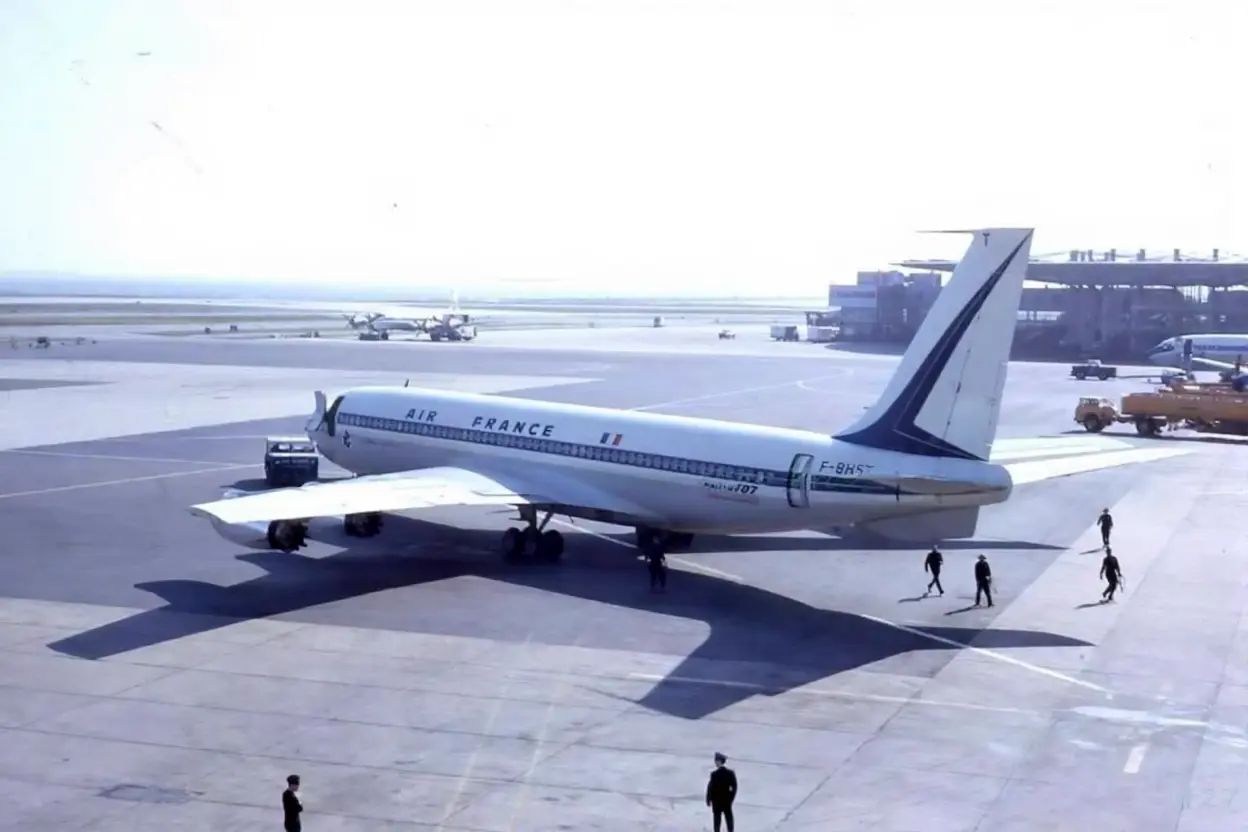
- F-BHST, the aircraft involved in the accident

Accident
- Date: 22 June 1962
- Summary: Controlled flight into terrain
- Site: Dos D'Ane, 25 km (15.5 mi) WNW of Pointe-à-Pitre, Guadeloupe; 16.311°N 61.768°W

Aircraft
- Aircraft type: Boeing 707–328
- Aircraft name: Château de Chantilly
- Operator: Air France
- IATA flight No.: AF117
- ICAO flight No.: AFR117
- Call sign: AIRFRANS 117
- Registration: F-BHST
- Flight origin: Paris Orly Airport, Paris, France
- 1st stopover: Lisbon Airport, Lisbon, Portugal
- 2nd stopover: Santa Maria Airport, Santa Maria, Azores
- 3rd stopover: Pointe-à-Pitre International Airport, Pointe-à-Pitre, Guadeloupe
- 4th stopover: Simón Bolívar International Airport, Caracas, Venezuela
- Last stopover: Jorge Chávez International Airport, Lima, Peru
- Destination: Los Cerillos, Santiago, Chile
- Occupants: 113
- Passengers: 103
- Crew: 10
- Fatalities: 113
- Survivors: 0

Air France Flight 117 was a multi-leg international scheduled flight operated by a Boeing 707 from Paris-Orly Airport via Lisbon, the Azores, Guadeloupe and Peru to Santiago, Chile, which crashed on 22 June 1962 killing 113 people.

This was the second accident in less than three weeks with an Air France Boeing 707 after the crash on 3 June 1962.

== Accident ==
The aircraft involved, a Boeing 707–328, was four months old at the time of the accident. The flight was uneventful until approaching Pointe-à-Pitre. The airport is surrounded by mountains and requires a steep descent. The weather was poor – violent thunderstorm and low cloud ceiling. The VOR navigational beacon was out of service. The crew reported themselves over the non-directional beacon (NDB) at 5,000 feet (1,524 m) and turned east to begin the final approach. Due to incorrect automatic direction finder (ADF) readings caused by the thunderstorm, the plane strayed 15 km (9.3 mi) west from the procedural let-down track. The plane crashed in a forest on a hill called Dos D'Ane ("The Donkey's Back"), at about 1,400 feet (427 m) and exploded. There were no survivors.

Among the dead were French Guianan politician and war hero Justin Catayée, poet and black-consciousness activist Paul Niger, and Wanda Llosa, first cousin of future Nobel laureate Mario Vargas Llosa.

== Investigation ==
The investigation could not determine the exact reason for the accident, but suspected the insufficient meteorological information given to the crew, failure of the ground equipment, and the atmospheric effects on the ADF indicator. After the crash Air France pilots criticized under-developed airports with facilities that were ill-equipped to handle jet aircraft, such as Guadeloupe's airport.

== Aftermath ==
Tex Johnston, Chief Test Pilot of Boeing Aircraft Co. wrote in his autobiography of events leading up to the crash. "Air France flight crews were habitually late (for crew training by Boeing), and on occasion the airplane not serviced. ... After much extra, and in my mind, excessive flight training, the chief pilot failed to qualify." He informed the Air France Chief Executive in writing "I did not believe the captain capable of qualifying in the 707." Later "... an Air France instructor qualified the chief pilot. On his second trip as captain, he missed an inclement weather approach... and crashed into a mountain."

Some debris still remain at the site, where a memorial monument was placed in 2002 to mark the 40th anniversary of the crash. The road leading to the site is named Route du Boeing in memory of the crash.

== Memorials ==
=== Monuments ===
Several commemorative steles were erected at the site of the accident at Dos d'Âne mountain on 22 June 1962, then in 2002 with an official stele of the commune and the region with the list of all the victims.

=== Songs ===
- Volé Boeing-la, de Gérard La Viny, 1962 (tribute to the victims of which his father died in the crash)

== Sources ==
- "Accident description". Aviation Safety Network.
- An article about the crash
- Tex Johnston: Jet-Age Test Pilot by A.M. "Tex" Johnston with Charles Barton ISBN 978-1560989318
