= Georges Guéril =

French Guianan politician

Georges Gueril (born October 28, 1909, in French Guiana, and died March 2, 1977, in Cayenne) was a politician from French Guiana who served in the French Senate from 1959 to 1962.
