= Sylviane Vayaboury =

French writer

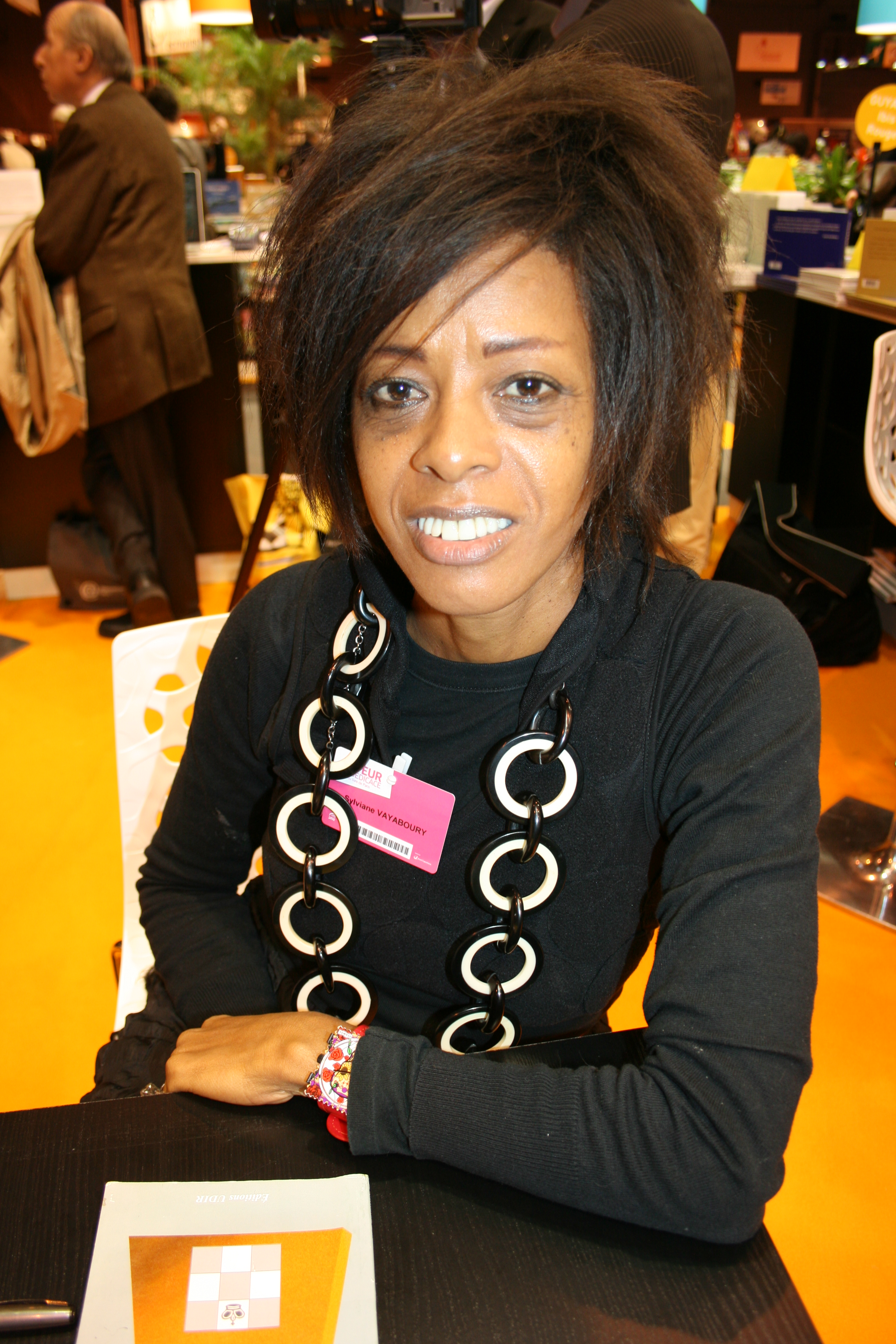
- The writer Sylviane Vayaboury at the 2011 Paris Book Fair.
- Born: 20 April 1960 (age 66); Cayenne, French Guiana, France
- Occupation: Writer

Sylviane Vayaboury (born 20 April 1960) is a French Guianese writer.

== Biography ==
Vayaboury was born in 1960 in Cayenne, the capital of French Guiana, to an Indo-Guadeloupean father and a Guianese mother. She was raised by an aunt and uncle whom she considered her adoptive grandparents, growing up in Guadeloupe, and in Fort-de-France, Martinique, as well as in French Guiana, and she was never able to build a substantial relationship with her parents, with whom she only reconnected later in their lives.

After finishing secondary school in 1978, Vayaboury attended a normal school and became a teacher. She then moved to France, where she lived for 15 years until 2005, when she returned to French Guiana. She continued to work as a teacher in France, receiving specialized training to assist children with disabilities.

Vayaboury began her writing career after the death of the adoptive grandparents who raised her. She is the author of two novels: Rue Lallouette prolongée, published in 2006, and La Crique, published in 2009. Her first book, Rue Lallouette prolongée, is a semi-autobiographical work that traces a path between the Antilles, French Guiana, and France. She counts among her influences Aimé Césaire, Patrick Chamoiseau, and Maryse Condé.

== Works ==
- Rue Lallouette prolongée (2006)
- La Crique (2009)
