= Justin Catayée =

French politician (1916–1962)

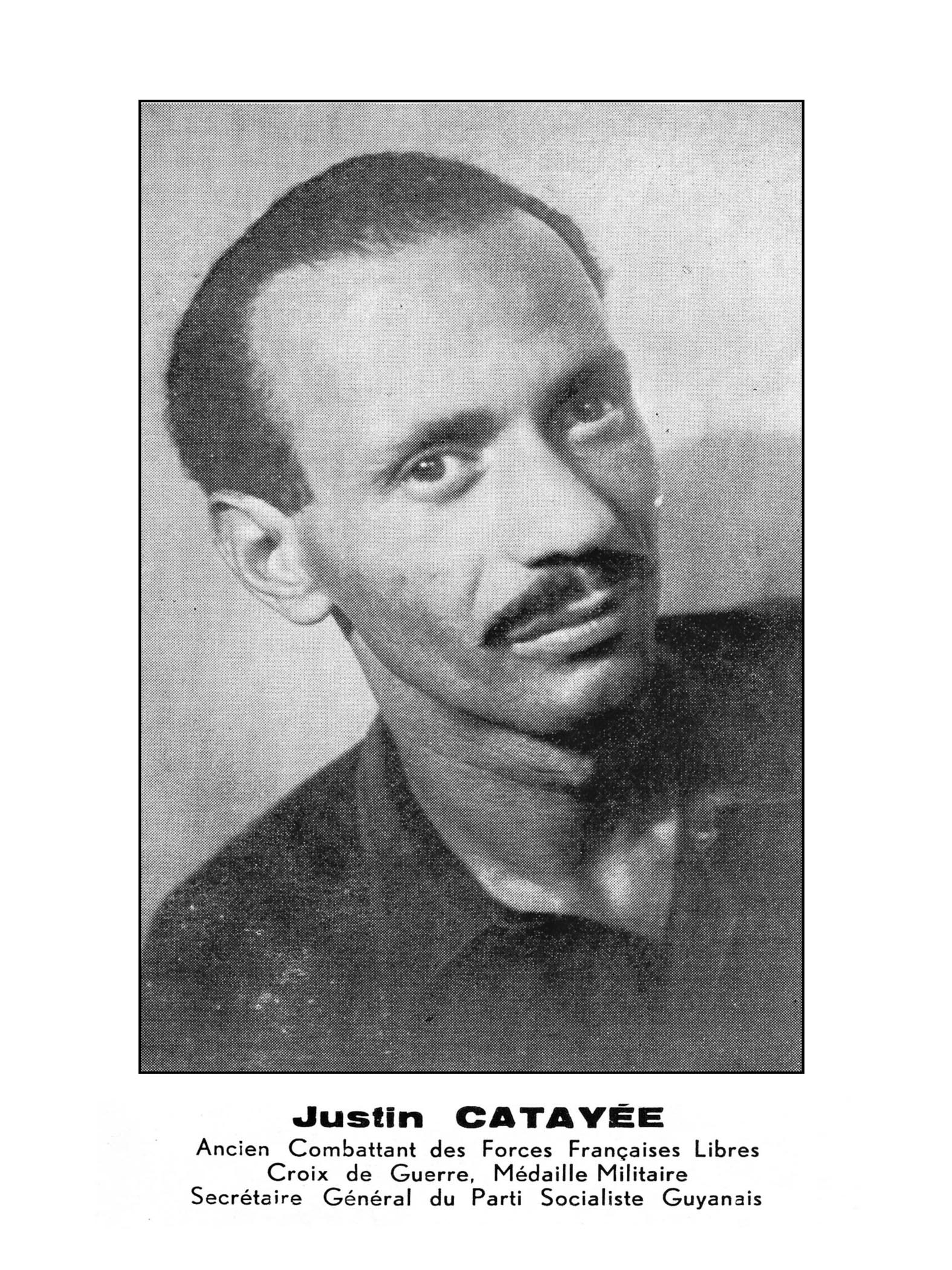

Member of the National Assembly for Guiana
- In office 30 November 1958 – June 1962
- Succeeded by: Léopold Héder

Personal details
- Born: 30 May 1916 Cayenne, French Guiana
- Died: 22 June 1962 (aged 46) Dos d'Âne, Guadeloupe
- Party: French Section of the Workers' International (1951–1956); Guianese Socialist Party (from 1956)

Justin Catayée (Guianese Creole French: Jisten Kataye; 30 May 1916 – 22 June 1962) was a French politician who served in the French National Assembly from 1958 to 1962 and was the founder of the Guianese Socialist Party and fought in World War II. He was born in Cayenne, French Guiana, and died in the crash of Air France Flight 117 into a mountain in Guadeloupe on 22 June 1962.

== Early life ==
Catayée was born in Cayenne, French Guiana on 30 May 1916; the fifth of six children of immigrants from Martinique. He studied at the Lycée Schoeler in Fort-de-France on a scholarship. In 1937 he married Germaine Terosiet, the daughter of his landlord, who was pregnant with his child, they went on to have four children together. Catayée took over running a bakery his grandfather had established in Saint-Pierre, Saint Pierre and Miquelon before founding a road transport company that failed.

== Military service ==
Catayée was drafted at Fort-de-France in September 1939 at the outset of the Second World War. He was rejected due to a cataract in his left eye but was keen to serve and continued to report to the recruitment office. Catayée was accepted into the Corps Francs d'Afrique on 12 December 1942 and fought in Tunisia with its 1st battalion. He was selected for officer training but found this training staff racist and deserted to join the main Free French forces in June 1943. He served with the 4th Engineer Company as a tank driver in Italy, including in attacks on the Hitler Line. At Sant'Ambrogio sul Garigliano he was commended for keeping the advance moving under heavy mortar fire and for the capture of seven German prisoners.

After advancing to Rome Catayée was deployed to Provence, France, in August 1944 with the 1st Free French Division that liberated Lyon and Burgundy. He worked in reconnaissance, mine clearing and fortification. Catayée was wounded in action at Belfort on 8 October, with shrapnel in his right shoulder, while clearing a German booby trap under fire. He commended and won promotion to sergeant-major for his actions. After the end of the war in Europe he was demobilised on 4 July 1945. He was awarded the Croix de Guerre 1939–1945 with silver star, the commemorative medal for voluntary service in Free France, the Colonial Medal with "Tunisia" bar, the 1939–1945 Commemorative war medal with clasps for Tunisia, Italy and Liberation and the Médaille militaire.

== Later life ==
After the war Catayée became a teacher in French Guiana. He founded the lcoal branch of the French Section of the Workers' International in October 1951 and in 1956 founded the Guianese Socialist Party. He won municipal elections in 1953 and became the first French Guianian teacher to be elected to the French National Assembly in 1958. While serving as deputy to the assembly he was killed in the 22 June 1962 crash of Air France Flight 117 in Guadaloupe.
