= Confédération des Petites et Moyennes Entreprises =

Union of employers in France

The Confédération des Petites et Moyennes Entreprises (CPME), formerly known as the Confédération Générale des Petites et Moyennes Entreprises (CGPME; English: General Confederation of Small and Medium Companies) is a union of employers in France.

== Overview ==
It was created in 1944 by Leon Gingembre, who was Chairman until 1978. He was followed by René Bernasconi (1978–1990), Lucien Rebuffel (1990–2000), Jacques Freidel (2000–2002). Its current Chairman is Jean-François Roubaud (since 2002).

It has 500,000 members. It is affiliated to the Economic and Social Council, the Conseil National de Crédit, and Pacte PME International.

Contrarily to the MEDEF, it aims at representing small business owners.
