= Gabriel Serville =

French Guianan politician (1959–2026)

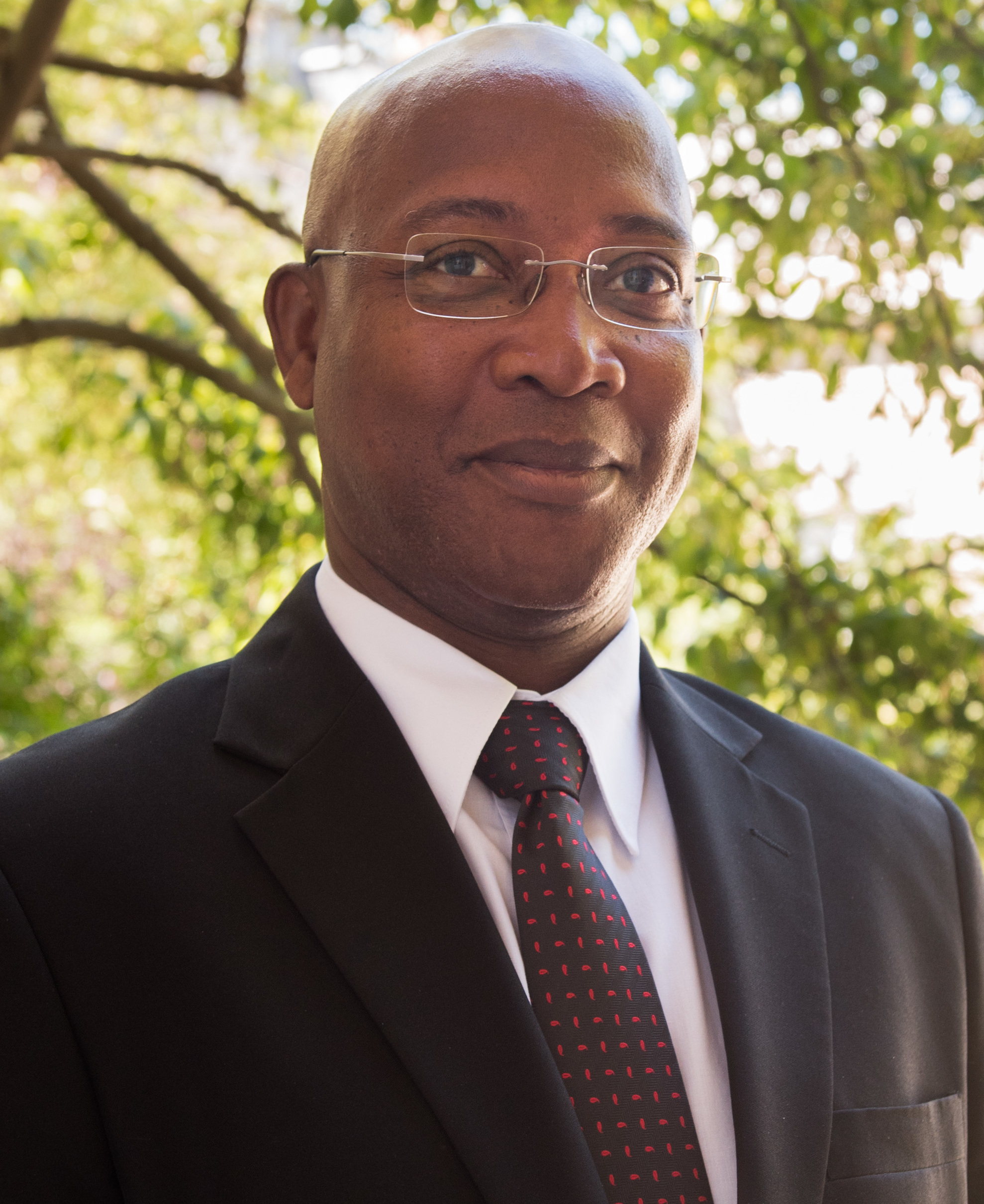
- Serville in 2017

President of the Assembly of French Guiana
- In office 2 July 2021 – 30 September 2026
- Preceded by: Rodolphe Alexandre
- Succeeded by: Jean-Paul Fereira (acting)

Member of the National Assembly for French Guiana's 1st constituency
- In office 20 June 2012 – 1 August 2021
- Preceded by: Audrey Marie
- Succeeded by: Carine Sinaï Bossou

Mayor of Matoury
- In office 4 April 2014 – 6 September 2017
- Preceded by: Jean-Pierre Roumillac
- Succeeded by: Serge Smock

Member of the Assembly of French Guiana
- In office 21 March 2010 – 17 June 2012

Personal details
- Born: 27 September 1959 Cayenne, French Guiana, France
- Died: 30 September 2026 (aged 67) Cayenne, French Guiana, France
- Party: Péyi Guyane (2018–2026)
- Other political affiliations: Guianese Socialist Party (2008–2017); Democratic Forces of Guiana (until 2008)

Gabriel Serville (27 September 1959 – 30 September 2026) was a French Guianan politician who served as President of the Assembly of French Guiana from 2021 until his death in 2026. A founding member and former leader of Péyi Guyane, he represented French Guiana's 1st constituency in the National Assembly from 2012 until his resignation in 2021. Prior to entering politics, Serville was a mathematics teacher and later principal of a vocational high school.

== Early life ==
Serville was born in Cayenne on 27 September 1959. His father was from Saint Lucia. Professionally, he was a mathematics teacher.

== Political career ==
Serville was first elected to the Member of French National Assembly on 20 June 2012. He served as mayor of Matoury from 2014 to 2017. He was a member of the Guianese Socialist Party from 2008 until 30 September 2017. In 2018, he founded Péyi Guyane.

For the 2021 regional elections, Péyi Guyane formed a union with La France Insoumise and Génération.s. Serville represented the union in the elections. On 2 July 2021, he was elected President of the French Guianese Assembly. He resigned his seat in the National Assembly on 1 August 2021.

He supported having French Guiana join the Caribbean Community. The remains of Kalina people, which were held in French national collections since 1892, were returned to French Guiana in 2026 with the support of Serville.

== Other activities ==
Serville was a member of UNITE – Parliamentary Network to End HIV/AIDS, Viral Hepatitis and Other Infectious Diseases since 2019.

== Illness and death ==
Serville was unable to work starting in October 2024 due to an illness and had to perform his duties as president remotely. He was in France for medical treatment until returning to French Guiana on 15 June 2025. Following his return, he revealed that he had been diagnosed with cancer but would continue to serve as president.

On 27 September 2026, his 67th birthday, Serville was hospitalized at the University Hospital Centre of French Guiana in Cayenne and died three days later.
