= Elections in Serbia and Montenegro =

The Federal Republic of Yugoslavia was a union between Serbia and Montenegro which had existed between 1992 and 2003. It was reconstituted as the State Union of Serbia and Montenegro in 2003. In 2006, the state broke up into the two independent states of Serbia and Montenegro.

== Federal Republic of Yugoslavia ==
Elections on a federal level were regularly held to elect the President of the Federal Republic of Yugoslavia as well as the Federal Assembly of the Federal Republic of Yugoslavia.

== State Union of Serbia and Montenegro ==
The Assembly of Serbia and Montenegro (Skupština Srbije i Crne Gore) had 126 members who served four-year terms, 91 from Serbia and 35 from Montenegro.

The first parliament was chosen in February 1993 by the members of the parliament of the former Federal Republic of Yugoslavia, and the members of the parliaments of Serbia and of Montenegro. The seats were divided up among political parties in proportion to the number of their seats in these two parliaments, so that each time one of the parliaments was re-elected, the composition of the federal parliament changed. The president of Serbia and Montenegro was elected by the parliament.

It was intended that direct elections for the Assembly of Serbia and Montenegro would be held in 2007, but the break-up of the state ended this possibility.

== See also ==
- Republic of Serbia (1990–2006)
  - Elections in Serbia
- Republic of Montenegro (1990–2006)
  - Elections in Montenegro
