= Eddy Gaumont =

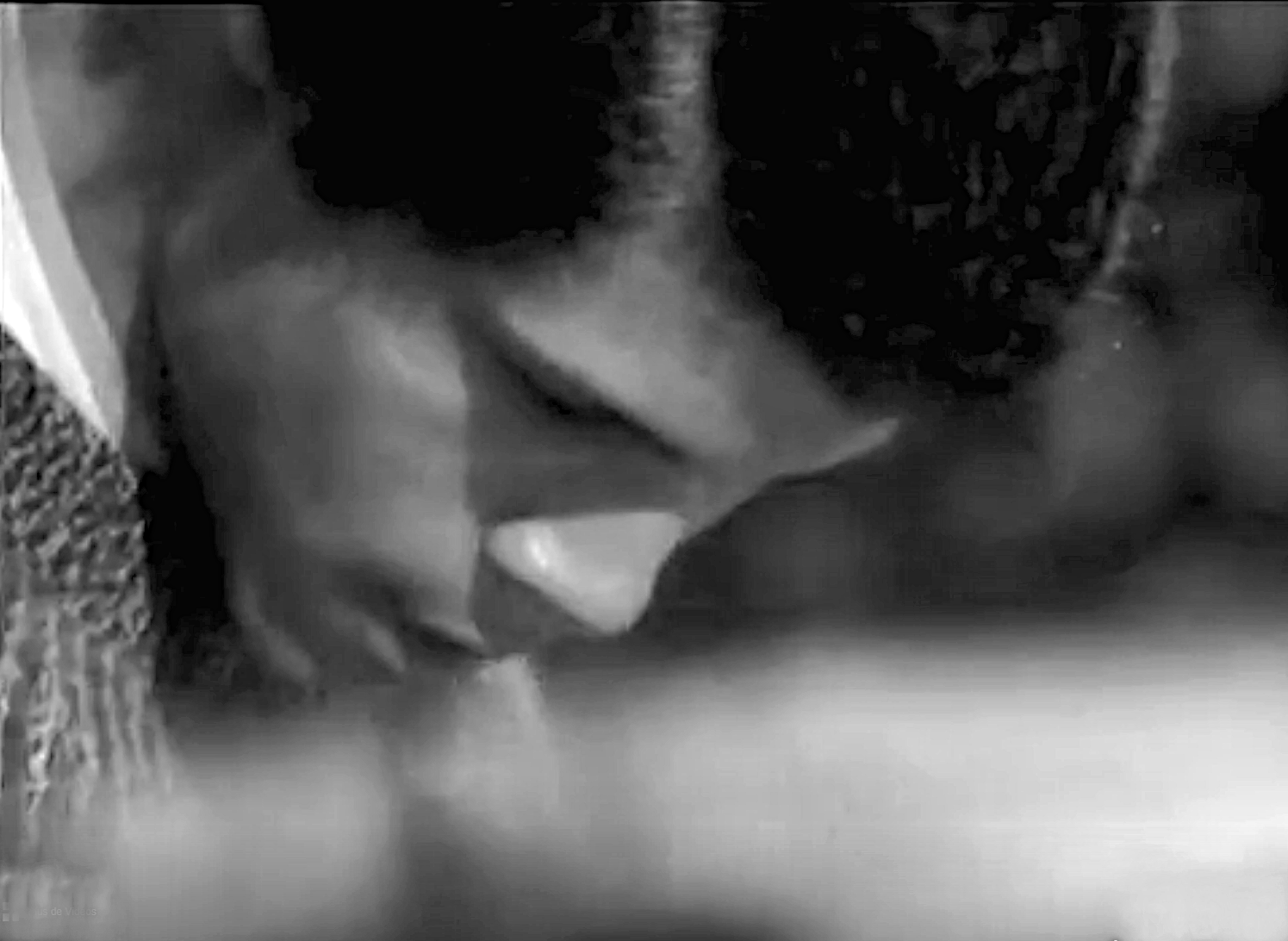

Background information
- Born: 14 August 1946; Cayenne, French Guiana
- Died: 22 November 1971 (aged 25) Paris, France
- Genres: Jazz; Avant-garde
- Instruments: Drums; Violin

Eddy Gaumont (born Édouard Jean-Marie Émile Gaumont on 14 August 1946 in Cayenne; died on 22 November 1971 in Paris) was a drummer of jazz and free-jazz.

== Biography ==
Eddy Gaumont is the sixth of nine siblings. He is the son of the politician Édouard Gaumont and of Josèphe Madeleine Polycarpe. The family left native Guyana to settle permanently in the Paris region at the beginning of the 1950s. Eddy grew up in a family where music held an important place, his younger sister Joëlle Gaumont is a classical concert pianist and his younger brother Dominique Gaumont was a guitarist. Eddy enrolled at the Versailles Conservatory in 1958 where he chose the violin. It is there in music theory class that he will meet Jacques Thollot and with whom will collaborate on several experiments and albums. Eddy Gaumont studies the drums in parallel, which will become his favorite instrument. Eddy Gaumont left the conservatory at the age of nineteen. He learns the drums with drummer Kenny Clark.

In 1966 Eddy Gaumont joined the French free-jazz scene, and collaborated and recorded with the main musicians of this movement, including: Barney Wilen, Jacques Thollot, François Tusque, Jean-François Jenny-Clark, Michel Portal, Beb Guérin, Marion Brown ...

In 1969 he founded his own group, the "Synchro Rythmic Eclectic Language" with Joe Maka, Louis Xavier, the same one who took over the group after the death of its founder.

After a career of barely six years Eddy Gaumont died on 22 November 1971.

Gone too soon "Eddy Gaumont would surely have been the musician of the century" as Jacques Thollot said during an interview.

== TV and Radio Shows ==
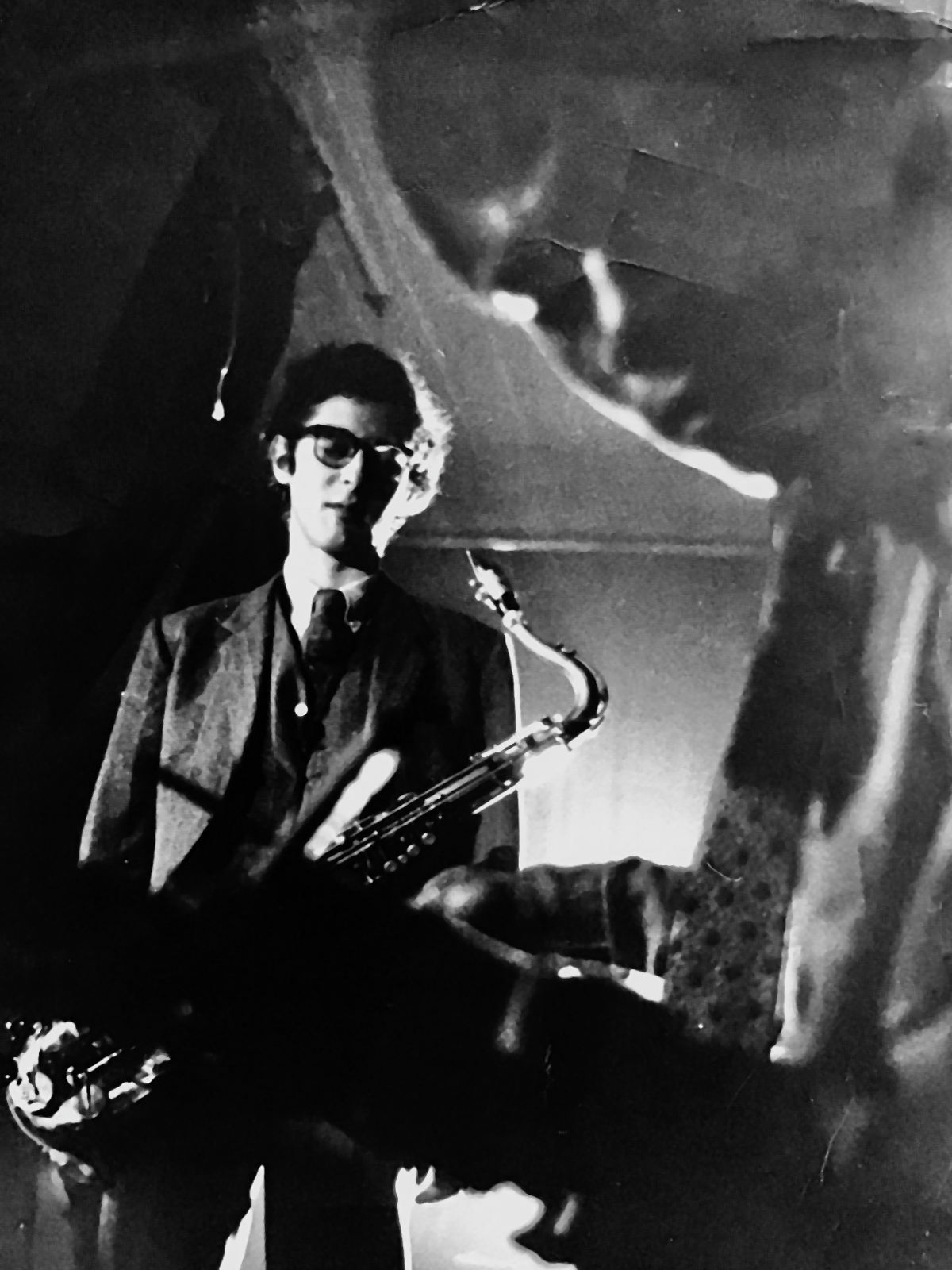
Eddy Gaumont with Barney Wilen in concert at HEC in Jouy en Josas, France – 24 November 1966

Eddy Gaumont participated several times in the program "Pop Club" of José Arthur, there is no testimony left. He participated in the French program Dim Dam Dom on 12 November 1967, there is a video available on YouTube which is the only testimony of a live performance by Eddy Gaumont.

== Discography, Movies Soundtracks ==
=== Participations[modifier | modifier le code] ===
- 1967 – collaboration with Michel Portal at the Music of the film Le Viol (The Immoral Moment) by Jacques Doniol-Valcroze.
- 1967 – François Tusques – La Reine Des Vampires – Eddy Gaumont plays violin.
- 1968 – Barney Wilen – Auto Jazz – Tragic Destiny of Lorenzo Bandini.
- The B-Music of Jean Rollin – Various Artists 1968–1979.
- Compilation 1975 – Jazz Meets The World.
- Jacques Thollot – Intramusique – Eddy Gaumont plays "prepared" piano.
