= Antoine Karam (French Guianan politician) =

French politician (born 1950)

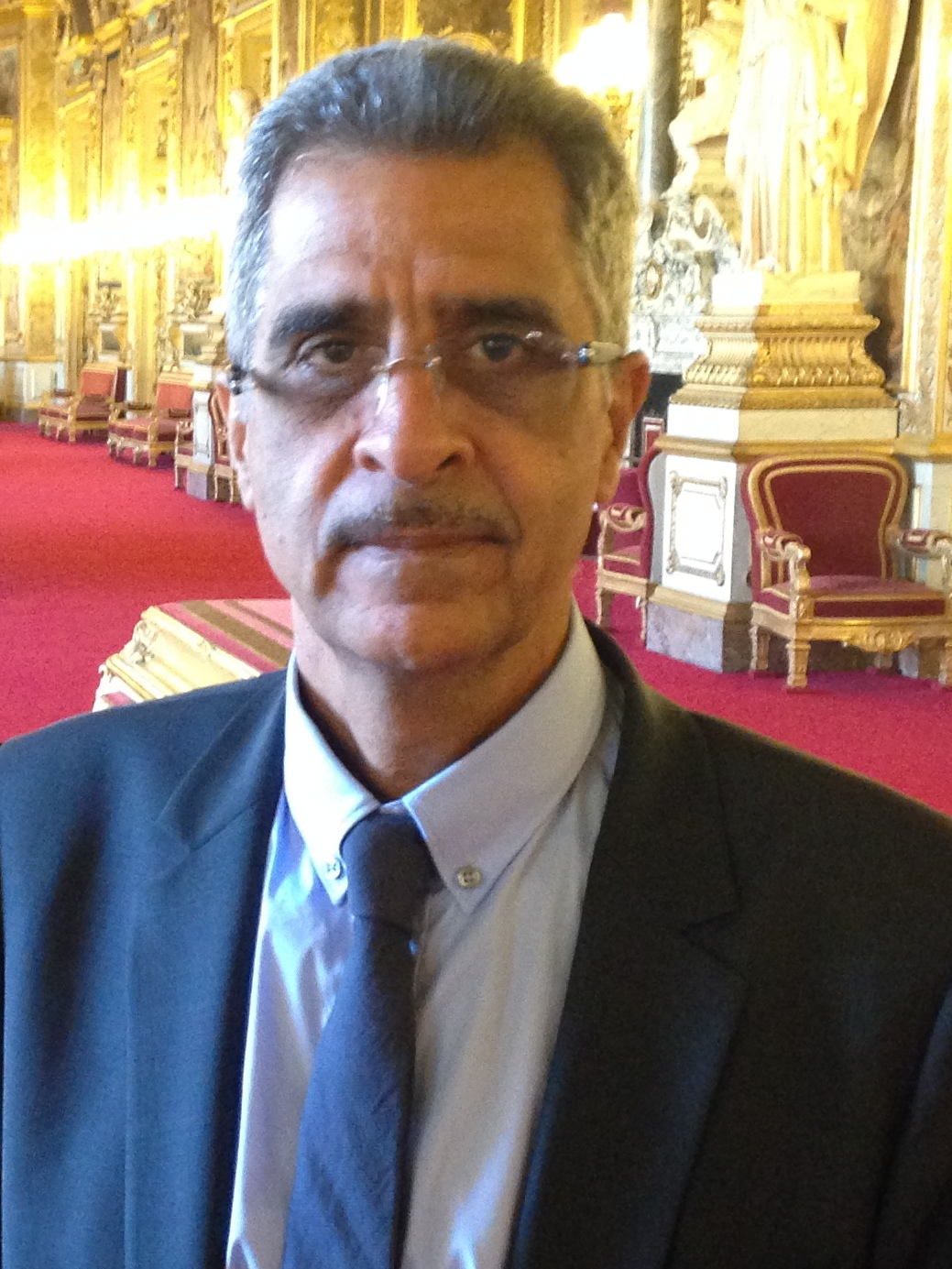
- Antoine Karam in 2014

Member of the French Senate for Guyane
- In office 1 October 2014 – 30 September 2020
- Preceded by: Jean-Étienne Antoinette
- Succeeded by: Marie-Laure Phinéra-Horth

4th President of the Regional Council of French Guiana
- In office 22 January 1992 – 26 January 2010
- Preceded by: Georges Othily
- Succeeded by: Rodolphe Alexandre

Personal details
- Born: 21 February 1950 (age 76) Cayenne, French Guiana
- Party: Guianese Socialist Party (2014-2017); La République En Marche! (after 2017)
- Education: Lycée Thiers
- Profession: Teacher

Antoine Karam (born 21 February 1950) served as the president of the Regional Council (Conseil régional) of French Guiana, a région d'outre-mer of France, from 1992 to 2010.

Karam was born to a Lebanese father and a Saint Lucian mother. He is a professor of history and he was president of the council from 22 January 1992 to 26 January 2010. As a member of the left-wing Guianese Socialist Party (PSG), allied to the French Socialist Party (PS), he is also French Guiana's single representative in the French Senate.

== Biography ==
Antoine Karam studied at Lycée Thiers in Marseille, then completed a master's degree in history on slavery in French Guiana. Now a history teacher, Antoine Karam teaches at Collège Paul Kapel, among other schools.

Antoine Karam was a city councilor in Cayenne (1977–2002) and a regional councilor in French Guiana (1983–86 and 1992–2010). He was also a general councilor in French Guiana (Cayenne-Nord-Est canton) from 1985 to 2015.

He was also head of the Sport of athletics League from 1977 to 1990: under his presidency, the first Rochambeau/Cayenne mini-marathon (known at the time as the Henri Bonheur Cup) was launched, as well as the first “Games of French Guiana” (May 1, 1979).

Antoine Karam was elected senator in the second round on September 28, 2014.

He is a member of the Guianese Socialist Party.
