= Jules Patient =

French politician (1905–1985)

Jules Patient (January 15, 1905 in Cayenne, French Guiana – July 27, 1985 in Cayenne) was a politician from French Guiana who served in the French Senate from 1948 to 1952.
