= René Jadfard =

French politician

René Jadfard (born 24 January 1899 in Cayenne, French Guiana; died 9 November 1947) was a politician from French Guiana who was elected to the French National Assembly in 1947, journalist and novelist.

He was killed in an airplane crash in 1947 when the small amphibious plane bringing him, the prefect Robert Vignon and the director of printing Monsieur Marsau crashed into the Sinnamary en route to Saint-Laurent. The pilot and the other two passengers were able to swim to safety and reach the palétuviers (mangroves) on the river bank, but Jadfard drowned. As with the death of Jean Galmot in 1928 tension was raised in the population but the funeral was conducted with great dignity.

A biography by the French Guianan politician Georges Othily: René Jadfard ou l'éclair d'une vie was published by Éditions caribéennes in 1989.

== Biography ==
The son of Henri Ferjusse Jadfard and Marie Caroline Noémie Tourville, René was born at 20 Rue Christophe Colomb in Cayenne. Jadfard fought in the 7th Artillery Regiment on the Maginot Line in 1939, and later as Captain Roch's deputy in the Resistance in the Pyrénées-Orientales. He died in a plane crash the year he became a member of parliament.

== Works ==
- Les Dieux de bronze Librairie de France 1928
- D'autres sujets Compiègne 1930
- Le cantique aux ténèbres Librairie de France 1930
- Les revendications coloniales et l'avenir de la France Paris 1930
- La France et les revendications coloniales allemandes Louis Querelle, Paris 1938
- Drôle d'assassin, Paris 1939, republished Editions Caraibéennes 1988
- L'assassin joue et perd Paris 1947, republished Editions Caraibéennes 1988
- Le télégramme de minuit Paris 1941, republished Editions Caraibéennes 1988
- Deux hommes et l'aventure Paris 1945, republished Editions Caraibéennes 1988
- Nuit de Cachiri - Récit guyanais Paris 1946, republished Editions Caraibéennes 1988
