= Élie Castor =

French politician (1943–1996)

Élie Castor (April 28, 1943, in Cayenne, French Guiana, France – June 16, 1996, in Clermont Ferrand, France) was a French politician from French Guiana who served in the French National Assembly from 1981 to 1993, representing the Guianese Socialist Party. Before entering politics he had worked as both a teacher and a policeman.

He was the author of several books, including 1981–1985 La gauche au pouvoir : Pour la Guyane : l'espoir, and a book on Félix Éboué (1984).
