= Henri Agarande =

French politician (1920–1983)

Henri Agarande (13 September 1920, in Fort-de-France, Martinique – 6 August 1983, in Cayenne) was a politician from Martinique who served and represented French Guiana in the French Senate from 1978–1980.

== Bibliography ==
- page on the French Senate website
