= Rodolphe Alexandre =

French politician (born 1953)

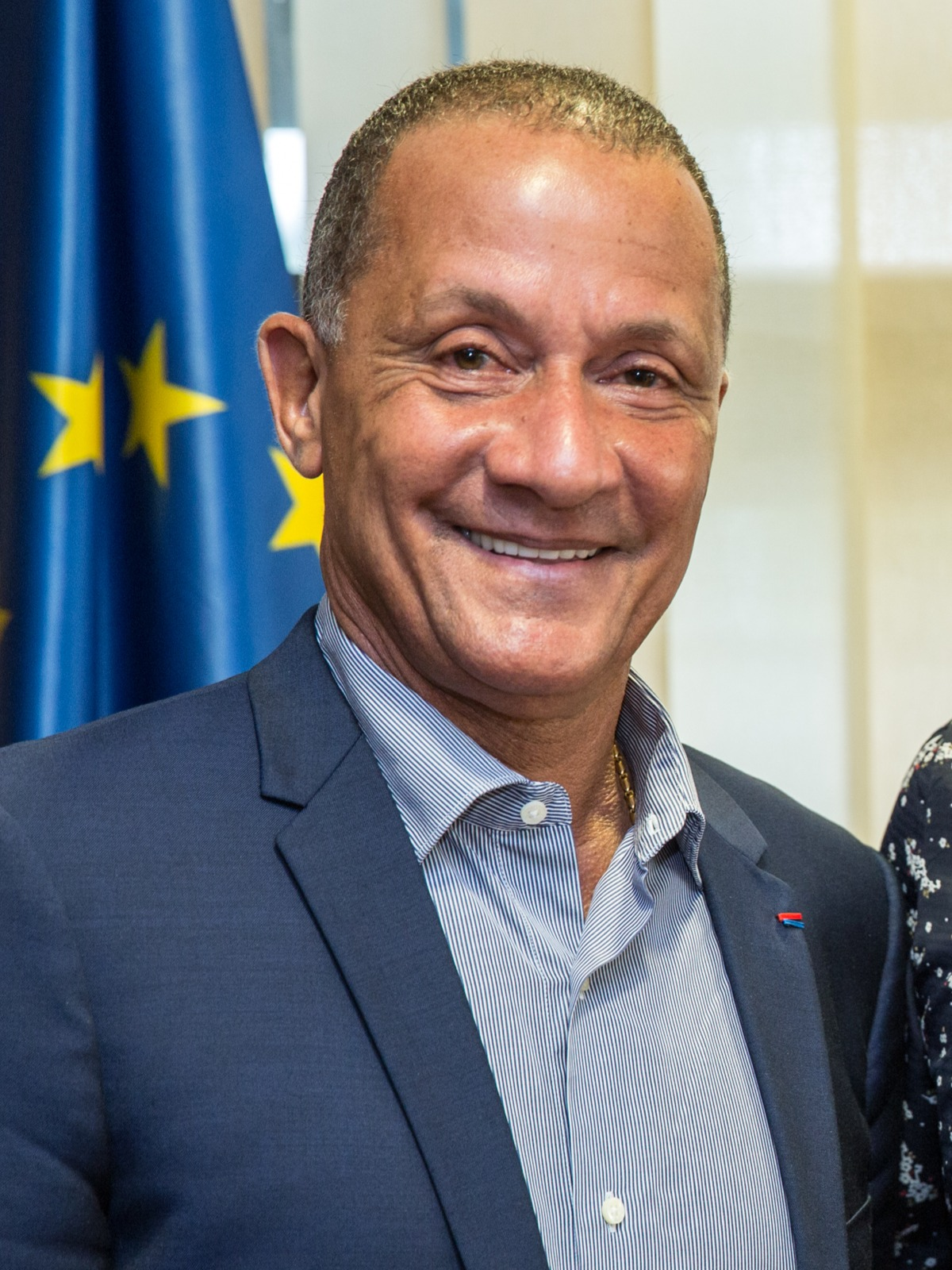
- Alexandre in 2017

5th President of the Regional Council of French Guiana
- In office 26 January 2010 – 2 July 2021
- Preceded by: Antoine Karam
- Succeeded by: Gabriel Serville

Mayor of Cayenne
- In office March 2008 – March 2010
- Preceded by: Jean-Claude Lafontaine
- Succeeded by: Marie-Laure Phinéra-Horth

Personal details
- Born: 26 September 1953 (age 72) Cayenne, French Guiana, France
- Party: Guiana Rally (since 2010); Guianese Socialist Party (1983–2008)

Rodolphe Alexandre (born 26 September 1953 in Cayenne) is a French politician from French Guiana. The former Mayor of Cayenne, he was president of the Guiana Assembly, the deliberative assembly of French Guiana, since its establishment on 1 January 2016 until 2021. He was president of the Regional Council of French Guiana from 26 March 2010, till the Regional Council and General Council were replaced by the one body, the Guiana Assembly, on 1 January 2016.

== Early life ==
Having completed his secondary education at Felix Eboue High School, he obtained a Master of history and geography at the University of Bordeaux III.

== Political career ==
He joined the Guianese Socialist Party (PSG) in 1983, when he became chief of staff in the General Council of Guyana (until 1988). He was then elected a municipal councillor of Cayenne in 1989, and then became its first deputy mayor in 1995. In 2001 he became President of the Communauté d'agglomération du Centre Littoral in Cayenne, which he did until 2012. He stated his rapprochement with the right wing of politics took place in the spring of 2006, mostly due to security policies after he stated there was a rise in crime. In the 2007 French presidential election he supported Nicolas Sarkozy, but was expelled from the party in January 2008. Antoine Karam expelled him on the grounds of having announced his candidacy for Mayor of Cayenne despite the party supporting the current mayor, who was running for reelection that cycle. This prompted him to create his own movement, Guyane 73, which later became Guyane Rassemblement.

In December 2015 he became President of the Regional Council of French Guiana, with 35 votes to 15.

== Honours and awards ==
In 2010 he was named a Knight of the Legion of Honour, and was then promoted to officer by a decree on 31 December 2020.
