= Georges Patient =

French Guianan politician

Senator for French Guiana
- Incumbent
- Assumed office 1 October 2008
- Parliamentary group: SOC (2008-2017); LREM (since 2017)

Mayor of Mana
- In office 20 March 1989 – 10 November 2017
- Preceded by: Joseph Pavant
- Succeeded by: Albéric Benth

Personal details
- Born: 1 April 1949 (age 77) Cayenne; French Guiana
- Party: DVG
- Occupation: Financial consultant

Georges Patient (born 1 April 1949) is a French politician who has been serving as a member of the Senate of France since 2008, representing the territory of French Guiana. Since 2017, he has been affiliated with the La République En Marche (LREM) parliamentary group. He previously served as the mayor of Mana from 1989 to 2017.

== Political career ==
In the Senate, Patient has been serving on the Finance Committee and the Committee on European Affairs.

In 2026, the Senate overwhelmingly approved Patient's proposal to allow oil and gas exploration in French overseas territories.

== Honours ==
- : Chevalier du Mérite agricole (2000)
- : Chevalier de l’Ordre national du Mérite

== Links ==
- Page on the French Senate website
