= Raymond Tarcy =

French Guianan politician (1936–2019)

Senator from French Guiana
- In office 28 September 1980 – 1 October 1989

Mayor of Saint-Laurent-du-Maroni
- In office March 1971 – March 1983

Personal details
- Born: 18 November 1936 Saint-Laurent-du-Maroni, French Guiana
- Died: 3 July 2019 (aged 81)
- Party: PS

Raymond Tarcy (18 November 1936, French Guiana – 3 July 2019) was a politician from French Guiana who was elected to the French Senate in 1980. He previously had served as mayor of his hometown of Saint-Laurent-du-Maroni for twelve years. The Lycée Raymond Tarcy in Saint-Laurent-du-Maroni has been named after Tarcy.
