= Decolonization and Social Emancipation Movement =

Decolonization and Social Emancipation Movement Mouvement de décolonisation et d'émancipation sociale
- Leader: Fabien Canavy
- Founded: 1991
- Headquarters: 21 Rue Maissin, Cayenne
- Newspaper: Rot Kozé (Notre cause)
- Ideology: Guianese nationalism Anti-colonialism; Marxism
- Political position: Far-left
- National affiliation: Democratic and Republican Left group
- Colours: Orange, Green
- National Assembly (Guiana seats): 1 / 2
- Senate (Guiana seats): 0 / 2
- Assembly of French Guiana: 0 / 55

Website
- mdesguyane.org

Flag of the French Guiana, supported by the MDES

The Decolonization and Social Emancipation Movement (French: Mouvement de décolonisation et d'émancipation sociale, MDES) is a pro-independence political party in French Guiana.

== Platform ==
The principal platform of the party is the demand for independence of Guiana, currently an overseas region and one of the 26 regions of France. They also consider the possibility of becoming an overseas territory, which is different from an overseas region.

== Election participation ==
In 1998, the MDES obtained 3 seats in the regional elections with 8.6% of the vote. However, in the 2004 regional elections, the MDES list put forward by Maurice Pindard obtained only 6.55% of the vote and no seats. In 2012 parliamentary elections, the MDES obtained 17.30% of votes.

Alain Tien-Liong, who represented the Cayenne South-West constituency in the body, served as president of the General Council of French Guiana from 2004 to 2015.

In the 2022 French legislative election, MDES candidate Jean-Victor Castor was elected to represent French Guiana's 1st constituency in the National Assembly.

== Ròt Kozé ==
The party runs a newspaper Ròt Kozé (a French Guianese Creole term that means "Other speech"; French: Autre discours), which advocates for autonomy for French Guiana.
