= Democratic Forces of Guiana =

Political party in French Guiana

The Democratic Forces of Guiana (French: Forces democratiques de Guyane, FDG) is a centrist and social-liberal political party in the French overseas région of French Guiana, in South America. The FDG had one Senator until the 2008 elections, Georges Othily who sat in the RDSE group in the Senate.
