= Léopold Héder =

French politician\ (1918–1978)

Léopold Héder (born August 16, 1918, in Cayenne, French Guiana, and died June 9, 1978, in Cambo-les-Bains, France) was a socialist politician from French Guiana who served in the French National Assembly from 1962 to 1967 and in the French Senate from 1971 to 1978. He presented himself as successor to Justin Catayée.
