= Georges Othily =

French Guianese politician (1944–2017)

Senator for French Guiana
- In office 2 October 1989 – 30 September 2008
- Parliamentary group: SOC (1989-1992); RDE (1992-1995)); RDSE (1995-2008)

Personal details
- Born: 7 January 1944 Cayenne, French Guiana
- Died: 18 December 2017 (aged 73) Cayenne, French Guiana
- Party: LGM

Georges Othily (7 January 1944 – 18 December 2017) was a French Guianese politician who was elected to the French Senate in 1989. His biography of René Jadfard, René Jadfard ou l'éclair d'une vie, was published by Éditions caribéennes in 1989.
