= 2021 French Green Party presidential primary =

← 2016	28 September 2021
- Turnout: 85.41%
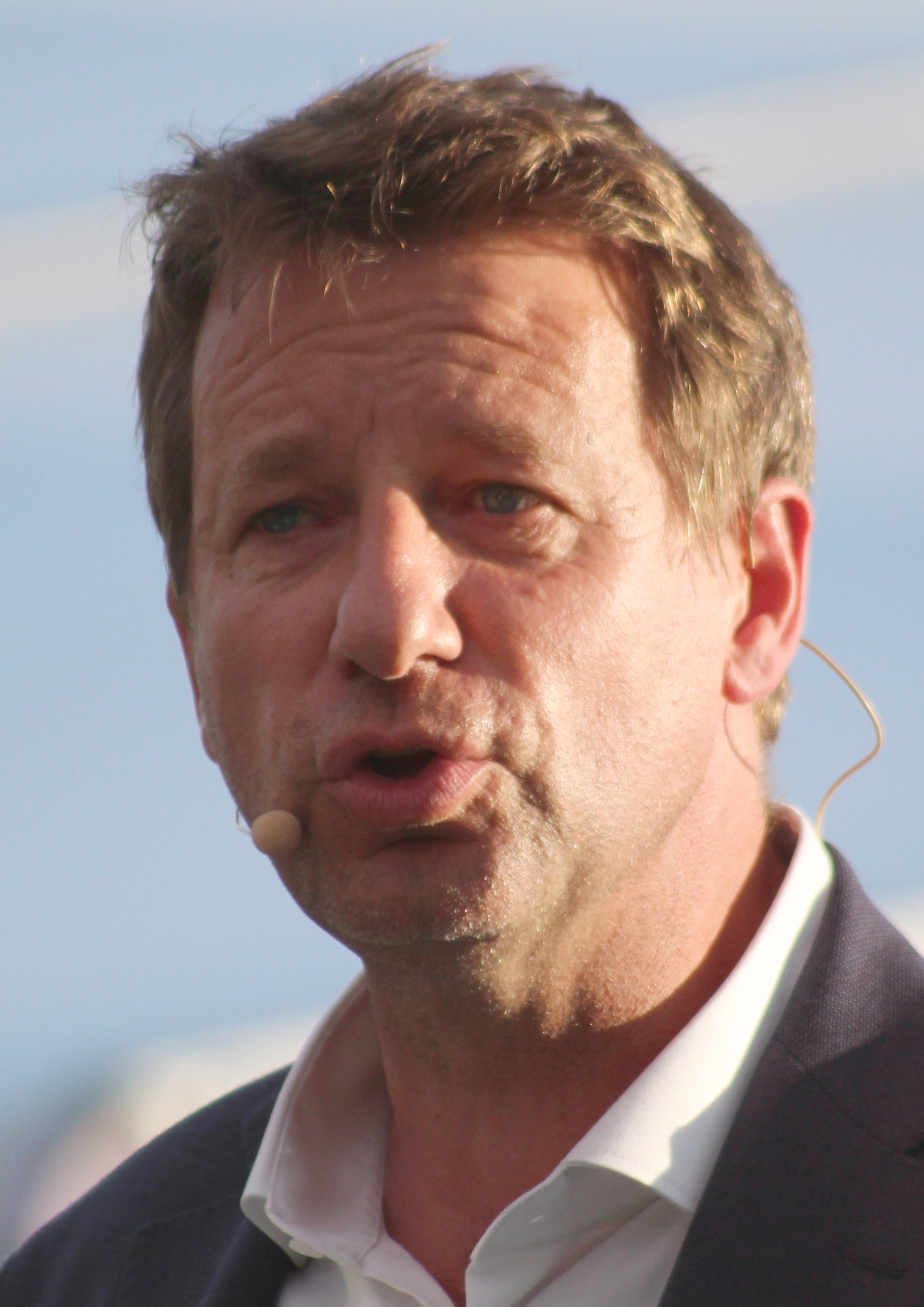

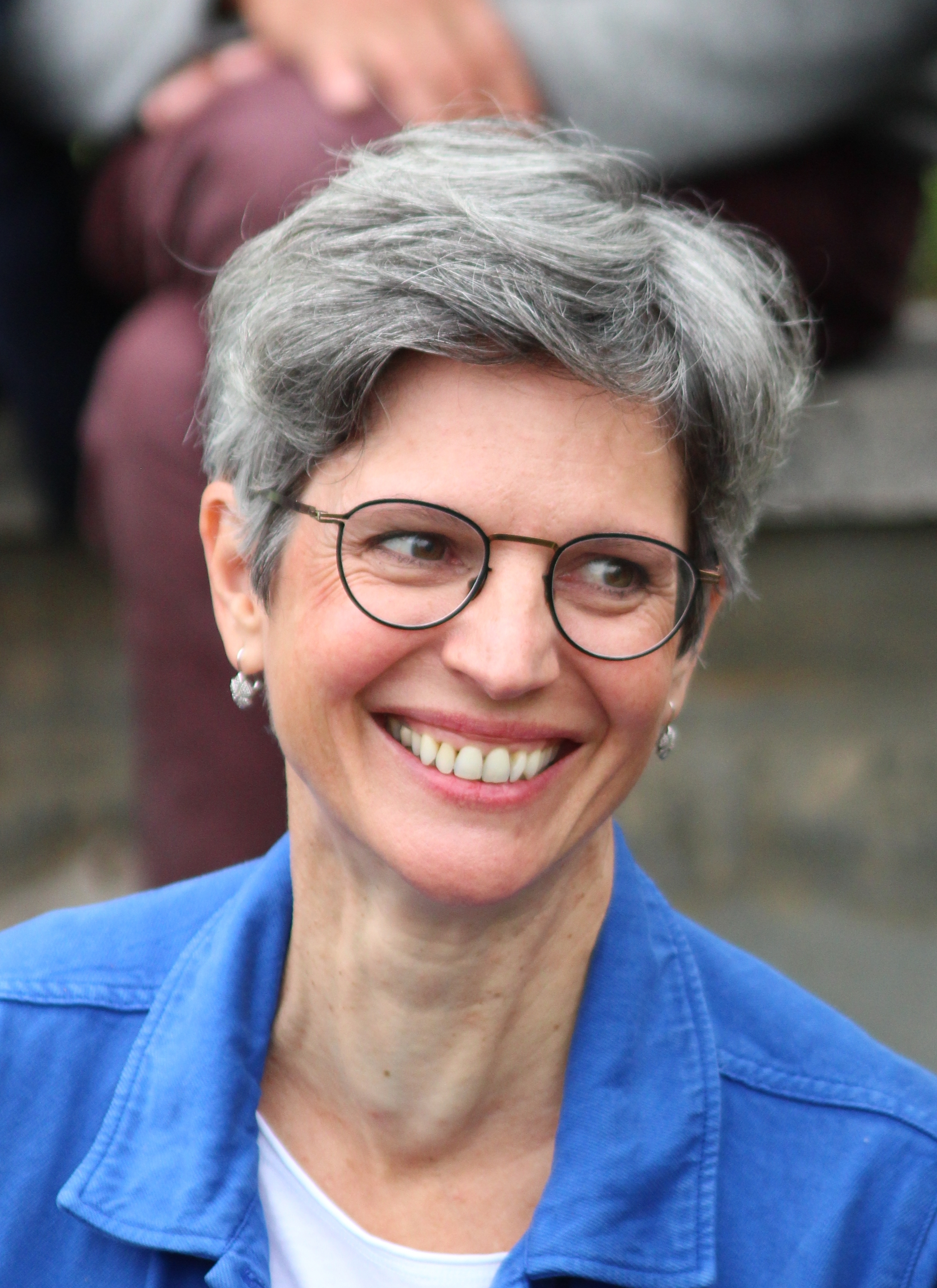
Candidate	Yannick Jadot	Sandrine Rousseau
Party	Europe Ecology – The Greens	Europe Ecology – The Greens
Percentage	51.03%	48.97%

The 2021 Ecology primary took place on 19 and 28 September 2021 to nominate the candidate of the Ecologist Pole electoral coalition for the 2022 French presidential election. The primary was open to any French citizen over the age of 16, who paid a small fee and agreed to the coalition's charter. 122,670 voters were registered, which was 7 times more than in the 2016 primary, with over 85% taking part in the two rounds of voting.

There were five candidates in the running:

- Yannick Jadot
- Sandrine Rousseau
- Delphine Batho
- Éric Piolle
- Jean-Marc Governatori

The first round was close, with 4 of the 5 candidates receiving over 20% of the vote. Jadot, the frontrunner, and Rousseau progressed to the second round, while the others were eliminated. On 28 September, Jadot narrowly won the second round, with 51.03% of the voteand became the nominee.

== Electoral System ==
=== Registration ===
Applications of candidates and their sponsorships were submitted in July 2021.

Any citizen over 16 could register to vote in the primary before September 12 through paying €2 and the signing of a "charter of ecological values".

The primary took place in two rounds, with the first round taking place from 16 to 19 September, and then the second round from 25 to 28 September. 122,670 voters were registered, a number well above the 17,000 registered for the 2016 primary. Voting for each round took place on an online secure platform.

=== Interference ===
Several far-right figures, in particular Damien Rieu and Sébastien Chenu of the National Rally, announced that they wanted to disrupt the primary by encouraging people to vote for Rousseau, in order to stop Jadot winning the nomination.

To stop any interference, registration was done online on a dedicated platform, and required providing an email and phone number that could not be reused. Similarly, people who used the same bank card more than three times in a row to pay their participation were suspended, which led to the exclusion of 1,464 people, 1.18% of people registered.

The organisers of the primary believed that the election was not disrupted or hacked, but, nevertheless, "nobody is able to know if there was a real impact of the voters of the extreme right on this primary" according to a researcher interviewed by Liberation. The election provider said after the first round that “the electronic voting system [...] offered an excellent level of security”.

== Candidates ==
Candidate	Party	Political office at the time of the campaign	Notes
Delphine Batho	GÉ	Member of Parliament for Deux-Sèvres (since 2013)	Minister of Ecology from 2012 to 2013, president of Génération écologie since 2018, she is on the Ecology Emergency list in the 2019 European elections. She presented themselves as neither left nor right, framing her campaign around "degrowth".
Jean-Marc Governatori	CÉ	Councilor of Nice (since 2020)	Co-president of Cap Écologie with Corinne Lepage, he announced his candidacy on 3 July 2021, presenting himself as a candidate for “ecology at the center”.
Yannick Jadot	EELV	MEP (since 2009)	After winning the 2016 environmentalist primary and participating in the 2017 presidential election, he stepped down to support Benoît Hamon. He announced his candidacy on 30 June 2021.
Éric Piolle	EELV	Mayor of Grenoble (since 2014)	In 2014, he was elected mayor of Grenoble, becoming the only environmentalist at the head of a French city of more than 100,000 inhabitants. Reelected in 2020 in the context of a “green wave”, he is a symbol of EELV municipalities. He announced his candidacy on 29 June 2021.
Sandrine Rousseau	EELV	None	National spokesperson for EÉLV, she withdraws from political life following the Denis Baupin affair, in which she is one of the complainants, then founded the association En Parler. After re-enrolling in EÉLV in September 2020, she announced her candidacy for primary in November 2020. She claims to be an ecofeminist.

Corinne Lepage announced on 8 July the exclusion of Cap21 (not registered in the statutes of the primary as Cap ecology following its merger with the AEI) from the process of organizing the primary, due to differences on the commitments linked to the ballot as well as to questions of “secularism and the Republic”. Jean-Marc Governatori, who chairs Cap ecology with her, announced his candidacy on 3 July 2021, presenting himself as a candidate for “ecology at the center”. Deprived of sponsorships from Cap21, he did not receive the 28 supporting votes necessary for the validation of his application by the deadline of 12 July. Deeming himself wronged, Governatori sued the Union for Ecology in 2022, the association which organized the primary: on 29 July the Bobigny court ordered it to pay €2,000 in compensation to Cap21 as well as 'to the AEI; the court also orders the suspension of the exclusion of Cap21, and consequently the validation of the candidacy of Governatori for the primary. Although the reinstatement of her party allowed Jean-Marc Governatori to obtain sponsorships, Lepage said that she did not support any candidate in the first round.

== Debates ==
The first debate was organised on France Inter on 5 September, in partnership with France Info and Le Monde.

Two other debates were broadcast by the LCI channel, in collaboration with the daily Le Figaro and the online media Loopsider. The former was done before the first round on 8 September, and the latter was on 22 September for the second round.

Mediapart organised a debate between the five candidates in its program broadcast online À l'air libre.

== Polls ==
Voters were asked who they thought the best candidate would be. The percentages in bold indicate the top two candidates who would go to a second round, if needed.

Polling Firm	Fieldwork Date	Sample		Rousseau	Piolle	Jadot	Batho	Governatori
Odoxa	15–16 Sept	1,005	All French voters	**22%**	9%	**37%**	19%	7%
Odoxa	15–16 Sept	241	Left-wing voters	**22%**	12%	**40%**	19%	3%
Odoxa	15–16 Sept	67	EELV voters	**25%**	11%	**42%**	17%	1%
Ipsos-Sopra Steria	2–3 Sept	925	All French voters	**18%**	11%	**47%**	16%	8%
Ipsos-Sopra Steria	2–3 Sept	?	EELV voters	11%	7%	**69%**	8%	4%

== Results ==
Candidates	Party	First round		Second round	
Candidates	Party	Voice	%	Voice	%
Yannick Jadot	EELV	29,534	27.70	52,210	51.03
Sandrine Rousseau	EELV	26,801	25.14	50,098	48.97
Delphine Batho	GÉ	23,801	22.32		
Eric Piolle	EELV	23,767	22.29		
Jean-Marc Governatori	CÉ	2,501	2.35		
Registered		122,675	100.00	122,675	100.00
Turnout		106,622	86.91	104,772	85.41
Filled Ballots		106,404	99.80	102,308	97.65
Blank Ballots		218	0.20	2,464	2.35

=== Endorsements ===
Batho and Piolle did not endorse either candidate in the second round. Governatori endorsed Jadot.
