= Ecologist Pole =

French political coalition

Ecologist Pole Pôle écologiste
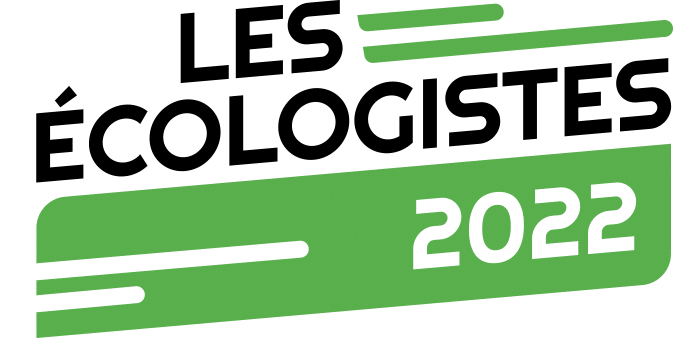
- Abbreviation: PE
- Leader: Yannick Jadot (for the 2022 presidential election)
- Founded: August 2020
- Ideology: Green politics Political ecology Progressivism
- Political position: Centre-left to left-wing
- National affiliation: New Popular Front
- European affiliation: European Greens
- European Parliament group: Greens/EFA
- International affiliation: Global Greens
- Member parties: The Ecologists; Génération.s; Ecology Generation
- Former members: Movement of Progressives; Ecology of the Centre; Cap21; Cap Écologie; The New Democrats
- Colours: Green
- National Assembly: 23 / 577
- Senate: 11 / 348
- European Parliament: 10 / 79

Website
- lesecologistes.fr

Ecologist Pole (French: Pôle écologiste, PE) is a French green political coalition launched in August 2020. This alliance followed the 2020 municipal elections, in which several large cities were won by lists led by green candidates.

== History ==
=== Formation ===
Initiated by Europe Ecology – The Greens and its national secretary Julien Bayou, the Ecologist Pole is also composed at its launch of:

- Génération.s, founded by Benoît Hamon and coordinated by Sophie Taillé-Pollian and Benjamin Lucas,
- Ecology Generation, chaired by Delphine Batho,
- Cap21, founded and chaired by Corinne Lepage,
- Independent Ecological Alliance, founded and chaired by Jean-Marc Governatori,
- the Movement of Progressives, founded by Robert Hue and chaired by Sébastien Nadot.

This pole aims to present independent environmental lists in each region and canton during the next local elections scheduled for 2021 (regional and departmental)

On 18 December 2020, three parties (Ecology Generation, Cap21 and the Independent Ecological Alliance) formed a common coordination platform for an "ecology of government", "pragmatic and republican". These movements, which represent the moderate wing, wish to mark their opposition to possible alliances with La France Insoumise. In February 2021, Cap21 and the Independent Ecologist Alliance merged to launch Cap Écologie.

On 12 April 2021, the five formations of the Ecologist Pole are launching a participatory platform, "Les Écologistes 2022", in order to prepare a common project for the next presidential election. On 12 April, the committee of the Ecologist Pole announced the organization of a "primary ecology" to designate a common candidate for the presidential election of 2022.

=== 2021 regional elections ===
The strategy of the Ecologist Pole during the regional and departmental elections of June 2021 was not the same throughout the territory. If there was indeed an environmentalist list in each region, it could be either autonomous, or allied to the PS, or to LFI or to the whole of the left. In addition, out of seven regions, a member party of the pole did not participate in the list it carried (Cap Écologie allied with the PS in four regions and was autonomous in one; Génération.s allied with the rebellious in two regions).

In the first round, the lists presented or supported by the Ecologist Pole (left union lists included) achieve 13.09% of the vote. In four regions (Auvergne-Rhône-Alpes, Grand Est, Île-de-France and Pays de la Loire), the list led by an ecologist tops the lists on the left.

For the second round, the environmental lists merge with the other left lists in five regions but they are maintained in Brittany and Nouvelle-Aquitaine, for lack of agreements. Three regions where a union was formed in the first round with the PS, see the renewal of the list. The environmental lists are eliminated in Corsica, in Occitania (for lack of agreement) and despite its qualification for the second round in the PACA region, the list of union of the left and environmentalists withdraws to block the list of the National Rally arrived on your mind. At the end of this second round, the Ecologist Pole obtains 134 regional advisers (88 EÉLV, 18 ECO, 16 G.s, 8 GÉ and 4 CÉ) and 124 departmental advisers (99 EÉLV, 17 G.s, 4 ECO, 2 GÉ and 2 CÉ).

On 7 July, Cap21, whose administrative merger has not yet been registered for the primary, is excluded from the Ecologist Pole because of a disagreement on the charter of the primary about secularism and the refusal of its president, Corinne Lepage, to pledge to support the winner of the primary Nevertheless, the following 29 July, the court of Bobigny ordered the suspension of the exclusion of Cap21.

=== 2022 presidential election ===
The primary organized by the Ecologist Pole to appoint its candidate for the 2022 presidential election took place between 16 and 28 September 2021 through online voting on a secure platform. Members had the choice between 5 candidates:

- Delphine Batho, deputy for Deux-Sèvres and President of Ecology Generation;
- Jean-Marc Governatori, City Councilor of Nice and co-president of Cap Écologie;
- Yannick Jadot, EELV MEP;
- Éric Piolle, EELV Mayor of Grenoble;
- Sandrine Rousseau, former EELV spokesperson.

With a participation of more than 100,000 voters in the first round, Yannick Jadot comes first with 27.70% ahead of Sandrine Rousseau (25.14%), Delphine Batho (22.32%), Éric Piolle (22.29%) and Jean-Marc Governatori (2.35%). The latter contests the results and his movement seems since withdrawn from the ecologist pole Yannick Jadot won the second round by a narrow lead with 51.03% against 48.97% for Sandrine Rousseau.

Since the designation of Yannick Jadot as an environmental candidate in the presidential election, The New Democrats party (formed by LREM deputies from the PS and disappointed by the policy of Emmanuel Macron) has joined the Ecologist Pole

=== 2022 legislative elections ===
On 1 May 2022, in view of the 2022 French legislative election, the Ecologist Pole, made up of Générations.s, EELV, Génération Écologie, and LND, joined the Nouvelle Union Populaire écologique et sociale launched by La France insoumise. Other formations having supported the Ecologist Pole and opposed to this agreement, including Movement of Progressives, Independent Ecological Alliance, and Cap 21, gathered at the end of May 2022 and announced their intention to present 250 candidates and support others, in the constituencies where the NUPES candidate is not identified as an environmentalist.

== See also ==
- 2021 French Green Party presidential primary
