= Renew Europe =

Liberal political group of the European Parliament

- European Parliament group
- Name: Renew Europe
- English abbr.: Renew
- Formal name: Renew Europe group
- Ideology: Liberalism; Pro-Europeanism
- Political position: Centre to centre-right
- European parties: ALDE Party (majority); European Democratic Party (majority); European People's Party (minority)
- Associated organisations: Liberal International
- From: 20 June 2019
- Preceded by: ALDE Group
- Chaired by: Valérie Hayer
- MEP(s): 78 / 720 (11%)
- Website: reneweuropegroup.eu

Renew Europe (or simply Renew) is a liberal, centre to centre-right, pro-European political group of the European Parliament founded for the ninth European Parliament term. The group is the successor to the Alliance of Liberals and Democrats for Europe (ALDE) group which existed during the sixth, seventh and eighth terms from 2004 to 2019, and under a variety of other names in earlier Parliaments.

The group announced the adoption of its new name on 12 June 2019, after forming an alliance with the French party La République En Marche!, which wanted to avoid the word liberal in the name. The group continues to be known as the Liberal Group outside France.

== History ==
In May 2019, speaking at a debate leading up to the 2019 European Parliament election, Guy Verhofstadt, president of the Alliance of Liberals and Democrats for Europe (ALDE) group, announced that, following the election, the ALDE Group intended to dissolve and form a new alliance with French President Emmanuel Macron's "Renaissance" electoral list. During and following the European elections, the group temporarily styled itself "ALDE plus Renaissance plus USR PLUS".

On 19 June 2019, it was announced that Dacian Cioloș, former Prime Minister of Romania and European Commissioner for Agriculture and Rural Development, had been chosen as the group's inaugural chairman, defeating Sophie in 't Veld by 64 votes to 42 and thus becoming the first Romanian to become the leader of a European Parliamentary group. In October 2021, Cioloș resigned to return to domestic politics in Romania.

Following the resignation of Cioloș, Stéphane Séjourné announced his candidacy for the leadership of the Renew Europe group in the European Parliament and, as he ran unopposed, he was elected by acclamation on 19 October 2021. On 11 January 2024, Séjourné was appointed minister of Europe and foreign affairs in Gabriel Attal's government and therefore resigned from his position as chair of the Renew group.

On 25 January 2024, Valérie Hayer from French Renaissance party was elected by acclamation as leader of Renew Europe parliament group, as she ran unopposed.

In March 2024, 'New Europeans' was founded as an association under French law, bringing together Macron's Renaissance party and other French, Romanian, Slovenian, Polish and Danish parties that are inside Renew Europe, but that are not affiliated with a European party (ALDE or EDP), for a total of 22 MEPs.

Renew Europe presented three lead candidates for the 2024 European Parliament election, one for each of the three factions that form the joint group: ALDE (Marie-Agnes Strack-Zimmermann), EDP (Sandro Gozi) and L'Europe Ensemble (Valérie Hayer).

Renew Europe also has a political group for councillors, also previously called "ALDE", in the European Committee of the Regions.

== MEPs ==
=== 10th European Parliament ===
State	National party	European alliance	MEPs
Austria	NEOS – The New Austria and Liberal Forum; NEOS – Das Neue Österreich und Liberales Forum (NEOS)	ALDE	2 / 20
Belgium	Reformist Movement; Mouvement Réformateur (MR)	ALDE	3 / 22
Belgium	Different; Anders	ALDE	1 / 22
Belgium	The Committed Ones; Les Engagés (LE)	EDP	1 / 22
Bulgaria	Alliance for Rights and Freedoms; Aliança za prava i svobodi (APS)	None	1 / 17
Bulgaria	We Continue the Change; Prodalzhavame promyanata (PP)	ALDE	2 / 17
Denmark	Venstre, Denmark's Liberal Party; Venstre, Danmarks Liberale Parti (V)	ALDE	2 / 15
Denmark	Danish Social Liberal Party; Radikale Venstre (B)	ALDE	1 / 15
Denmark	Moderates; Moderaterne (M)	ALDE	1 / 15
Estonia	Estonian Reform Party; Eesti Reformierakond (RE)	ALDE	1 / 7
Estonia	Estonian Centre Party; Eesti Keskerakond (K)	None	1 / 7
Finland	Centre Party; Suomen Keskusta (Kesk); Centern i Finland (Centern)	ALDE	2 / 15
Finland	Swedish People's Party; Svenska folkpartiet i Finland (SFP); Suomen ruotsalainen kansanpuolue (RKP)	ALDE	1 / 15
France	Renaissance; Renaissance (RE)	None	5 / 81
France	Democratic Movement; Mouvement démocrate (MoDem)	EDP	4 / 81
France	Horizons; Horizons	None	2 / 81
France	Union of Democrats and Independents; Union des démocrates et indépendants (UDI)	ALDE	1 / 81
France	Independent; Bernard Guetta	Independent	1 / 81
Germany	Free Democratic Party; Freie Demokratische Partei (FDP)	ALDE	5 / 96
Germany	Free Voters; Freie Wähler (FW)	EDP	3 / 96
Germany	Party of Progress; Partei des Fortschritts (PdF)	EDP	1 / 96
Ireland	Fianna Fáil (FF)	ALDE	4 / 14
Ireland	Independent Ireland (II); Éire Neamhspleách (ÉN)	EDP	1 / 14
Ireland	Independent; Michael McNamara	Independent	1 / 14
Italy	Action; Azione (Az)	ALDE	1 / 76
Italy	Public Space; Spazio Pubblico (SP)	EDP	1 / 76
Latvia	For Latvia's Development; Latvijas attīstībai (LA)	ALDE	1 / 9
Lithuania	Liberals' Movement; Lietuvos Respublikos Liberalų sąjūdis (LRLS)	ALDE	1 / 11
Lithuania	Freedom Party; Laisvės partija (LP)	ALDE	1 / 11
Luxembourg	Democratic Party; Demokratesch Partei (DP); Parti Démocratique (PD); Demokratische Partei (DP)	ALDE	1 / 6
Netherlands	People's Party for Freedom and Democracy; Volkspartij voor Vrijheid en Democratie (VVD)	ALDE	4 / 31
Netherlands	Democrats 66; Democraten 66 (D66)	ALDE	3 / 31
Poland	Centre Union; Unia Centrum (C)	ALDE	1 / 53
Portugal	Liberal Initiative; Iniciativa Liberal (IL)	ALDE	2 / 21
Romania	Save Romania Union; Uniunea Salvați România (USR)	ALDE	2 / 33
Romania	People's Movement Party; Partidul Mișcarea Populară (PMP)	EPP	1 / 33
Slovakia	Progressive Slovakia; Progresívne Slovensko (PS)	ALDE	6 / 15
Slovenia	Freedom Movement; Gibanje Svoboda (GS)	ALDE	2 / 9
Spain	Basque Nationalist Party; Euzko Alderdi Jeltzalea (EAJ); Partido Nacionalista Vasco (PNV); Parti national basque (PNB)	EDP	1 / 61
Sweden	Centre Party; Centerpartiet (C)	ALDE	2 / 21
Sweden	Liberals; Liberalerna (L)	ALDE	1 / 21
European Union	Total		78 / 720

=== 9th European Parliament ===
Renew Europe has MEPs in 24 member states. Yellow indicates member states sending multiple MEPs, light yellow indicates member states sending a single MEP.

State	National party	European alliance	MEPs
Austria	NEOS – The New Austria and Liberal Forum; NEOS – Das Neue Österreich und Liberales Forum (NEOS)	ALDE	1 / 19
Belgium	Open Flemish Liberals and Democrats; Open Vlaamse Liberalen en Democraten (Open VLD)	ALDE	2 / 21
Belgium	Reformist Movement; Mouvement Réformateur (MR)	ALDE	2 / 21
Bulgaria	Movement for Rights and Freedoms; Dviženie za prava i svobodi (DPS); Dvizhenie za prava i svobodi (DPS)	ALDE	3 / 17
Croatia	Istrian Democratic Assembly; Istarski demokratski sabor (IDS)	ALDE	1 / 12
Czech Republic	ANO 2011; ANO 2011 (ANO)	ALDE	5 / 21
Denmark	Venstre, Denmark's Liberal Party; Venstre, Danmarks Liberale Parti (V)	ALDE	3 / 14
Denmark	Danish Social Liberal Party; Radikale Venstre (B)	ALDE	1 / 14
Denmark	Moderates; Moderaterne (M)	None	1 / 14
Denmark	Independent; Karen Melchior	Independent	1 / 14
Estonia	Estonian Reform Party; Eesti Reformierakond (RE)	ALDE	2 / 7
Estonia	Estonian Centre Party; Eesti Keskerakond (K)	ALDE	1 / 7
Finland	Centre Party; Suomen Keskusta (Kesk); Centern i Finland (Centern)	ALDE	2 / 14
Finland	Swedish People's Party; Svenska folkpartiet i Finland (SFP); Suomen ruotsalainen kansanpuolue (RKP)	ALDE	1 / 14
France	Renaissance; Renaissance (RE)	None	13 / 79
France	Democratic Movement; Mouvement démocrate (MoDem)	EDP	6 / 79
France	Republican, Radical and Radical-Socialist Party; Parti républicain, radical et radical-socialiste (PR)	ALDE	1 / 79
France	Horizons; Horizons	None	1 / 79
France	Cap Ecology; Cap écologie (CE)	None	1 / 79
France	Independent; Jérémy Decerle	Independent	1 / 79
Germany	Free Democratic Party; Freie Demokratische Partei (FDP)	ALDE	5 / 96
Germany	Free Voters; Freie Wähler (FW)	EDP	2 / 96
Greece	Independent; Giorgos Kyrtsos	Independent	1 / 21
Hungary	Momentum Movement; Momentum Mozgalom (Momentum)	ALDE	2 / 21
Ireland	Fianna Fáil – The Republican Party; Fianna Fáil – An Páirtí Poblachtánach (FF)	ALDE	2 / 13
Italy	Action; Azione	ALDE	2 / 76
Italy	Italia Viva; Italia Viva	EDP	1 / 76
Italy	Independent; Marco Zullo	Independent	1 / 76
Latvia	Development/For! Attīstībai/Par! (AP!)	ALDE	1 / 8
Lithuania	Liberals' Movement; Lietuvos Respublikos Liberalų sąjūdis (LRLS)	ALDE	1 / 11
Luxembourg	Democratic Party; Demokratesch Partei (DP); Parti Démocratique (PD); Demokratische Partei (DP)	ALDE	1 / 6
Luxembourg	Independent; Monica Semedo	Independent	1 / 6
Netherlands	People's Party for Freedom and Democracy; Volkspartij voor Vrijheid en Democratie (VVD)	ALDE	5 / 29
Netherlands	Democrats 66; Democraten 66 (D66)	ALDE	1 / 29
Netherlands	Volt Netherlands; Volt Nederland (Volt)	Volt Europa	1 / 29
Poland	Szymon Hołownia's Poland 2050; Polska 2050 Szymona Hołowni (PL2050)	None	1 / 51
Romania	Renewing Romania's European Project; Reînnoim Proiectul European al României (REPER)	None	5 / 33
Romania	Save Romania Union; Uniunea Salvați România (USR)	ALDE	2 / 33
Slovakia	Progressive Slovakia; Progresívne Slovensko (PS)	ALDE	3 / 14
Slovakia	Apple; Jablko	None	1 / 14
Slovenia	Freedom Movement; Gibanje Svoboda (GS)	None	1 / 8
Slovenia	Greens of Slovenia; Zeleni Slovenije (ZS)	None	1 / 8
Spain	Citizens; Ciudadanos (Cs)	ALDE	7 / 59
Spain	Basque Nationalist Party; Euzko Alderdi Jeltzalea (EAJ); Partido Nacionalista Vasco (PNV); Parti national basque (PNB)	EDP	1 / 59
Spain	Independent; Javier Nart	Independent	1 / 59
Sweden	Centre Party; Centerpartiet (C)	ALDE	2 / 20
Sweden	Liberals; Liberalerna (L)	ALDE	1 / 20
European Union	Total		102 / 705

==== Former members ====
- The UK MEPs of the Liberal Democrats and the Alliance Party de facto left the group on 31 January 2020 when the UK left the EU.
- On 20 January 2021, the Renew Europe Group terminated the membership of Viktor Uspaskich, MEP of the Lithuanian Labour Party.
- In March 2021, Czech MEP Radka Maxová left the Renew Europe group because of disagreement with ANO 2011.

==== Resignation and replacement ====
- Fredrick Federley, MEP of the Swedish Centre Party, resigned on 11 December 2020 from all politics immediately.
- In August 2022, Søren Gade, MEP from Venstre, announced that he would stand in the upcoming general election. It was later announced that Bergur Løkke Rasmussen would replace him in the European Parliament. On 13 March 2023, he announced that he would switch his party affiliation to the Moderates.

==== New members ====
- In February 2020, Nicola Danti leaves the S&D group and joins Renew Europe.
- In March 2021, Marco Zullo, elected among the Five Star Movement (independent) leaves his party and joins Renew Europe.
- In May 2021, Lucia Nicholsonová, from Slovakia, then Independent at the national level but having been part of the European Conservatives and Reformists, leaves this group and joins Renew Europe.
- On 10 November 2021, Renew Europe's president Stéphane Séjourné announces that the Polish political party Poland 2050 has joined Renew Europe, leading to Róża Thun joining the group.
- On 17 November 2021, Carlo Calenda joins Renew Europe following the accession of his party, Azione. Renew Europe reaches 100 MEPs.
- On 7 December 2021, Michal Wiezik leaves the EPP and joins Renew Europe following his transfer to Progressive Slovakia.
- On 8 March 2022, Salima Yenbou, a French MEP from Europe Ecology – The Greens, leaves The Greens and joins Renew Europe after endorsing Emmanuel Macron in the run-up to the French presidential election.
- On 4 May 2022, Greek MEP Giorgos Kyrtsos leaves the EPP and joins Renew Europe.

== Leadership ==
- President: Valérie Hayer (France)
- First Vice-president: Billy Kelleher (Ireland)
- Vice-presidents: Gerben-Jan Gerbrandy (Netherlands), João Cotrim de Figueiredo (Portugal), Irena Joveva (Slovenia), Ivars Ijabs (Latvia), Morten Løkkegaard (Denmark), Dan Barna (Romania), Anna-Maja Henriksson (Finland)
- Secretary General: Philip Drauz (Germany)

== International cooperation ==
On 21 January 2022, representatives of Renew Europe held a meeting with the European Party of Armenia.
