= Ségolène Royal =

French politician (born 1953)

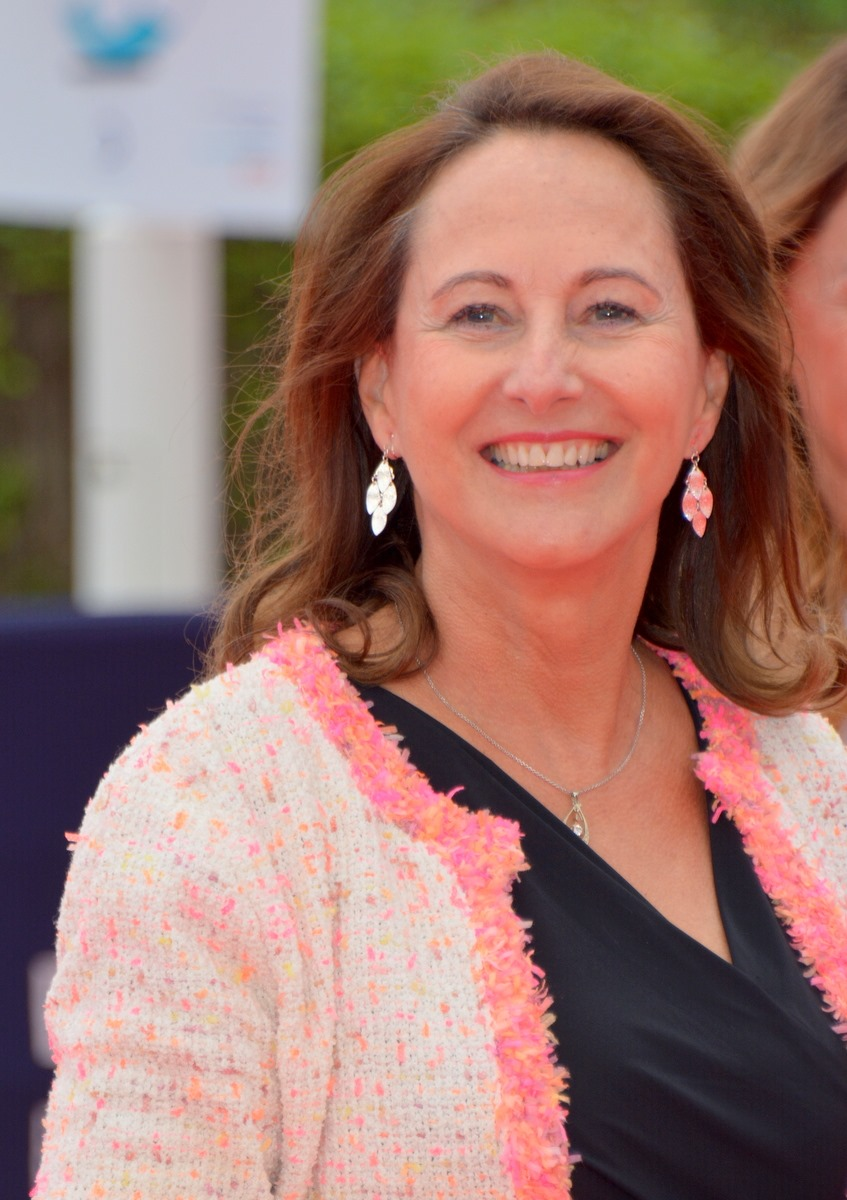
- Royal in 2020

Minister of Ecology, Sustainable Development and Energy
- In office 2 April 2014 – 10 May 2017
- Prime Minister: Manuel Valls; Bernard Cazeneuve
- Preceded by: Philippe Martin
- Succeeded by: Nicolas Hulot (Minister of Ecological and Solidary Transition)

President of the Regional Council of Poitou-Charentes
- In office 30 March 2004 – 21 April 2014
- Preceded by: Élisabeth Morin
- Succeeded by: Jean-François Macaire

Minister delegate for Families, Children and People with Disabilities
- In office 20 March 2000 – 6 May 2002
- Prime Minister: Lionel Jospin
- Preceded by: Martine Aubry
- Succeeded by: Jean-François Mattei

Minister delegate for School Teaching
- In office 4 June 1997 – 27 March 2000
- Prime Minister: Lionel Jospin
- Preceded by: Françoise Hostalier (Secretary of State for School Teaching)
- Succeeded by: Xavier Darcos (Minister of Labour, Social Relations, Families, Solidarity and the Cities)

Minister of the Environment
- In office 2 April 1992 – 29 March 1993
- Prime Minister: Pierre Bérégovoy
- Preceded by: Brice Lalonde
- Succeeded by: Michel Barnier

Member of the National Assembly for Deux-Sèvres's 2nd constituency
- In office 19 June 2002 – 19 June 2007
- Preceded by: Jean-Pierre Marché
- Succeeded by: Delphine Batho
- In office 2 April 1993 – 4 July 1997
- Preceded by: Jean-Pierre Marché
- Succeeded by: Jean-Pierre Marché
- In office 23 June 1988 – 2 May 1992
- Preceded by: Constituency re-established
- Succeeded by: Jean-Pierre Marché

Departmental Councillor of Deux-Sèvres
- In office 2 April 1992 – 27 March 1998
- Constituency: Canton of La Mothe-Saint-Héray

Ambassador of France for the Arctic and Antarctica
- In office 1 September 2017 – 24 January 2020
- President: Emmanuel Macron
- Preceded by: Michel Rocard
- Succeeded by: Olivier Poivre d'Arvor

Personal details
- Born: Marie-Ségolène Royal; 22 September 1953 (age 73) Dakar, French West Africa (present-day Senegal)
- Party: Socialist
- Domestic partner(s): François Hollande (1978–2007)
- Children: 4
- Relatives: Gérard Royal (brother)
- Education: Nancy 2 University; Sciences Po; ÉNA
- Website: Official Facebook

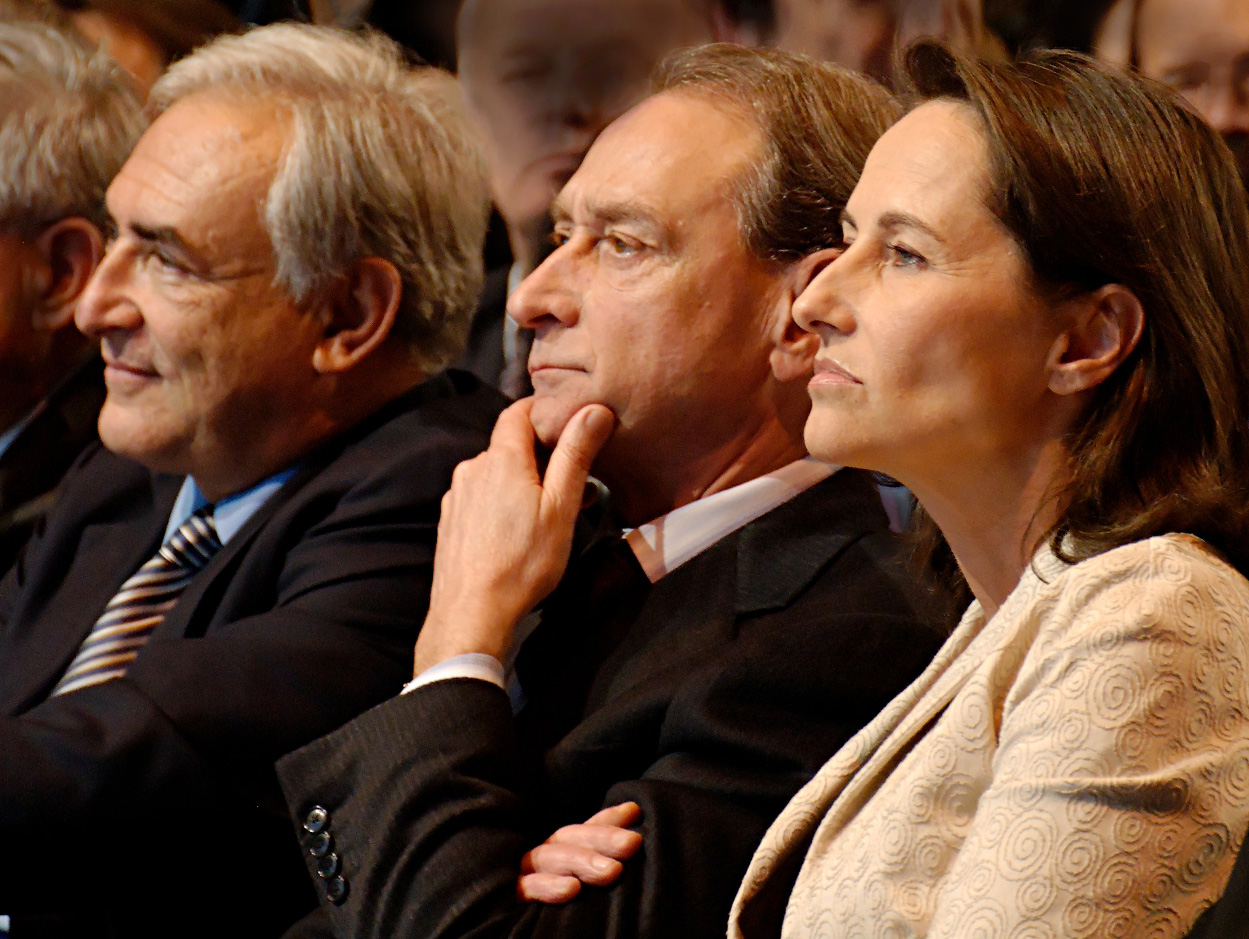
Ségolène Royal (right) at a 6 February 2007 meeting with Dominique Strauss-Kahn (left) and Bertrand Delanoë (center)

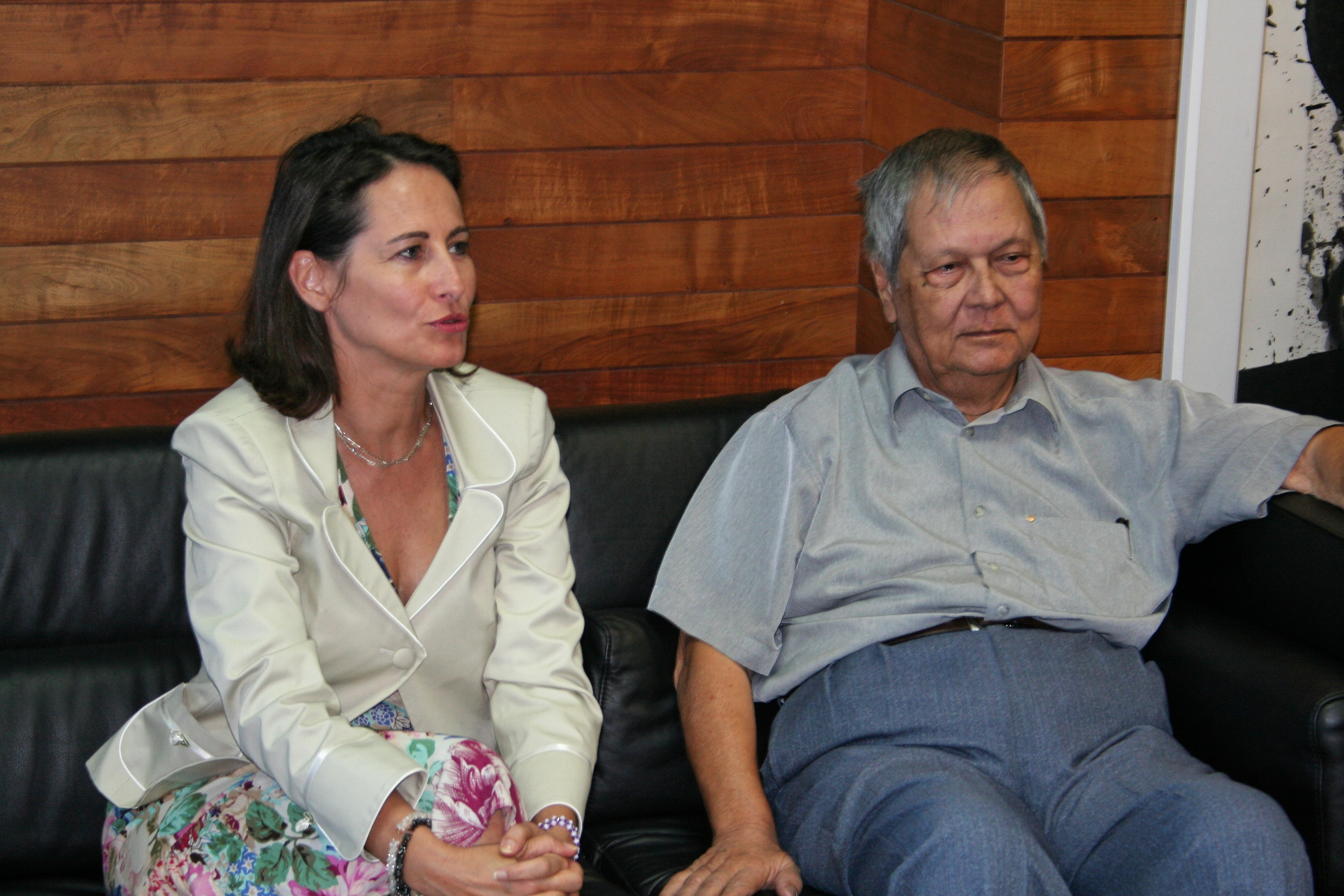
Royal with Reunionese politician Paul Vergès in 2006

Ségolène Royal (born Marie-Ségolène Royal, French pronunciation: [maʁi seɡɔlɛn ʁwajal]; 22 September 1953) is a French politician and member of the Socialist Party.

Royal represented Deux-Sèvres's 2nd constituency in the National Assembly from 1988 to 2007 and was president of the Poitou-Charentes Regional Council from 2004 to 2014. She won the 2006 Socialist Party primary ahead of the 2007 French presidential election, becoming the first woman to be nominated as a presidential candidate by a major party in France. In the subsequent presidential election, she earned further distinction as the first woman to qualify for the second round of a French presidential election, but ultimately lost to Nicolas Sarkozy.

In 2008, Royal narrowly lost to Martine Aubry in the Socialist Party's election for First Secretary at the Party's twenty-second national congress. She lost the Socialist Party presidential primary in 2011, and unsuccessfully ran for a seat in the National Assembly in the 2012 legislative elections.

She has four children with François Hollande, her former domestic partner and Sarkozy's successor as president, and was appointed by him to the vice-chair directorship of the Banque Publique d'Investissement (BPI) in 2013. She served as Minister for Ecology from 2014 to 2017 in the Valls and Cazeneuve cabinets.

== Early life ==
Marie-Ségolène Royal was born on 22 September 1953 in the military base of Ouakam, Dakar, French West Africa (now Senegal), the daughter of Hélène Dehaye and Jacques Royal, a former artillery officer and aide to the mayor of Chamagne (Vosges). Her parents had eight children in nine years: Marie-Odette, Marie-Nicole, Gérard, Marie-Ségolène, Antoine, Paul, Henri and Sigisbert.

After secondary school in the small town of Melle, Deux-Sèvres, Royal attended a local university where she graduated second in her class with a degree in economics. Her eldest sister then suggested she prepare the entrance exam to the elite Institut d'études politiques de Paris popularly called Sciences Po, which she attended on scholarship. There she discovered politics of class and feminism ("Sciences Po" at the time was 85% upper-class Parisian, mostly male).

In 1972, at the age of 19, Royal sued her father because he refused to divorce her mother and pay alimony and child support to finance the children's education. She won the case after many years in court, shortly before he died of lung cancer in 1981. Royal and five of her siblings had refused to see him again.

Royal, like the majority of France's political elite, is a graduate of the École nationale d'administration. She was in the same class as her former partner of 30 years, François Hollande, as well as Dominique de Villepin (prime minister under Jacques Chirac). Each class year at the ENA receives a nickname to distinguish it: Royal tried to get her peers to name their class after Louise Michel, a revolutionary from the 1870s, but they chose the name "Voltaire" instead. During her time at the ENA, Royal also dropped "Marie" from her hyphenated first name.

== Political career ==
=== Beginnings ===
After graduating in 1980, she elected to serve as a judge (conseiller) of an administrative court before she was noticed by President François Mitterrand's special adviser Jacques Attali and recruited to his staff in 1982. She held the junior rank of chargée de mission from 1982 to 1988.

=== Member of the French National Assembly ===
She decided to become a candidate for the 1988 legislative election; she registered in the rural, Western Deux-Sèvres Département. Her candidacy was an example of the French political tradition of parachutage (parachuting), appointing promising "Parisian" political staffers as candidates in provincial districts to test their mettle. She was up against an entrenched UDF incumbent, and Mitterrand is said to have told her: "You will not win, but you will next time." Straddling strongly Catholic and Protestant areas, that district had been held by conservatives since World War II. She did win against the odds, and remarked: "Pour un parachutage, l'atterrissage est réussi." ("As far as parachuting goes, the landing was a success").

After this election, she served as representative in the National Assembly for the Deux-Sèvres' 2nd constituency (1988–1992, 1993–1997, 2002–2007).

=== Ministerial offices ===
- Minister of Environment: 1992–1993.
- Minister of School Education: 1997–2000.
- Minister of Family and Children: 2000–2001.
- Minister of Family, Children and Disabled persons: 2001–2002.

=== President of the Region Poitou-Charentes ===
On 28 March 2004, she obtained 55% in the second round in the regional election in Poitou-Charentes, notably defeating Prime Minister Jean-Pierre Raffarin's protégée, Élisabeth Morin, in his home region. She was elected president of the region the next week. She kept her National Assembly seat until June 2007, when she chose not to run in the legislative election, in agreement with one of her presidential campaign's promises. She organised a run-off between two contenders; the winner, Delphine Batho, went on to win the district for her and Royal's party.

=== 2007 presidential candidacy ===
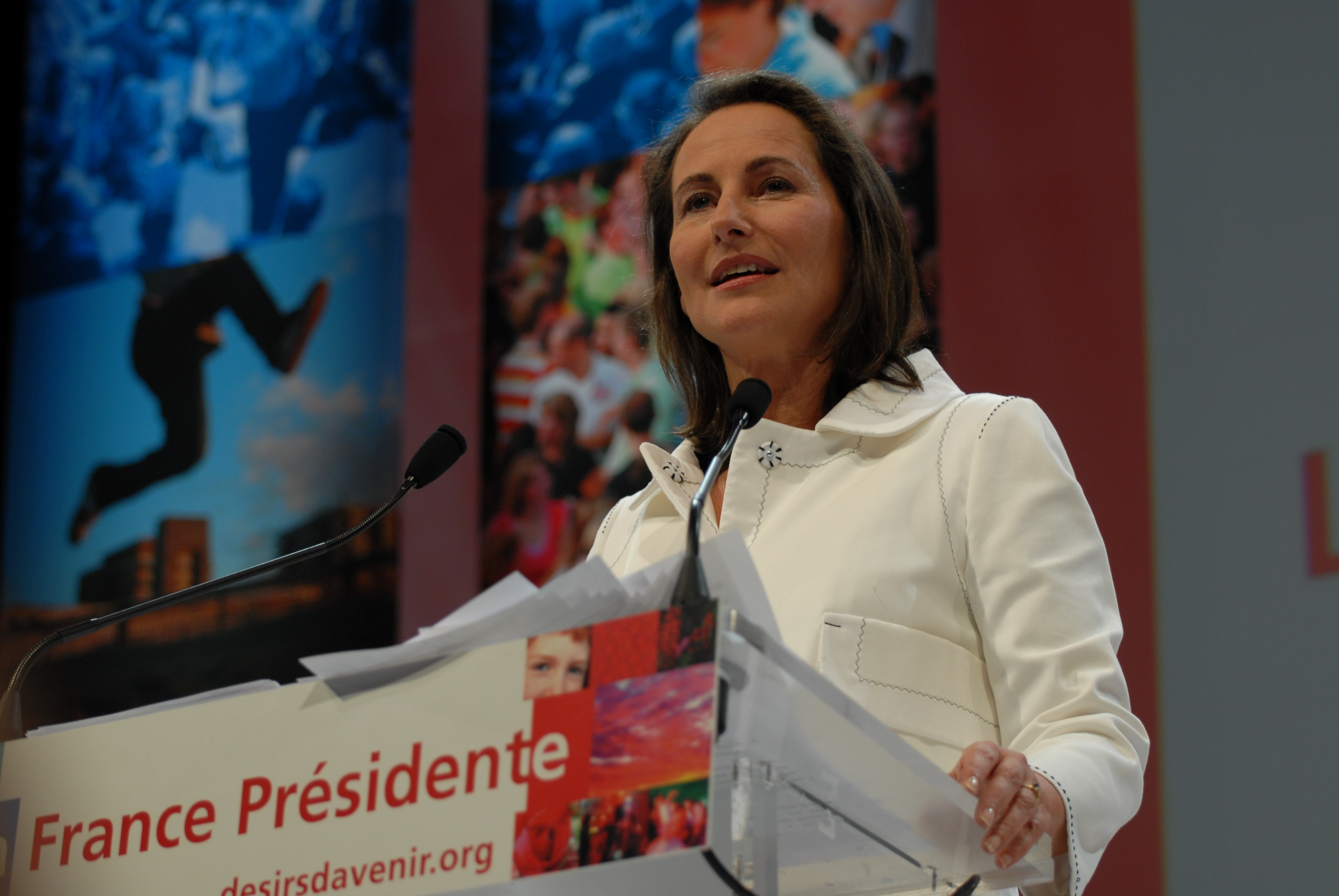
Royal during her 2007 presidential campaign

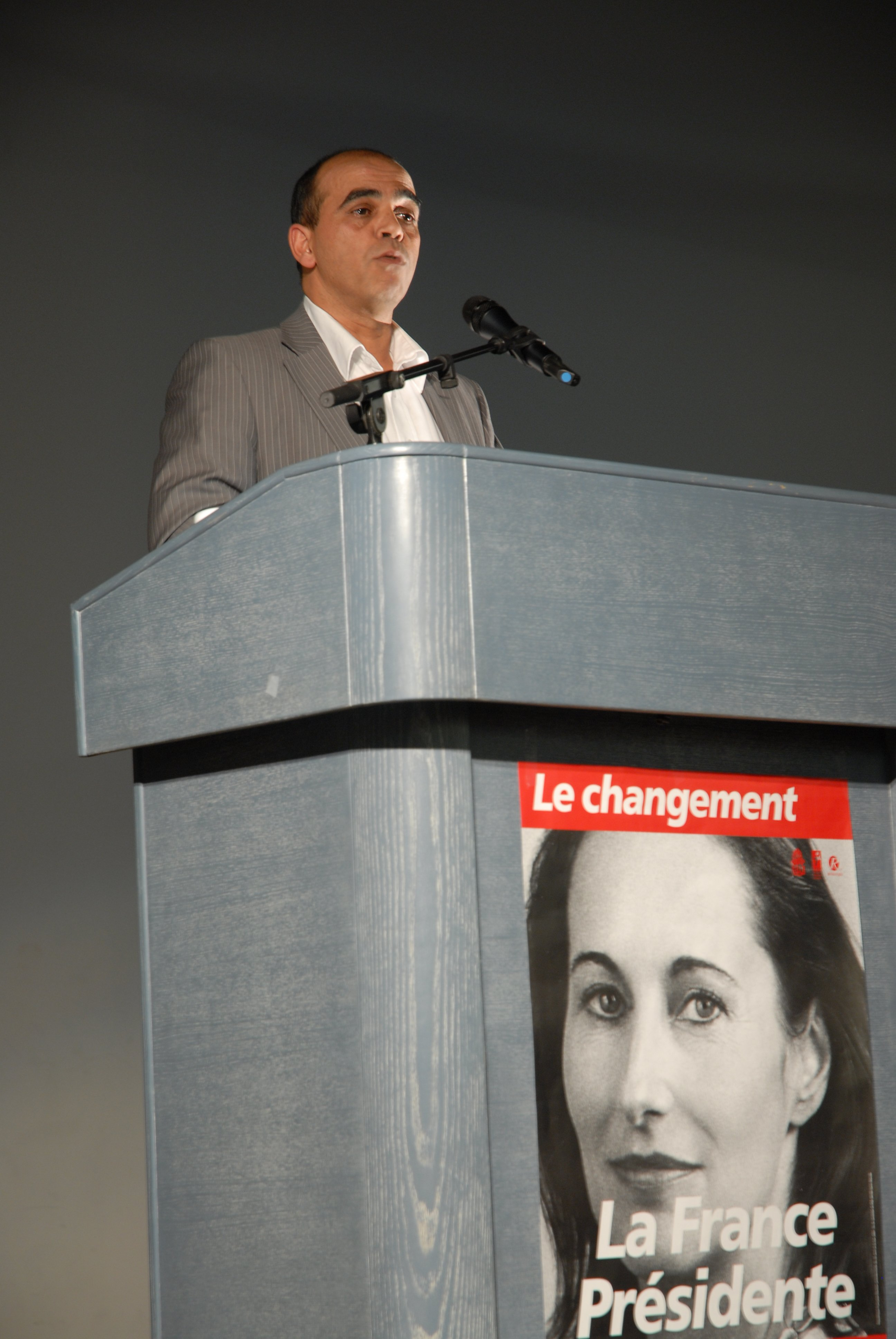
Kader Arif, the European parliament's rapporteur for ACTA in Toulouse on 13 April 2007 where he was promoting Ségolène Royal's candidacy for the 2007 presidential election

On 22 September 2005, Paris Match published an interview in which she declared that she was considering running for the presidency in 2007. In 2006 the CPE (first employment contract) laws were proposed with large protests as a result. Rather than going to the organised protest, she voted a law in her "région" whereby no company using that type of contract would receive the Région's subsidies. The government backed down and stated that the law would be put on the statute book, but that it would not be applied. After this event Royal was tipped as the lead contender in what is dubbed the "Sarko-Ségo" race against Nicolas Sarkozy.

By the beginning of September 2006, her intentions had become quite clear. She has said that only widespread sexism in the Socialist Party had prevented it from rallying around her candidacy as it would have had she been a man. She announced an official team to promote her campaign on 30 August. At this point, polls showed her to be much more popular than her closest competitor, former Prime Minister Lionel Jospin, and other Socialist heavyweights Dominique Strauss-Kahn, Jack Lang, another former Prime Minister Laurent Fabius and François Hollande.

Her status as a presidential candidate became more likely on 28 September 2006, when Lionel Jospin, the Socialist former Prime Minister and a fixture in French politics for nearly three decades, announced that he would not run after all. Jack Lang followed suit. On 16 November, Royal defeated Laurent Fabius and Dominique Strauss-Kahn in the French Socialist Party primary, becoming the party's candidate for the 2007 presidential election. The Socialist party's members voted 60.69% for her and gave a bit under 20% each to the more traditional contenders. She also won in 101 of 104 of the Socialist Party's fédérations, losing only Haute-Corse, Mayotte and Seine-Maritime (the latter being the home region of Laurent Fabius).

One of her top advisors, Éric Besson, resigned soon afterwards over a disagreement about the costs of this programme, which he believes could reach €35 billion, while others in the campaign team wanted to delay bringing out that figure.[The figure was equivalent to that of Mr. Sarkozy's but higher than Mr. Bayrou's, who was becoming a key figure in the race.] This led to an unusually bitter fall-out, and Mr Besson writing a book titled Qui connaît Madame Royal ? (Who knows Mrs Royal?), published on 20 March. In it, Besson accuses Royal of being a populist, an authoritarian and a luddite and says that he will not vote for her and hopes that she is not elected. He then went on to join the Sarkozy campaign and was rewarded with a junior position in the next government on 18 May 2007.

Following the first round of the presidential election, she faced Nicolas Sarkozy in the second round of voting on 6 May in a two-way runoff. In the final round of voting on Sunday, 6 May, Sarkozy won the presidency with 53% of the vote. Royal conceded defeat and wished Sarkozy the best, requesting he keep her supporters in mind.

Royal later revealed she had offered defeated centrist candidate, François Bayrou, the premiership should she be elected.

=== 2008 Socialist Party leadership election ===
Royal entered the leadership election of the Socialist Party to replace her former common law husband François Hollande as head of the party. She garnered the largest plurality of votes in the first round of voting, but not enough to win outright; she was eventually narrowly defeated in the second round by rival Martine Aubry by the margin of 42 votes. After a vote recount, Aubry was declared the winner 25 November 2008, with the margin widening to 102 votes. Royal has announced her intentions to contest the result. Royal has blamed party leaders and her former partner for her loss in the 2007 election.

=== 2011 Socialist Party presidential primary ===
Royal ran in the French Socialist Party presidential primary election of 2011, the party's first ever open primary. She arrived 4th in the first round on 9 October 2011 with a mere 6.95% of votes, considerably below the figures suggested by opinion polls.

=== Defeat in the 2012 legislative election ===
In 2012, Royal ran for office representing Charente-Maritime's 1st constituency. She lost the election to a PRG candidate, Olivier Falorni.

After her separation with Hollande, political relations between them were tense, though they have both stated that they remained friends. In the 2008 Socialist Party leadership election, Hollande backed another candidate, and Royal has blamed him and the party establishment for her 2007 Presidential defeat.

=== 2014 return to government ===
On 2 April 2014, Royal was appointed Minister of Ecology, Sustainable Development and Energy in the second cabinet of Prime Minister Manuel Valls. In January 2015 she was third in line in governmental rank, after the Prime Minister and Foreign Minister.

Increasingly, commentators have seen Royal as President François Hollande’s stand-in for some important state occasions. When Pope Francis touched down on French soil for the first time in his papacy with a visit to the European Parliament in Strasbourg in November 2014, Royal was the senior French official there to greet him. After the deadly attacks against a satirical newspaper and a kosher supermarket in January 2015, she travelled to Israel to represent France at the memorial services. In 2016 Royal promised to install 1,000 km of 'solar roadways' in the next five years. One kilometre was installed in Normandie, and after producing about a quarter of the power predicted, was mostly torn up inside three years.

=== 2017–2020: Ambassador for the Arctic and Antarctic ===
When Emmanuel Macron was elected French President in May 2017, Royal hoped to be offered a position in his government but instead was offered the position of Ambassador for the Poles, which she accepted in June 2017. In late 2018 the publication of Royal's book "Ce que je peux enfin vous dire" (What I can finally tell you) detailing the sexism she had suffered throughout her political career, coincided with a decline in Macron's popularity at the time of the Gilets jaunes protests and resulted in speculation that Royal was contemplating a political comeback. After repeatedly and publicly criticising Macron's handling of pension reform, it was announced by the Council of Ministers that the Mission to the Poles would be ended, effectively removing Royal from her position, in tandem with an official investigation being launched inquiring about alleged misuse of public funds during Royal's time in office.

=== 2026 Socialist Party presidential primary ===
She announced her candidacy in the Socialist presidential primary for the 2027 French presidential election on 10 July 2026.

== Policies ==
Royal has tended to campaign on family and other socially-oriented issues, rather than on economic or foreign policy issues. For instance, she has mounted campaigns against the exposure of children to violent television shows, including cartoons (see her 1989 book, listed below, Le Ras-le-bol des bébés zappeurs, roughly translated as "The Channel-Surfing Kids Are Fed Up"), and more generally has taken a stand on several issues regarding family values and the protection of children.

Royal stated as part of her 100-point platform that if elected, she would raise the lowest state pensions by five per cent, increase the monthly minimum wage to €1,500, raise benefits of handicapped citizens, implement state-paid rental deposits for the poorest citizens, and guarantee a job or job training to every student within six months of graduation. She pledged to abolish a flexible work contract for small companies. She pledged free contraception for all young women and a €10,000 interest-free loan for all young people.

=== Economy ===
The capitalists and the socialists have to be frightened. There is no alternative. They can't just dispose of people as they wish. They have to be held accountable.

— Royal

Royal opposes movements of jobs between EU countries and outsourcing to developing countries. She pledged to abolish a flexible work contract for small companies. She did not directly address whether additional taxes would need to be raised to fund these programs, stating that they can be paid for by cutting waste in government. She was appointed to the vice-chair directorship of the Banque Publique d'Investissement, from which position she stated that the "BPI's purpose is not to do business nor to make profits".

=== Environment ===
The Socialist Party website states that during her tenure as Minister for the Environment, 1992–1993, Royal campaigned actively and successfully for the "Law on the treatment and recycling of Waste" (La loi sur le traitement et le recyclage des déchets), the "Law to preserve the countryside" (La loi sur la reconquête des paysages), a "Save our countrysides, savour their products" campaign to provide proper labelling for the products of 100 local areas (opération "Sauvons nos paysages, savourons leurs produits"), and the "Law against noise pollution" (La loi de lutte contre le bruit). She provided compensation for people adversely affected by airport noise.

=== Education ===
During her tenure as Minister-delegate for the Family, Children, and the Handicapped, 2000–2002, Royal was active in the re-launch of the Priority Education Zones program (ZEP / zone d'éducation prioritaire), the creation of a government student lunch program, the implementation of language instruction as a priority in primary schools, the creation of a national home-tutoring program, Heures de Soutien Scolaire, and the creation of programs for parental involvement in schools, "la Semaine des parents à l'école", and national campaigns for the elections of parent-representatives. She also campaigned for the creation of local education and citizenship education contracts, the "Initiatives citoyennes" program for teaching children how to live together, the law on "Defense of children's rights and campaign against violence in the schools" (Loi de juin 1998 relative à la prévention et à la répression des infractions sexuelles ainsi qu'à la protection des mineurs), the "Campaign against hazing rituals in higher education" (Loi de juin 1998 contre le bizutage), the "Campaign against violence and racketeering" which included implementation of the "SOS Violence" telephone number, and the implementation of mandatory civics instruction in secondary schools.

In January 2006, she criticised secondary school teachers (workers of state public service) who give private lessons outside school hours, saying that they should spend more time in school. When a bootleg video of the speech surfaced on the Internet in November 2006, the teachers' union SNES rebuffed her, requesting that she renounce her proposal.

=== Family and social affairs ===
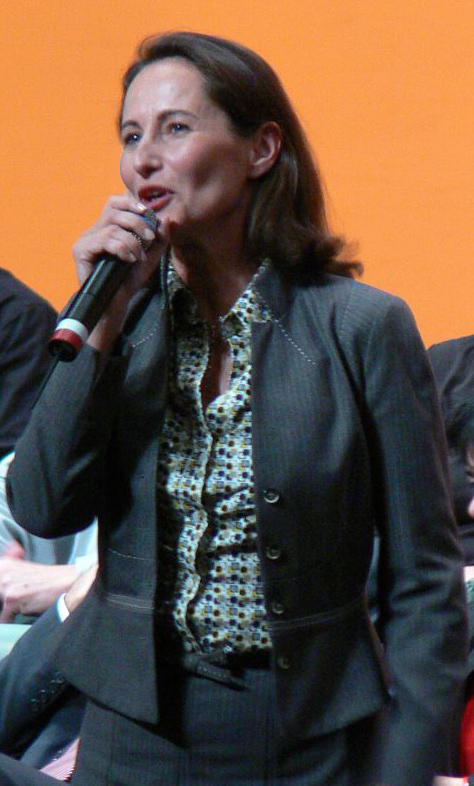
Ségolène Royal speaking to a crowd in Nantes

In 1989, Royal wrote The Channel-Surfing Kids Are Fed-Up, a book in which she criticised Japanese animation and superhero live-action series (then dominant in certain TV programs) as poor quality production detrimental for children.

Royal favours, and has worked for, the "Parental rights and obligations act" (Loi sur l'autorité parentale), the "Women's rights reform and anonymous childbirth act" (l'accouchement sous X), the creation of paternity leave, the creation of 40,000 new spaces in French nursery schools, and Social housing reform. She has been active in campaigns providing for "Parental time-off provisions and financial support for child illness care", Special education support (parents d'enfants handicapés), "Benefit allocations for students starting the new school year" (Allocation de rentrée scolaire), and the "Prostitution of Minors Act" (Loi contre la prostitution des mineurs) which provides penal measures for clients. Royal has supported the "Law against child pornography", the creation of the association "Childhood and the Media" (Enfance et média) against violence in the media, the creation of the Plan Handiscole for the education of handicapped children and adolescents and their integration into life at school, programs for mass and individual transportation, and the creation of the program "Tourism and the Handicapped" (Tourisme et handicap). In 2009, she declared herself to be "profoundly shocked" by statements of Pope Benedict XVI which claimed that the distribution of condoms will not stop the spread of AIDS. Royal added that "the responsibility of any religious leader" is to "defend the principle of life, and certainly not to urge human beings towards their deaths."

When she accepted her nomination as the Socialist presidential candidate, Royal said: "There is a strong correlation between the status of a woman and the state of justice or injustice in a country." According to an article in Ms. magazine, French women currently earn 80% of a male counterpart's salary.

Royal has been a long-standing critic of violence on television. She has voiced opinions in the past linking youth crime to exposure to pornography and television violence. She also described the M6 programme Loft Story, imitating the internationally popular Big Brother TV series, as contrary to principles of human dignity and risking transforming viewers into voyeurs instead of providing quality programming.

A law passed in February 2002, introduced by Royal on behalf of the Jospin government, allows some parental authority to be granted to same-sex partners. The law amended Article 377 of the Civil Code in allowing a parent to ask a judge to share his/her parental authority with a partner. Article 377–1, added by the law, ensures that "delegation may provide, for the needs of education of a child, that the father and mother, or one of them, shall share all or part of the exercise of parental authority with the third person delegatee".

In a June 2006 interview with LGBT publication Têtu, Royal said "opening up marriage to same-sex couples is needed in the name of equality, visibility and respect" and said that if her party formed the next government she would introduce a bill to legalise same-sex marriage and adoption.

According to her 2007 campaign website, Royal has advocated a policy of more humane prisons and supports creating better conditions inside penal institutions. The website states that she supports a system of rehabilitating offenders and reintegrating them into society.

== Foreign policy ==
Royal initially appeared to have few opinions on several notable foreign policy subjects, such as the accession of Turkey to the European Union, merely responding, "my opinion is that of the French people." On the subject of the Iranian nuclear program, Royal also took conflicting positions. She initially took a very hard line in a televised debate, contending that any nuclear power programme in Iran must be prevented since it would inevitably lead to weapons production. When she was criticised by French politicians for not understanding the Nuclear Non-Proliferation Treaty – which gives signatories the right to nuclear power for non-military purposes – Royal softened her position and, through a spokesman, said that a civil nuclear program should be allowed as long as UN inspectors were permitted to conduct spot checks.

=== International tours ===
==== Middle East ====
In early December 2006, controversy followed a brief tour of the Middle East. Meeting Hezbollah politician Ali Ammar, she took exception to his use of the euphemism "Zionist entity", but did not take issue with his comparison of the Palestinian territories to France under German occupation during World War II. This attracted criticism in France and in Israel which Royal visited next. However, the French ambassador to Lebanon, Bernard Emié, backed her explanation that she did not hear "the offending remarks" – the discussion took place via an interpreter supplied by the Lebanese parliament. In the same visit, Royal thanked the minister for being so "frank" when he described US foreign policy in the Middle East as "unlimited American insanity".

==== China ====
Royal visited China in January 2007; after speaking with a lawyer in that country she noted to the press that he had pointed out to her that the Chinese legal system was "faster" than the French one. She was immediately reminded by her opponents at home that the Chinese system orders 10,000 executions each year, and that defence lawyers there must be authorised by the Communist Party. She however brought up with her hosts the fate of three Chinese journalists recently imprisoned, and criticised the "meekness" of French entrepreneurs in tackling new markets such as China. Royal was criticised by French and international media by what was called "mangling the French language" in a soundbite delivered on the Great Wall of China. She used the word bravitude instead of the word bravoure, which means bravery.

==== Canada: Support for the Quebec independence movement ====
In January 2007, during a meeting with Quebec opposition leader and Parti Québécois head André Boisclair, she declared her support for the Quebec sovereignty movement in its aim to secede from Canada. Royal said Quebec and France share common values, including "sovereignty and Quebec's freedom". Soon after, Royal took a phone call from comedian Gérald Dahan pretending to be Quebec Premier Jean Charest, and was tricked into making a quip about Corsica's independence: "Not all French people would be opposed." She then added, "But don't repeat that or we'll have another scandal on our hands."

==== On Afghanistan ====
On 5 April 2007, when commenting on the kidnapping of two Frenchmen by the Taliban in Afghanistan, Royal called for sanctions to be imposed by the United Nations against regimes like the Taliban. This comment was widely interpreted as indicating that Royal did not understand that the Taliban no longer formed the Afghan government and that she was clueless on international matters.

==== Ukraine: Russian support ====
During the 2022 Russian invasion of Ukraine, Royal repeatedly supported the Russian view that NATO was to blame for the war, and falsely claimed that the Mariupol hospital airstrike and the Bucha massacre never happened. According to her, the events were "war propaganda" promoted by Ukrainian president Volodymyr Zelenskyy to interrupt the peace process. Royal's claims were condemned by Olivier Faure, the leader of Royal's Socialist Party, and Raphaël Glucksmann, its leader in the European Parliament.

==== Hijacking 'Africa-led' clean energy scheme ====
On 30 April 2017, Youba Sokona resigned from the Africa Renewable Energy Initiative, citing “European interference [to impose EU-preferred projects] in African governance that belongs to another era.” Reports surfaced directly accusing Ségolène Royal of undermining African leadership. The initiative was scrapped in 2017.

=== Africa ===
In July 2025, Royal pointed out the growing disenchantment of African nations with France, accused of broken promises.

== Personal life ==
From the late 1970s, Royal was the partner of François Hollande, later to become President of France, whom she met at ENA. The couple had four children. They were neither married (considering it too "bourgeois") nor bound by a PACS (pacte civil de solidarité, which provides for a civil union between two adults, regardless of gender), contrary to rumours. A news agency leaked news of their separation in June 2007, on the eve of the legislative election. According to the Guardian, she had asked Hollande "to move out of the house" and pursue his new love interest "which has been detailed in books and newspapers" – a reference to a much-discussed chapter by journalists explaining how Hollande was having a long-term affair with a journalist.

Royal's eldest son, Thomas Hollande, served as an adviser to her during her presidential candidacy, working on a website designed to appeal to young voters. Her brother Antoine named their brother Gérard Royal as the agent who placed the bomb that sank the Greenpeace ship Rainbow Warrior. Others argued that this statement is exaggerated and that Gérard was part of the logistics team. Royal's cousin Anne-Christine Royal followed the paternal side of the family and has been a candidate of the far-right Front National party at a local election in Bordeaux. Royal was listed as one of the fifty best-dressed over 50 by The Guardian in March 2013.

== Bibliography ==
Royal is the author unless otherwise noted.

- Le Printemps des grands-parents: la nouvelle alliance des âges (Paris : Cogite-R. Laffont, 1987) ISBN 2-221-05314-1, (Paris: France Loisirs, 1988) ISBN 2-7242-3948-2, (Paris: Presses pocket, 1989) ISBN 2-266-02730-1.
- Le Ras-le-bol des bébés zappeurs (Paris: R. Laffont, 1989) ISBN 2-221-05826-7, cover "Télé-massacre, l'overdose?", subjects): Télévision et enfants, Violence—A la télévision.
- Pays, paysans, paysages (Paris: R. Laffont, 1993) ISBN 2-221-07046-1, subject(s): Environnement—Protection—France; Politique de l'environnement—France; Développement rural—France.
- France. Ministère de l'environnement (1991–1997) Ségolène Royal, une année d'actions pour la planète: avril 1992 – mars 1993 (Paris : Ministère de l'environnement, ca 1993), subject(s): Politique de l'environnement—France.
- France. Assemblée nationale (1958–) Commission des affaires étrangères Rapport d'information sur les suites de la Conférence de Rio / présenté par M. Roland Nungesser et Mme Ségolène Royal (Paris : Assemblée nationale, 1994) ISBN 2-11-087788-X, subject(s): Développement durable; Conférence des Nations unies sur l'environnement et le développement.
- La vérité d'une femme (Paris: Stock, 1996) ISBN 2-234-04648-3, subject(s): Pratiques politiques—France—1970–.
- Laguerre, Christian École, informatique et nouveaux comportements préf. de Ségolène Royal (Paris; Montréal (Québec): Éd. l'Harmattan, 1999) ISBN 2-7384-7453-5, subject(s): Informatique—Aspect social; Éducation et informatique; Ordinateurs et enfants.
- Sassier, Monique Construire la médiation familiale : arguments et propositions preface by Ségolène Royal (Paris: Dunod, 2001) ISBN 2-10-005993-9.
- Amar, Cécile and Hassoux, Didier Ségolène et François ([Paris] : Privé, impr. 2005) ISBN 2-35076-002-2, subject(s): Royal, Ségolène (1953–) – Biographies; Hollande, François (1954–) – Biographies.
- Bernard, Daniel Madame Royal ([Paris]: Jacob-Duvernet, impr. 2005) ISBN 2-84724-091-8, subject(s): Royal, Ségolène (1953–) – Biographies; France—Politique et gouvernement—1958–.
- Désir d'avenir ([Paris] : Flammarion, [September 2006]) ISBN 2-08-068805-7.
- Malouines-Me La Madone et le Culbuto – Ou l'Inlassable Ambition de Ségolène Royal et François Hollande ([Paris]: Fayard, [5 April 2006]), series: LITT.GENE, ISBN 2-213-62354-6.
- Maintenant – Ségolène Royal répond à Marie-Françoise Colombani. (Hachette Littérature et Flammarion, 2007), ISBN 2012372465.
- Ma plus belle histoire, C'EST VOUS. (Grasset, 2007), ISBN 2246736110.
- Femme Debout. (Denoël, 2009), ISBN 2207260984.
- Lettre à tous les résignés et indignés qui veulent des solutions. (Plon, 2011), ISBN 2259210554.
- Cette belle idée du courage. (Grasset, 2013), ISBN 2246804590.
- Refusez la cruauté du monde ! Le temps d’aimer est venu, (Rocher, 2023).

National Assembly of France
Preceded by Jean-Pierre Marché	Deputy of the National Assembly from Deux-Sèvres' 2nd constituency 1988–2007	Succeeded by Delphine Batho
Political offices
Preceded by Brice Lalonde	Minister of the Environment and Way of Life; 1992–1993	Succeeded by Michel Barnier
Preceded by Élisabeth Morin	President of the Regional Council of Poitou-Charentes; 2004–2014	Succeeded by Jean-François Macaire
Preceded by Philippe Martin	Minister of Ecology, Sustainable Development and Energy; 2014–2017	Succeeded by Nicolas Hulot
