= Yves Piétrasanta =

French politician (1939–2022)

Mayor of Mèze
- In office 1977–2001
- Preceded by: Georges Jean
- Succeeded by: Yvon Pibre

Member of the European Parliament for France
- In office July 20, 1999 – February 2, 2004
- Succeeded by: Marie-Françoise Duthu

Personal details
- Born: 19 August 1939; Mèze, Hérault, France
- Died: 28 May 2022 (aged 82)
- Political party: Radical Party of the Left (until 1991); Ecology Generation (1991–1997); The Greens (1998–2008)

Yves Piétrasanta (19 August 1939 – 28 May 2022) was a French politician. He served as the mayor of Mèze from 1977 to 2001. Piétrasanta also served as The Greens Member of the European Parliament for France. He was a president candidate of the Génération Ecologie in 2012, later withdrawing on 7 February 2012 and joining another politician, François Hollande's campaign team. In 2018, he retired from the leadership of Génération Ecologie and was succeeded by Delphine Batho.

Piétrasanta died in May 2022, at the age of 82.
