= Salima Yenbou =

French school administrator and politician (born 1971)

Salima Yenbou MEP
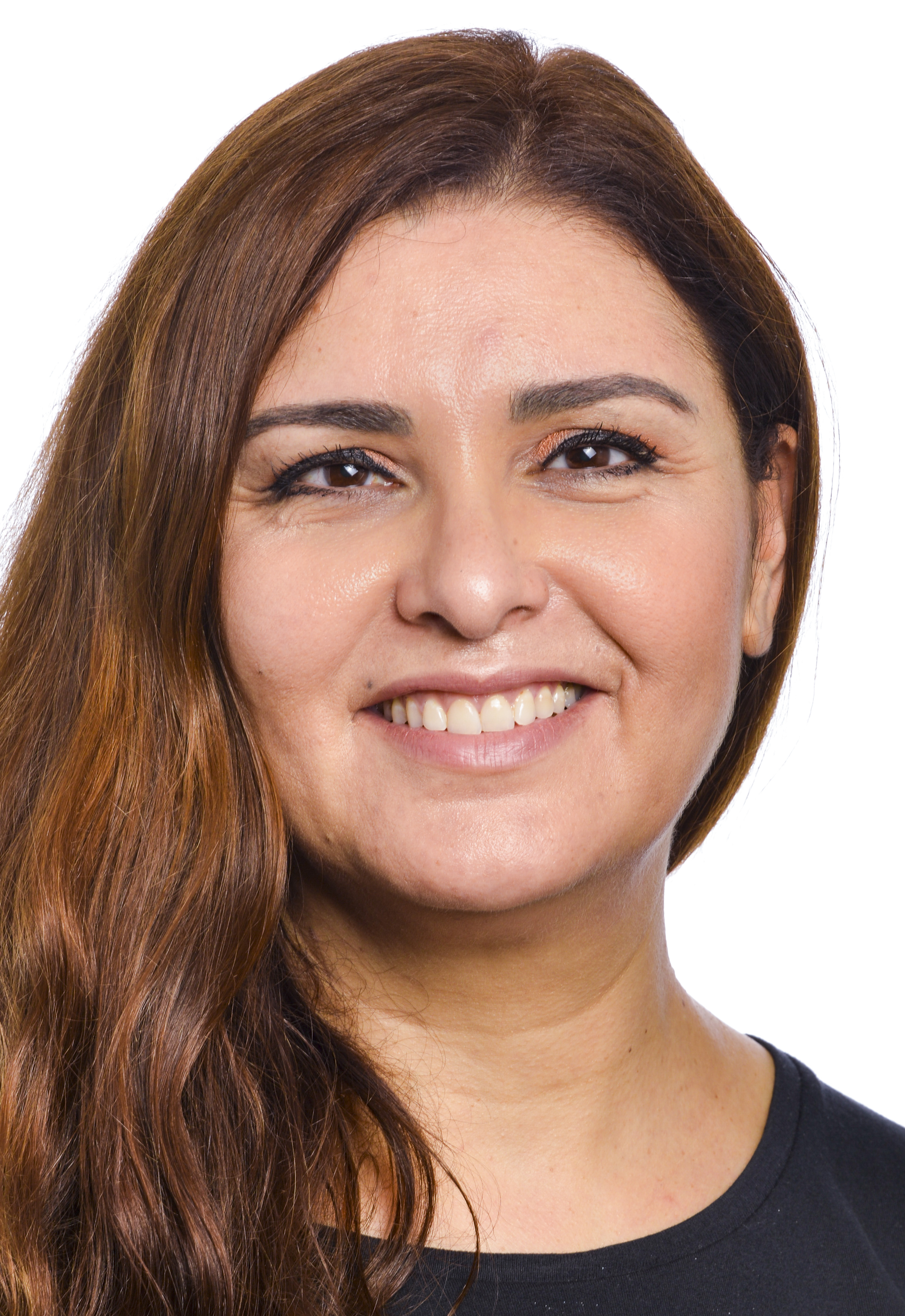

Member of the European Parliament for France
- In office 2 July 2019 – 2024

Personal details
- Born: 14 March 1971 (age 55) Aubervilliers, France
- Party: Cap Écologie (CE)

Salima Yenbou (born 14 March 1971) is a French school administrator and politician who served as a Member of the European Parliament from 2019 to 2024.

== Political career ==
In parliament, Yenbou served on the Committee on Foreign Affairs and on the Committee on Culture and Education. In 2022, she joined the Committee of Inquiry to investigate the use of Pegasus and equivalent surveillance spyware.

In addition to her committee assignments, Yenbou was part of the Parliament's delegation to the Parliamentary Assembly of the Union for the Mediterranean. She was also a member of the European Parliament Intergroup on Anti-Racism and Diversity, the European Parliament Intergroup on LGBT Rights and the European Parliament Intergroup on Western Sahara. She was part of the Inter-Parliamentary Alliance on China.

On 8 March 2022 Yenbou announced that she would be joining the Renew Europe group in the European Parliament after having declared her support to Emmanuel Macron in the run-up of the 2022 French presidential election.
