= Deux-Sèvres's 2nd constituency =

Constituency of the National Assembly of France

2nd constituency of Deux-Sèvres
- inline Constituency of the National Assembly of France
- Deputy: Delphine Batho; GE
- Department: Deux-Sèvres
- Cantons: Beauvoir-sur-Niort, Brioux-sur-Boutonne, Celles-sur-Belle, Chef-Boutonne, Frontenay-Rohan-Rohan, Lezay, Mauzé-sur-le-Mignon, Melle, La Mothe-Saint-Héraym, Saint-Maixent-l'École-1, Saint-Maixent-l'École-2, Sauzé-Vaussais

The 2nd constituency of Deux-Sèvres is a French legislative constituency in the Deux-Sèvres département.

== Deputies ==
| Election | Member | Party |
|---|---|---|
| 1958 | Jacques Fouchier | CNIP |
| 1962 | Jacques Fouchier | CNIP |
| 1967 | Jacques Fouchier | CNIP |
| 1968 | Jacques Fouchier | CNIP |
| 1973 | Jacques Fouchier | CDP |
| 1978 | Jacques Fouchier | UDF |
| 1978 | Jean Pineau | UDF |
| 1981 | Jacques Fouchier | DVD |
| 1986 | Proportional representation - no election by constituency | |
| 1988 | Ségolène Royal | PS |
| 1993 | Ségolène Royal | PS |
| 1997 | Ségolène Royal | PS |
| 2002 | Ségolène Royal | PS |
| 2007 | Delphine Batho | PS |
| 2012 | Delphine Batho | PS |
| 2017 | Delphine Batho | PS |
| 2018 | Delphine Batho | GE |
| 2022 | Delphine Batho | GE |

== Election results ==
=== 2024 ===
Legislative Election 2024: Deux-Sèvres's 2nd constituency
| Party | Candidate | Votes | % | ±% |
|---|---|---|---|---|
| LÉ–EELV (NFP) | Delphine Batho | 25,435 | 38.57 | +2.19 |
| LR | Émilie Baudrez | 6,107 | 9.26 | +2.92 |
| REC | Guy Bourdon | 760 | 1.15 | −1.74 |
| RN | Mélody Garault | 22,500 | 34.12 | +14.70 |
| MoDem (Ensemble) | Frédéric Bizard | 10,536 | 15.98 | −9.10 |
| LO | Roger Gorizzutti | 607 | 0.92 | −0.14 |
| Turnout | | 65,945 | 96.61 | +46.44 |
| Registered electors | | 98,054 | | |
2nd round result
| LÉ–EELV | Delphine Batho | 37,808 | 59.21 | +57.88 |
| RN | Mélody Garault | 26,048 | 40.79 | N/A |
| Turnout | | 63,856 | 93.40 | +45.75 |
| Registered electors | | 98,055 | | |
| LÉ–EELV hold | | Swing | | |

=== 2022 ===
Legislative Election 2022: Deux-Sèvres's 2nd constituency
| Party | Candidate | Votes | % | ±% |
|---|---|---|---|---|
| GE (NUPÉS) | Delphine Batho | 17,477 | 36.38 | -6.56 |
| MoDem (Ensemble) | Cécilia Rochefort | 12,049 | 25.08 | -6.52 |
| RN | Carine Revers | 9,328 | 19.42 | +8.32 |
| PS | Gaël Joseph* | 3,492 | 7.27 | N/A |
| LR (UDC) | Emilie Baudrez | 3,048 | 6.34 | −6.39 |
| REC | Roland Sainty | 1,389 | 2.89 | N/A |
| LP (UPF) | Valérie Dupuy | 748 | 1.56 | N/A |
| LO | Roger Gorizzutti | 507 | 1.06 | +0.30 |
| Turnout | | 48,038 | 50.17 | −1.42 |
2nd round result
| GE (NUPÉS) | Delphine Batho | 25,011 | 57.88 | +0.94 |
| MoDem (Ensemble) | Cécilia Rochefort | 18,200 | 42.12 | −0.94 |
| Turnout | | 43,211 | 47.65 | +2.61 |
| GE gain from PS | | | | |

* PS dissident, not supported by NUPES.

=== 2017 ===
Legislative Election 2017: Deux-Sèvres's 2nd constituency
| Party | Candidate | Votes | % | ±% |
|---|---|---|---|---|
| LREM | Christine Heintz | 15,875 | 31.60 | N/A |
| PS | Delphine Batho | 14,970 | 29.79 | −23.39 |
| LR | Séverine Vachon | 6,395 | 12.73 | N/A |
| FN | Jean-Romée Charbonneau | 5,577 | 11.10 | +1.63 |
| LFI | Yannick Maillou | 5,319 | 10.59 | N/A |
| EELV | Laurence Réau | 1,284 | 2.56 | −0.46 |
| Others | N/A | 824 | | |
| Turnout | | 50,244 | 51.59 | −6.88 |
2nd round result
| PS | Delphine Batho | 24,970 | 56.94 | N/A |
| LREM | Christine Heintz | 18,886 | 43.06 | N/A |
| Turnout | | 43,856 | 45.04 | N/A |
| PS hold | | | | |

=== 2012 ===
Legislative Election 2012: Deux-Sèvres's 2nd constituency
| Party | Candidate | Votes | % | ±% |
|---|---|---|---|---|
| PS | Delphine Batho | 30,226 | 53.18 | |
| NM | Xavier Argenton | 13,523 | 23.79 | |
| FN | Philippe Maurin | 5,384 | 9.47 | |
| PG | Christine Antoine | 2,416 | 4.25 | |
| EELV | Geneviève Paillaud | 1,718 | 3.02 | |
| DLR | Benjamin Roux | 1,149 | 2.02 | |
| Others | N/A | 2,422 | | |
| Turnout | | 56,838 | 58.47 | |
| PS hold | | | | |

=== 2007 ===
Legislative Election 2007: Deux-Sèvres's 2nd constituency
| Party | Candidate | Votes | % | ±% |
|---|---|---|---|---|
| PS | Delphine Batho | 20,690 | 44.56 | |
| UMP | Jean-Pierre Griffault | 16,131 | 34.74 | |
| MoDem | Simone Gendreau-Donnefort | 2,947 | 6.35 | |
| LV | Geneviève Paillaud | 1,539 | 3.31 | |
| MPF | Iris Tisserand | 1,454 | 3.13 | |
| Far left | Gisèle Sicot | 1,441 | 3.10 | |
| FN | Jean-Romée Charbonneau | 1,454 | 3.13 | |
| Others | N/A | 919 | | |
| Turnout | | 47,691 | 64.78 | |
2nd round result
| PS | Delphine Batho | 26,524 | 57.42 | |
| UMP | Jean-Pierre Griffault | 19,669 | 42.58 | |
| Turnout | | 47,397 | 64.34 | |
| PS hold | | | | |

=== 2002 ===
Legislative Election 2002: Deux-Sèvres's 2nd constituency
| Party | Candidate | Votes | % | ±% |
|---|---|---|---|---|
| PS | Ségolène Royal | 21,816 | 46.21 | |
| UMP | Valerie Cauvin | 16,148 | 34.21 | |
| FN | Lucie Chaumeron | 2,433 | 5.15 | |
| LV | Genevieve Paillaud | 1,220 | 2.58 | |
| CPNT | Alain Bernelas | 1,162 | 2.46 | |
| DIV | Guy Melani | 1,145 | 2.43 | |
| Others | N/A | 3,282 | | |
| Turnout | | 48,326 | 68.73 | |
2nd round result
| PS | Ségolène Royal | 25,123 | 55.05 | |
| UMP | Valerie Cauvin | 20,515 | 44.95 | |
| Turnout | | 46,732 | 66.46 | |
| PS hold | | | | |

=== 1997 ===
Legislative Election 1997: Deux-Sèvres's 2nd constituency
| Party | Candidate | Votes | % | ±% |
|---|---|---|---|---|
| PS | Ségolène Royal | 22,426 | 49.11 | |
| UDF | Léopold Moreau | 13,850 | 30.33 | |
| FN | Pierre Lucas | 3,325 | 7.28 | |
| PCF | Max Rouvreau | 2,678 | 5.86 | |
| DVD | Phiilippe Grandin | 1,535 | 3.36 | |
| Far left | Marinette Veyssiere | 1,304 | 2.86 | |
| DIV | Guy Melani | 547 | 1.20 | |
| Turnout | | 48,912 | 72.70 | |
2nd round result
| PS | Ségolène Royal | 29,377 | 61.82 | |
| UDF | Léopold Moreau | 18,147 | 38.18 | |
| Turnout | | 50,033 | 74.36 | |
| PS hold | | | | |

== Sources ==
"Résultats électoraux officiels en France" (in French). 2007.

"Résultats électoraux officiels en France" (in French). 2002.
