= Giorgos Kyrtsos =

Greek politician

Giorgos Kyrtsos MEP
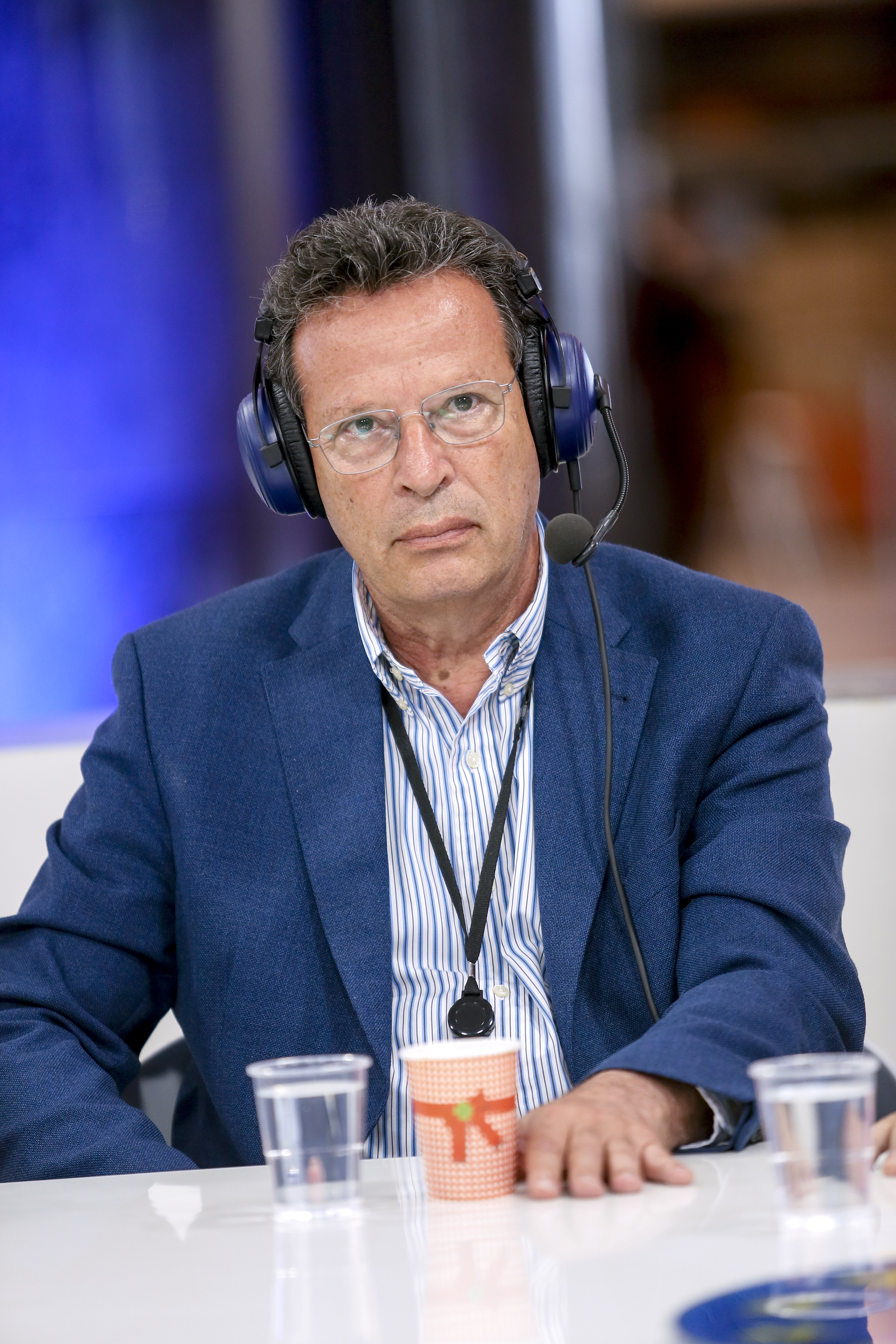

Member of the European Parliament for Greece

Personal details
- Born: 4 June 1952 (age 73) Athens, Greece
- Party: European People's Party (2019–2022); Renew Europe (2022–2023)

Giorgos Kyrtsos (Greek: Γιώργος Κύρτσος) is a Greek journalist and politician who served as a Member of the European Parliament from 2014 until 2024.

== Early life and education ==
Kyrtsos was born on 4 June 1952 in Athens, Greece. His parents placed him in the prestigious College of Athens, a private school on the outskirts of Athens run by the Hellenic-American Educational Foundation. Other notable alumni in Greek politics include Andreas Papandreou (1938), Lucas Papademos (1966), Antonis Samaras (1970), George Papandreou (1971), and Kyriakos Mitsotakis (1986), all of whom went on to serve as Prime Minister of Greece.

He moved to the United States to study at the Massachusetts Institute of Technology (MIT), graduating with a BSc in Industrial Management in 1975. He returned to Europe thereafter to continue his higher education at the London School of Economics (LSE) in the United Kingdom, where he obtained an MSc in European Studies in 1976 before completing his PhD in International Relations in 1980. The title of his doctoral thesis was: "The politics of Western European socialists in Portugal, Spain and Greece, 1968-1980".

== Member of the European Parliament, 2014–2024 ==
In parliament, Kyrtsos served on the Committee on Economic and Monetary Affairs from 2014 onwards. In 2019, he also joined the Committee on Foreign Affairs.

In addition to his committee assignments, Kyrtsos took part in the European Parliament's delegations for relations with the NATO Parliamentary Assembly (2014–2019) and with the Arab Peninsula (2019-2024).

Kyrtsos was expelled from New Democracy on 18 February 2022 following his criticism of the government of Prime Minister Kyriakos Mitsotakis for curtailing press freedom. On 4 May 2022, he left the EPP and joined Renew Europe.

== Political positions ==
In 2019, Kyrtsos publicly endorsed policy proposals put forward by Greek Solution founder Kyriakos Velopoulos according which illegal immigrants to Greece are to be sent to remote, uninhabited islands to await deportation.

In November 2021, Kyrtsos joined a group of seven Members of the European Parliament led by Raphaël Glucksmann to Taiwan to send a strong signal in support of the self-ruling island, despite a threat of retaliation from China.

In 2022, Kyrtsos and his colleague Markus Ferber tabled several amendments to paragraphs relating to the European Central Bank's climate strategy in a report by the Parliament, criticizing ECB President Christine Lagarde's plan to take greater account of the environment in core policy decisions as a "distraction" from the bank's duty to tame inflation.
