= Ecology Generation =

Ecology Generation Génération écologie
- Leader: Delphine Batho
- Founded: 1990
- Headquarters: 25, avenue Jean-Jaurès; F-75019 Paris
- Ideology: Green politics Degrowth; Integral ecology Eco-feminism; Pro-Europeanism
- Political position: Left-wing (since 2018); Formerly; Centre-left to centre-right
- National affiliation: New Popular Front (since 2024); Ecologist Pole (since 2020); New Ecologic and Social People's Union (2022–2023)
- Colours: Green
- National Assembly: 1 / 577

Website
- generationecologie.fr

Ecology Generation (French: Génération écologie) is one of the four green parties in France, along with The Ecologists (Les Écologistes), the Independent Ecological Movement (Mouvement Ecologiste Indépendant), and Cap Écologie. Founded in 1990 by Brice Lalonde, Environment Minister, upon the suggestion of President François Mitterrand, it describes itself as a club with cross-party alliances of green-minded politicians and public servants. It moved away from the "presidential majority" in 1992, when Brice Lalonde left the cabinet.

The party, in alliance with The Greens obtained about 14% of the vote in the 1992 French regional elections; but the 1993 legislative election was disappointing for the Green-GE alliance, as it failed to win any seats and won only 7% (other ecologist parties brought the score up to 11%), when polls had given them up to 16%.

Noël Mamère was the movement's vice-president from 1992 to 1994, when he was excluded from the party and founded the Ecology-Solidarity Convergence, which later joined The Greens. Unlike many green parties, which are traditionally associated with the left-wing, Génération écologie presents itself as a centrist ecologist party. This is despite its early allegiance with the Socialist Party in the 1990s, and how for a time in the early 2000s it was nicknamed 'The Blues,' after the traditional colour of conservatism, and was associated with the centre-right UMP under Jacques Chirac from 2002 to 2004.

Génération écologie has cooperated since the 2004 elections with several other movements that share its priorities. It has worked alongside various organisations, most prominently the Federalist Party, the Centre of Handicapped Democrats, and the Vanquish Unemployment Association.

France Gamerre replaced Brice Lalonde as leader and she aimed to run in the 2007 French presidential election. Like her predecessor, she failed to win the 500 endorsements. In the 2009 European Parliament election, the party ran as part of the Independent Ecological Movement which won 3.63% of the vote.

On 2 May 2018, former minister of Ecology Delphine Batho left the Socialist Party and joined Ecology Generation. She was elected as new party president on 10 September 2018.

== Leaders ==
- 1991-2002: Brice Lalonde
- 2002-2008: France Gamerre
- 2008-2011: Jean-Noël Debroise
- 2011-2018: Yves Piétrasanta
- since 2018: Delphine Batho
