= Delphine Batho =

French politician

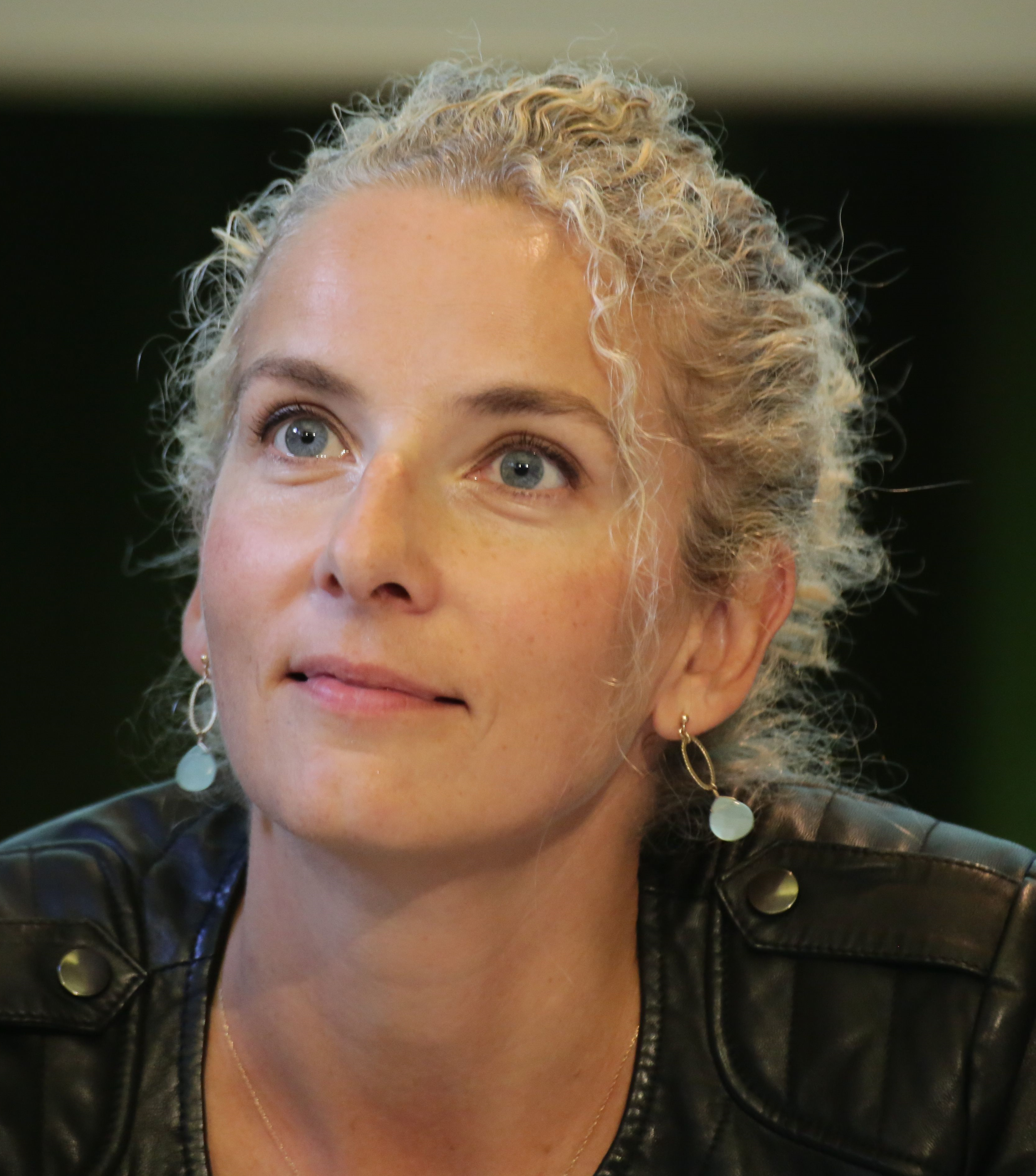
- Delphine Batho in 2015

Member of the National Assembly for Deux-Sèvres's 2nd constituency
- Incumbent
- Assumed office 2 August 2013
- Preceded by: Jean-Luc Drapeau
- In office 20 June 2012 – 21 July 2012
- Preceded by: Jean-Luc Drapeau
- Succeeded by: Jean-Luc Drapeau
- In office 20 June 2007 – 16 June 2012
- Preceded by: Ségolène Royal
- Succeeded by: Jean-Luc Drapeau

Minister of Ecology, Sustainable Development and Energy
- In office 22 June 2012 – 2 July 2013
- Prime Minister: Jean-Marc Ayrault
- Preceded by: Nicole Bricq
- Succeeded by: Philippe Martin

Minister Delegate for Justice
- In office 16 May 2012 – 18 June 2012
- Prime Minister: Function created
- Preceded by: Function deleted
- Succeeded by: Philippe Martin

Personal details
- Born: 23 March 1973 (age 53) Paris, France
- Party: Ecology Generation (since 2018)
- Other political affiliations: Socialist Party (until 2018); Political group: Ecology Democracy Solidarity (2020)
- Education: Lycée Henri-IV

Delphine Batho (French pronunciation: [dɛlfin bato]; born 23 March 1973 in Paris) is a French politician of Ecology Generation who has been serving as member of the National Assembly. She is a former Minister of Ecology, Sustainable Development and Energy. As a candidate in the 2021 ecologist primary, she came in third place with 22.32% of the vote, advocating degrowth. She was re-elected as a member of parliament in the 2022 legislative elections.

== Early life and education ==
Batho is the daughter of French photographers Claude Batho and John Batho. She attended the Lycée Henri-IV in Paris.

== Early activism ==
=== President of the FIDL ===
Batho began her militant activity in the high-school students' union FIDL (Fédération indépendante et démocratique lycéenne) while attending the Lycée Henri-IV in Paris. She was elected president of the union in 1990 and became well known for her activism on behalf of students' rights and for the means to study. Following nearly two months of strikes the movement obtained from Lionel Jospin, the Minister for Education, a pledge to spend 4.5 million francs on renovating high schools and to protect certain student rights. In 1992 she left high school, and thus the FIDL, to study history.

=== Vice-President of SOS Racisme ===
Batho joined the anti-racist movement SOS Racisme and when its leadership was renewed in September 1992 Fodé Sylla, aged 29, became president and Batho, a representative of the "second generation SOS" in the words of Le Monde, was elected vice-president.

== Political career ==
=== Career in the Socialist Party ===
Batho joined the French Socialist Party (Parti Socialiste – PS) in the mid-1990s as a militant in the Grigny (Essonne) section. She participated, together with Julien Dray, in the party's Socialist Left tendency. At the party's Grenoble Congress she was elected to the national executive committee of the PS. In 2003, during the breakup of the socialist left, she remained loyal to Dray, who employed her at the Île-de-France Regional Council, where she was responsible for security matters. In 2004 she became National Secretary of the PS in charge of security, where she defended the policy of preventative sanctions.

Her thoughts on security matters were taken into account by Ségolène Royal, the PS's candidate in the French Presidential Election of 2007, who incorporated them into her "just order".

Batho declared her intention to be a candidate for the leadership of the Socialist Party at the Aubervilliers Congress in 2018, but her application was ultimately rejected due to a lack of support. Batho announced in an interview published on 2 May 2018 that she was quitting the Socialist Party to become president of Ecology Generation, and would also quit the New Left group in the National Assembly.

=== Member of the National Assembly, 2007–2012 ===
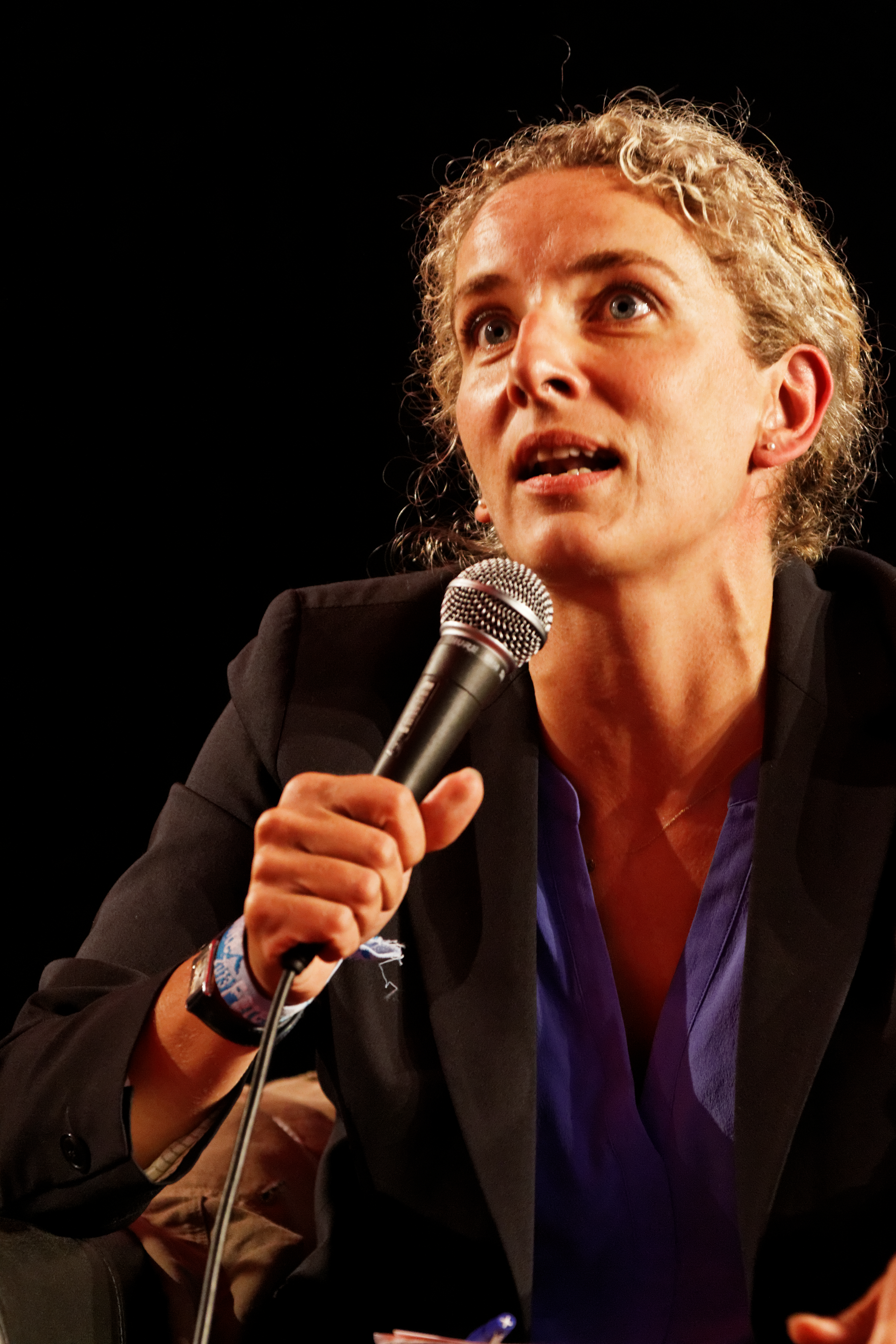
Delphine Batho in 2013

In the parliamentary elections of 2007, Batho was the PS's candidate in the 2nd constituency of Deux-Sèvres, which Ségolène Royal had represented before running in the presidential election of that year. In the PS internal nomination contest, she received 54.75% of the vote as against 45.25% for Éric Gauthier, Royal's former substitute.

In the first round of the elections, held on 10 June, she received 20,690 votes (a 44.55% share), ahead of the second-placed Jean-Pierre Griffault, who received 16,131 votes (34.73%) for the UMP. In the second, run-off round, Griffault gained a 42.58% share (19,669 votes), and Batho was elected with 57.42% of the total ballot (26,524 votes).

Batho served as Royal's spokesperson in 2009 for the 2011 French Socialist Party presidential primary, alongside Najat Vallaud-Belkacem.

In the legislative elections of 2012, Batho was re-elected in the first round with 53.18% of the votes cast in the 2nd constituency of Deux-Sèvres, modified following the redistribution of the French legislative constituencies in 2010. After her election as president of Ecology Generation, she left the New Left group in the National Assembly and joined the non-registered.

=== Career in government, 2012–2013 ===
On 16 May 2012, Batho was appointed Minister Delegate for Justice. During the legislative elections, she was re-elected as a deputy in the first round. Without sufficiently precise attributions within the Ayrault I government, and after a month of difficult relations with her supervising minister, she obtained the full-service portfolio of Minister of Ecology, Sustainable Development and Energy on 21 June 2012 in the Ayrault government composed after the legislative elections.

Under Batho's leadership, a law was revised to revise the mining lawon the exploitation of conventional hydrocarbons, as well as another giving the State, like EDF, the power to decide the closure of nuclear power plants, the first to be that of Fessenheim. She supports the decision to continue building an airport at Notre-Dame-des Landes.

On 2 July 2013 the President of the Republic announced that he was terminating Batho's duties as Minister of Ecology, Sustainable Development and Energy following an interview in which she described as "bad "The 2014 budget of his ministry and admitted" [his] disappointment with the government ".

On 4 July 2013, at a press conference, she said: I did not make a mistake or a mistake. The government, she adds, marks a turning point in terms of the desire to complete the ecological transition. It is the turning point of rigor which does not say its name and which prepares the march to power for the extreme right in our country. [...] Certain economic forces [...] did not accept the level of ambition set for the energy transition. [...] Is it normal that the CEO of Vallourec, Philippe Crouzet, announced my upcoming fall weeks ago in the United States.

=== Member of the National Assembly, 2017–present ===
During the 2017 French legislative election, Batho was re-elected with 56.94% of the vote against the LREM's candidate, Christine Heintz (43.06%), who had preceded her during the first round and had received the support of Ségolène Royal. In parliament, she serves on the Committee on Economic Affairs.

In 2018, Batho initiated the amendment to ban glyphosate with a term in 2021; his proposal is massively rejected, and she denounces the acts of lobbyists in the National Assembly.Indeed, Agrochemical interests were able to obtain the Batho's amendment before the members of the National Assembly.

In November 2019, Batho's amendment to the anti-waste bill, aimed at banning Black Friday promotions by including them as "aggressive commercial practices", was adopted in committee.

=== President of Generation ecology ===
On 2 May 2018, Batho announced that she would be leaving the Socialist Party and that she will take over the helm of Ecology Generation in September, succeeding Yves Piétrasanta. She also left the New Left group in the National Assembly and joined the non-registered. She is elected new president of Ecology Generation on 10 September 2018.

In May 2020, Batho joined and became vice-president of the new group Ecology Democracy Solidarity, essentially composed of former members of the group La République en Marche; however, the group was dissolved later that year.

Batho pleads for an alliance of environmentalists for the 2022 presidential election.
