= Cap21 =

Green political party in France

Citizenship, Action, Participation for the 21st Century Citoyenneté, action, participation pour le xxi^{e} siècle
- President: Corinne Lepage
- Founded: 28 October 1996
- Merged into: Cap Ecology
- Headquarters: 40, rue Monceau; F-75008 Paris
- Ideology: Green liberalism; Direct democracy; Humanism; Soft Euroscepticism
- Political position: Centre
- Colours: Green, Blue

Website
- CAP21

The Citizenship, Action, Participation for the 21st Century (French: Citoyenneté, action, participation pour le xxi^{e} siècle) was a minor green liberal political party in France, founded by Corinne Lepage in 1996 as a political reflection club.

It became a political party in June 2000. Lepage was the party's candidate in the 2002 presidential election and obtained 1.88% of the vote. Lepage claimed to stand for an independent and centrist green voice, as opposed to Noël Mamère, candidate for the more left-wing Green Party. The party later refused to join the new centre-right Union for a Popular Movement (UMP).

In 2007, after dropping out of the presidential race, Lepage endorsed François Bayrou's centrist candidacy and CAP21 ran around 20 candidates with Bayrou's new Democratic Movement in the subsequent legislative election. It failed to have any candidates elected.

CAP 21 became an associate party of Bayrou's MoDem on June 15, 2008. Corinne Lepage became a high-ranking member of the MoDem's leadership, serving as a Vice President. In the 2009 European elections, Corinne Lepage was elected Member of the European Parliament for North-West France as the MoDem's top candidate in the region.

However, the party split from the MoDem in the runup to the 2010 regional elections and pursued an alliance with Europe Écologie. Cap 21 was allied with Europe Écologie in Alsace, Languedoc-Roussillon, Lorraine, Pays de la Loire, Provence-Alpes-Côte d'Azur and Upper Normandy and was allied with the MoDem in Burgundy and Picardy. Following the MoDem's poor result (4.2%) in the regional elections, Lepage announced her resignation from the MoDem and announced that she would propose separation from the MoDem at the party's next congress. Members voted to leave the MoDem in May 2010.

Lepage subsequently failed to obtain the 500 endorsements necessary to run in the 2012 presidential election.

In May 2013, several leading members from the right of the party departed. Some went on to form New Democratic Ecology (French: Nouvelle écologie démocrate), allied to the Union of Democrats and Independents.

On 27 February 2021, after 25 years of existence, Cap21 merges with the Independent Ecological Alliance of Jean-Marc Governatori to form Cap Ecology.
