= Cap Écologie =

Cap Ecology Cap écologie
- Abbreviation: CE
- Co-presidents: Corinne Lepage; Jean-Marc Governatori
- General Secretaries: François Damerval; Patrice Miran
- Founded: 27 February 2021
- Merger of: Cap21; AEI
- Headquarters: 40 rue de Monceau. Paris
- Ideology: Green politics Green liberalism Social progressivism Ecofeminism
- Political position: Centre to centre-left
- National affiliation: Ecologist pole
- Colours: Green; Light blue
- National Assembly: 0 / 577
- Senate: 0 / 343
- European Parliament: 1 / 74

Website
- capecologie.fr

Cap Ecology (CE; French: Cap écologie) is a French political party created on 27 February 2021, resulting from the merger of Cap21 and the Independent Ecological Alliance (AEI).

== History ==
On March 14, 2012, Jean-Marc Governatori launched a public partnership offer to Corinne Lepage so that a representative of independent ecology would be present in the first round of the presidential election. The candidate for the Independent Ecological Alliance offers the former minister reciprocal support and sponsorship for whoever has the most signatures today. Jean-Marc Governatori laid down as a prerequisite a programmatic agreement, and the lasting affirmation of independent ecology in France in the perspective of the 2012 legislative election and the 2014 municipal elections.

On February 27, 2021, Cap21 and the Independent Ecologist Alliance merged to found Cap Ecology. The following July 7, Cap21, whose administrative merger with the AEI has not yet registered for the primary, is excluded from the Ecologist Pole, due to a disagreement on secularism and the Republic between Corinne Lepage, former minister of Jacques Chirac, and Europe Ecology – The Greens; the Independent Environmental Alliance remains a member of the coalition.

== Political position ==
The party says it seeks "to promote a popular, republican and responsible ecology".

== Leadership ==
=== Political office ===
In 2021, the party's political bureau is composed as follows:

- Co-presidents: Corinne Lepage and Jean-Marc Governatori;
- General Secretaries: François Damerval and Patrice Miran;
- Members: Béatrice Hovnanian, Rachid Mokran, Chantal Cutajar, Stéphane Gemmani, Fazia Hamiche, Charles Girardin, Caroline Regin, Ghislain Wisocinski, Salima Yenbou, Franck Poirier, Sophie Spennato, Jean Rapenne, Fanny Puppinck and Noël Dedji.

=== Regional delegates ===
Cap Ecology has the following regional delegates:

- Grand Est: Chantal Cutajar and Ghislain Wyzocinski
- Nouvelle-Aquitaine: Didier Cugy and Camille Lavoux
- Bourgogne-Franche-Comté: Jean Rapenne and Fabien Robert
- Brittany: Franck Poirier et Fabrice Le Calvez
- Centre-Val de Loire: Charles Girardin, Nicole Combredet
- Île-de-France: François Damerval, Rachid Mokran and Fetta Mellas
- Normandy: Béatrice Hovnanian, Jonas Massieu and Florence Filuzeau
- Occitanie: Stéphan Arnassant and Vincent Rivet-Martel
- Hauts-de-France: Alexandre Garcin and Philippe Normand
- Pays de la Loire: Grégoire Jauneault and Gauthier Dupont
- Provence-Alpes-Côte d'Azur: Jean-Marc Governatori
- Auvergne-Rhône-Alpes: Stéphane Gemmani and Sophie Spennato
- Corsica: Jean-François Baccarelli
- Overseas France: Maylis Lapouble

== Elected members ==
Caroline Roose and Salima Yenbou from the AEI were elected as MEPs in the 2019 election on the list led by Yannick Jadot (EELV). They sit in the group of the Greens/EFA. Roose left Cap Écologie in May 2021, criticizing the party's decision to present an electoral list competing with other environmental groups in the 2021 regional elections in Provence-Alpes-Côte d'Azur.
