= 2018 French Guiana's 2nd constituency by-election =

- 4 March 2018 (first round); 11 March 2018 (second round)
- Turnout: 34.76% ▲8.67% (first round); 41.52% ▲6.42% (second round)
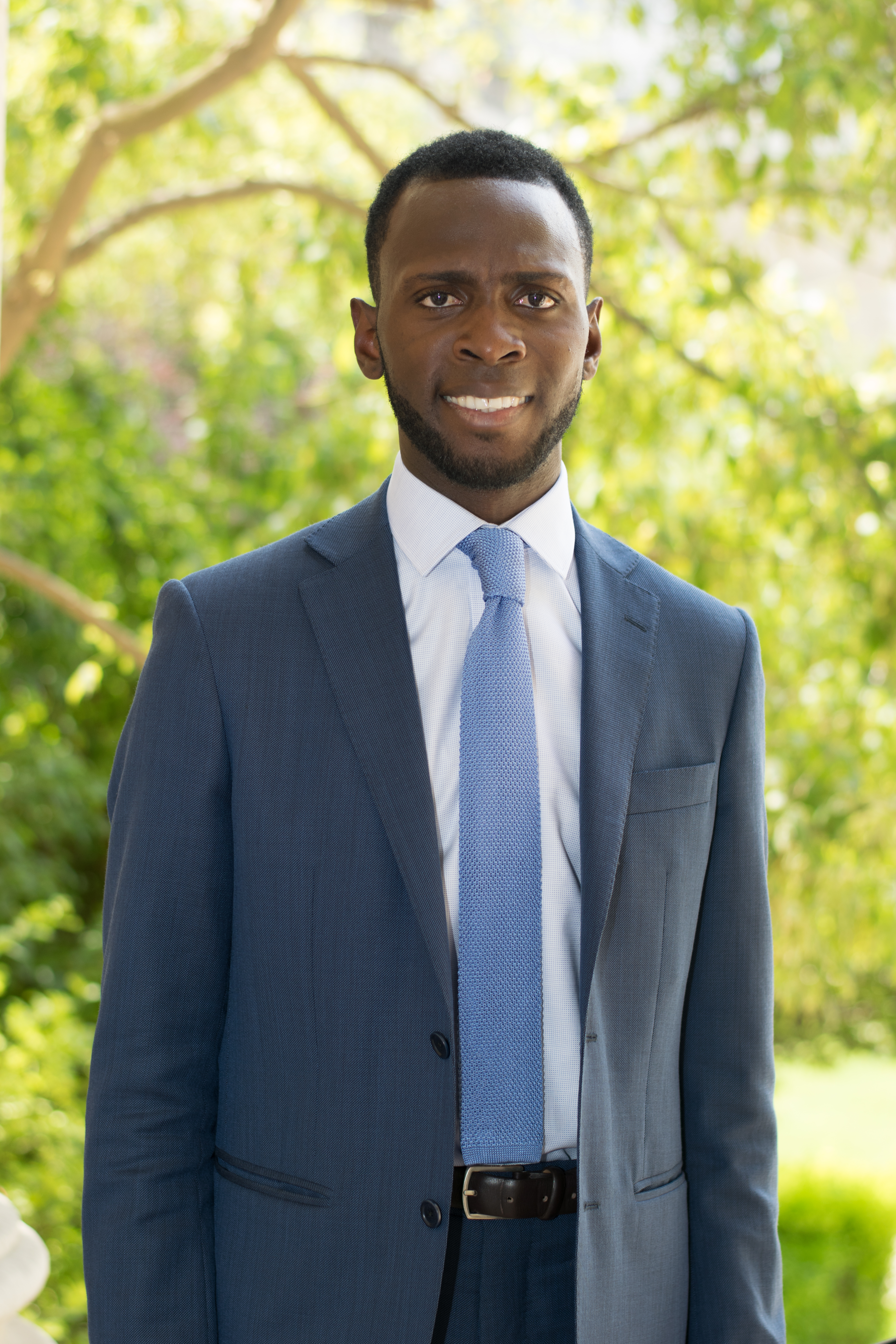

Nominee	Lénaïck Adam	Davy Rimane	David Riché
Party	LREM	LFI	PSG
1st round %	5,927; 43.10% ▲6.65%	4,830; 35.12% ▲14.84%	1,385; 10.07% ▲10.07%
2nd round %	8,320; 50.65% ▲0.44%	8,107; 49.35% ▼0.44%	Eliminated
Deputy before election
Lénaïck Adam
LREM
Elected deputy
Lénaïck Adam
LREM

A by-election was held in French Guiana's 2nd constituency on 4 March 2018, with a second round on 11 March as no candidate secured a majority of votes in the first round. The by-election was called after the Constitutional Council invalidated the election of Lénaïck Adam, candidate of La République En Marche! (REM), in the June 2017 legislative elections on 8 December 2017.

As in June 2017, Adam narrowly defeated Davy Rimane, supported by La France Insoumise, in the second round.

== Background ==
Following the second round of the 2017 legislative election in French Guiana's 2nd constituency on 18 June, Davy Rimane, a regionalist candidate, filed an appeal with the Constitutional Council appealing the election of Lénaïck Adam of La République En Marche! (REM), claiming to have identified irregularities that would permit such an appeal.

On 8 December, the constitutional council annulled the election of Adam in the constituency, noting that per article R. 42 of the electoral code, each polling station is required to have two assessors; however, no assessor was present in polling stations 1 and 2 in the commune of Maripasoula, where 220 and 276 votes were cast, respectively. Because the electoral code was not respected, the result of the election was annulled and a by-election will be held to fill the vacant seat. On 20 January 2018, the first round of the by-election was scheduled for 4 March 2018, with a second round on 11 March should no candidate secure a majority of votes in the first round.

Declarations of candidacies were submitted between 5 and 9 February.

Polling stations will be open from 8:00 to 18:00 local time. The vast constituency, covering an area of 54,013.20 square kilometres (20,854.61 mi^{2}), includes the communes of Apatou, Awala-Yalimapo, Grand-Santi, Iracoubo, Kourou, Macouria, Mana, Maripasoula, Montsinéry-Tonnegrande, Papaïchton, Saint-Élie, Saint-Laurent-du-Maroni, Saül, and Sinnamary.

== Candidates and campaign ==
=== Lénaïck Adam (LREM) ===
Outgoing deputy Lénaïck Adam of La République En Marche! (REM) declared himself a candidate. A 26-year-old business executive, and graduate of Sciences Po, Adam was the first Bushinengue elected to the National Assembly. Adam was previously elected to the assembly of French Guiana in the 2015 election on the list led by territorial president Rodolphe Alexandre, whose party, Guyane Rassemblement, supported Adam in the by-election.

The Union of Democrats and Independents (UDI), traditionally allied to The Republicans (LR), surprised observers by backing Adam in the by-election, marking the first time that the party backed REM candidates. Adam was also supported by Gilles Adelson, mayor of Macouria. Leading Macron ally Christophe Castaner traveled to French Guiana from 23 to 26 February to campaign for Adam. A preliminary investigation into Adam for workplace harassment was opened at the end of 2017 following the filing of a complaint by a former parliamentary assistant. He was also attacked by his opponents in the by-election for his lack of legislative activity in the National Assembly.

=== Davy Rimane (LFI) ===
Davy Rimane, who narrowly lost to Adam in June 2017, also contested the by-election, this time with the backing of Jean-Luc Mélenchon's La France Insoumise (FI). During the 2017 social unrest in French Guiana, the 38-year-old led the Kolectif pou lagwiyann dékolé, serving as a spokesman during the protests, is part of the trade union EDF Guyane, and also currently serves as general secretary of the Union of Guianese Workers (UTG).

The decision of Mélenchon to back Rimane in the by-election was met with dissent among local supporters, some under the banner of "La Guyane Insoumise", with significant support within the local party for Richard Joigny. In response to these complaints, Mélenchon affirmed his party's support for Rimane, and said that the decision in Paris was made to avoid a result like that in June – when the party designated its own candidate, securing 1.37% of the vote – this time choosing to back a candidate who would be able to win. Rimane is the grand-nephew of Eustase Rimane, who served as mayor of Kourou for 42 years from 1953 to 1995. As in June, Rimane was backed by Léon Bertrand, who served in the government of Jacques Chirac and is currently mayor of Saint-Laurent-du-Maroni, later twice convicted in two judicial cases.

At his campaign launch on 17 February, Rimane received the support of Member of the European Parliament (MEP) Younous Omarjee as well as Gabriel Serville, deputy for French Guiana's 1st constituency, with FI deputy Danièle Obono also visiting in support starting on 21 February, with Omarjee and Obono later accompanying Mélenchon, who traveled to French Guiana to campaign for Rimane from 26 February to 5 March. During the 2017 presidential election, he came in first place with 24.72% of the vote in the first round, just ahead of Marine Le Pen with 24.29%. During the visit, Mélenchon denounced Castaner's travel by helicopter in French Guiana, questioning the financing of the trips; in response, the campaign stated that the trip was properly accounted for, that parts of the constituency are only accessible via air or water, and that the electoral code exempts travel expenses from spending limits.

=== Other candidates ===
==== David Riché ====
David Riché, the mayor of Roura and president of the Association of Mayors of French Guiana, also contested the by-election, a "parachutage" from the other constituency of the department. A "man of the left", he was first elected as mayor in 2008, and was selected as substitute to Chantal Berthelot, formerly a deputy for the constituency, in the 2007 legislative elections. In March 2017, he announced his intention to run in the 1st constituency of French Guiana before later renouncing the possibility. He received the official backing of the Guianese Socialist Party (PSG) after Mylène Mazia declared her candidacy before receiving the investiture of the party.

After a supporter discovered racist graffiti against Riché and posted a video of it on social media, public prosecutor Éric Vaillant announced the opening of an investigation by the authorities in Kourou to locate the person who wrote it. Riché was targeted by similar anti-white racism during his first mayoral campaign. After being eliminated in the first round, Riché backed Adam in the second round.

==== José Makébé ====
José Makébé, a 30-year-old business executive in Kourou, presented himself as a centrist candidate, having supported Adam in June rather than presenting his own candidacy. He ran without the official support of any party, though he previously served as a regional delegate of the UDI youth in French Guiana. Like Riché, he also announced his support for Adam in the second round.

==== Richard Joigny ====
Richard Joigny, the 34-year-old director of services of the town hall of Iracoubo who received 5.79% of the vote in June 2017, stood again under the banner of the Guianese Progressive Party (PPG), hoping to capture the left-wing vote in the by-election. He called for a "common left front", and hoped to receive the support of Berthelot as well as La Guyane Insoumise, which withdrew its support for Paul Persdam in the last few days before the first round in June to back Joigny.

==== Jean-Philippe Dolor ====
On 5 February, Jean-Philippe Dolor, former campaign director for Lénaïck Adam, youth leader of the Guianese Socialist Party, and general director of services for the town hall of Apatou, declared his surprise candidacy.

==== Jérôme Harbourg ====
Jérôme Harbourg was nominated by the National Front (FN), hoping to create a "surprise" by submitting his nomination papers within the final hours. At the age of 21, he is the youngest candidate in the by-election, studying at the University of the French West Indies and Guiana. Candidates were required declarations of their candidacies between 5 and 9 February.

==== Georges Mignot ====
Georges Mignot, a 47-year-old animation assistant, stood for the Popular Republican Union (UPR), replacing Nicolas Miray, who was initially designated as the party's candidate in the constituency. François Asselineau, president of the UPR, flew to French Guiana in order to campaign in support of Mignot from 25 February to 5 March.

==== Mylène Mazia ====
On 29 January, Mylène Mazia of the PSG declared her candidacy on behalf without having yet selected a substitute, but the PSG disavowed her candidacy, which had not been approved by the party. She claimed that she did not consult the party because she believed the outcome had been assured, having served as treasurer of the party and successfully directed the campaign of Gabriel Serville in 2012 and 2017. On 16 February, Mazia withdrew her candidacy following the death of her brother on 14 February.

=== Campaign debates ===
Two debates with four candidates each were broadcast by Guyane 1ère on 21 and 22 February at 20:00 local time, presented by Laurent Marot and Jessy Xavier. The first debate was held between Dolor, Harbourg, Joigny, and Mignot, and the second between Riché, Rimane, Adam, and Makébé.

== 2017 election result ==
First round results by commune

Second round results by commune

Candidate	Party	First round		Second round	
Candidate	Party	Votes	%	Votes	%
Lénaïck Adam	LREM	3,595	36.44	6,670	50.21
Davy Rimane	LFI	2,001	20.28	6,614	49.79
Chantal Berthelot	AGEG	1,919	19.45		
Jean-Étienne Antoinette	Walwari	934	9.47		
Richard Joigny	PPG	571	5.79		
Juliana Rimane	LR	429	4.35		
Paul Persdam	LFI	241	2.44		
Bernard Taddeï	UPR	175	1.77		
Votes		9,865	100.00	13,284	100.00
Valid votes		9,865	95.90	13,284	96.01
Blank votes		272	2.64	323	2.33
Null votes		150	1.46	229	1.66
Turnout		10,287	26.10	13,836	35.10
Abstentions		29,134	73.90	25,586	64.90
Registered voters		39,421		39,422	
Source: Ministry of the Interior, political parties * Incumbent deputy

== 2018 by-election result ==
First round results by commune

Second round results by commune

Candidate	Party	First round			Second round		
Candidate	Party	Votes	%	+/–	Votes	%	+/–
Lénaïck Adam	LREM	5,927	43.10	+6.65	8,320	50.65	+0.44
Davy Rimane	LFI	4,830	35.12	+14.84	8,107	49.35	–0.44
David Riché	PSG	1,385	10.07	+10.07			
José Makébé	DVD	683	4.97	+4.97			
Richard Joigny	PPG	305	2.22	–3.58			
Jean-Philippe Dolor	DVG	271	1.97	+1.97			
Jérôme Harbourg	FN	248	1.80	+1.80			
Georges Mignot	UPR	104	0.76	–1.02			
Mylène Mazia	DVG	0	0.00	–			
Votes		13,753	100.00	–	16,427	100.00	–
Valid votes		13,753	97.47	+1.57	16,427	97.48	+1.47
Blank votes		183	1.30	–1.35	258	1.53	–0.80
Null votes		174	1.23	–0.22	166	0.67	–0.99
Turnout		14,110	34.76	+8.67	16,851	41.52	+6.42
Abstentions		26,477	65.24	–8.67	23,737	58.48	–6.42
Registered voters		40,587			40,588		
Source: Préfecture de la Guyane, Préfecture de la Guyane
