= Opinion polling for the 2015 French regional elections =

This page lists public opinion polls conducted for the 2015 French regional elections, which were held in two rounds on 6 and 13 December 2015.

Unless otherwise noted, all polls listed below are compliant with the regulations of the national polling commission (Commission nationale des sondages) and utilize the quota method.

== National ==
=== First round ===
Polling firm	Fieldwork date	Sample size	Abs.	EXG	PCF	PCF-PG-EELV	EELV	PS-PRG	DVG	ECO	MoDem	UDI	LR-UDI-MoDem	DVD	DLF	FN	UPR	DIV
2015 election	6 Dec 2015	–	50.09%	1.54%	4.06%	2.80%	3.83%	23.43%	1.85%	0.59%	0.39%	0.01%	26.84%	0.66%	3.81%	27.73%	(DIV)	2.46%
Odoxa	3 Dec 2015	945	–	2%	7%		4.5%	22%	–	–	29%			–	2.5%	30%	1%	2%
Harris Interactive	1–3 Dec 2015	1,015	–	1%	5%	6%		24%	2%	–	27%			–	4%	28%	1%	2%
Ifop-Fiducial	1–3 Dec 2015	1,105	51%	1%	5%	2%	4%	23%	1%		28%			1%	3.5%	28.5%	1%	2%
Elabe	1–2 Dec 2015	968	50%	1%	5%	6.5%		23%	1%	–	28%			0.5%	3%	28.5%	–	3.5%
Ipsos	29 Nov–2 Dec 2015	8,053	51%	1%	4%	7%		23%	1%	–	28.5%			0.5%	3.5%	29.5%	0.5%	1.5%
Ipsos	20–29 Nov 2015	23,061	52%	1%	4.5%	6%		22%	1%	–	29%			0.5%	3.5%	30%	1%	1.5%
Harris Interactive	24–26 Nov 2015	1,005	–	1%	6%	6%		24%	1%	–	27%			–	5%	28%	1%	1%
Ifop	23–25 Nov 2015	926	54%	1%	3%	5%	4%	22%	2%		28%			1%	3%	28%	1%	2%
Ipsos	21–24 Nov 2015	939	55%	1%	4%	7%		22%	1.5%	–	29%			0.5%	3%	30%	1%	1%
TNS Sofres	20–23 Nov 2015	1,522	–	1.5%	4%	7%		22%	2%	–	27%			0.5%	4%	29%	1%	2%
OpinionWay	18–19 Nov 2015	984	51%	1%	4%	9%		22%	–	–	28%			–	4%	30%	–	2%
Harris Interactive	17–19 Nov 2015	1,011	–	2%	5%	7%		26%	1%	–	25%			–	5%	27%	1%	1%
OpinionWay	13 Nov 2015	–	–	1%	4%	8%		22%	–	–	30%			–	4%	28%	–	3%
Ipsos	30 Oct–2 Nov 2015	936	60%	1.5%	5%	3.5%	3.5%	20%	1%	–	1%	32%		–	4%	26%	–	2.5%
TNS Sofres	13–23 Oct 2015	2,200	–	1%	6%	8%		21%	1%	2%	27%			–	3%	28%	2%	1%
Ifop	12–16 Oct 2015	–	–	–	–	–	–	24%	–	–	31%			–	–	26%	–	–
Elabe	13–14 Oct 2015	972	60%	0.5%	5%	8.5%		23%	1.5%	–	0.5%	30%		–	3%	26%	–	2%
OpinionWay	7–9 Oct 2015	993	55%	2%	5%	3%	3%	23%	–	–	31%			–	2%	28%	–	3%
Odoxa	24–25 Sep 2015	929	–	2%	7%		3%	23%	–	–	35%			–	3%	26%	–	1%
Elabe	22–23 Sep 2015	986	57%	1.5%	6%	8.5%		22.5%	1.5%	–	1.5%	27%		–	3%	26%	–	2.5%
Harris Interactive	29 Mar 2015	4,286	–	1%	7%	7%		20%	–	–	5%	7%	25%	–	2%	22%	–	4%
2010 election	21 Mar 2010	–	53.67%	3.40%	5.84%	–	12.18%	29.13%	3.06%	–	4.20%	–	26.02%	1.24%	–	11.42%	–	3.52%

=== Second round ===
Second round configurations were tested across all regions in France. In two regions, Nord-Pas-de-Calais-Picardie and Provence-Alpes-Côte d'Azur, the left-wing list withdrew after the first round to block the National Front from winning control.

Polling firm	Fieldwork date	Sample size	Abs.	PS-PRG-EELV-PCF-PG	LR-UDI-MoDem	FN
2015 election	13 Dec 2015	–	41.59%	32.12%	40.24%	27.10%
Harris Interactive	6 Dec 2015	1,029	–	34%	35%	31%
Odoxa	6 Dec 2015	2,193	–	34%	35%	31%
Odoxa	6 Dec 2015	2,193	–	–	59%	41%
Ipsos	20–29 Nov 2015	23,061	–	34%	36%	30%
BVA	17–23 Nov 2015	10,842	–	33%	36%	31%
BVA	6–15 Oct 2015	12,408	–	36%	36%	28%
2010 election	14 Mar 2010	–	48.79%	54.06%	36.22%	9.17%

== Alsace-Champagne-Ardenne-Lorraine ==
=== First round ===
Polling firm	Fieldwork date	Sample size	Abs.	Wostyn LO	Peron PCF-PG–MRC	Bélier EELV–PRG	Masseret PS	Richert LR–UDI–MoDem	Jacobelli DLF	Wentzel UPR	Trouillet UL–PM–PL–AEI	Philippot FN
2015 election	6 Dec 2015	–	52.09%	1.48%	3.22%	6.70%	16.11%	25.83%	4.78%	1.08%	4.73%	36.07%
Elabe	26–30 Nov 2015	922	55%	1%	5%	5%	20%	28%	3%	1%	3%	34%
Ipsos	20–29 Nov 2015	2,218	52%	1%	5%	5%	16%	29%	3%	1%	5%	35%
BVA	17–23 Nov 2015	1,203	–	1%	4%	4%	17%	34%	2.5%	1%	3.5%	33%
Odoxa	2–5 Nov 2015	1,001	–	1%	6.5%	6%	19%	30%	2.5%	1%	2%	32%
BVA	6–15 Oct 2015	1,189	–	1%	7%	6%	19%	31%	2.5%	0.5%	3%	30%

=== Second round ===
After Jean-Pierre Masseret refused to withdraw his list in the second round, PS spokeswoman Corinne Narassiguin announced on 7 December that Masseret would "not have the socialist label" in the second round.

Polling firm	Fieldwork date	Sample size	Abs.	Masseret PS	Richert LR–UDI– MoDem	Philippot FN
2015 election	13 Dec 2015	–	40.98%	15.51%	48.40%	36.08%
Elabe	8–10 Dec 2015	920	–	16%	43%	41%
Elabe	26–30 Nov 2015	922	–	30%	34.5%	35.5%
Elabe	26–30 Nov 2015	922	–	–	56%	44%
Ipsos	20–29 Nov 2015	2,218	–	28%	35%	37%
BVA	17–23 Nov 2015	1,203	–	26%	39%	35%
Odoxa	2–5 Nov 2015	1,001	–	28%	37%	35%
BVA	6–15 Oct 2015	1,189	–	30%	37%	33%

== Aquitaine-Limousin-Poitou-Charentes ==
=== First round ===
The October 2015 BVA poll described the list led by Olivier Dartigolles as one of the French Communist Party, and the June 2015 Ifop poll offered the options of an extreme left, Left Front, and National Front lists without naming a list leader, and also described Samuel Morillon as the list leader for Debout la France.

Polling firm	Fieldwork date	Sample size	Abs.	Perchet LO	Dartigolles PCF-PG	Coutant EELV	Rousset PS–PRG	Boussion DVG	Pereira ND	Daniel FD	Camels LR–UDI-MoDem	Setze DLF	Douet UPR	Colombier FN	Others
2015 election	6 Dec 2015	–	49.03%	1.41%	4.85%	5.60%	30.39%	1.85%	1.21%	–	27.19%	3.35%	0.92%	23.23%	–
Ipsos	20–29 Nov 2015	2,098	51%	1%	7%	5%	27%	0.5%	1%	–	29%	2.5%	1%	26%	–
Ifop	20–24 Nov 2015	901	–	0.5%	6.5%	6%	28%	1.5%	2%	–	28%	2%	0.5%	25%	–
BVA	17–23 Nov 2015	1,212	–	1%	7%	6%	26%	0.5%	3%	–	32%	1.5%	1%	22%	–
BVA	6–15 Oct 2015	1,200	–	1%	5%	5%	36%	–	–	1%	30%	2%	–	20%	–
Ifop	5–6 Jun 2015	1,303	–	2%	8%	9%	30%	–	–	–	29%	2%	–	19%	1%

=== Second round ===
Polling firm	Fieldwork date	Sample size	Abs.	Rousset PS–PRG–EELV–PCF-PG	Camels LR–UDI–MoDem	Colombier FN
2015 election	13 Dec 2015	–	42.22%	44.27%	34.06%	21.67%
Ipsos	20–29 Nov 2015	2,098	–	39%	35%	26%
Ifop	20–24 Nov 2015	901	–	39%	35%	26%
BVA	17–23 Nov 2015	1,212	–	39%	37%	24%
BVA	6–15 Oct 2015	1,200	–	46%	33%	21%
Ifop	5–6 Jun 2015	1,303	–	49%	33%	18%

== Auvergne-Rhône-Alpes ==
=== First round ===
The January 2015 Ifop poll did not specify list leaders, only parties, and mentioned an "extreme-left" list without reference to Lutte Ouvrière.

Polling firm	Fieldwork date	Sample size	Abs.	Gomez LO	Cukierman PCF–MRC	Kohlhaas EELV–PG	Queyranne PS–PRG	MoDem	Wauquiez LR–UDI–MoDem	Lafond NC	Rambaud DLF	Fédèle UPR	Boudot FN	Others
2015 election	6 Dec 2015	–	51.09%	1.25%	5.39%	6.90%	23.93%	–	31.73%	1.56%	2.85%	0.87%	25.52%	–
Ifop-Fiducial	1–4 Dec 2015	900	–	1%	5%	7.5%	24%	–	31%	1.5%	2.5%	0.5%	27%	–
Ipsos	20–29 Nov 2015	2,977	54%	1.5%	4.5%	6%	23%	–	32%	1%	2.5%	0.5%	29%	–
Ifop	19–23 Nov 2015	822	54%	1%	4%	9%	25%	–	32%	1%	2%	1%	25%	–
BVA	17–23 Nov 2015	931	–	1%	6%	7%	21%	–	32%	2.5%	3%	0.5%	27%	–
Elabe	18–21 Nov 2015	904	55%	1.5%	3%	7.5%	27%	–	30%	1%	2.5%	1.5%	26%	–
OpinionWay	17–19 Nov 2015	805	53%	1%	6%	6%	25%	–	30%	1%	2%	1%	28%	–
Ifop-Fiducial	27–30 Oct 2015	908	–	1%	4%	10%	26%	–	32%	–	2.5%	0.5%	24%	–
BVA	6–15 Oct 2015	900	–	2%	7%	8.5%	24%	–	35%	–	2%	–	21.5%	–
Ifop-Fiducial	10–15 Sep 2015	903	–	1%	4%	10%	26%	–	35%	–	1.5%	0.5%	22%	–
BVA	28 Aug–1 Sep 2015	823	–	0.5%	3%	15%	23%	7%	30%	–	2.5%	–	19%	–
BVA	28 Aug–1 Sep 2015	823	–	1%	–	17%	25.5%	–	34.5%	–	3%	–	19%	–
Ifop	23–27 Jan 2015	1,008	–	2%	2%	17%	17%	7%	30%	–	–	–	23%	2%

=== Second round ===
Polling firm	Fieldwork date	Sample size	Abs.	Kohlhaas EELV–PG–ND	Queyranne PS–PRG–EELV–PG–PCF–MRC	Wauquiez LR–UDI–MoDem	Boudot FN
2015 election	13 Dec 2015	–	42.32%	–	36.84%	40.62%	22.55%
Ifop	8–10 Dec 2015	1,088	–	–	37%	38%	25%
Ifop-Fiducial	1–4 Dec 2015	900	–	–	35%	36%	29%
Ipsos	20–29 Nov 2015	2,977	–	–	36%	37%	27%
Ifop	19–23 Nov 2015	822	–	–	37%	37%	26%
BVA	17–23 Nov 2015	931	–	–	36%	36%	28%
Elabe	18–21 Nov 2015	904	–	–	37%	37%	26%
OpinionWay	17–19 Nov 2015	805	–	–	36%	37%	27%
Ifop-Fiducial	27–30 Oct 2015	908	–	–	37%	37%	26%
BVA	6–15 Oct 2015	900	–	–	37%	40%	23%
Ifop-Fiducial	10–15 Sep 2015	903	–	–	37%	39%	24%
BVA	28 Aug–1 Sep 2015	823	–	–	38%	40%	22%
BVA	28 Aug–1 Sep 2015	823	–	18%	25%	36%	21%

== Bourgogne-Franche-Comté ==
=== First round ===
The June 2015 Ifop poll was conducted for Alain Joyandet and featured Joyandet leading a list for The Republicans (LR) separate from a Union of Democrats and Independents (UDI) list led by François Sauvadet without naming a Left Front list leader, whereas the June 2015 BVA poll was conducted for Sauvadet and featured a unified LR–UDI list.

Polling firm	Fieldwork date	Sample size	Abs.	Rocher LO	Vermorel PCF-PG–MRC	Prudhomme EELV	Dufay PS–PRG	Gonzalez AEI	Grudler MoDem	Sauvadet UDI-LR	Joyandet LR–UDI	Thiébaut DLF	Gallois UPR	Montel FN
2015 election	6 Dec 2015	–	49.44%	1.51%	4.62%	3.92%	22.99%	2.14%	3.26%	24.00%	–	5.17%	0.92%	31.48%
Ipsos	20–29 Nov 2015	1,084	53%	2%	7.5%	3%	22%	0.5%	4.5%	24%	–	4%	0.5%	32%
Ifop	20–24 Nov 2015	748	50%	1.5%	8.5%	7%	19%	0.5%	3.5%	26%	–	3%	1.5%	30%
BVA	17–23 Nov 2015	797	–	2%	8%	3%	20%	0.5%	5%	27%	–	2%	0.5%	32%
BVA	6–14 Oct 2015	803	–	2%	8%	5%	19%	–	6%	31%	–	3%	0%	26%
Ifop	5–8 Jun 2015	807	–	–	7%	6%	23%	–	4%	10% (UDI)	25% (LR)	2%	–	23%
BVA	3–8 Jun 2015	937	–	–	10%	5%	24%	–	–	34%	–	–	–	25%
BVA	3–8 Jun 2015	937	–	–	10%	5%	24%	–	–	–	33%	–	–	25%

=== Second round ===
The November 2015 Ifop poll considered three scenarios: one in which the Democratic Movement (MoDem) did not secure enough support to be present in the second round, one in which it allied with the left, and one in which it allied with the right.

Polling firm	Fieldwork date	Sample size	Abs.	Dufay PS–PRG–PCF-PG–MRC–EELV	Sauvadet UDI-LR	Joyandet LR–UDI– MoDem	Montel FN
2015 election	13 Dec 2015	–	38.85%	34.67%	32.89%	–	32.44%
Ipsos	20–29 Nov 2015	1,084	–	35%	33%	–	32%
Ifop	20–24 Nov 2015	748	–	35.5%	34.5%	–	30%
Ifop	20–24 Nov 2015	748	–	36% (MoDem)	34%	–	30%
Ifop	20–24 Nov 2015	748	–	35%	36% (MoDem)	–	29%
BVA	17–23 Nov 2015	797	–	30%	35%	–	35%
BVA	6–14 Oct 2015	803	–	34%	36%	–	30%
Ifop	5–8 Jun 2015	807	–	39%	–	40%	21%
BVA	3–8 Jun 2015	937	–	38%	35%	–	27%
BVA	3–8 Jun 2015	937	–	39%	–	34%	27%

== Brittany ==
=== First round ===
The October 2015 BVA poll tested a Left Front list led jointly by Xavier Compain and Sylvie Larue.

Polling firm	Fieldwork date	Sample size	Abs.	RCB	Hamon LO	Roblin NPA	Compain PCF-PG	Louail EELV	Le Drian PS–PRG	Le Fur LR–UDI–MoDem	Foucher DLF	Gourvenec UPR	Pennelle FN	Troadec MBP–UDB	Deléon PB
2015 election	6 Dec 2015	–	48.42%	–	1.37%	0.62%	3.74%	6.70%	34.92%	23.46%	2.90%	0.87%	18.17%	6.71%	0.54%
Ipsos	20–29 Nov 2015	1,418	52%	–	1.5%	1.5%	6%	5%	29%	24%	2%	1%	22%	7%	1%
BVA	17–23 Nov 2015	838	–	–	1%	1.5%	4.5%	6%	29%	29%	1.5%	0.5%	20%	6%	1%
Ifop-Fiducial	13–15 Oct 2015	979	–	–	0.5%	–	6.5%	7.5%	32%	27%	2%	0.5%	16%	8%	–
BVA	6–15 Oct 2015	806	–	2%	1%	1%	4%	7%	26%	30%	2.5%	0.5%	16%	9%	1%

=== Second round ===
Polling firm	Fieldwork date	Sample size	Abs.	Le Drian PS–PRG	Le Fur LR–UDI–MoDem	Pennelle FN
2015 election	13 Dec 2015	–	43.12%	51.41%	29.72%	18.87%
Ipsos	20–29 Nov 2015	1,418	–	45%	33%	22%
BVA	17–23 Nov 2015	838	–	42%	35%	23%
BVA	6–15 Oct 2015	806	–	46%	36%	18%
Ifop-Fiducial	13–15 Oct 2015	979	–	46%	36%	18%

== Centre-Val de Loire ==
=== First round ===
The September 2015 Ifop poll tested three scenarios: one in which Nicolas Sansu and Charles Fournier presented separate lists for the Left Front and Europe Ecology – The Greens, respectively, and two other scenarios in which Sansu and Fournier led a unified list. The May 2015 OpinionWay poll described Marc Brynhole as leader of the Left Front list, and considered separate lists for the Union of Democrats and Independents led by Philippe Vigier and for the Union for a Popular Movement (UMP), later The Republicans, led by Guillaume Peltier.

Polling firm	Fieldwork date	Sample size	Abs.	Megdoud LO	Sansu PCF-PG	Fournier EELV	Bonneau PS–PRG	Le Moine FD	Fesneau MoDem	Vigier UDI–LR–MoDem	Peltier LR	Penloup DLF	Fouquiau UPR	Loiseau FN	Others
2015 election	6 Dec 2015	–	50.46%	1.70%	4.59%	6.60%	24.31%	–	–	26.25%	–	4.58%	1.48%	30.48%	–
Ipsos	20–29 Nov 2015	1,119	53%	1%	8%	4%	22%	–	–	29%	–	3.5%	1.5%	31%	–
BVA	17–23 Nov 2015	794	–	1%	9%	5.5%	20%	–	–	34%	–	3%	0.5%	27%	–
BVA	6–15 Oct 2015	800	–	1%	9%	4%	22%	2%	–	33%	–	4%	1%	24%	–
Ifop	23–25 Sep 2015	720	–	–	9%	7%	22%	–	–	35%	–	4%	–	23%	–
Ifop	23–25 Sep 2015	720	–	–	15% (Sansu)		23%	–	–	35%	–	4%	–	23%	–
Ifop	23–25 Sep 2015	720	–	–	15% (Fournier)		23%	–	–	34%	–	4%	–	24%	–
OpinionWay	12–13 May 2015	963	–	–	8%	5%	22%	–	7%	7% (UDI)	24%	–	–	25%	2%

=== Second round ===
The May 2015 OpinionWay poll tested Guillaume Peltier as the leader of the list of the right in the second round.

Polling firm	Fieldwork date	Sample size	Abs.	Bonneau PS–PRG-EELV	Vigier UDI–LR–MoDem	Loiseau FN
2015 election	13 Dec 2015	–	40.78%	35.42%	34.58%	30.00%
Ipsos	20–29 Nov 2015	1,119	–	34%	36%	30%
BVA	17–23 Nov 2015	794	–	30%	39%	31%
BVA	6–15 Oct 2015	800	–	33%	40%	27%
Ifop	23–25 Sep 2015	720	–	36%	40%	24%
OpinionWay	12–13 May 2015	963	–	35%	38%	27%
OpinionWay	12–13 May 2015	963	–	43%	57%	–

== Corsica ==
=== First round ===
Polling firm	Fieldwork date	Sample size	Abs.	Bucchini PCF-PG	De Gentili PS	Orsucci CSD	Giacobbi DVG	Zuccarelli PRG	Talamoni CL	Benedetti Rinnovu	Simeoni FC	Rossi LR–UDI-CCB	De Rocca Serra LR	Santoni DLF	Canioni FN
2015 election	6 Dec 2015	–	40.34%	5.56%	3.25%	4.13%	18.42%	3.15%	7.73%	2.58%	17.62%	13.17%	12.70%	1.12%	10.58%
OpinionWay	24–28 Nov 2015	801	40%	7%	4%	4%	13%	4%	8%	1%	19%	14%	14%	1%	11%
OpinionWay	27–30 Oct 2015	805	43%	7%	4%	4%	12%	5%	8%	1%	18%	12%	16%	1%	12%

== Île-de-France ==
=== First round ===
The October 2015 BVA poll tested both a French Communist Party list led by Pierre Laurent and a Left Party list led by Éric Coquerel. The BVA poll conducted from 22 to 24 September 2015 was conducted for the Socialist Party (PS), while the BVA survey fielded between 1 and 3 September 2015 was commissioned by Europe Ecology – The Greens (EELV). The June 2015 Ifop poll tested a list led by Chantal Jouanno for the Union of Democrats and Independents (UDI) and specified an "extreme-left" list without naming a party or leader. The April 2015 Harris Interactive poll was conducted for the PS, and tested a joint Lutte Ouvrière and New Anticapitalist Party list led by Olivier Besancenot. The Ifop poll conducted from 31 March to 4 April 2015 tested two sets of scenarios: two with a divided right and centre, and the other two with the right and centre united behind Valérie Pécresse; it also tested only an "extreme-left" list without specifying a party or leader. The November 2014 Ifop poll did not specify "extreme-left", Left Front, or National Front list leaders, and proposed a joint list between the Democratic Movement (MoDem) and the UDI led by Jean-Christophe Lagarde as well as a unified list with Pécresse.

Polling firm	Fieldwork date	Sample size	Abs.	Arthaud LO	Laurent PCF-PG	Coquerel PG	Cosse EELV–Cap21	Bartolone PS–PRG	Huchon PS–PRG	De la Gontrie PS–PRG	Pereira FD	Wehrling MoDem	Jouanno UDI	Pécresse LR–UDI–MoDem	Sachs NC	Véron PLD	Dupont-Aignan DLF	Asselineau UPR	De Saint-Just FN	Horsfall UC	De Smet FLUO	Bourchada UDMF	Others
2015 election	6 Dec 2015	–	54.10%	1.40%	6.63%	–	8.03%	25.19%	–	–	–	–	–	30.51%	0.63%	0.76%	6.57%	0.94%	18.41%	0.23%	0.30%	0.40%	–
Ipsos	20–29 Nov 2015	4,055	55%	1%	8%	–	6%	23%	–	–	–	–	–	32%	1%	0.5%	5.5%	0.5%	21%	0.5%	0.5%	0.5%	–
Ifop	24–26 Nov 2015	898	–	1%	7%	–	7.5%	23%	–	–	–	–	–	33%	0.5%	0.5%	5.5%	1%	21%	<0.5%	<0.5%	<0.5%	–
Elabe	20–25 Nov 2015	913	55%	1%	7.5%	–	7.5%	23%	–	–	–	–	–	30%	1%	0.5%	6%	0.5%	21%	0.5%	1%	0.5%	–
BVA	17–23 Nov 2015	800	–	0.5%	7%	–	7%	23%	–	–	–	–	–	33%	0.5%	<0.5%	5%	0.5%	22%	0.5%	0.5%	0.5%	–
Ipsos	19–21 Nov 2015	815	59%	1%	7.5%	–	6%	22%	–	–	–	–	–	33%	1%	0.5%	5%	1.5%	22%	0.5%	<0.5%	<0.5%	–
Odoxa	19–21 Nov 2015	1,000	–	2%	8%	–	6%	23%	–	–	–	–	–	33%	–	–	4%	–	23%	–	–	–	1%
Ipsos	10–13 Nov 2015	1,000	60%	1%	8.5%	–	7%	21%	–	–	–	–	–	34%	1%	0.5%	5%	1%	20%	0.5%	0.5%	<0.5%	–
Ifop-Fiducial	3–6 Nov 2015	902	–	1.5%	7.5%	–	9%	25%	–	–	–	–	–	32%	–	–	6%	0.5%	18.5%	–	–	–	–
OpinionWay	3–6 Nov 2015	801	55%	2%	7%	–	7%	22%	–	–	–	–	–	35%	–	<1%	5%	1%	21%	–	–	<1%	–
BVA	6–15 Oct 2015	802	–	1%	2%	5%	8%	23%	–	–	1%	–	–	35%	–	<0.5%	8%	–	17%	–	–	–	–
Odoxa	29 Sep–2 Oct 2015	1,000	–	1%	8%	–	6%	24%	–	–	–	–	–	34%	–	–	7%	–	20%	–	–	–	–
Ifop	23–25 Sep 2015	903	–	1%	9.5%	–	7.5%	24%	–	–	–	–	–	32%	–	–	7%	1%	18%	–	–	–	–
BVA	22–24 Sep 2015	901	–	2%	7%	–	9%	25%	–	–	–	–	–	31%	–	–	8%	–	18%	–	–	–	–
BVA	1–3 Sep 2015	878	–	2%	8%	–	10%	24%	–	–	–	–	–	33%	–	–	8%	–	15%	–	–	–	–
Ifop	3–5 Jun 2015	900	–	2%	7%	–	10%	24%	–	–	–	–	8%	28%	–	–	5%	–	16%	–	–	–	–
Harris Interactive	10–14 Apr 2015	900	–	2%	6%	–	8%	–	21%	–	–	5%	10%	25%	–	–	4%	–	19%	–	–	–	–
Harris Interactive	10–14 Apr 2015	900	–	2%	7%	–	9%	–	–	18%	–	6%	10%	25%	–	–	6%	–	17%	–	–	–	–
Ifop-Fiducial	31 Mar–4 Apr 2015	930	–	2%	8%	–	8%	–	22%	–	–	5%	6%	26%	–	–	5%	–	18%	–	–	–	–
Ifop-Fiducial	31 Mar–4 Apr 2015	930	–	2%	10%	–	8%	–	–	20%	–	5%	6%	26%	–	–	5%	–	18%	–	–	–	–
Ifop-Fiducial	31 Mar–4 Apr 2015	930	–	2%	8%	–	9%	–	23%	–	–	–	–	33%	–	–	6%	–	19%	–	–	–	–
Ifop-Fiducial	31 Mar–4 Apr 2015	930	–	2%	9%	–	9%	–	–	22%	–	–	–	33%	–	–	6%	–	19%	–	–	–	–
Ifop	30 Jan–2 Feb 2015	911	–	–	–	–	9%	–	21%	–	–	–	12%	23%	–	–	6%	–	19%	–	–	–	–
Ifop	30 Jan–2 Feb 2015	911	–	–	–	–	10%	–	–	20%	–	–	12%	23%	–	–	6%	–	19%	–	–	–	–
Ifop	21–26 Nov 2014	1,710	–	1.5%	7.5%	–	11%	–	21%	–	–	12% (Lagarde)		23%	–	–	6%	–	18%	–	–	–	–
Ifop	21–26 Nov 2014	1,710	–	2%	7.5%	–	13%	–	22%	–	–	–	–	30%	–	–	6.5%	–	19%	–	–	–	–

=== Second round ===
Polling firm	Fieldwork date	Sample size	Abs.	Bartolone PS–PRG–EELV–PCF-PG	Huchon PS–PRG–EELV-PCF-PG	De La Gontrie PS–PRG–EELV–PCF-PG	Pécresse LR–UDI– MoDem	De Saint-Just FN
2015 election	13 Dec 2015	–	45.54%	42.18%	–	–	43.80%	14.02%
Ifop-Fiducial	8–10 Dec 2015	1,055	–	40%	–	–	42%	18%
Elabe	7–9 Dec 2015	905	–	41.5%	–	–	41%	17.5%
Odoxa	6–7 Dec 2015	1,200	–	40%	–	–	42%	18%
Ipsos	20–29 Nov 2015	4,055	–	38%	–	–	40%	22%
Ifop	24–26 Nov 2015	898	–	37%	–	–	39%	24%
Elabe	20–25 Nov 2015	913	–	37%	–	–	39%	24%
BVA	17–23 Nov 2015	800	–	36%	–	–	41%	23%
Ipsos	19–21 Nov 2015	815	–	36%	–	–	40%	24%
Odoxa	19–21 Nov 2015	1,000	–	35%	–	–	40%	25%
Ipsos	10–13 Nov 2015	1,000	–	37%	–	–	41%	22%
Ifop-Fiducial	3–6 Nov 2015	902	–	38%	–	–	39%	23%
OpinionWay	3–6 Nov 2015	801	–	35%	–	–	42%	23%
BVA	6–15 Oct 2015	802	–	39%	–	–	41%	20%
Odoxa	29 Sep–2 Oct 2015	1,000	–	38%	–	–	41%	21%
Ifop	23–25 Sep 2015	903	–	39%	–	–	40%	21%
BVA	22–24 Sep 2015	901	–	41%	–	–	39%	20%
BVA	1–3 Sep 2015	878	–	41%	–	–	41%	18%
Ifop	3–5 Jun 2015	900	–	41%	–	–	41%	18%
Ifop-Fiducial	31 Mar–4 Apr 2015	930	–	–	39%	–	41%	20%
Ifop-Fiducial	31 Mar–4 Apr 2015	930	–	–	–	39%	41%	20%
Ifop	21–26 Nov 2014	1,710	–	–	38%	–	41%	21%

== Languedoc-Roussillon-Midi-Pyrénées ==
=== First round ===
The December and September 2015 OpinionWay polls were conducted for Europe Ecology – The Greens (EELV). The July 2015 PollingVox survey proposed a list of Europe Ecology – The Greens and the Left Party led by Gérard Onesta, a list of the Socialist Party and French Communist Party led by Carole Delga, a miscellaneous left list led by Philippe Saurel supported by the Radical Party of the Left, and a list led by Louis Aliot under the banner of the Rassemblement bleu Marine. The Ifop poll conducted from 30 June to 2 July 2015 proposed separate lists for the Left Front led by Guilhem Sérieys and for the EELV led by Onesta.

Polling firm	Fieldwork date	Sample size	Abs.	Torremocha LO	Sérieys PCF-PG	Onesta EELV–PCF-PG–POC	Delga PS–PRG–MRC	Saurel DVG	Fabre ND	Cavard UDE–Cap21	Canzian AEI–CDC	Rochefort MoDem	Reynié LR–UDI–MoDem	Lempereur DLF	Hirimiris UPR	Aliot FN	Martinez FFS
2015 election	6 Dec 2015	–	47.73%	1.81%	–	10.26%	24.41%	5.00%	0.83%	1.70%	–	–	18.84%	3.91%	0.71%	31.83%	0.69%
OpinionWay	1–2 Dec 2015	1,029	–	<1%	–	13%	20%	5%	2%	<1%	–	–	22%	4%	1%	32%	1%
Ifop	28 Nov–1 Dec 2015	905	–	1%	–	9.5%	20%	6%	1.5%	2.5%	–	–	23.5%	3.5%	1%	31%	0.5%
Ipsos	20–29 Nov 2015	2,079	50%	1%	–	11%	23%	4%	2%	0.5%	–	–	20%	3.5%	0.5%	34%	0.5%
BVA	17–23 Nov 2015	1,015	–	0.5%	–	14%	19%	6%	1%	2%	–	–	22%	3%	0.5%	32%	<0.5%
Ipsos	19–21 Nov 2015	810	53%	1%	–	11%	23%	5%	2%	0.5%	–	–	21%	3.5%	0.5%	32%	0.5%
Ifop-Fiducial	10–13 Nov 2015	899	–	0.5%	–	12%	21%	6%	1.5%	2.5%	0.5%	–	22.5%	2.5%	1%	29%	1%
Ipsos	10–13 Nov 2015	1,001	52%	2%	–	10%	24%	5%	1.5%	0.5%	–	–	21%	3.5%	1%	31%	0.5%
BVA	6–15 Oct 2015	1,000	–	1%	–	11%	19%	6%	3%	3%	–	5%	20%	2%	1%	29%	–
Ifop	8–12 Oct 2015	923	–	0.5%	–	11%	20%	8%	2%	2.5%	–	–	25%	2%	1%	28%	<0.5%
Ifop	10–14 Sep 2015	916	–	–	–	16%	21%	7%	–	–	–	–	26%	3%	–	27%	–
OpinionWay	3–8 Sep 2015	1,090	46%	–	–	16%	22%	8%	–	–	–	–	24%	3%	–	27%	–
PollingVox	3–5 Jul 2015	818	–	–	–	14%	19%	11%	–	–	–	–	25%	4%	–	27%	–
Ifop	30 Jun–2 Jul 2015	917	–	–	9%	7%	22%	9%	–	–	–	–	23%	2%	–	27%	1%

=== Second round ===
Polling firm	Fieldwork date	Sample size	Abs.	Onesta EELV–PCF-PG–POC–PS–PRG–MRC	Delga PS–PRG–MRC–EELV–PCF-PG–POC	Saurel DVG	Reynié LR–UDI–MoDem	Aliot FN
2015 election	13 Dec 2015	–	37.98%	–	44.81%	–	21.32%	33.87%
Ifop	8–10 Dec 2015	1,086	–	–	43%	–	22%	35%
OpinionWay	1–2 Dec 2015	1,029	–	–	38%	–	29%	33%
OpinionWay	1–2 Dec 2015	1,029	–	37%	–	–	30%	33%
Ifop	28 Nov–1 Dec 2015	905	–	–	37%	–	29%	34%
Ipsos	20–29 Nov 2015	2,079	–	–	40%	–	26%	34%
BVA	17–23 Nov 2015	1,015	–	–	39%	–	26%	35%
Ipsos	19–21 Nov 2015	810	–	–	40%	–	27%	33%
Ifop-Fiducial	10–13 Nov 2015	899	–	–	40%	–	29%	31%
Ipsos	10–13 Nov 2015	1,001	–	–	41%	–	28%	31%
BVA	6–15 Oct 2015	1,000	–	–	39%	–	29%	32%
Ifop	8–12 Oct 2015	923	–	–	38%	–	32%	30%
Ifop	10–14 Sep 2015	916	–	–	39%	–	32%	29%
OpinionWay	3–8 Sep 2015	1,090	45%	–	42%	–	30%	28%
OpinionWay	3–8 Sep 2015	1,090	45%	41%	–	–	31%	28%
PollingVox	3–5 Jul 2015	818	–	–	36%	–	32%	32%
Ifop	30 Jun–2 Jul 2015	917	–	–	39%	–	32%	29%
Ifop	30 Jun–2 Jul 2015	917	–	–	31%	11%	29%	29%

== Nord-Pas-de-Calais-Picardie ==
=== First round ===
The October 2015 Harris Interactive poll was conducted for the French Communist Party (PCF), and the October 2015 BVA poll did not specify a list leader for Nous Citoyens. The September 2015 Odoxa poll offered an "extreme-left" list without noting a party or leader, and in one scenario proposed a common list of the Left Front and Europe Ecology – The Greens (EELV) led by Fabien Roussel and Sandrine Rousseau. The September 2015 Ifop poll offered three scenarios: one in which the Left Front was divided between Roussel (supported by the PCF) and Rousseau (supported by EELV, the Left Party, and New Deal), one in which the parties of the Left Front united behind Roussel while Rousseau ran only an EELV list, and one in which the Left Front and EELV joined a single list conducted by Pierre de Saintignon of the Socialist Party (PS). The September 2015 Odoxa poll and June 2015 OpinionWay and Ifop polls each described separate Left Front and EELV lists; the first did not specify the party or leader of an "extreme-left" list, and also proposed a scenario with a united PS–EELV list led by Saintignon. The June 2015 Ifop poll, which was conducted for EELV, did not specify an "extreme-left" list leader or party, and neither did it specify a list leader for the Left Front when not in alliance, in which case Sandrine Rousseau conducted the list. It also tested two unified PS–EELV list scenarios: one in which the list was led by Saintignon, and the other by Rousseau.

Polling firm	Fieldwork date	Sample size	Abs.	Pecqueur LO	Roussel PCF	Rousseau EELV–PG–ND	De Saintignon PS–PRG–MRC	Vanlerenberghe MoDem	Bertrand LR–UDI–MoDem–CPNT	Blondel NC	Tanguy DLF	Mascaro UPR	Le Pen FN	Gernigon PFE	Others
2015 election	6 Dec 2015	–	45.19%	1.75%	5.32%	4.83%	18.12%	–	24.97%	1.36%	2.39%	0.64%	40.64%	–	–
Ipsos	20–29 Nov 2015	2,494	49%	1.5%	3.5%	6%	20%	–	25%	1.5%	2%	0.5%	40%	–	–
Ifop-Fiducial	25–28 Nov 2015	941	–	1.5%	5.5%	6.5%	20%	–	24%	1%	2%	0.5%	39%	–	–
BVA	17–23 Nov 2015	902	–	2.5%	5%	6%	17%	–	24%	1%	2%	0.5%	42%	–	–
Ipsos	19–21 Nov 2015	802	53%	2%	3.5%	5%	20%	–	26%	1%	2%	0.5%	40%	–	–
OpinionWay	17–20 Nov 2015	807	46%	1%	6%	5%	20%	–	26%	<1%	2%	<1%	40%	–	–
Ifop	10–13 Nov 2015	968	–	1.5%	5.5%	8%	19%	–	26%	1%	2%	0.5%	36.5%	–	–
Ipsos	10–13 Nov 2015	992	55%	1%	5%	6%	20%	–	24%	2%	3%	<0.5%	40%	–	–
Ifop	20–23 Oct 2015	978	–	1%	4%	9%	19%	–	26%	1.5%	1.5%	<0.5%	38%	<0.5%	–
Harris Interactive	14–19 Oct 2015	1,022	–	2%	9%	8%	16%	–	25%	–	2%	–	35%	–	–
BVA	6–14 Oct 2015	903	–	1%	5%	8%	15%	–	25%	2%	2%	–	42%	–	–
Odoxa	15–18 Sep 2015	991	–	4%	6%	4%	19%	–	26%	–	2%	–	36%	–	3%
Odoxa	15–18 Sep 2015	991	–	4%	9%		21%	–	26%	–	1%	–	37%	–	2%
Ifop	9–14 Sep 2015	924	–	2%	5%	10%	18%	–	28%	–	2.5%	–	34%	0.5%	–
Ifop	9–14 Sep 2015	924	–	2%	9% (FG)	5% (EELV)	17%	–	28%	–	3%	–	35%	1%	–
Ifop	9–14 Sep 2015	924	–	3%	28% (PS–PRG–FG–EELV)			–	30%	–	3%	–	35%	1%	–
OpinionWay	25–29 Jun 2015	825	–	4%	5%	8%	18%	–	26%	–	1%	–	32%	–	6%
OpinionWay	25–29 Jun 2015	825	–	5%	6%	23% (PS–EELV)		–	26%	–	1%	–	33%	–	6%
Ifop	4–8 Jun 2015	876	–	2%	7% (FG)	7% (EELV)	18%	5%	28%	–	2%	–	31%	–	–
Ifop	4–8 Jun 2015	876	–	3%	14% (EELV–FG)		17%	5%	28%	–	2%	–	31%	–	–
Ifop	4–8 Jun 2015	876	–	2%	7% (FG)	23% (PS–PRG–EELV)		5%	28%	–	3%	–	32%	–	–
Ifop	4–8 Jun 2015	876	–	2%	7% (FG)	23% (EELV–PS–PRG)		6%	28%	–	2%	–	32%	–	–

=== Second round ===
The November 2015 BVA poll tested two duels, the second of which specified a scenario in which the PS supported the list of the right.

Polling firm	Fieldwork date	Sample size	Abs.	De Saintignon PS–PRG–MRC-EELV–PCF-PG	Bertrand LR–UDI–MoDem–CPNT	Marine Le Pen FN
2015 election	13 Dec 2015	–	38.76%	–	57.77%	42.23%
BVA	9–10 Dec 2015	908	–	–	53%	47%
Ifop-Fiducial	8–10 Dec 2015	1,091	–	–	54%	46%
TNS Sofres	7–8 Dec 2015	805	–	–	53%	47%
Odoxa	6–8 Dec 2015	1,274	–	–	52%	48%
Ipsos	20–29 Nov 2015	2,494	–	30%	30%	40%
Ifop-Fiducial	25–28 Nov 2015	941	–	–	50.5%	49.5%
Ifop-Fiducial	25–28 Nov 2015	941	–	30%	28%	42%
Ifop-Fiducial	25–28 Nov 2015	941	–	48%	–	52%
BVA	17–23 Nov 2015	902	–	–	48%	52%
BVA	17–23 Nov 2015	902	–	–	49% (PS)	51%
BVA	17–23 Nov 2015	902	–	26%	30%	44%
Ipsos	19–21 Nov 2015	802	–	29%	30%	41%
OpinionWay	17–20 Nov 2015	807	–	–	50%	50%
OpinionWay	17–20 Nov 2015	807	–	27%	30%	43%
OpinionWay	17–20 Nov 2015	807	–	46%	–	54%
Ifop	10–13 Nov 2015	968	–	–	53%	47%
Ifop	10–13 Nov 2015	968	–	31%	31%	38%
Ipsos	10–13 Nov 2015	992	–	30%	29%	41%
Ifop	20–23 Oct 2015	978	–	30%	31%	39%
Harris Interactive	14–19 Oct 2015	1,022	–	32%	31%	37%
BVA	6–14 Oct 2015	903	–	–	48%	52%
BVA	6–14 Oct 2015	903	–	25%	29%	46%
Odoxa	15–18 Sep 2015	991	–	29%	32%	39%
Ifop	9–14 Sep 2015	924	–	32%	33%	35%
OpinionWay	25–29 Jun 2015	825	–	31%	32%	37%

== Normandy ==
=== First round ===
The February 2015 OpinionWay poll was commissioned by Debout la France, and did not specify a list leader for the Left Front or an "extreme-left" list (for which no party was specified).

Polling firm	Fieldwork date	Sample size	Abs.	Le Manach LO	Jumel PCF-PG	Soubien EELV	Mayer-Rossignol PS–PRG	Lecoeur ND	Morin UDI–LR–MoDem	Calbrix DLF	Loutre UPR	Bay FN	Others
2015 election	6 Dec 2015	–	50.05%	1.83%	7.04%	6.14%	23.52%	0.78%	27.91%	4.14%	0.93%	27.71%	–
Ifop	2–3 Dec 2015	788	–	–	7.5%	6.5%	19%	–	31%	–	–	29%	–
Odoxa	27–30 Nov 2015	980	–	1%	7%	5%	23%	2%	28%	2%	2%	30%	–
Ipsos	20–29 Nov 2015	1,222	52%	0.5%	7%	5%	20.5%	2%	31%	2.5%	0.5%	31%	–
BVA	17–23 Nov 2015	810	–	1%	9%	5%	21%	1%	31%	2%	<0.5%	30%	–
BVA	6–14 Oct 2015	800	–	1%	9%	7%	23%	–	32%	1%	0%	27%	–
OpinionWay	Feb 2015	1,005	–	2%	6%	9%	22%	–	29%	5%	–	22%	5%

=== Second round ===
Polling firm	Fieldwork date	Sample size	Abs.	Mayer-Rossignol PS–PRG–EELV-PCF-PG	Morin UDI–LR–MoDem	Bay FN
2015 election	13 Dec 2015	–	40.92%	36.08%	36.42%	27.50%
Ifop	2–3 Dec 2015	788	–	34%	37%	29%
BVA	8–10 Dec 2015	776	–	36%	36%	28%
Odoxa	27–30 Nov 2015	980	–	35%	34%	31%
Ipsos	20–29 Nov 2015	1,222	–	34%	35%	31%
BVA	17–23 Nov 2015	810	–	34%	33%	33%
BVA	6–14 Oct 2015	800	–	34%	36%	30%

== Pays de la Loire ==
=== First round ===
Polling firm	Fieldwork date	Sample size	Abs.	Le Beller LO	Terrien EXG	Pagano PCF–MRC	Bringuy EELV	Clergeau PS–PRG	Le Gal La Salle MEI	Retailleau LR–UDI–MoDem	Bayle DLF	Parisot UPR	Gannat FN	Denigot UDB–MBP
2015 election	6 Dec 2015	–	50.03%	1.47%	0.17%	3.33%	7.82%	25.75%	–	33.49%	4.09%	1.26%	21.35%	1.27%
Ipsos	20–29 Nov 2015	1,642	55%	1.5%	0.5%	2%	6%	27%	–	32%	4%	1%	25%	1.5%
BVA	17–23 Nov 2015	795	–	0.5%	0.5%	4%	6%	24%	–	38%	1.5%	<0.5%	23%	2.5%
BVA	6–15 Oct 2015	800	–	1%	–	6%	7%	23%	5%	36%	2%	–	16%	4%

=== Second round ===
Polling firm	Fieldwork date	Sample size	Abs.	Clergeau PS–PRG-EELV–PCF–MRC	Retailleau LR–UDI–MoDem	Gannat FN
2015 election	13 Dec 2015	–	42.75%	37.56%	42.70%	19.74%
Ipsos	20–29 Nov 2015	1,642	–	37%	39%	24%
BVA	17–23 Nov 2015	795	–	34%	42%	24%
BVA	6–15 Oct 2015	800	–	37%	45%	18%

== Provence-Alpes-Côte d'Azur ==
=== First round ===
The October 2015 BVA poll also named Jean-Marc Coppola as a list leader for the joint Europe Ecology – The Greens (EELV) and Left Front list alongside Sophie Camard, while the June 2015 proposed two separate lists, a Left Front list led by Coppola and an EELV list led by Camard, without naming list leaders for "extreme-left", Democratic Movement (MoDem), or Debout la France lists.

Polling firm	Fieldwork date	Sample size	Abs.	Bonnet LO	Coppola PCF-PG	Camard EELV–PCF-PG	Castaner PS–PRG–MRC	Jarny ND	Governatori AEI	MoDem	Estrosi LR–UDI–MoDem	Chuisano DLF	Romani UPR	Maréchal-Le Pen FN	Bompard LS
2015 election	6 Dec 2015	–	48.06%	1.48%	–	6.54%	16.59%	0.64%	4.05%	–	26.47%	1.95%	0.61%	40.55%	1.12%
Ipsos	20–29 Nov 2015	1,733	49%	1%	–	7.5%	16%	1%	1.5%	–	30%	2%	0.5%	40%	0.5%
Ifop	25–27 Nov 2015	907	–	0.5%	–	8%	18%	2%	1.5%	–	29%	1.5%	<0.5%	39%	0.5%
BVA	17–23 Nov 2015	808	–	1%	–	8%	16%	0.5%	2%	–	28%	1%	0.5%	42%	1%
Ipsos	19–21 Nov 2015	830	51%	1%	–	8%	16%	1%	1%	–	30%	2%	0.5%	40%	0.5%
Ifop-Fiducial	17–20 Nov 2015	919	–	0.5%	–	8.5%	19%	2%	1%	–	30%	1.5%	<0.5%	37%	0.5%
Ipsos	10–13 Nov 2015	1,000	54%	1%	–	8%	16%	1%	2%	–	32%	2%	0.5%	37%	0.5%
OpinionWay	10–12 Nov 2015	833	52%	1%	–	8%	18%	1%	2%	–	31%	2%	<1%	37%	<1%
Ifop	13–17 Oct 2015	915	–	0.5%	–	11.5%	18%	1.5%	–	–	32%	1.5%	<0.5%	34%	1%
Odoxa	12–16 Oct 2015	927	–	1.5%	–	10%	18%	2%	–	–	30%	2%	0.5%	35%	1%
BVA	6–15 Oct 2015	798	–	1%	10%		16%	2%	–	–	32%	2%	–	36%	1%
Ifop-Fiducial	23–26 Jun 2015	905	–	1%	7%	7% (EELV)	17%	–	–	5%	29%	2%	–	32%	–

=== Second round ===
Polling firm	Fieldwork date	Sample size	Abs.	Castaner PS–PRG–MRC–EELV–PCF-PG	Estrosi LR–UDI–MoDem	Maréchal-Le Pen FN
2015 election	13 Dec 2015	–	39.69%	–	54.78%	45.22%
BVA	8–10 Dec 2015	828	–	–	51%	49%
Ifop-Fiducial	8–9 Dec 2015	1,089	–	–	52%	48%
Harris Interactive	7–9 Dec 2015	1,000	–	–	51%	49%
TNS Sofres	7–8 Dec 2015	803	–	–	54%	46%
Odoxa	6–8 Dec 2015	1,299	–	–	52%	48%
Ipsos	20–29 Nov 2015	1,733	–	25%	34%	41%
Ifop	25–27 Nov 2015	907	–	27%	34%	39%
BVA	17–23 Nov 2015	808	–	–	50%	50%
BVA	17–23 Nov 2015	808	–	25%	32%	43%
Ipsos	19–21 Nov 2015	830	–	25%	34%	41%
Ifop-Fiducial	17–20 Nov 2015	919	–	29%	33%	38%
Ipsos	10–13 Nov 2015	1,000	–	26%	36%	38%
OpinionWay	10–12 Nov 2015	833	–	–	52%	48%
OpinionWay	10–12 Nov 2015	833	–	27%	35%	38%
OpinionWay	10–12 Nov 2015	833	–	43%	–	57%
Ifop	13–17 Oct 2015	915	–	28%	36%	36%
Odoxa	12–16 Oct 2015	927	–	29%	34%	37%
BVA	6–15 Oct 2015	798	–	27%	36%	37%
Ifop-Fiducial	23–26 Jun 2015	905	–	32%	35%	33%

== Guadeloupe ==
=== First round ===
Polling firm	Fieldwork date	Sample size	Abs.	Nomertin CO	Plaisir CIPPA	Cadoce PCG	Lurel PS	Chalus GUSR	Bernier LR–UDI–MoDem	Seymour AG	Yoyotte Nofrap	Viennet FN	Myre-Quidal UPLG
2015 election	6 Dec 2015	–	52.79%	1.42%	1.85%	0.92%	41.09%	43.55%	4.49%	3.18%	1.58%	1.40%	0.50%
Qualistat	21–28 Oct 2015	565	–	3%	3%	2%	41%	43%	6%	1%	–	–	1%

== French Guiana ==
=== First round ===
Polling firm	Fieldwork date	Sample size	Abs.	Létard Walwari–EELV	Taubira PPG	Tien-Liong MDES	Fabien Canavy MDES	Chantal Berthelot PSG	Rodolphe Alexandre GR	Rémy-Louis Budoc LR	Muriel Icaré Nourel UG	Sylvio Létard DIG
2015 election	6 Dec 2015	–	57.38%	7.10%	0.97%	30.24%	5.71%	8.49%	42.34%	3.08%	1.59%	0.48%
Qualistat	16–28 Nov 2015	504	–	6%	4%	23%	7%	13%	43%	2%	2%	1%

== Réunion ==
=== First round ===
Hugues Maillot was tested as list leader for Debout la France in the September 2015 Ipsos poll.

Polling firm	Fieldwork date	Sample size	Abs.	Payet LO	Bello PLR–PS–EELV	Lebreton PS–PCR	Ratenon ARCP	Robert MoDem	Robert LR–UDI–OR	Victoria LR	Morel DLF	Appadoo UPR	Grondin FN	Boyer NR	Payet Demorun	Allamèle DIV	Mouen MCP
2015 election	6 Dec 2015	–	55.55%	0.48%	23.80%	7.12%	1.69%	20.32%	40.36%	1.02%	0.37%	0.48%	2.39%	0.52%	1.47%	–	–
Abaksys	23–28 Nov 2015	1,257	–	0.1%	32.5%	9.8%	1.9%	17.9%	35.0%	0.6%	0.3%	0.0%	1.0%	0.2%	0.5%	–	–
Abaksys	15–22 Oct 2015	1,177	–	0.0%	31.5%	8.3%	0.7%	17.9%	38.9%	1.1%	0.2%	0.0%	0.2%	0.7%	0.0%	0.4%	0.0%
Ipsos	8–15 Sep 2015	502	–	1%	34.5%	8%	1%	15%	38%	–	2%	–	2.5%	1%	1%	–	–

=== Second round ===
Polling firm	Fieldwork date	Sample size	Abs.	Bello PLR–PS–EELV–MoDem–PCR	Robert LR–UDI–OR
2015 election	13 Dec 2015	–	44.72%	47.31%	52.69%
Ipsos	8–10 Dec 2015	618	–	46.5%	53.5%
