= Juliana Rimane =

French politician (born 1959)

Member of the National Assembly for French Guiana's 2nd constituency
- In office 19 July 2002 – 19 June 2007
- Preceded by: Léon Bertrand
- Succeeded by: Chantal Berthelot
- Parliamentary group: UMP

Personal details
- Born: 22 January 1959 (age 67) Kourou, French Guiana
- Education: Paris-Est Créteil University; University of the Antilles and French Guiana
- Profession: Librarian

Juliana Rimane (born 22 January 1959 in Kourou, French Guiana) is a politician from French Guiana who was elected to the French National Assembly in 2002.
