= Davy Rimane =

French politician and labor activist

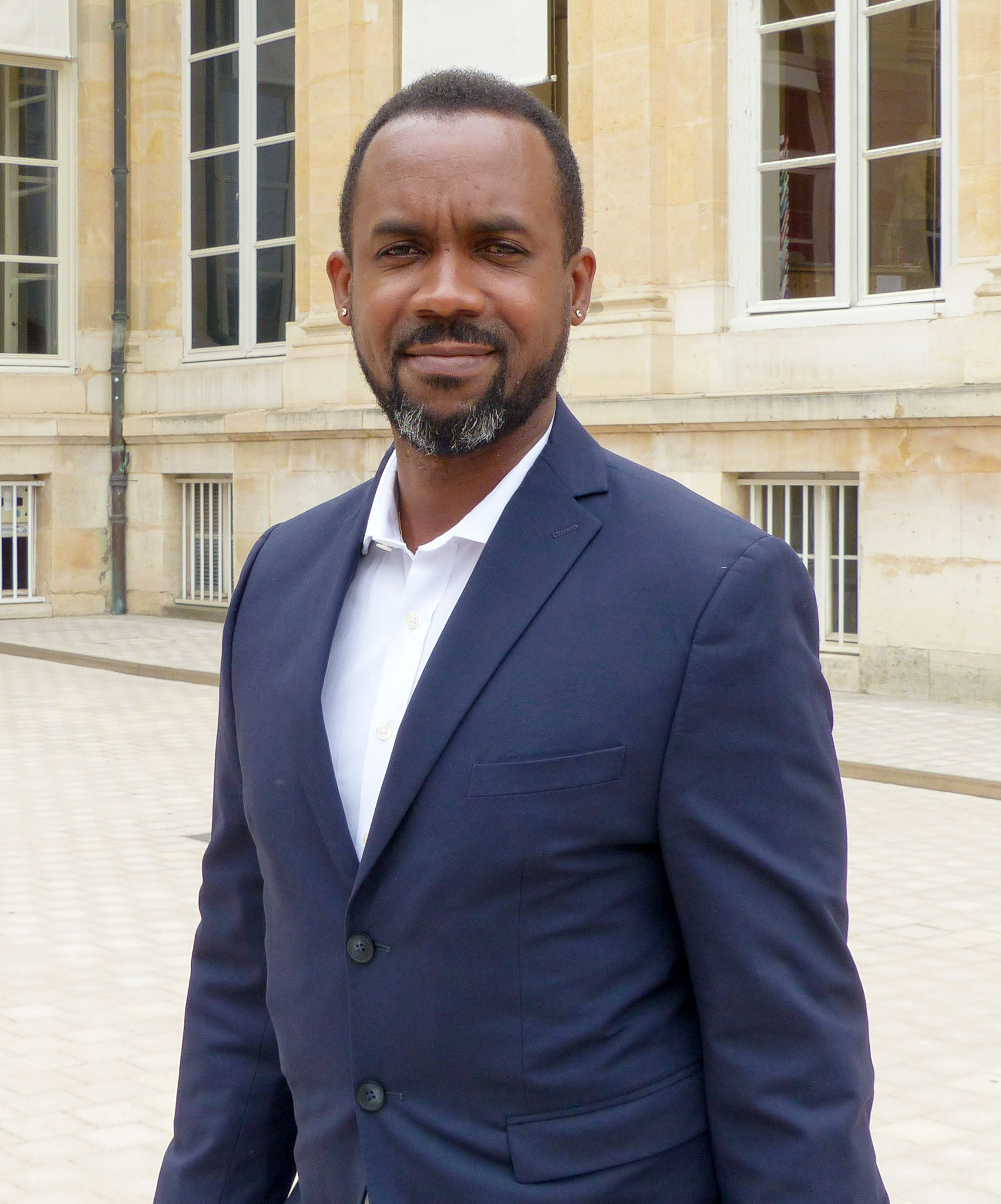

Member of the National Assembly for Guyane's 2nd constituency
- Incumbent
- Assumed office 22 June 2022
- Preceded by: Lénaïck Adam

Personal details
- Born: 15 December 1979 (age 46) Kourou, French Guiana
- Party: La France Insoumise

Davy Rimane (born 15 December 1979) is a French politician and labor activist. Rimane was elected to represent French Guiana's 2nd constituency in the 2022 French legislative election. He had previously contested the seat in the 2017 legislation election as well as the 2018 by-election.

== Early life and education ==
Rimane was born in Kourou in 1979, the same year Ariane 1 held its maiden flight at the Guiana Space Centre located within the town. He is the grand-nephew of Eustaste Rimane, who was the town's mayor for 42 years, from 1953 to 1995. Rimane later became a hydraulic exploitation technician at EDF Guyane.

== Activism and local politics ==
During the 2017 social unrest in French Guiana, Rimane led the Kolectif pou lagwiyann dékolé movement as its spokesperson. As a labor organizer, Rimane is a member of the EDF Guyane trade union. He has also served as general secretary of the Union of Guianese Workers (UTG).

In 2020, Rimane was elected to be a local councilor in Kourou.

== National Assembly of France ==
=== 2017 election ===
In 2017, Rimane contested the election for French Guiana's 2nd constituency as the candidate of La France Insoumise. Rimane was narrowly defeated in the second round of the election by Lénaïck Adam of La République En Marche!.

| Candidate | Party | First round | | Second round | |
| Candidate | Party | Votes | % | Votes | % |
|---|---|---|---|---|---|
| Lénaïck Adam | LREM | 3,595 | 36.44 | 6,670 | 50.21 |
| Davy Rimane | LFI | 2,001 | 20.28 | 6,614 | 49.79 |
Source: Ministry of the Interior, political parties

=== 2018 by-election ===
Following his defeat, Rimane appealed the results of the election to the Constitutional Council, claiming to have identified voting irregularities during the count. Adam's election was invalidated on 8 December 2017 by the Constitutional Council, leading to a March 2018 by-election for the seat.

Due to the close result in the 2017 contest, a number of leading left-wing figures campaigned for Rimane in the by-election. LFI leader Jean-Luc Mélenchon visited French Guiana to campaign for Rimane, and was accompanied by Member of the European Parliament (MEP) Younous Omarjee and FI deputy Danièle Obono. Rimane also received the support of Gabriel Serville, the member of the National Assembly for French Guiana's 2nd constituency. Adam ultimately defeated Rimane by a narrow 50.65% to 49.35% margin.

| Candidate | Party | First round | | | Second round | | |
| Candidate | Party | Votes | % | +/– | Votes | % | +/– |
|---|---|---|---|---|---|---|---|
| Lénaïck Adam | LREM | 5,927 | 43.10 | +6.65 | 8,320 | 50.65 | +0.44 |
| Davy Rimane | LFI | 4,830 | 35.12 | +14.84 | 8,107 | 49.35 | –0.44 |
Source: Préfecture de la Guyane, Préfecture de la Guyane

=== 2022 election ===
In April 2022, Rimane formally confirmed his intention to contest the seat for a third time in the 2022 French legislative election. As a candidate, he pledged to sit in the New Ecologic and Social People's Union (NUPES) group within the National Assembly. Rimane defeated Adam in the second round of voting by a margin of 54.12% to 45.88%.

== Personal life ==
Rimane is known to be a fan of football, and plays for the local Kourou town hall COS team. He has three children.
