= Lénaïck Adam =

French politician

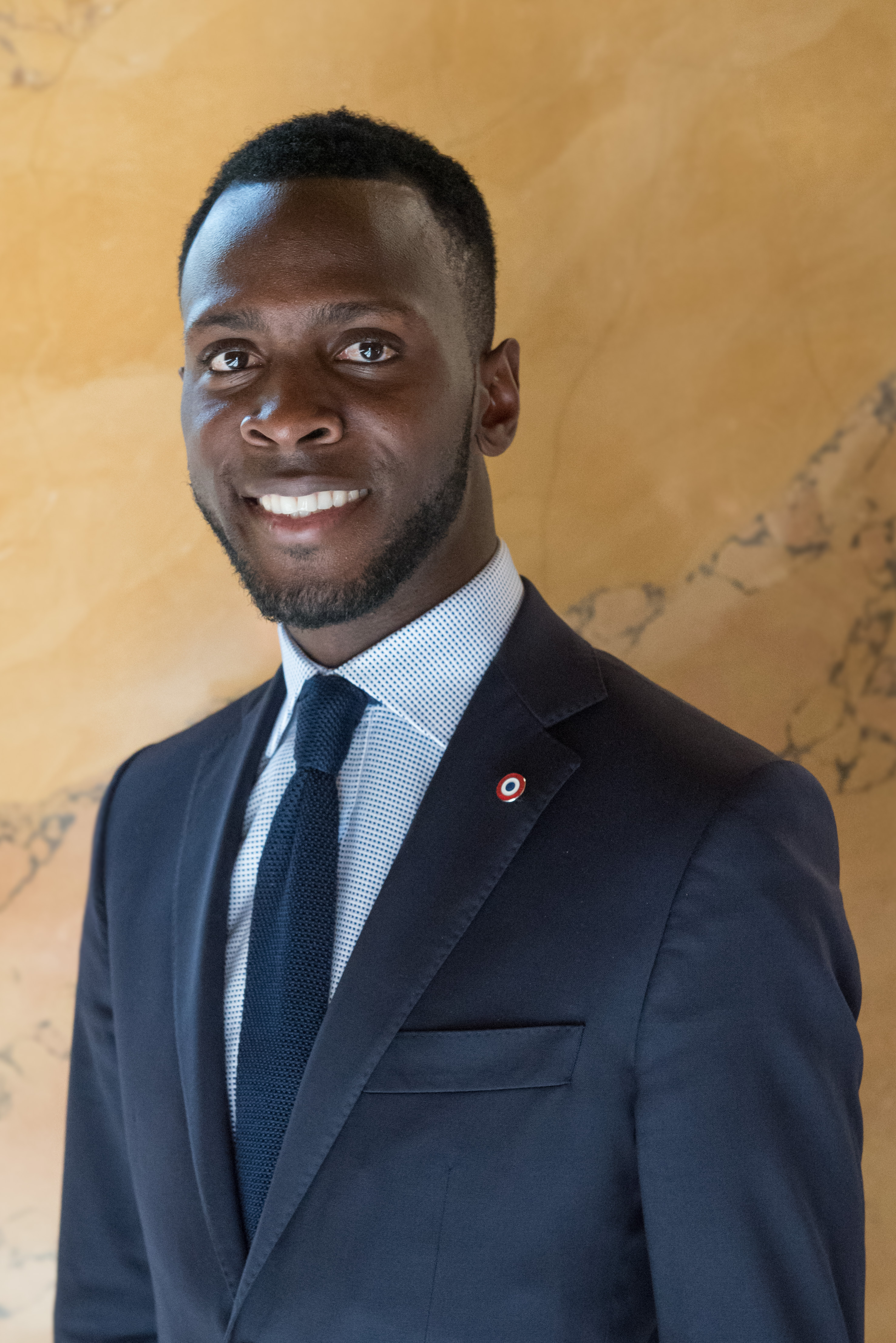

Secretary of the National Assembly
- In office 3 April 2018 – 18 June 2022
- President: Emmanuel Macron
- Prime Minister: Édouard Philippe; Jean Castex
- President: François de Rugy; Richard Ferrand

Member of the National Assembly for French Guiana
- In office 12 March 2018 – 18 June 2022
- Preceded by: Himself
- Succeeded by: Davy Rimane
- Constituency: 2nd constituency
- In office 21 June 2017 – 8 December 2017
- Preceded by: Chantal Berthelot
- Succeeded by: Himself
- Constituency: 2nd constituency

Personal details
- Born: 19 February 1992 (age 34) Saint-Laurent-du-Maroni, French Guiana, France
- Party: Renaissance
- Education: Paris Institute of Political Studies; Mackenzie Presbyterian University
- Occupation: Business executive

Adam Lenaïck (born 19 February 1992) is a French politician of Renaissance (RE) who was a member of the National Assembly from 2018 until 2022, representing department of French Guiana.

== Early life ==
Adam was born on 19 February 1992, in Saint-Laurent-du-Maroni. He is Surinamese origins of Ndyuka people. He graduated with a Baccalauréat in 2011 and then entered the Paris Institute of Political Studies. In 2013, at the end of the bachelor's degree, he spent a year at Mackenzie Presbyterian University (Brazil) to learn the Portuguese language. In 2014, he entered a master's degree in finance and strategy at Sciences Po Paris, where he graduated in 2016.

In parallel with his studies, Adam held positions within his father's river freight transport company, Maroni Transports & Liaisons, while ensuring the management of two other companies, in river transport and in the promotion of real estate and investment.

== Political career ==
From 2015, Adam worked as adviser to the assembly of French Guiana, elected in the section of Saint-Laurent-du-Maroni.

=== Member of the National Assembly ===
In the 2017 legislative elections, Adam was elected to represent French Guiana's 2nd constituency, with 50.22% of the vote in the second round with 50.22% of the vote. He is the youngest deputy in the history of French Guiana and the first Bushinengue elected at the French National Assembly.

His election was invalidated on 8 December 2017 by the Constitutional Council, due to the absence of assessors in two polling stations, resulting in the cancellation of the votes cast in them. Since the number of canceled ballots was greater than the difference of votes between the two candidates present in the second round, a by-election was organized Following the by-election, he was re-elected in March 2018.

In parliament, Adam has been a member of the Finance Committee since 2018. In addition to his committee assignments, he has since been part of the Assembly's bureau, under the leadership of successive presidents François de Rugy (2017-2018) and Richard Ferrand (since 2018). He is also a member of the French-Nigerian Parliamentary Friendship Group. Adam ran for parliament in the 2022 French legislative election, but was not elected.

== Political positions ==
In July 2019, Adam decided not to align with his parliamentary group's majority and became one of 52 LREM members who abstained from a vote on the French ratification of the European Union’s Comprehensive Economic and Trade Agreement (CETA) with Canada.

In 2020, Adam went against his parliamentary group's majority and abstained from an important vote on a much discussed security bill drafted by his colleagues Alice Thourot and Jean-Michel Fauvergue that helps, among other measures, curtail the filming of police forces.

== See also ==
- 2017 French legislative election
- French Guiana's 2nd constituency
- 2018 French Guiana's 2nd constituency by-election
