= French Guiana's 2nd constituency =

Constituency of the French Fifth Republic

2nd constituency of French Guiana
- inline Constituency of the National Assembly of France

- Map of National Assembly constituencies in French Guiana
- Deputy: Davy Rimane; DVG
- Department: French Guiana
- Cantons: Iracoubo, Kourou, Macouria, Mana, Maripasoula, Montsinéry-Tonnegrande, Saint-Laurent-du-Maroni, Sinnamary
- Registered voters: 101,346

The 2nd constituency of French Guiana is a French legislative constituency in the French Guiana département. Comprising the western two-thirds of the département, the 2nd constituency contains the major communes of Saint-Laurent-du-Maroni (population: 47,621) and Kourou (population: 24,903).

The constituency is represented by Davy Rimane, a left-wing politician aligned with La France Insoumise, who won the seat in the 2022 legislative election.

== Deputies ==
Election	Member	Party
1988	Léon Bertrand	RPR
1993	Léon Bertrand	RPR
1997	Léon Bertrand	RPR
2002	Léon Bertrand	UMP
2007	Chantal Berthelot	DVG
2012	Chantal Berthelot	DVG
2017	Lénaïck Adam	LREM
2018	Lénaïck Adam	LREM
2022	Davy Rimane	DVG

== Election results ==
=== 2024 ===
Candidate	Label	First round		Second round			
Candidate	Label	Votes	%	Votes	%		
Davy Rimane	DVG	8,307	60.21	8,422	16.95		
Sophie Charles	DVC	3,516	25.49				
Jean-Philippe Dolor	DVC	1,110	8.05				
Aldo Neman	DVG	594	4.31				
Sébastien Caugant	LO	269	1.95				
Votes		13,796	100.00			8,422	100.00
Valid votes		13,796	96.06			8,422	91.94
Blank votes		296	2.06	616	6.72		
Null votes		270	1.88	122	1.33		
Turnout		14,362	28.92	9,160	18.44		
Abstentions		35,293	71.08	40,524	81.56		
Registered voters		49,655		49,684			
Source:						DVGHOLD	

=== 2022 ===
Davy Rimane, aligned to La France Insoumise, was elected to the seat in the 2022 French legislative election.

Legislative Election 2022: French Guiana's 2nd constituency
Party	Candidate	Votes	%	±%
LREM (Ensemble)	Lénaïck Adam	3,754	31.87	-11.23
DVG	Davy Rimane	2,131	21.31	−13.81
REG	Manuel Victor Jean-Baptiste	1,425	12.10	N/A
DVG	Christophe Yanuwana Pierre	1,312	11.14	N/A
LR (UDC)	Jean-Philippe Dolor	1,303	11.06	N/A
DVG	Gillermo Joje	484	4.11	N/A
RN	Virgine Thomas	425	3.61	+1.81
DVG	Wender Karam	416	3.53	N/A
DLF (RPR)	Jenny Bunch	149	1.27	N/A
Turnout		11,778	26.08	−8.68
2nd round result
DVG	Davy Rimane*	8,276	54.12	+4.77
LREM (Ensemble)	Lénaïck Adam	7,015	45.88	−4.77
Turnout		15,291	33.58	−8.94
DVG gain from LREM		Swing	4.77	

* Davy Rimane did not officially stand as an LFI candidate, but is supported by them and intends to sit with the NUPES alliance in the National Assembly.

=== 2018 by-election ===
Candidate	Party	First round			Second round		
Candidate	Party	Votes	%	+/–	Votes	%	+/–
Lénaïck Adam	REM–UDI	5,927	43.10	+6.65	8,320	50.65	+0.44
Davy Rimane	FI	4,830	35.12	+14.84	8,107	49.35	–0.44
David Riché	PSG	1,385	10.07	+10.07			
José Makébé	DVD	683	4.97	+4.97			
Richard Joigny	PPG	305	2.22	–3.58			
Jean-Philippe Dolor	DVG	271	1.97	+1.97			
Jérôme Harbourg	FN	248	1.80	+1.80			
Georges Mignot	UPR	104	0.76	–1.02			
Mylène Mazia	DVG	0	0.00	–			
Votes		13,753	100.00	–	16,427	100.00	–
Valid votes		13,753	97.47	+1.57	16,427	97.48	+1.47
Blank votes		183	1.30	–1.35	258	1.53	–0.80
Null votes		174	1.23	–0.22	166	0.67	–0.99
Turnout		14,110	34.76	+8.67	16,851	41.52	+6.42
Abstentions		26,477	65.24	–8.67	23,737	58.48	–6.42
Registered voters		40,587			40,588		
Source: Préfecture de la Guyane, Préfecture de la Guyane

=== 2017 ===
Candidate	Party	First round		Second round	
Candidate	Party	Votes	%	Votes	%
Lénaïck Adam	REM	3,595	36.44	6,670	50.21
Davy Rimane	REG	2,001	20.28	6,614	49.79
Chantal Berthelot*	DVG	1,919	19.45		
Jean-Étienne Antoinette	DVG	934	9.47		
Richard Joigny	PPG	571	5.79		
Juliana Rimane	LR	429	4.35		
Paul Persdam	FI	241	2.44		
Bernard Taddeï	UPR	175	1.77		
Votes		9,865	100.00	13,284	100.00
Valid votes		9,865	95.90	13,284	96.01
Blank votes		272	2.64	323	2.33
Null votes		150	1.46	229	1.66
Turnout		10,287	26.10	13,836	35.10
Abstentions		29,134	73.90	25,586	64.90
Registered voters		39,421		39,422	
Source: Ministry of the Interior, political parties * Incumbent deputy

=== 2012 ===
Legislative Election 2012: French Guiana 2nd - 2nd round
Party	Candidate	Votes	%	±%
DVG	Chantal Berthelot	7,081	61.00	
UMP	Léon Bertrand	4,528	39.00	
Turnout		12,078	39.19	
DVG hold		Swing		

=== 2007 ===
Legislative Election 2007: French Guiana 2nd - 2nd round
Party	Candidate	Votes	%	±%
DVG	Chantal Berthelot	9,012	52.87	
UMP	Léon Bertrand	8,034	47.13	
Turnout		17,901	44.21	
DVG hold		Swing		

=== 2002 ===
Legislative Election 2002: French Guiana 2nd - 2nd round
Party	Candidate	Votes	%	±%
UMP	Léon Bertrand	7,169	64.46	
DVG	Jean-Etienne Antoinette	3,952	35.54	
Turnout		11,791	36.52	
UMP hold		Swing		

== Sources ==
- French Interior Ministry results website: "Résultats électoraux officiels en France" (in French).
- "Résultats électoraux officiels en France" (in French). 2017.
