= Coopérative des Pêcheurs de Guyane =

Fishing enterprise in French Guiana

Coopérative des Pêcheurs de Guyane (CODEPEG) is a fishing enterprise in French Guiana. It is based in the capital, Cayenne, and was formed on June 15, 1983. Former directors include Jean-Marie Taubira.
