= Breton Party =

Breton political party in France

Breton Party French: Parti breton Breton: Strollad Breizh
- President: Mathieu Guihard (since 2020)
- Vice Presidents: Maëlig Tredan and Gildas Perrot
- General Secretary: Yannis Bizien
- Spokesperson: Maël Egron
- Founded: 2003
- Headquarters: Pleurtuit, Ille-et-Vilaine
- Youth wing: Movement of Young Bretons (Ar Vretoned Yaouank)
- Ideology: Breton nationalism Social democracy Pro-Europeanism
- European affiliation: FUEN
- Colors: Turquoise

Website
- partibreton.bzh

The Breton Party (French: Parti Breton, Breton: Strollad Breizh) is a social-democratic and Breton nationalist party which aspires to the creation of an independent republic of Brittany, within the European Union.

== Program ==
The movement was created in 2003. Its objective is to give Brittany the necessary institutions for its economic, social, cultural, environmental and political development. Brittany is defined as both the modern administrative Région of Brittany and the département of Loire-Atlantique, which includes Nantes, the former capital of the Duchy of Brittany. Its aspirations include regional autonomy comparable to other European regions as Flanders or Catalonia, or full independence, as with Ireland.

The main idea is that Brittany has always been a nation, therefore has rights and liberties within the European Union. The Breton Party claims the creation of a Breton State, member of the European Union, officially recognized by international authorities. It argues that beyond the principle that a nation should have independent rights, Brittany also has everything to gain by such a process of emancipation, on economic, cultural or environmental fronts.

The slogan of the Breton Party is "For an emancipated, ecological, supportive, and enterprising Brittany". Analyzing the causes for the "stagnation of the Breton political movements", the party wants "to take the Bretons as they are and not as one would like them to be". In terms of the left-right axis, the Breton Party is considered to be centrist. The main objective is first of all to create Breton political institutions. Claiming 400 members, most of whom have had no association with the earlier Breton movement, the Breton Party has members from the center-left, such as the professor and the contractor Jean-Paul Moisan from Nantes, or the center-right, such as Gérard Olliéric, the former president of the party.

== Youth Wing ==
Ar Vretoned Yaouank is the youth section of the party created in 2007. Its purpose is to lead activities specific to youth connected to the party, but in an informal way. In 2008 the Young Bretons participated in the International Youth Days organized by the Basque National Party in Bilbao and were received by the Lehendakari, leader of the Basque government.

== Elections ==
The Breton Party has contested several elections: two by-elections in 2004, and again in 2005. Its candidates obtained for their first outing between 1.5% and 4% of the vote.

In the general election of 2007, 4 candidates were put forward:

- Yves Le Mestric for the constituency of Vitré (Ille-et-Vilaine): 686 votes or 0.89%
- Gérard Guillemot for the constituency of Rennes (Ille-et-Vilaine): 249 votes or 0.57%
- Emile Granville for the constituency of Redon (Ille-et-Vilaine): 847 votes or 1.27%
- Hervé Le Guen for the constituency of Lorient (Morbihan): 686 votes or 1.44%

In a local by-election in Redon on September 23, 2007, Émile Granville obtained 3.58%. In a 2009 by-election in the same canton, he won 4.08%.

In 2008, Yann Jestin, president of Askol, obtained 19,44% of the votes during the cantonal elections in Lesneven.

During the municipal elections in March 2008, the Breton Party ran about twenty candidates and obtained about ten municipal elected representatives among whom were a mayor and three deputies.

In the 2009 European elections, the party ran one list in the West constituency, which won 2.45% across the five Breton departments. Its highest result was 3.41% in the Finistère. It won up to 16% in a commune in the Côtes-d'Armor department.

In the 2010 French regional elections the Breton Party fielded candidates in Brittany and the Pays de Loire regions, viz;

- Christian Troadec for the presidency of Brittany: 47,108 votes or 4.29%
- Jacky Flippot for the presidency of Pays de Loire: 11,669 votes or 0.99% (most from the city of Nantes)

=== 2012 Legislative Elections ===
For the 2012 French legislative election, the Breton Party presented 2 candidates who achieved a total score of 1.08% across these 2 constituencies

Résultats détaillés par circonscription
Circonscription	Candidat	Voix	%
Second Constituency of Côtes-d'Armor	Yves Pelle	701	1,19
Sixth Constituency of Morbihan	Claudine Perron	573	1,03

=== 2014 European Elections ===
During the 2014 European elections, the party presented five candidates in the West constituency on the list 'Nous te ferons Europe!' in alliance with Brittany Movement and Progress and Breizh Europa, led by Christian Troadec. Despite being geographically limited to Brittany, the list obtained 3.05% (83,041 votes) across the constituency, surpassing the reimbursement threshold. This surprisingly high score for the regionalist movement was achieved despite the presence of a list led by the Breton Democratic Union and another by Breizhistance in alliance with the NPA

Detailed results by department
Department	Votes	%
Côtes-d'Armor	17,046	8,18 %
Finistère	34,171	11,54 %
Ille-et-Vilaine	8,265	2,73 %
Loire-Atlantique	4,786	1,15 %
Morbihan	16,406	6,60 %

=== 2015 Regional Elections ===
During the 2015 Regional Elections, the Breton Party supported the list "Our Chance, Independence" led by Bertrand Deléon. This list faced competition from Breizhistance in alliance with the NPA, and a regionalist list supported by the Breton Democratic Union and the Brittany Movement and Progress. This election marked the split between the Breton Party and Christian Troadec's movement. The list supported by the Breton Party finished last with 0.54% of the votes (6,521 votes). No voting instructions were given for the second round

Detailed results by department
Department	Votes	%
Côtes-d'Armor	1,161	0,48 %
Finistère	1,911	0,56 %
Ille-et-Vilaine	1,790	0,53 %
Morbihan	1,659	0,58 %

=== 2017 Legislative Elections ===
At the 2017 French legislative elections, the Breton Party presented candidates in all the 31 circonscriptions of Brittany with its ally Ecology at the Centre. The vote took place juste after Emmanuel Macron's election as president of France and was then difficult for other parties than the new head of state's LREM, but the Breton Party got more than 1% in 10 of them.

=== 2021 Regional Elections ===
The Breton Party obtained 1.55% of the votes and came 9th out of 13 in an election strongly marked by abstention. A result which does not make it possible to maintain the second place but which is distinguished by a number of votes twice as high compared to 2015 with 13,193 votes in the Brittany region (compared to 6,521 votes in 2015).

Detailed results by department
Department	Votes	%
Côtes-d'Armor	3,170	1,85 %
Finistère	3,516	1,49 %
Ille-et-Vilaine	3,094	1.24%
Morbihan	3,413	1,75 %

=== 2022 Legislative Elections and The Federation of United Countries ===
January 15, 2022 marks the launch of “La Fédération des Pays Unis”, an alliance designed to unite various regionalist, autonomist and independantist parties.

It was created following a veto preventing the Breton Party from joining Regions and Peoples with Solidarity and the reason for its creation was to be able to present candidates in over 50 constituencies and thus benefit from public subsidies. The party fielded a total of 34 candidates, including 2 living outside France.

The Breton Party obtained 15,205 votes and decided not to give any voting instructions.

Detailed results by department
Department	Votes	%
Côtes-d'Armor	1,989	0,78 %
Finistère	3,531	0,95 %
Ille-et-Vilaine	2,605	0.67%
Morbihan	2,871	0,99 %
Loire-Atlantique	3,931	0,76 %

=== 2024 Legislative Elections ===
The 2024 French legislative election were triggered by the dissolution of the National Assembly, which came as a surprise to minor parties that had to run a less prepared campaign than expected. This was the case for the Breton Party, which presented 13 candidates (including one in Paris) compared to 34 in the previous elections. The Breton Party received 12,808 votes, averaging 1.46% per constituency.

Detailed results by department
Department	Votes	%
Côtes-d'Armor	1,858	0,53 %
Finistère	1,135	0,22 %
Ille-et-Vilaine	2,787	0.48%
Morbihan	3,777	0,84 %
Loire-Atlantique	3,018	0,40 %
Paris	234	0,02 %
