= Jean-Étienne Antoinette =

French Guianan politician (born 1966)

Jean-Étienne Antoinette (French pronunciation: [ʒɑ̃ etjɛn ɑ̃twanɛt]; born 29 January 1966) is a French Guianan politician. He is a former member of the Senate of France. He was the mayor of Kourou, French Guinea.

== Political career ==
A trained teacher, Jean-Étienne Antoinette served as mayor of Kourou from 1996 to 2014. He is a member of the political movement Walwari.

In June 2002, he ran in French Guiana's 2nd constituency during the 2002 legislative elections, but was defeated in the second round by Léon Bertrand, receiving 35.54% of the vote.

Elected to the French Senate in the Miscellaneous left (DVG) category representing French Guiana on 21 September 2008, he sat as an affiliated member of the Socialist group. In 2011, he was elected vice-president of the Senate Committee on Culture, Education and Communication.

In 2015, he replaced Rémy‑Louis Budoc as a member of the Economic, Social and Environmental Council.

In June 2017, he once again stood in the 2nd constituency of French Guiana during the 2017 legislative elections, but was eliminated in the first round with 9.47% of the vote.
