= Young Bretons Movement =

Young Bretons Movement: Ar Vretoned Yaouank; Mouvement des Jeunes Bretons
- Founded: 2007
- Ideology: Breton nationalism Breton separatism Social democracy Centrism; Social liberalism European federalism
- Colors: Turquoise

Website
- jeunes.partibreton.org

The Young Bretons Movement, Breton Ar Vretoned Yaouank, is the youth section of the Breton Party. It was founded in March 2007.

== Launch and Ideas ==
The YBM/AVY was launched officially at a Breton Party Congress in Blain, in March 2007. At the beginning, it was formed of a few members of the party willing to make actions and proposals specific to the youth. At their launch, the Young Bretons published the "Young Bretons Manifesto", in which they denounce what they think are France's failures on the political, economical and cultural fields. They criticized the French attitude towards Europe and the failure of decentralization and public reforms in general, and called out to "emancipation" and reunification of Brittany, within a federal Europe.

As the Breton Party, the YBM/AVY advocates a new approach to Breton issues, by emphasizing the European dimension of their ideas : they reject the idea of identity withdrawal and claim they want to simply exist as the other countries. The lead idea of the Manifesto is the point that in a European framework, which is the movement's reference, Brittany is a country like any other, and therefore must have the same political rights as Estonia, Slovenia or Ireland.

In March 2008, for the city council elections, the Young Bretons published a document called "It’s now we must change things", which summarizes their proposals on topics specific to youth such as housing and universities. They propose, among other items, to struggle against the building of secondary homes on the seaside, or to create a Breton university system which regroups universities and colleges, all this within the framework of Brittany as a member of the European Union.

In August 2008, the Young Bretons held a three-day multi organisation meeting with other youth movements in the Lorient. On the 10 August the meeting closed with the youth movements of the Basque Nationalist Party, the New Flemish Alliance, and the Young Bretons signing a joint declaration supporting self-determination for stateless nations.

== Main subjects ==
Beyond the institutional issues, the YBM/AVY mainly addresses the European, university and environment issues. Thus, they have several times advocated a federal Europe and criticized French policies towards Europe, that are in their opinion not enough in favour of European integration. The movement often takes a stand on university reforms : thus, it denounced the 2007 University Freedom and Responsibility Act which, in their opinion, is a mere transfer of expenses without a real autonomy. Likewise, the YBM/AVY opposes introducing student fees and takes as an example the Welsh universities. It also calls out to the regional council to make up for the state's reduction of expenses as far as help for disabled persons is concerned. The Young Bretons also organized campaigns to raise the public awareness on issues linked with the seaside, in particular housing. They denounced the bulge of secondary homes and proposed a stronger seaside act, as well as a limitation (by tax) of the numbers of buildings, as well as the creation of protected markets.

== Magazine ==
Since the end of 2008, the Young Bretons have published a webzine called Yaouankiz (Youth) three times a year. It aims at broadcasting their ideas on current issues (economy, social) or on theories (Breton nationalism). The webzine is published on their website.

== Relations with other organizations ==
Since the beginning, the YBM/AVY has had relations with other nationalist movements in Europe, whether from the centre-left or the centre-right. In December 2006, they participated in Bilbao in the international youth days for self-determination, organized by Euzko Gaztedi (EGI). They have links with YEN (Youth of European Nationalities – gathering youth associations from national or cultural minorities in Europe), and participated in several of their seminars.

== See also ==
- Breton Party
- Social-democracy
- Liberal democracy
