= 2017 social unrest in French Guiana =

- Date: 20 March 2017 - 21 April 2017
- Location: French Guiana
- Caused by: Issues of insecurity and infrastructure
- Goals: 2.5€ billion aid package
- Methods: Political demonstrations
- Result: Emergency relief of up to 2.1€ billion

The 2017 social unrest in French Guiana was a series of protests and strikes led by the "Collective of 500 Brothers" to highlight the issues of insecurity and infrastructure in French Guiana, France. It began on March 20, 2017 in Kourou, and spread all over French Guiana within a few days. Several international rocket and satellite launches were postponed, and March 28 saw the largest demonstration ever held in French Guiana.

The protesters asked for more resources, and turned down a government pledge of 1€ billion in infrastructure. Demonstrators, led by the 500 Brothers, demanded $2.5 billion in aid. Labor union leaders and three local politicians occupied the Guiana Space Centre on April 4–5, 2017. Supermarkets no longer sold fresh products due to road blocks in April 2017. The strikes became an issue in the 2017 French presidential election.

== Context ==
French Guiana is fraught with tensions between different communities (indigenous peoples, descendants of African slaves, immigrants from Brazil, Suriname and Haiti, and Europeans) as well as an economic crisis and a rise in insecurity. Per capita income at €15,000 is lower than mainland France; the unemployment rate is 23 percent and more than 40 percent for 18-to-25-year-olds; the cost of living is higher than in mainland France due to the need to import most goods and EU-sanctioned tariffs with neighboring Brazil and Suriname; foreign nationals are 35 percent as opposed to 6.5 percent in mainland France; and the murder rate is the highest anywhere in France with 42 homicides in 2016. Moreover, the consumption of illicit drugs like cannabis, cocaine and crack, is very high. Cayenne is also a hub of drug-trafficking; in 2016, 371 drug-traffickers were arrested on flights to Europe.

== Strikes ==
The strikes are led by the "Collective of 500 Brothers", a group of men who wear balaclavas. They are meant to expose the rise in insecurity, the deterioration of access to health care, the rise in illicit gold placer mining, and illegal immigration.

The strikes began in Kourou on March 20, 2017, to oppose the privatization of a hospital run by the Red Cross and the rise in insecurity. Within a few days, they spread to Cayenne and Saint-Laurent-du-Maroni, followed by Maripasoula and Papaichton.

Protesters blocked roads, which led to the cancellation of flights from the Cayenne – Félix Eboué Airport to Paris. It also led to the postponement of the launch of an Ariane 5 rocket with SGDC's Brazilian satellite and the KT Corporation's Koreasat-7 South Korean satellite.

By March 23, 2017, the campus of the University of French Guiana as well as schools, administrative buildings and the harbour were closed. Meanwhile, French Guianans bought food in bulk, and muggings were reported.

March 28 was dubbed a "dead day" by local media, with everything closed. There were between 8,000 and 10,000 demonstrators in Cayenne and between 3,500 and 4,000 in Saint-Laurent-du-Maroni, leading the prefecture of French Guiana to call it "the largest demonstration ever held in French Guiana." The demonstrators carried the flag of French Guiana and placards reading "Nou bon ké sa", which means "enough is enough" in Guianan Créole. They were asking the French government for more resources.

On April 3, 2017, as rocket launches from the Guiana Space Centre were suspended, "Europe's first high-power, all-electric satellite", Eutelsat's Eutelsat-172b, was returned to the Airbus factory near Toulouse until further notice. Additionally, the launch of the $625 million ViaSat-2 internet satellite, scheduled for April 25, was postponed.

On April 4, 2017, another demonstration was held in Kourou. In the evening, 30 labour union leaders visited the Guiana Space Centre to meet its director, Didier Faivre, and began to occupy the premises until their demands are met. Alongside the 30 union leaders are three politicians: Gabriel Serville, a member of the National Assembly for the Guianese Socialist Party; Antoine Karam, a member of the French Senate for the Socialist Party; and Léon Bertrand, the mayor of Saint-Laurent-du-Maroni. As of April 5, 2017, the protesters decided to wait inside until the arrival of the president of the National Centre for Space Studies, Jean-Yves Le Gall, scheduled for April 6, 2017. However, they left the premises on April 5, 2017.

On April 7, 2017, protesters were waiting to meet the prefect of French Guiana, Martin Jaeger, but their appointment was cancelled. As a result, a violent protest took place outside the building of the prefecture in Cayenne. Tear gas was used by the police. Meanwhile, one policeman was seriously injured during the protest. The following day, on April 8, 2017, members of the Collective of 500 Brothers visited him in hospital to find common ground. As of April 7, supermarkets had run out of fresh products due to the road blocks. In particular, bottled water, milk, flour and meat were no longer available.

On April 21, the French government signed an agreement with protesters authorizing an emergency relief of up to 2.1 billion euros, which includes funds for security, education, healthcare, and business aid. Roadblocks were removed the following day, and operations at the Kourou space center resumed on April 24.

== Reactions ==
On March 24, 2017, the United States Department of State advised their citizens against visiting French Guiana due to the unrest.

On March 25, 2017, Prime Minister Bernard Cazeneuve called for a return to peace and dialogue. Three days later, on March 28, 2017, ministers Matthias Fekl and Ericka Bareigts visited French Guiana. They pledged a €1 billion investment in infrastructure. The offer was turned down by the protesters, who asked for a "special status" on April 2, 2017 and a €2.5 billion "aid package" on April 3, 2017.

On April 3, 2017, Prime Minister Cazeneuve said that €2.5 billion was "unrealistic". On April 5, 2017, Socialist Senator Georges Patient demanded €3.2 billion to build schools and hospitals. The same day, the French government agreed to build more schools and a new police station in Cayenne. Meanwhile, the local chapter of the Mouvement des Entreprises de France called for an end to the road blocks.

As the strikes were happening in the midst of the campaign for the 2017 French presidential election, several candidates commented on it. For example, François Fillon blamed the situation on President François Hollande's failed policies, while Marine Le Pen blamed it on illegal immigration.

== See also ==
- 2009 French Caribbean general strikes
