= For Brittany! =

- General Secretary: André Lavanant
- Spokesperson: Christian Troadec
- Founded: 2010
- Headquarters: 29540 Spézet
- Ideology: Breton nationalism Regionalism; Socialism; Ecology
- County Council of Finistère: 1 / 54
- County Council of Morbihan: 1 / 42
- Regional Council of Brittany: 1 / 83

Website
- www.mouvement-bretagne-progres.fr

For Brittany! (Breton: Breizh War Raok) (BWR) is a Breton political movement created in 2010.

== History ==
Created by Christian Troadec in the 2010 regional elections under the slogan, "We'll make Brittany again" where the party got 4.29% of the vote. The movement was created as a left wing autonomist party that is independent of the PS.

The main spokesman of the party, Christian Troadec, the mayor of Carhaix-Plouguer and a general councillor in the township of Carhaix-Plouguer. The party also includes Christian Derrien, mayor of Langonnet and a councillor in Gourin

After the success in the regional elections where the party gained two elected representatives, the leaders then affirmed that they wanted to run in bigger elections notably senatorial and legislative.

In the 2011 senatorial elections, the BWR participated in a union with other left wing parties and nominated Hélène Le Ny to contest the senatorial seat in Morbihan held by Joël Labbé, an EELV senator.

In the legislative elections in 2012, Christian Troadec ran in Finistère's 6th constituency and came third with 19.22% of the vote. He got a result that guaranteed him a place in the second round but withdrew due to fear of vote splitting.

The results by township for the support of MBP in the 2014 European Elections

In the European Elections in 2014, the party presented its candidates with the help of the Breton Party and Breizh Europa. The party managed to get 3.05% which allowed it to get reimbursed. This result came despite the presence of an alliance led by the Breton Democratic Union as well as the Breizhistance with help from the NPA.

In the 2015 Regional Elections, the party stood under the "Yes Brittany" coalition with the Breton Democratic Union and received 6.7% of the overall vote in Brittany making Yes Brittany the fourth biggest political force within Brittany. In 2016, both the Breton Democratic Union and Brittany Movement and Progress declared their intention to renew the alliance for the legislative and presidential elections in 2017.
