= Léon Bertrand =

French politician

Delegate Minister for Tourism (Secretary of State until 30 March 2004)
- In office 12 June 2002 – 15 May 2007
- President: Jacques Chirac
- Preceded by: Gilles de Robien (as Minister)
- Succeeded by: Luc Chatel (as Secretary of State)

French deputy
- In office 23 June 1988 – 18 June 2002
- Preceded by: Constituency established
- Succeeded by: Juliana Rimane
- Constituency: French Guiana's 2nd constituency

Mayor of Saint-Laurent-du-Maroni
- In office 13 March 1983 – 25 September 2018
- Preceded by: Raymond Tarcy
- Succeeded by: Sophie Charles

Personal details
- Born: 11 May 1951 (age 74) Saint-Laurent-du-Maroni, French Guiana
- Party: UMP
- Occupation: politician

Léon Bertrand (born 11 May 1951) is a French politician. Previously a professor of physics and biology, he was Mayor of Saint-Laurent-du-Maroni from 1983 until 2018. He was elected to the French National Assembly for the Rally for the Republic representing French Guiana's 2nd constituency in 1988 and was reelected at every election till 2007.

== Biography ==
He described himself in an article published in the French daily Libération when he was a minister, in 2005: "Born on the banks of the Maroni River, in Guyana, a French département in Amazonia situated 7,000 km afar from Paris, grandson of a convict from Vendée who had married a Black woman after his liberation, son of a Creole father and of an Amerindian Surinamese mother, I am Léon Bertrand, with a name typically French but with a physical appearance typically exotic."

He joined the UMP in 2002, and, as a known confidant of President Jacques Chirac, he was named Secretary of State for Tourism in 2002 and later Delegate Minister for Tourism in 2004. He held this office until 15 May 2007. When he was a minister, he realized that "several times, when I received in my office people who didn't know my physical appearance, their republican respectful «Monsieur le ministre» was automatically addressed to my advisor, who was white, and not to me. But what's for me quite exceptional and has very minor consequences as a public person is, on the contrary, the daily lot of all those who belong to what people label «Visible minority»."

Running for re-election as deputy in the 2007 French legislative election, he was surprisingly defeated with 47.1% of the votes in the runoff against Chantal Berthelot (PSG), who won 52.9%. Nonetheless, he was re-elected Mayor of Saint-Laurent-du-Maroni in 2008 by a large margin.

He was nominated as the UMP's top candidate in the 2010 regional elections in French Guiana.

During the night of 27–28 November 2009, Léon Bertrand was arrested and put into custody on charges of favoritism and corruption.

Despite still being in custody, he is candidate on the third place of a right wing list not endorsed by the UMP for the March 2010 regional elections in French Guiana. In 2013, he was sentenced to 3 years imprisonment.

== Political career ==
- 1983-2018 : Mayor of Saint-Laurent-du-Maroni
- 2001- : President of the Community of Communes of Western Guiana.
- 1982-1988: General Councillor of French Guiana, canton of Saint-Laurent-du-Maroni
- 1983-2003: Regional Councillor of French Guiana
- 1988-2007: RPR and then UMP-aligned Député of the Second Circumscription of French Guiana
- 2002-2004: Secretary of State for Tourism, responsible to the Minister of Transport, Infrastructure, Tourism and Sea
- 2004-2007: Delegate Minister for Tourism, responsible to the Minister of Transport, Infrastructure, Tourism and Sea
