= Chantal Berthelot =

French politician (born 1958)

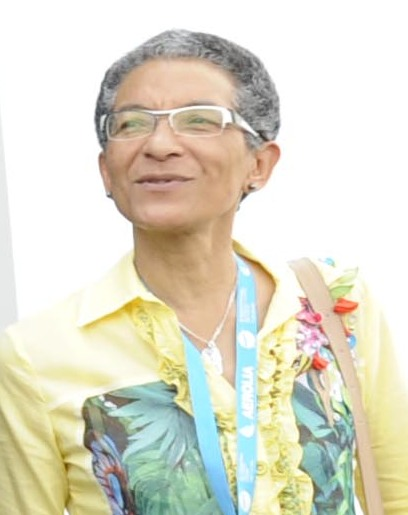
- Chantal Berthelot in 2013

Member of the National Assembly for French Guiana's 2nd constituency
- In office 20 June 2007 – 20 June 2017
- Preceded by: Juliana Rimane
- Succeeded by: Lénaïck Adam

Member of the Regional Council of French Guiana
- In office 16 March 1998 – 18 December 2015
- President: Antoine Karam; Rodolphe Alexandre

Personal details
- Born: 12 September 1958 (age 67) Mana, French Guiana, France
- Party: DVG
- Children: 3

Chantal Berthelot (French: [ʃɑ̃tal bɛʁtəlo]; born 12 September 1958) is a French politician who served in the National Assembly representing French Guiana's 2nd constituency from 2007 to 2017, and was aligned with the Miscellaneous left. Prior to her tenure in the National Assembly she was a member of the Regional Council of Guyana.

== Early life ==
Chantal Berthelot was born in Mana, French Guiana, on 12 September 1958. She works as a cattle breeder and was a founding member of the Regional Group of Farmers of Guyana agricultural union in 1993. She is the mother of three children.

== Career ==
From 1998 to 2010, Berthelot was a member of the Regional Council of Guyana, during which she was 4th vice president from 1998 to 2004, and 1st vice president from 2004 to 2010. In the 2007 election she was elected to the National Assembly representing French Guiana's 2nd constituency and was reelected in 2012. She was listed as part of the Miscellaneous left. She was eliminated during the first round of voting in the 2017 election.

During Berthelot's tenure in the National Assembly she was a member of the Sustainable Development and Regional Planning, Foreign Affairs, Economic Affairs, Social Affairs, and National Defence and Armed Forces committees. She was a member of a group supporting France's bid for the Expo 2025 and president of the French Parliamentary Space Group. She was vice president of the Overseas Delegation to the National Assembly.

In 2023, Berthelot was elected president of Société d'Aménagement Foncier et d'Établissement Rural de Guyane (SAFER).

== Works cited ==
=== News ===
- Guitteau, Gérôme (10 May 2023). "Chantal Berthelot nouvelle présidente de la Safer". France-Guyane. Archived from the original on 19 June 2025.
- "Guyane: la députée apparentée PS Chantal Berthelot éliminée". Le Point. 11 June 2017. Archived from the original on 19 June 2025.

=== Web ===
- "French Guiana's 2nd constituency 2007 election results". Minister of the Interior.
- "French Guiana's 2nd constituency 2012 election results". Minister of the Interior.
- "Functions". National Assembly. Archived from the original on 19 June 2025.
- "Jan Wörner, Igor Komarov, Chantal Berthelot and Joël Barre". European Space Agency. 15 September 2015. Archived from the original on 19 June 2025.
- "Mme Chantal Berthelot". National Assembly. Archived from the original on 19 June 2025.
- "Mrs. Chantal Berthelot - Historical". National Assembly. Archived from the original on 19 June 2025.
- "Your Deputy". Chantal Berthelot. Archived from the original on 15 November 2011.
