= Jean-Marie Taubira =

French Guianan politician (born 1950)

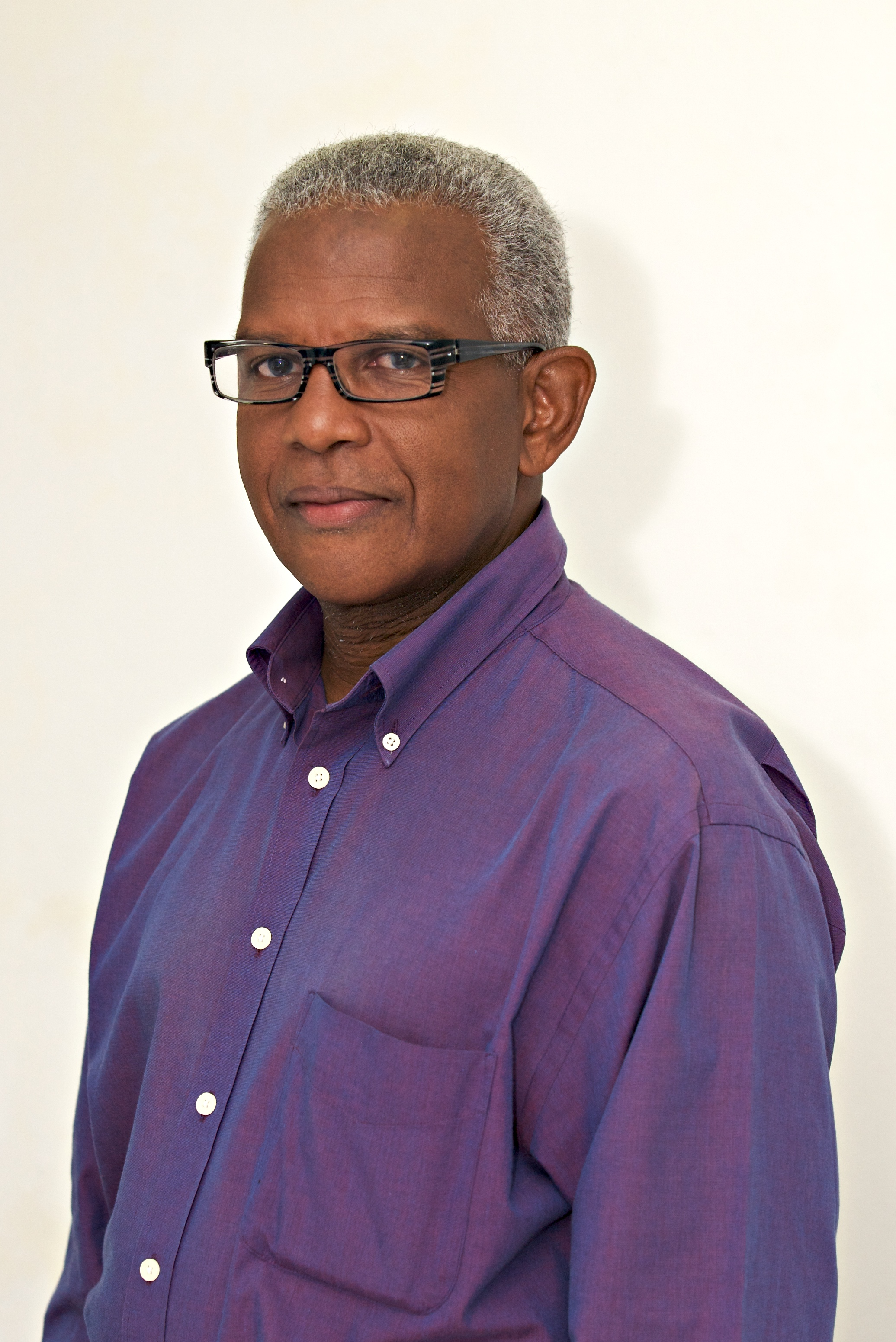
- Jean-Marie Taubira in 2008
- Born: 15 August 1950 (age 74); Cayenne, French Guiana, France
- Occupation: Politician
- Relatives: Christiane Taubira (sister)

Jean-Marie Taubira (French pronunciation: [ʒɑ̃ maʁi tobiʁa]; born 15 August 1950) is a French politician from Cayenne. He was Secretary General of the Walwari party which he co-founded in 1993, later creating the Guianese Progressive Party in 2008.

Taubira has considerable experience in the private sector and economy. He has been Director of the Coopérative des Pêcheurs de Guyane (CODEPEG SA), Director of ATENOR SARL (gold company), Chief Financial Officer of an enterprise group AC: RGI SA (printing), TRIMARG SARL (office), RCI Guyane (radio), Chief Financial Officer for transport, tourism and education, and an advisor to agricultural company E.Z. AGRICOLE.
