= 2027 French presidential election =

- 18 April 2027
- Opinion polls
Incumbent President
Emmanuel Macron
RE

Presidential elections are scheduled to be held in France on 18 April 2027, with a second round on 2 May if no candidate secures a majority vote. The election may be held earlier under exceptional circumstances if the presidency falls vacant before then.

Incumbent president Emmanuel Macron is ineligible to run, as the French constitution limits presidents to two consecutive terms.

== Background ==
The dissolution of the National Assembly announced by Emmanuel Macron following the 2024 European election triggered a period of political instability. Michel Barnier and François Bayrou were each ousted in confidence votes, in December 2024 and September 2025, and Sébastien Lecornu became prime minister.

In March 2025, Marine Le Pen, a declared candidate for the National Rally, was found guilty of embezzlement of European Parliament funds and sentenced at first instance to five years of ineligibility with immediate effect, preventing her from running in upcoming elections. On 7 July 2026, the Court of Appeal of Paris upheld her conviction but reduced her ineligibility sentence to 45 months, 30 of them suspended, and ordered one year under electronic monitoring, clearing the way for her candidacy. Following the ruling, Le Pen said she would run and appeal to the Court of Cassation, which is expected to rule by early January 2027 at the latest.

The left-wing New Popular Front alliance formed in 2024 broke apart over strategic disagreements, particularly between the Socialist Party and La France Insoumise. A planned unitary primary was abandoned over the summer of 2026, and the Socialist Party, Place Publique and the Republican and Socialist Left instead held their own primary on 11 October, which Raphaël Glucksmann won in the first round. Jean-Luc Mélenchon (LFI) and Fabien Roussel (PCF) are running separately.

On the right, The Republicans' members voted on 19 April 2026 to back Bruno Retailleau directly rather than hold a primary; Laurent Wauquiez then withdrew his bid and David Lisnard left the party, while Xavier Bertrand plans to run as an independent. In the centre, Édouard Philippe (Horizons) and Gabriel Attal (Renaissance) are both running, amid fears that their rivalry could leave the two run-off places to the far right and far left.

The number of declared or presumed candidates is unprecedented in the Fifth Republic, with projections of 17 or more candidates against the record of 16 set in 2002. Political scientist Bruno Jeanbart attributes this to "the fragmentation of the political landscape and the decline of the party system" that began in 2017. Political scientists Antoine Bristielle and Élie Michel see it as a symptom of a deep crisis of representation, with parties struggling to fulfill their role in selecting candidates and personal ambitions breaking free from the party framework.

== Electoral system ==
The president of the French Republic is elected to a five-year term under the two-round system as stipulated in Article 7 of the French constitution. If no candidate secures an absolute majority (50% + 1) of votes in the first round, a second round is held two weeks later between the two candidates who received the most votes. Per the constitution, the first round of the presidential election must be held between 20 and 35 days before the conclusion of the president's current five-year term. Emmanuel Macron's second term, which began on 14 May 2022, is scheduled to end on 13 May 2027, meaning that the first round of the presidential election is scheduled to be held between 8 and 23 April 2027.

To be listed on the first-round ballot, candidates must secure 500 signatures (often referred to as parrainages) from national or local elected officials from at least 30 different departments or overseas collectivities, with no more than a tenth of these signatories from any single department. According to the Article 6 of the French constitution, the president cannot "exercise more than two consecutive periods in office".

== Primaries and congresses ==
=== Ecologist primary ===
On 8 December 2025, 86% of members of the The Ecologists chose Marine Tondelier as the party's candidate for the United Left primary. Following the abandonment of the United Left primary, she was confirmed as the party's candidate for the presidential election.

==== Nominee ====
- Marine Tondelier

==== Eliminated ====
- Waleed Mouhali

=== Socialist primary ===
From 9 to 11 October 2026, a primary was held to select a joint candidate of the Socialist Party, Place Publique, and the Republican and Socialist Left. Raphaël Glucksmann won the primary in the first round with 66.1% of votes.

==== Nominee ====
- Raphaël Glucksmann

==== Eliminated ====
- Olivier Faure
- Ségolène Royal
- Emmanuel Maurel
- Jérôme Guedj

=== The Republicans ===
On 19 April 2026, The Republicans held an internal vote among party members on whether to organise a primary election or directly endorse party president Bruno Retailleau's candidacy, with more than 73% voting in favour of backing Retailleau outright. Prior to the vote, three other figures (Xavier Bertrand, David Lisnard, and Laurent Wauquiez) had declared their intention to run in a primary. Since Retailleau secured the party's endorsement, Wauquiez withdrew his bid, Lisnard left the party, and Bertrand is running as an independent candidate.

==== Nominee ====
- Bruno Retailleau

==== Declared intention ====
- Xavier Bertrand (still running)
- David Lisnard (still running)
- Laurent Wauquiez

=== United Left primary (cancelled) ===
The United Left primary was a planned primary election which aimed to select a joint candidate for the presidential election from The Ecologists, L'Après, Debout!, Génération.s, and other left-wing parties. The primary election was eventually abandoned before voting occurred. Both declared candidates of the primary initially announced their intention to run as separate candidates, with François Ruffin dropping out in November 2026 and Marine Tondelier considering dropping out in favour of Jean-Luc Mélenchon.

=== Union of the Right and Centre primary (proposed) ===
A proposed primary could be held to select a joint candidate for the Right and Centre.

==== Potential candidates ====
- Gabriel Attal
- David Lisnard
- Bruno Retailleau

== Declared candidates ==
=== National Rally ===
- Marine Le Pen, Deputy (2017–present); President of the National Rally (2011–2021); National Rally nominee in the 2012, 2017, and 2022 presidential elections; MEP for Île-de-France (2004–2009); MEP for North-West France (2009–2017)
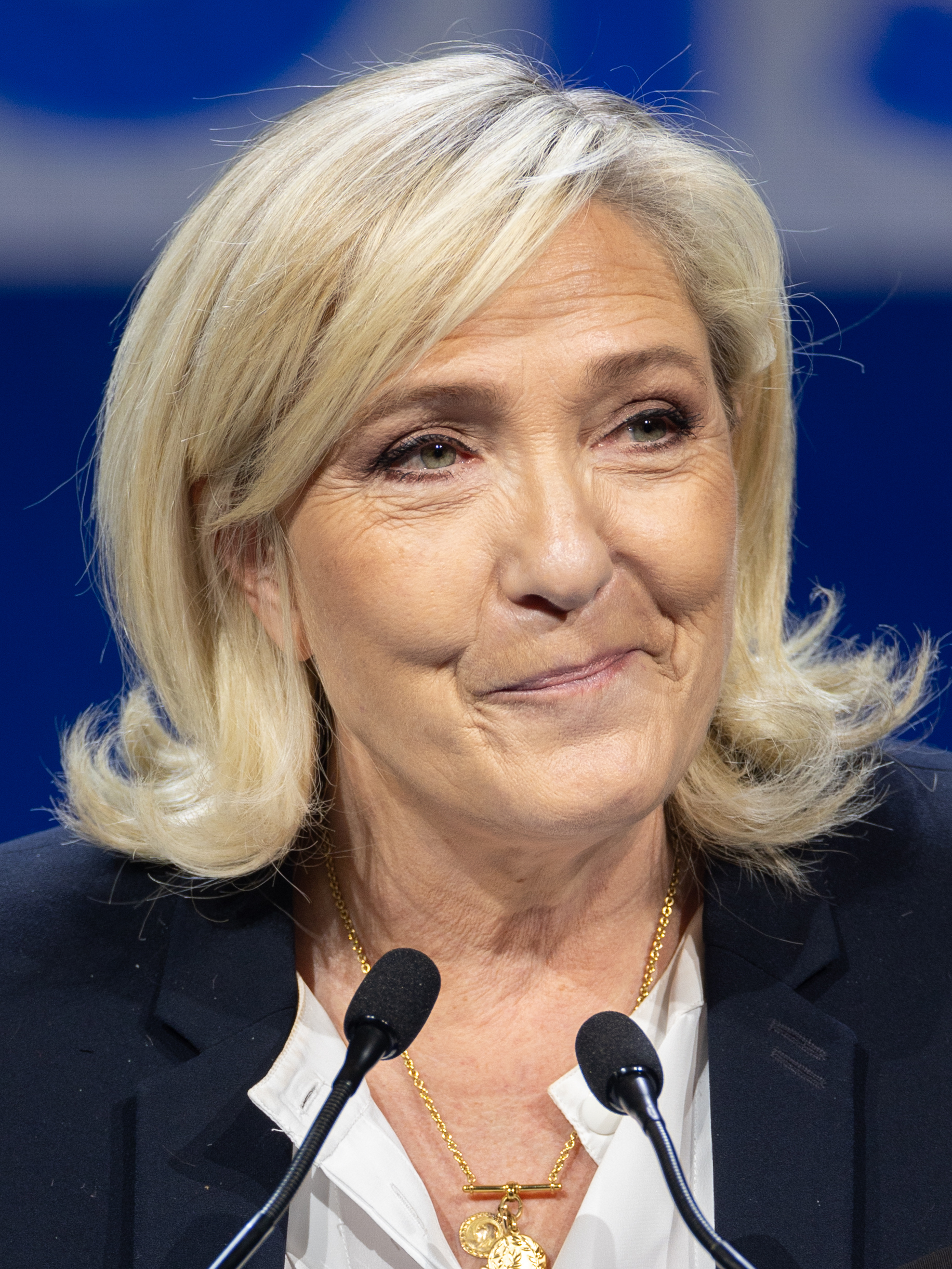
Deputy
Marine Le Pen
(2017–present)

=== Horizons ===
- Édouard Philippe, Prime Minister of France (2017–2020); Mayor of Le Havre (2010–2017; 2020–present); Deputy (2012–2017)
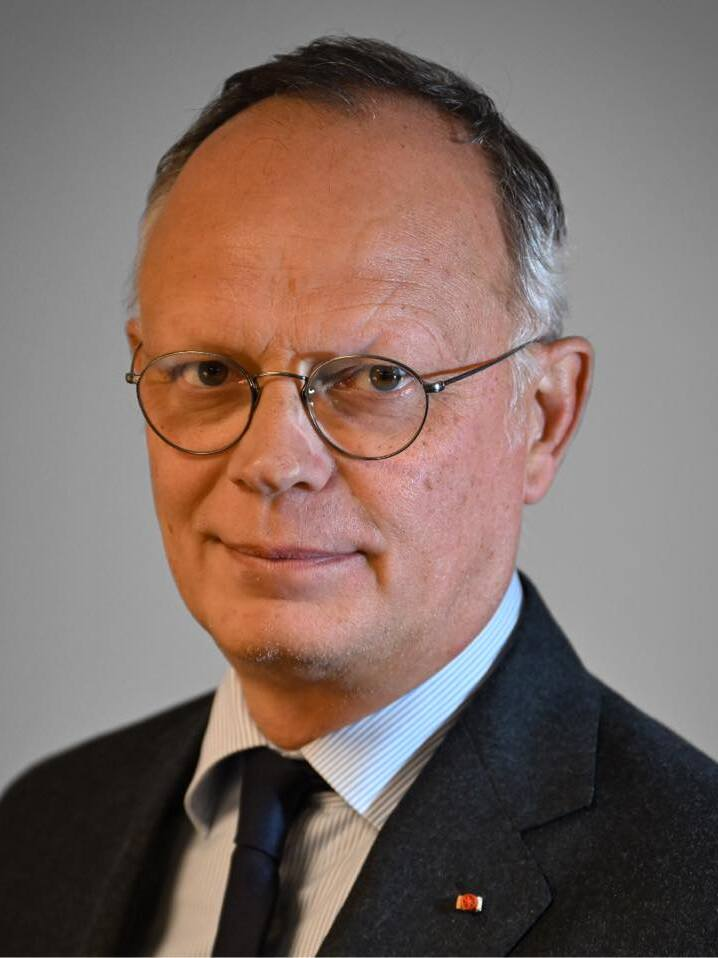
Former Prime Minister
Édouard Philippe
(2017–2020)

=== Union of the Right and Centre ===
- Gabriel Attal, Prime Minister of France (2024); Deputy (2017–2018; 2022; 2024–present); General Secretary of Renaissance (2024–present)
- David Lisnard (New Energy), Mayor of Cannes (2014–present); Departmental Councillor of Alpes-Maritimes (2008–present)
- Bruno Retailleau, Minister of State, Minister of the Interior (2024–2025); President of The Republicans (2025–present); Senator (2004–2024; 2025–present)
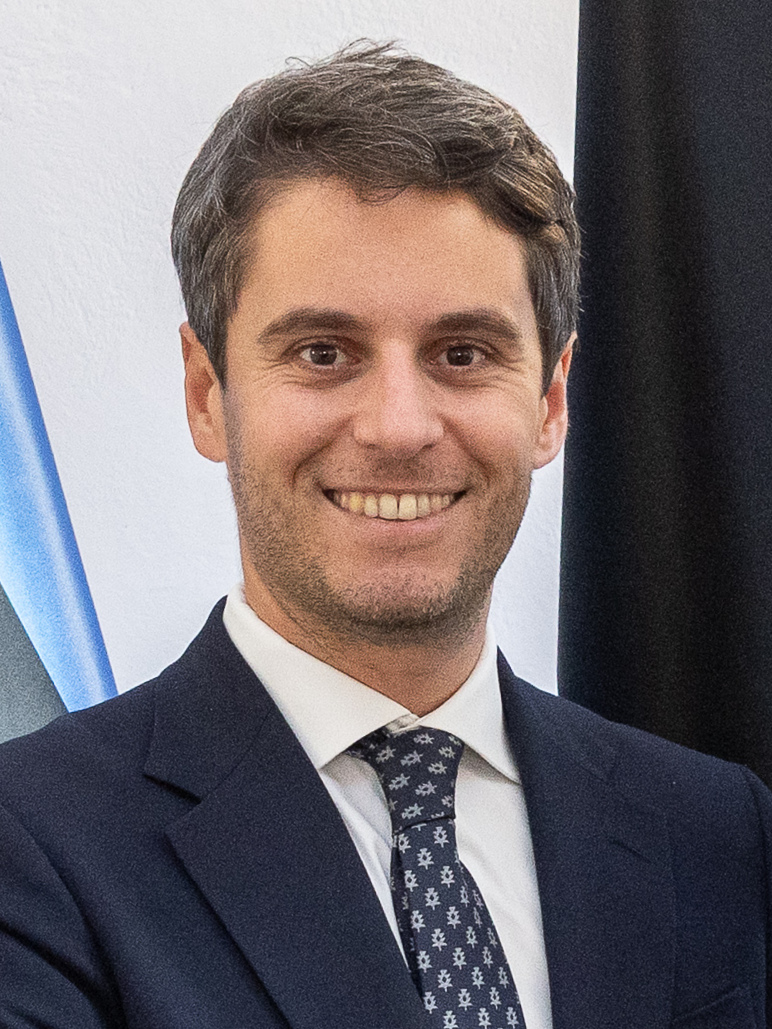
Former Prime Minister
Gabriel Attal
(2024)

Mayor of Cannes
David Lisnard
(2014–present)

Former Interior Minister
Bruno Retailleau
(2024–2025)

=== Socialist Party and Place Publique ===
- Raphaël Glucksmann, Member of the European Parliament (2019–present); co-president of Place Publique (2018–present) (Note: Although Glucksmann is a member of Place Publique, he participated in the joint Socialist Party–Place Publique primary, which selected him as the parties' common presidential candidate.)
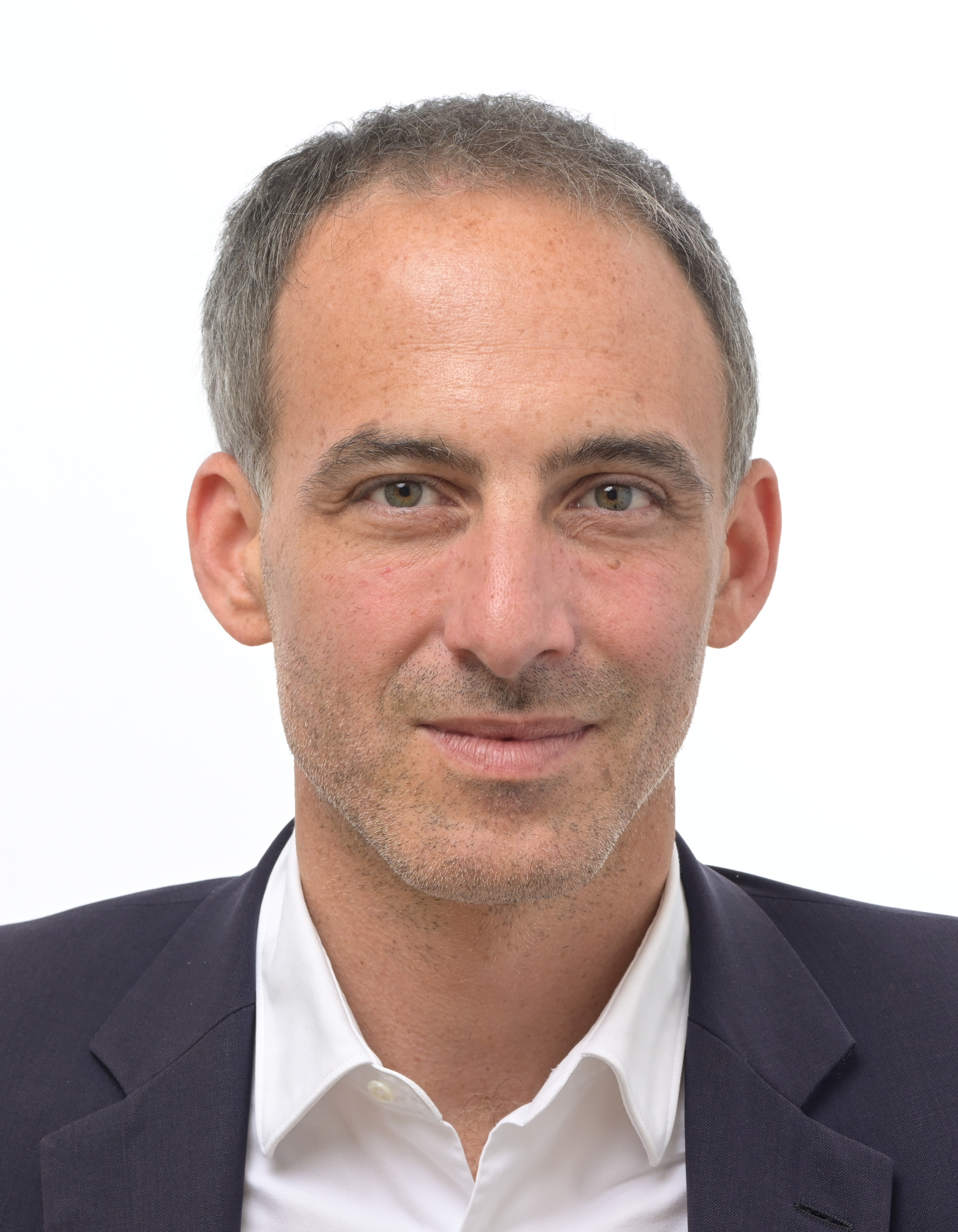
MEP
Raphaël Glucksmann
(2024–present)

=== La France Insoumise ===
- Jean-Luc Mélenchon, Deputy (2017–2022); MEP for France (2009–2017); Senator (1986-2000, 2004-2010); Minister delegate for vocational education (2000-2002); nominee in the 2012, 2017 and 2022 presidential elections
Former Deputy
Jean-Luc Mélenchon
(2017–2022)

=== The Ecologists ===
- Marine Tondelier, National Secretary of The Ecologists (2022–present); Member of the Regional Council of Hauts-de-France (2021–present); Member of the Council of Hémin-Carvin Aglomeration Community (2021–present); Member of the Hénin-Beaumont City Council
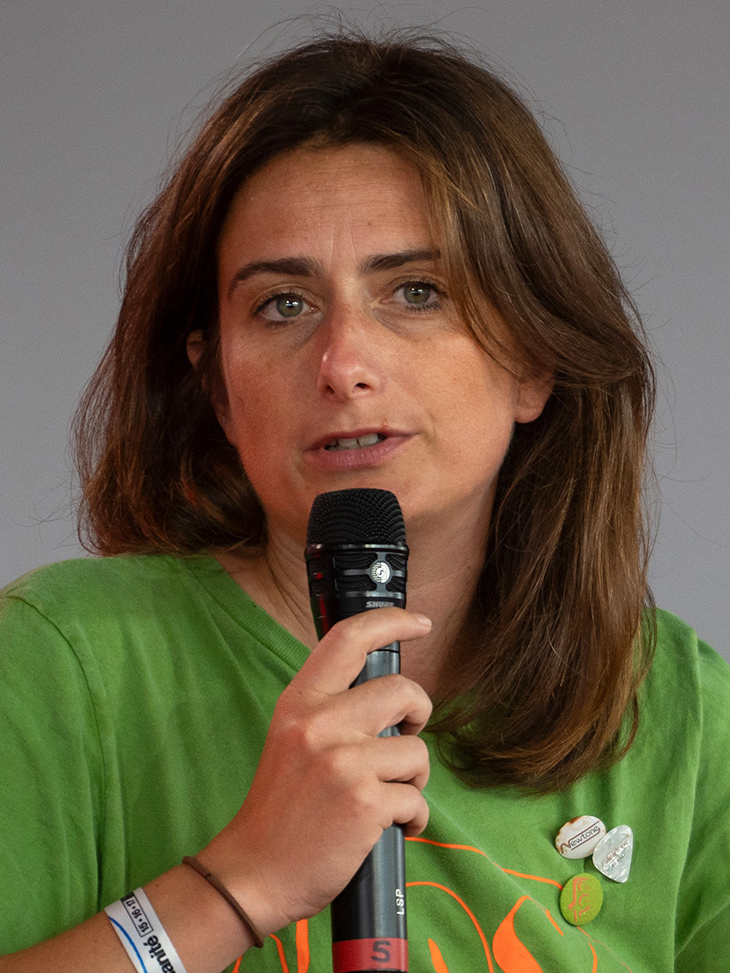
National Secretary of The Ecologists
Marine Tondelier
(2022–present)

=== Reconquête ===
- Éric Zemmour, President of Reconquête (2021–present); Reconquête nominee in the 2022 presidential election; journalist
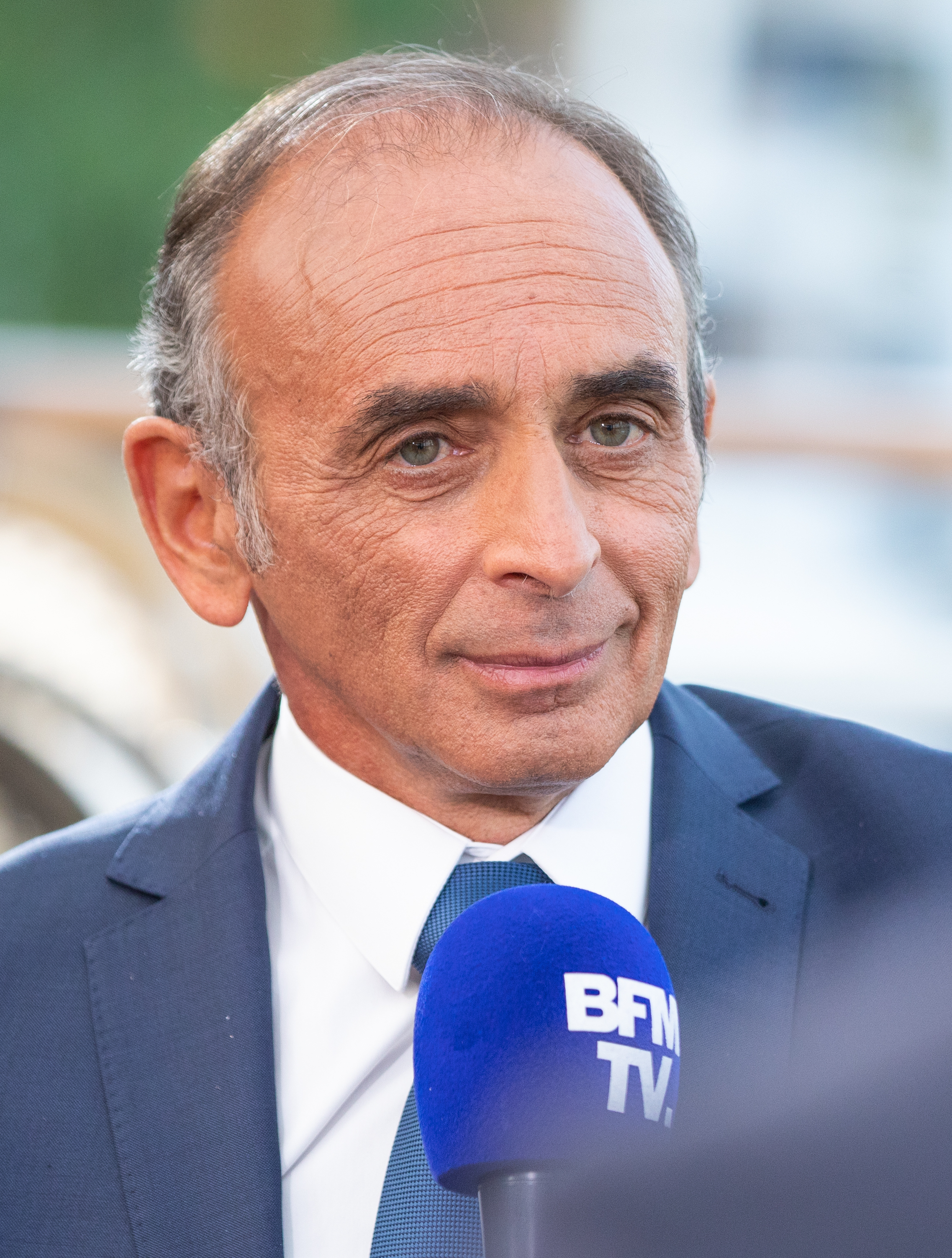
President
Éric Zemmour
of Reconquête
(2021–present)

=== French Communist Party ===
- Fabien Roussel, Secretary of the French Communist Party (2018–present); Mayor of Saint-Amand-les-Eaux (2025–present); Deputy (2017–2024)
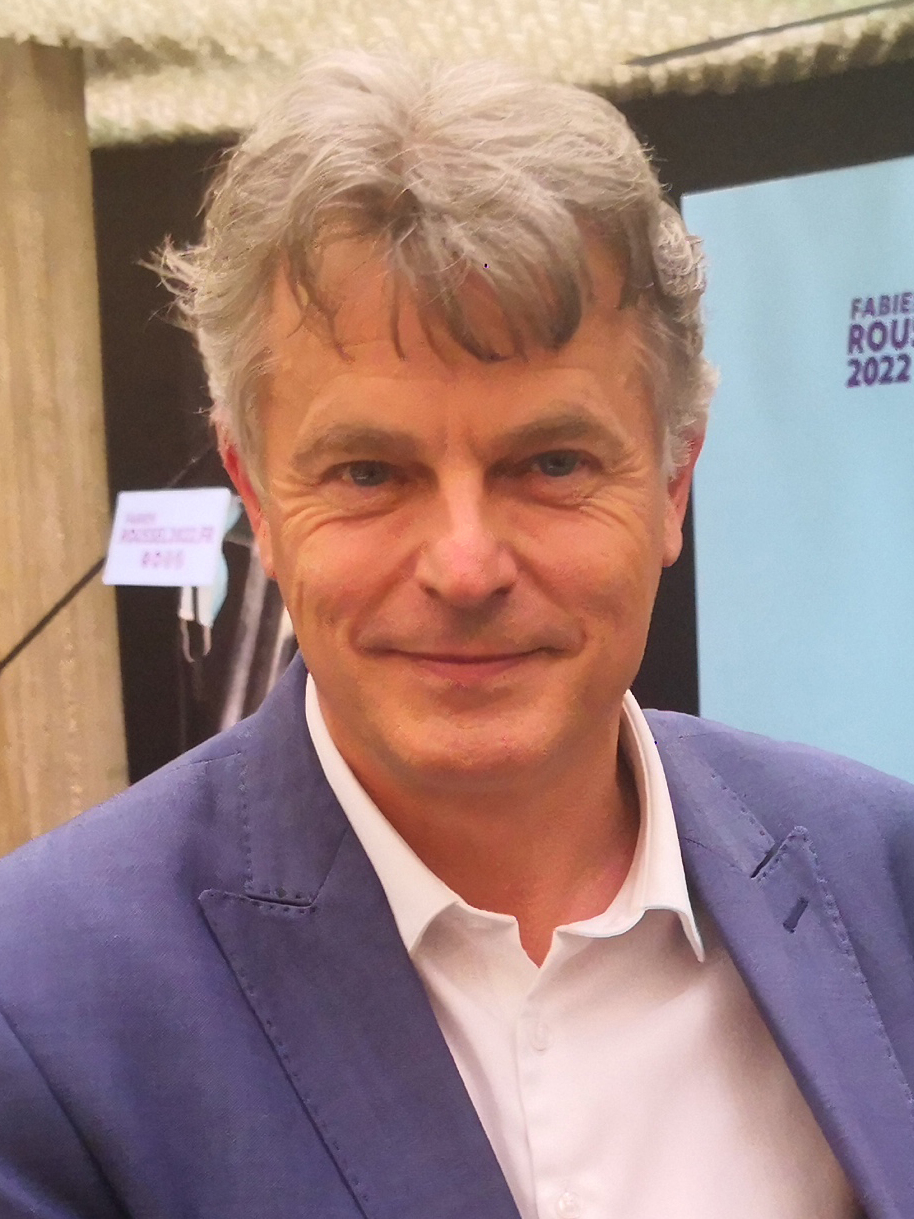
National Secretary
Fabien Roussel
of the French Communist Party
(2018–present)

=== Humanist France ===
- Dominique de Villepin, Prime Minister of France (2005–2007); leader of Humanist France (2025–present)
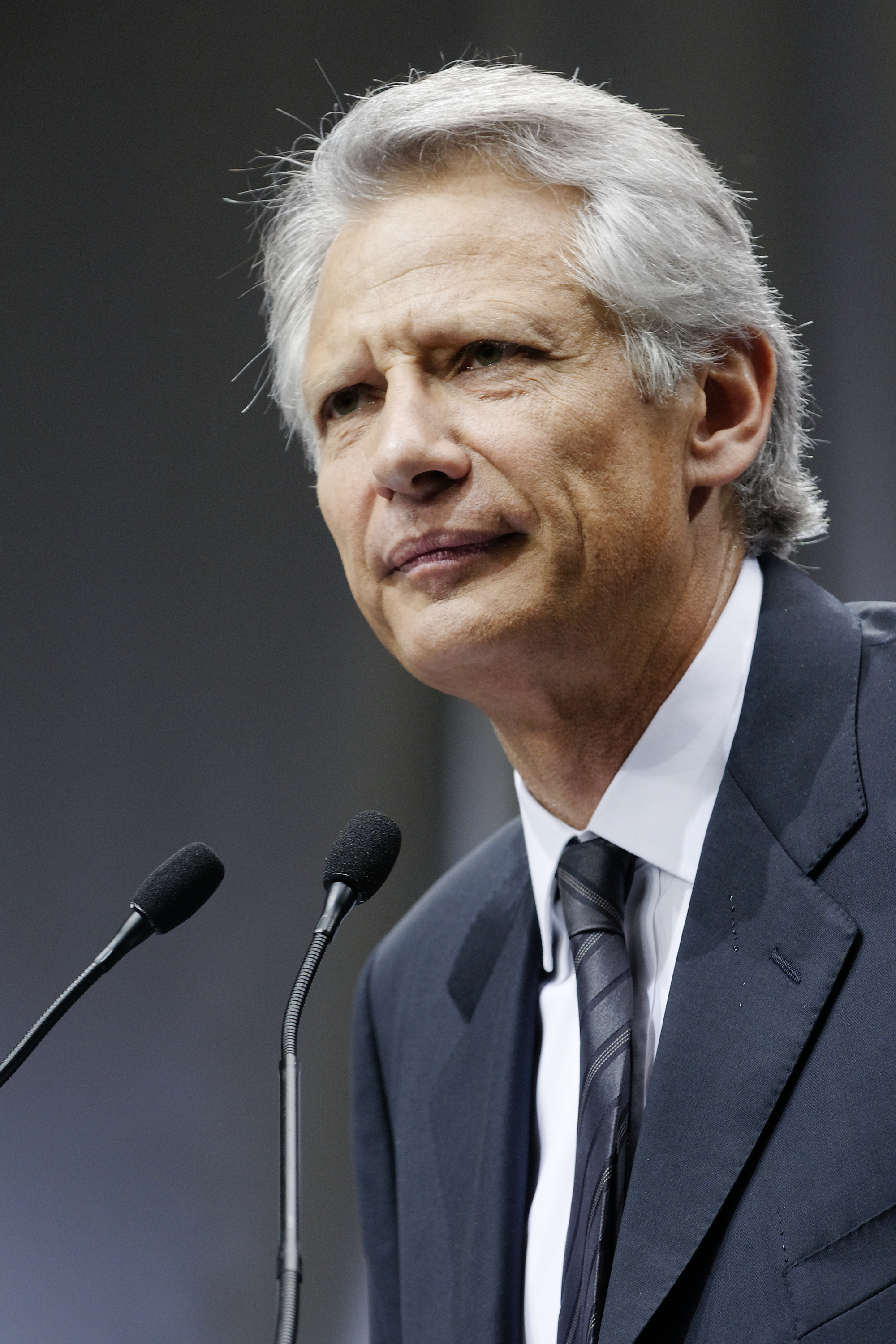
Former Prime Minister
Dominique de Villepin
(2005–2007)

=== Others ===
- Nathalie Arthaud (Lutte Ouvrière), Member of the Municipal Council of Vaulx-en-Velin (2008–2014), Spokesperson of LO (2008–)
- François Asselineau (Popular Republican Union), President of the Popular Republican Union (2007–present); Councillor of Paris (2000–2008)
- Delphine Batho (Ecology Generation), President of Ecology Generation (2018–present), Deputy (2013–present)
- Xavier Bertrand, President of the Regional Council of Hauts-de-France (2016–present); Deputy (2002–2016)
- Karim Bouamrane (Socialist Party), Mayor of Saint-Ouen-sur-Seine (2020–present)
- Nicolas Dupont-Aignan (Debout la France), President of Debout la France (2008–present); Municipal Councillor of Yerres (1995–present); Deputy (1997–2024)
- Jean-Michel Fauvergue (Independent), Deputy (2017–2022)
- Anasse Kazib (Révolution Permanente), far-left activist
- Selma Labib (New Anticapitalist Party), Spokesperson of the NPA
- Francis Lalanne (Independent), singer
- Florian Philippot (The Patriots), Member of the European Parliament (2014–2019), Vice President of National Rally (2012–2017)
- Natacha Polony (Independent), journalist, editor and public intellectual
- Teddy Riner (Independent), judoka, Olympic champion (2012, 2016, 2024)
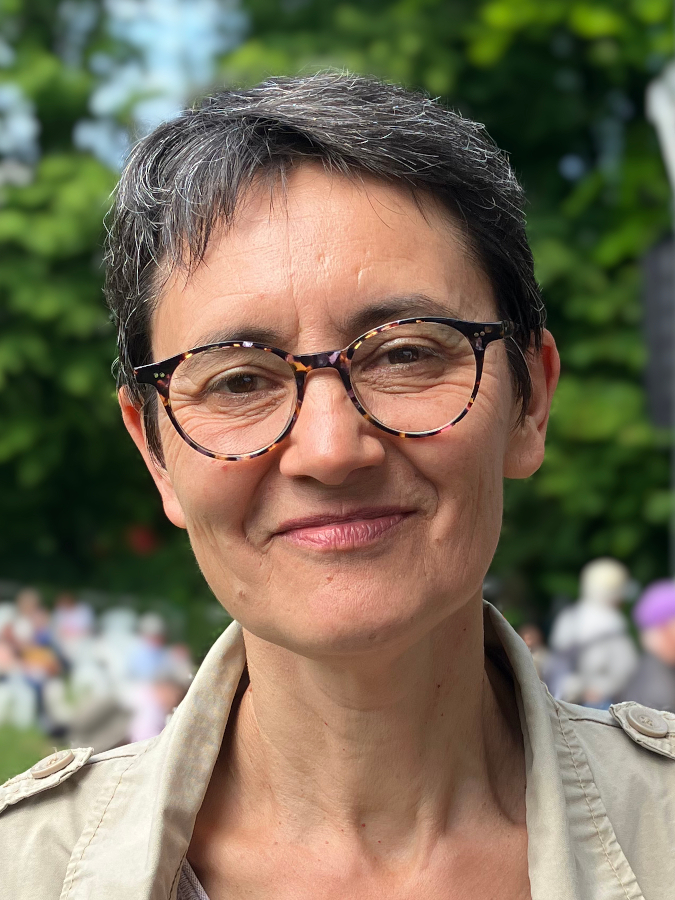
Spokesperson of Lutte Ouvrière
Nathalie Arthaud
(2008–present)

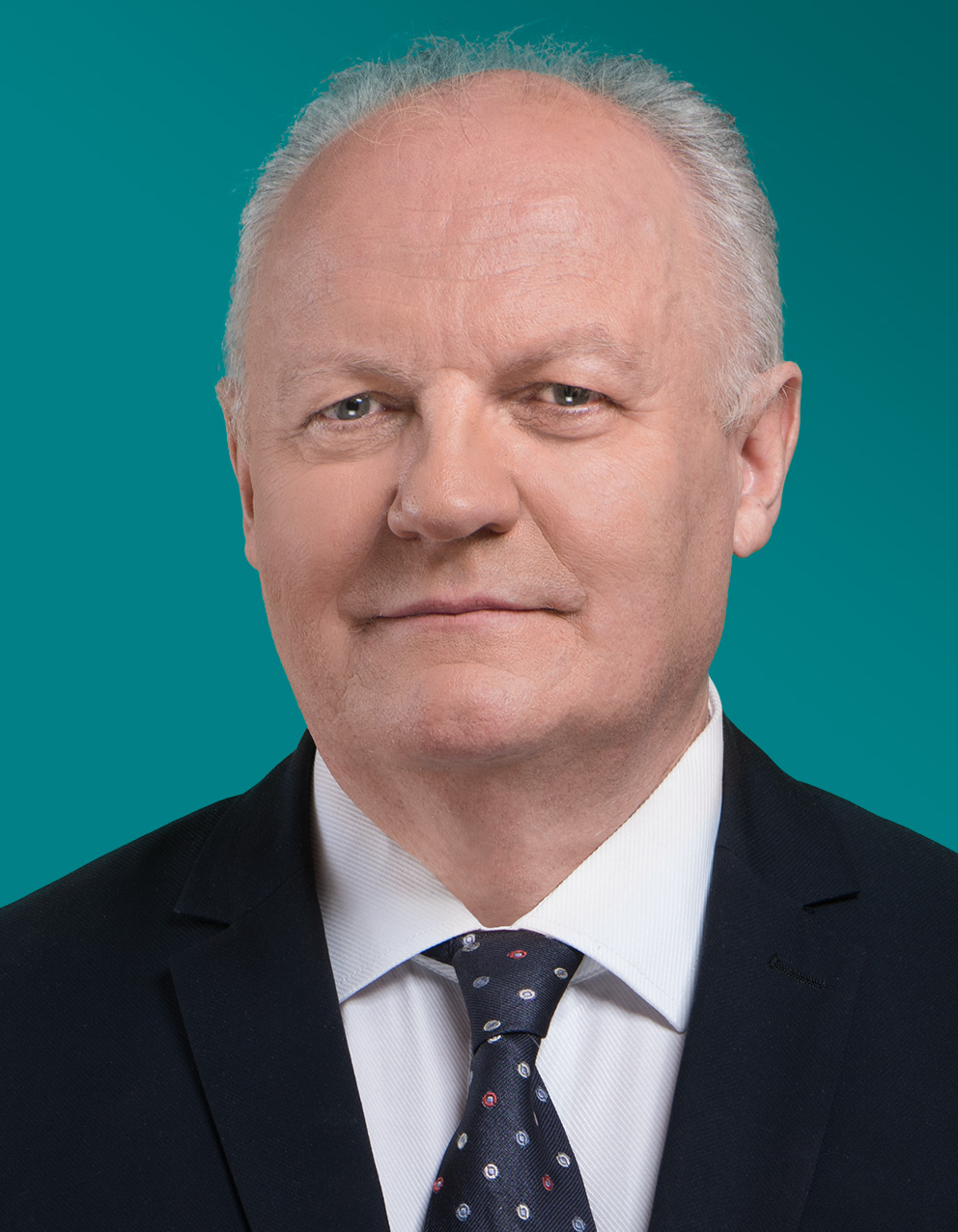
Former Councillor
François Asselineau
of Paris
(2001–2008)

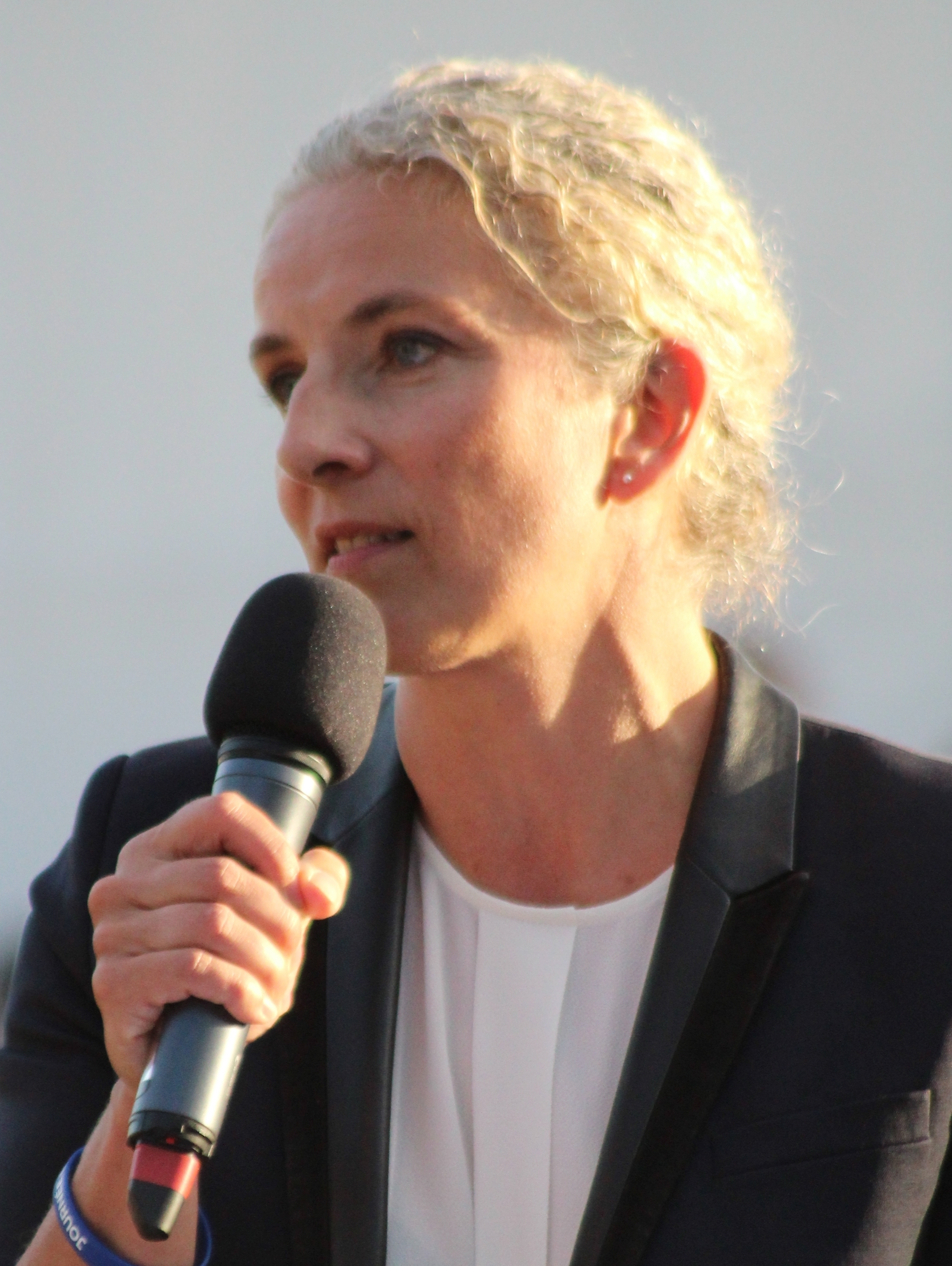
Deputy
Delphine Batho
(2013–present)

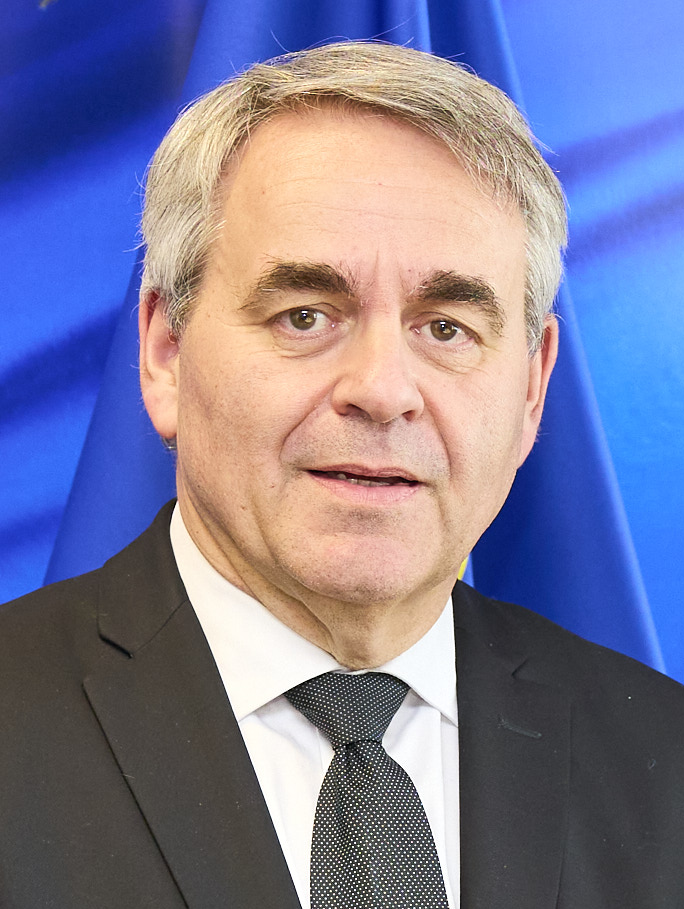
Regional Council President
Xavier Bertrand
of Hauts-de-France
(2016–present)

Mayor of Saint-Ouen-sur-Seine
Karim Bouamrane
(2020–present)

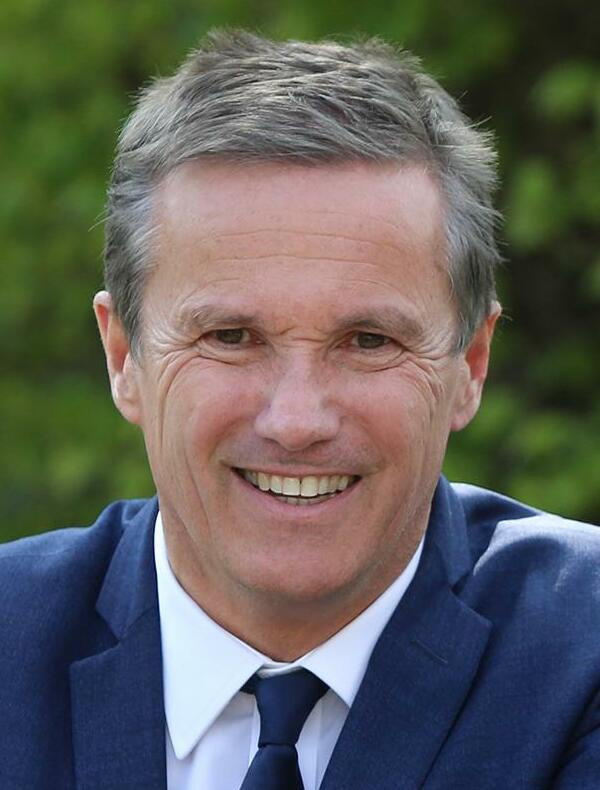
Former Deputy
Nicolas Dupont-Aignan
(1997–2024)

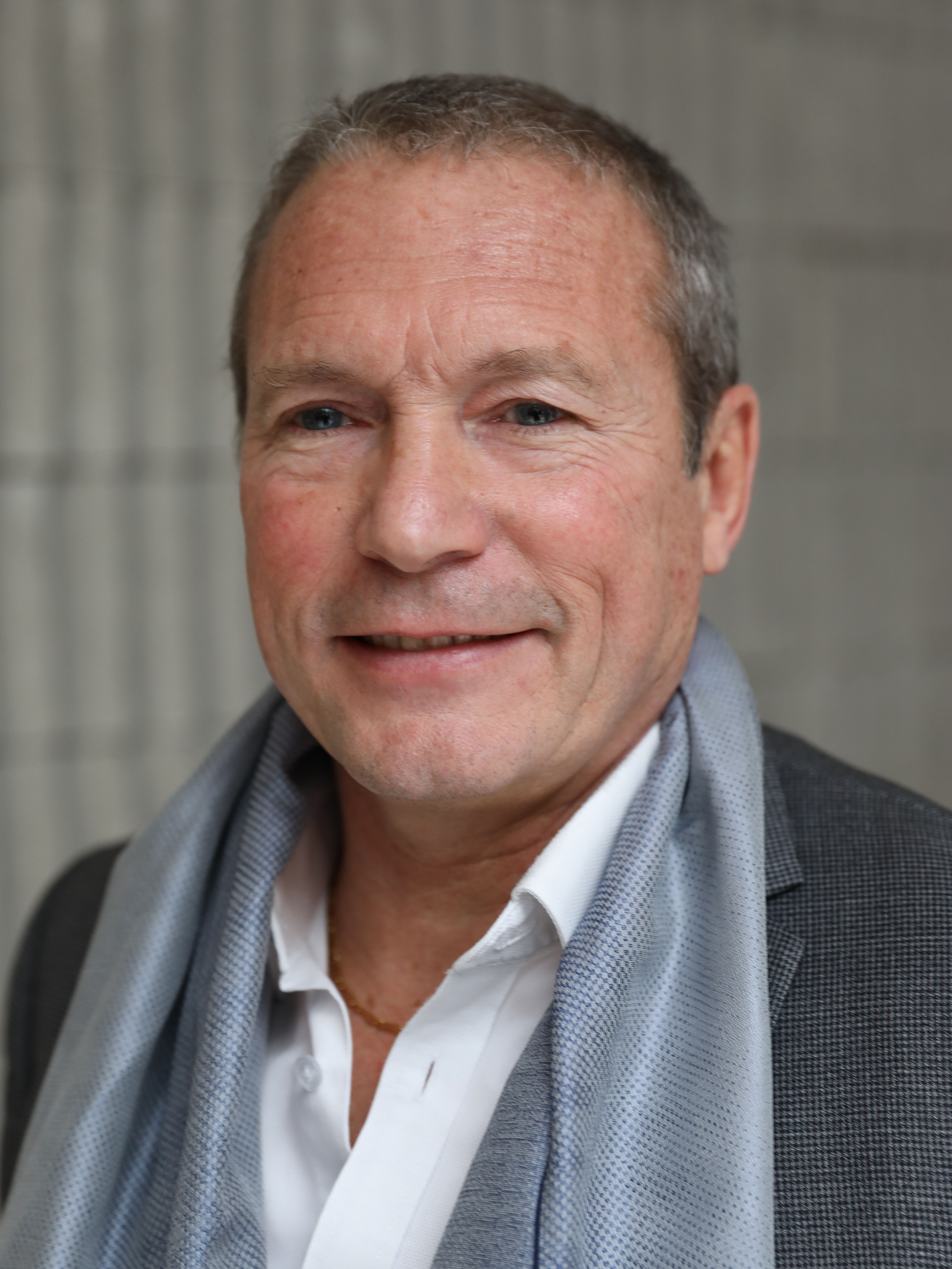
Former Deputy
Jean-Michel Fauvergue
(2017–2022)

Activist
Anasse Kazib

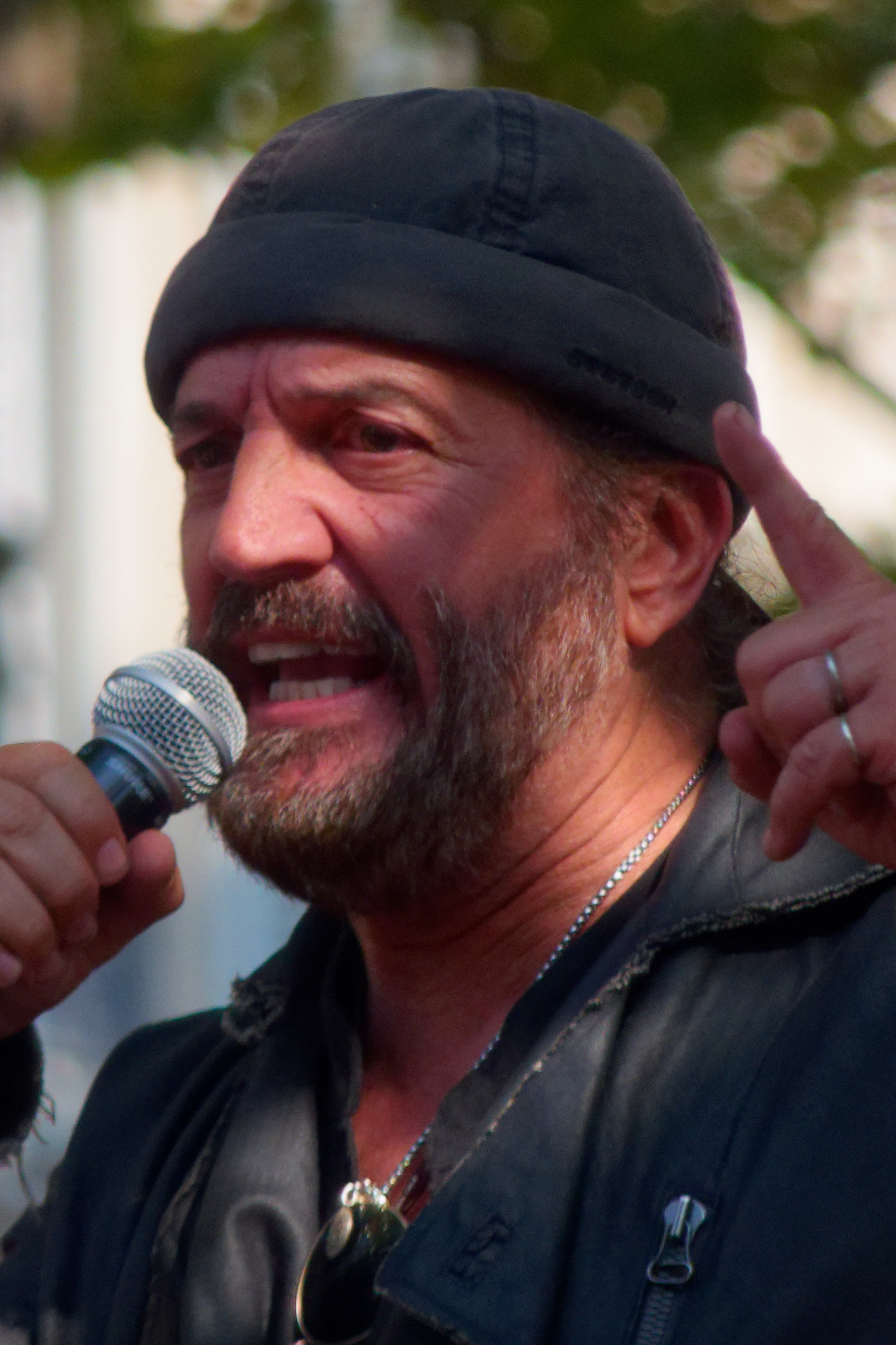
Singer
Francis Lalanne

Former MEP
Florian Philippot
(2014–2019)

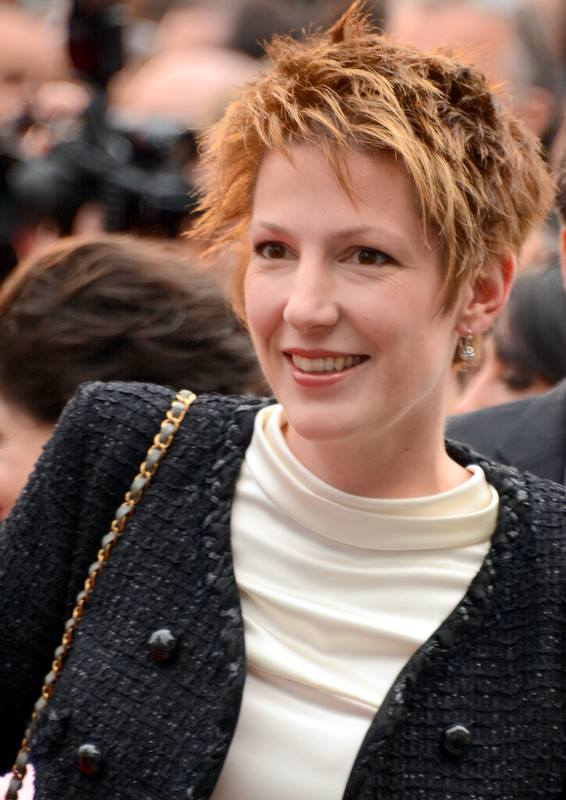
Journalist and editor
Natacha Polony

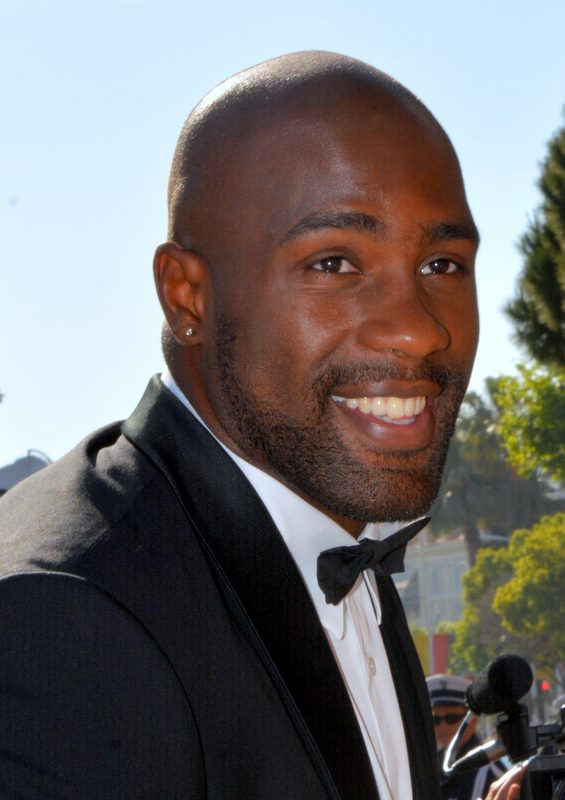
Judoka
Teddy Riner

== Potential candidates ==
=== The Republicans ===
- François Baroin, Mayor of Troyes (1995–)
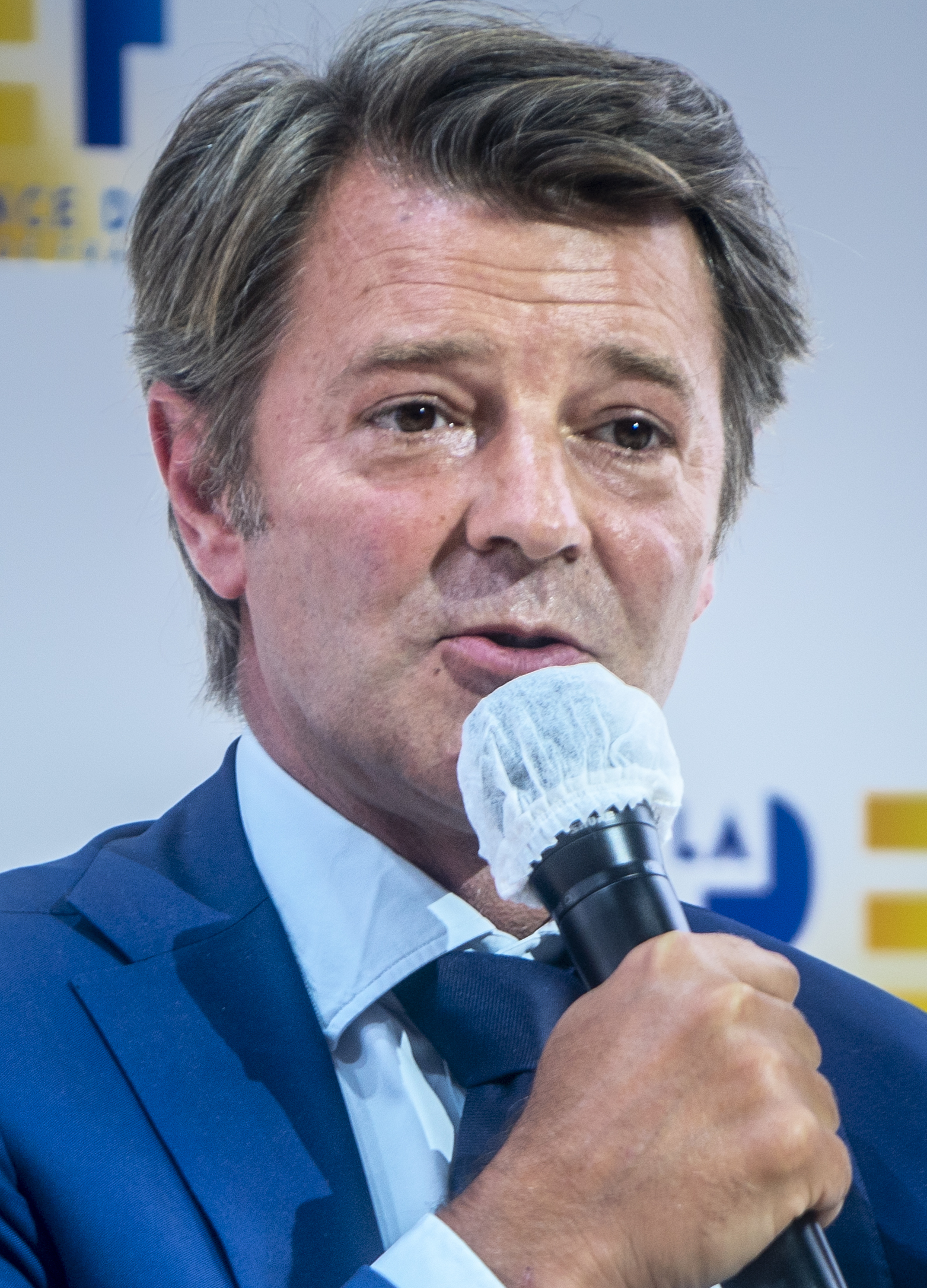
Mayor
François Baroin
of Troyes
(1995–present)

=== Renaissance ===
- Aurore Bergé, Minister for Gender Equality, Diversity and Equal Opportunities (2024; 2024–); President of the Renaissance group in the National Assembly (2022–2023); Deputy (2017–2023), Member of the Regional Council of Île-de-France (2021–)
- Élisabeth Borne, Prime Minister of France (2022–2024); Minister of National Education, Higher Education and Research, Minister of State (2024–2025); Deputy (2022; 2024–2025; 2025–present)
- Bruno Le Maire (Renaissance), Minister of Economics and Finance (2017–2024); Deputy for Eure's 1st constituency (2007–2009; 2012–2017; 2017) (has said he will give his answer in October)
- Manuel Valls, Prime Minister of France (2014–2016); Minister of State, Minister of the Overseas (2024–2025)
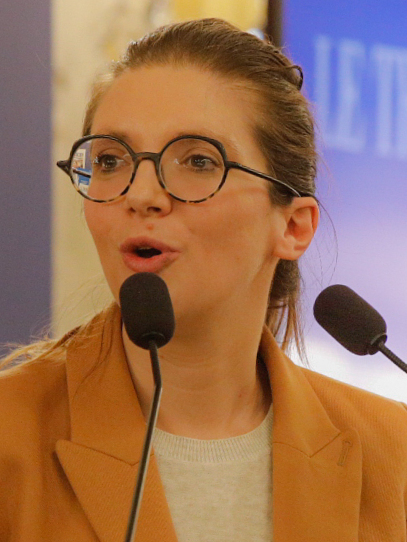
Gender Equality Minister
Aurore Bergé
(2024; 2024–present)

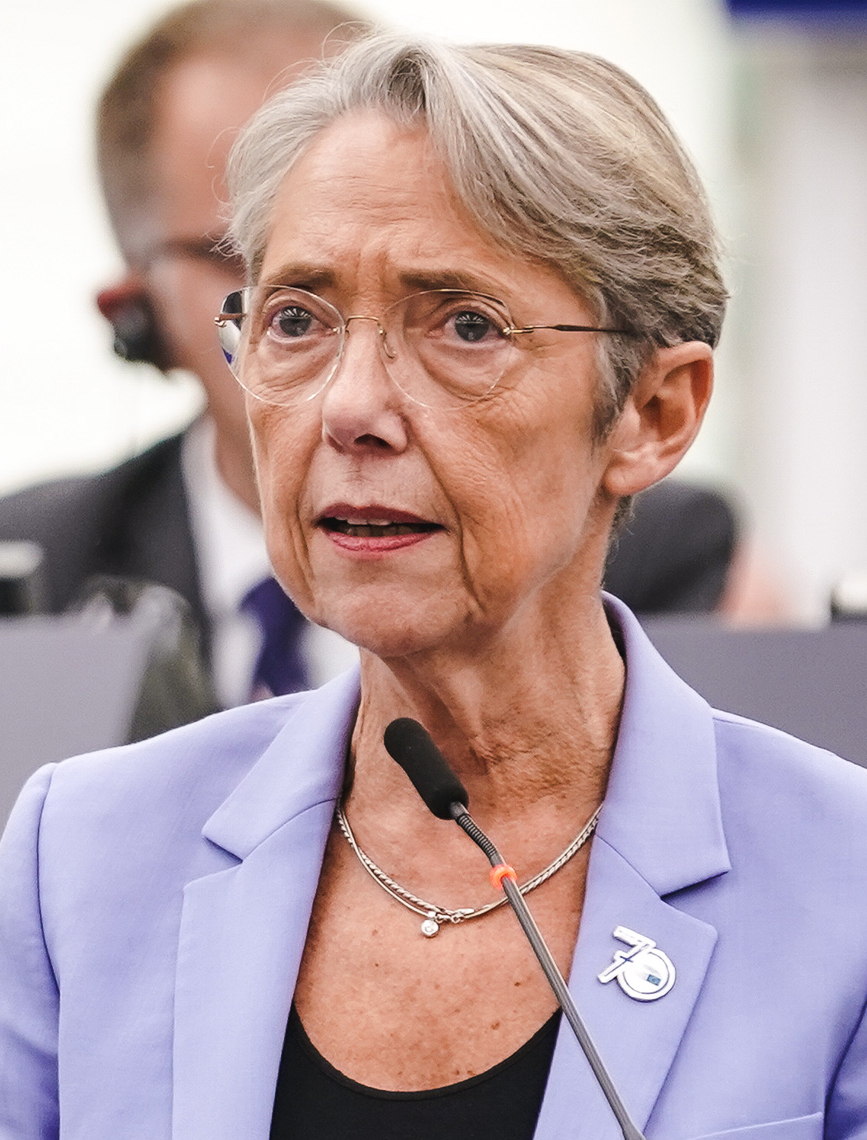
Former Prime Minister
Élisabeth Borne
(2022–2024)

Former Economy Minister
Bruno Le Maire
(2017–2024)

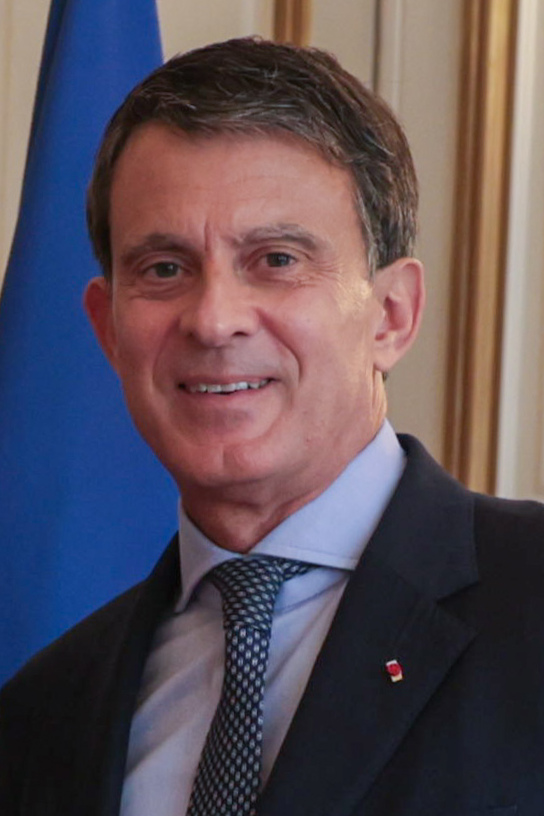
Former Prime Minister
Manuel Valls
(2014–2016)

=== Socialist Party ===
- François Hollande, President of France (2012–2017); Deputy (1988–1993; 1997–2012; 2024–present); First Secretary of the Socialist Party (1997–2008) (has said he will state his intentions in December; positioned as a fallback if the social-democratic nominee fails to build momentum)
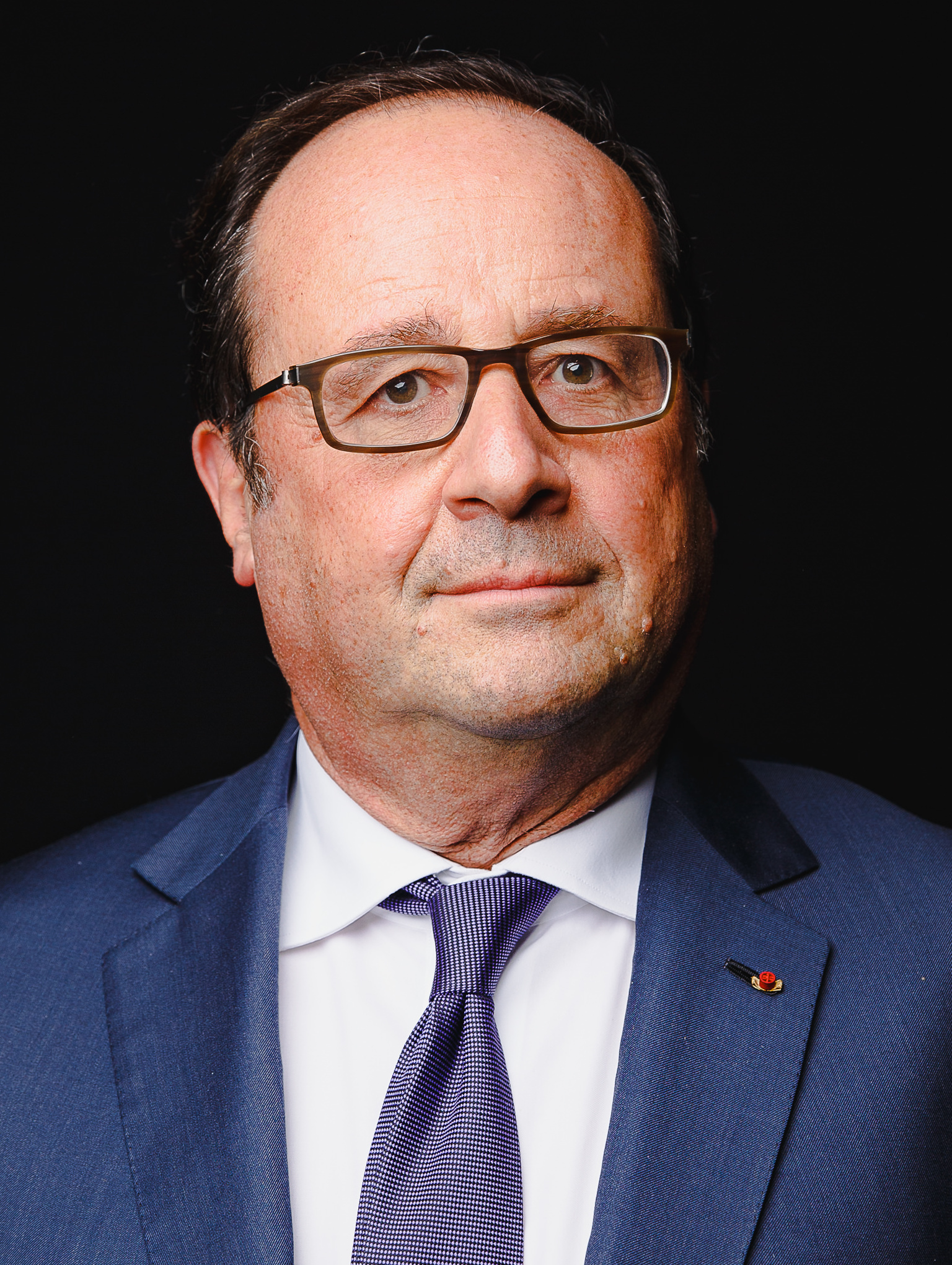
Former President
François Hollande
(2012–2017)

== Declined to be candidates ==
=== Far-left ===
- Philippe Poutou (New Anticapitalist Party), Municipal Councillor of Bordeaux (2020–2026); (endorsed Jean-Luc Mélenchon)

=== Centre-left and left-wing ===
- Clémentine Autain (L'Après), Deputy (2017–present)
- Bernard Cazeneuve (La Convention), Prime Minister of France (2016–2017); Deputy for Manche's 4th constituency (2012; 2017); Deputy for Manche's 5th constituency (1997–2002; 2007–2012) (endorsed Raphaël Glucksmann)
- Lucie Castets (Independent), Mayor of the 12th arrondissement of Paris (2026–present) and Member of the Council of Paris (2026–present)
- Carole Delga, President of the Regional Council of Occitania (2016–present); Deputy (2012–2014; 2015–2017) (endorsed Raphaël Glucksmann)
- Benjamin Lucas-Lundy (Génération.s), Deputy for Yvelines' 8th constituency (2022–present)
- François Ruffin (Debout!), President of Debout! (2025–present); Deputy (2017–present)

=== Centre ===
- François Bayrou (Democratic Movement), Prime Minister of France (2024–2025); President of the Democratic Movement (2007–present); Mayor of Pau (2014–2026)
- Yaël Braun-Pivet (Renaissance), President of the National Assembly of France (2022–present); Deputy for Yvelines's 5th constituency (2017–present)
- Jean Castex, Prime Minister of France (2020–2022); Chairman and CEO of SNCF (2025–present); Chairman and CEO of RATP (2022–2025); Mayor of Prades (2008–2020)
- Gérald Darmanin, Keeper of the Seals, Minister of State, Minister of Justice (2024–present); Deputy (2012–2016; 2022; 2024–2025) (endorsed Édouard Philippe)
- Sébastien Lecornu (Renaissance), Prime Minister of France (2025–present)

=== Centre-right and right-wing ===
- Michel Barnier, Prime Minister of France (2024); MEP for Île-de-France (2009–2010) (endorsed Bruno Retailleau; leads the cross-party "Bâtir ensemble 2027" unity initiative)
- Christine Lagarde, President of the European Central Bank (2009–present)
- Valérie Pécresse, President of the Regional Council of Île-de-France (2015–present); The Republicans nominee in the 2022 presidential election; Deputy (2002–2007; 2012–2016) (endorsed Bruno Retailleau)
- Laurent Wauquiez (The Republicans), President of the Regional Council of Auvergne-Rhône-Alpes (2016–2024); Deputy for Haute-Loire's 1st constituency (2004–2007; 2012–2017; 2024–present); President of The Republicans (2017–2019) (endorsed Édouard Philippe)

=== Far-right ===
- Éric Ciotti (Union of the Right for the Republic), Deputy for Alpes-Maritimes's 1st constituency (2007–present); Mayor of Nice (2026–present); President of The Republicans (2022–2024) (endorsed Marine Le Pen)
- Sarah Knafo (Reconquête), MEP for France (2024–present) (endorsed her partner, Éric Zemmour; ran for mayor of Paris in 2026)
- Marion Maréchal (Identity–Liberties), MEP for France (2024–present); Deputy for Vaucluse's 3rd constituency (2012–2017) (endorsed her aunt, Marine Le Pen)

=== Independent ===
- Robert Ménard, Mayor of Béziers (2014–present)
- Cyril Hanouna, television presenter

== Endorsements ==
Gabriel Attal

National political figures

- Anne Genetet, Deputy and former Minister of National Education
- Nathalie Loiseau, Deputy and former Minister delegate in charge of European Affairs
- Agnès Pannier-Runacher, Deputy and former Ministry of Ecological Transition (France)
- Franck Riester, President of Agir and former Minister delegate in charge of Foreign Trade
- Prisca Thevenot, Deputy and former Government spokesperson

Local political figures

- Antoine Armand, Mayor of Annecy and former Minister of Economics and Finance
- Thomas Cazenave, Mayor of Bordeaux
Raphaël Glucksmann

Party leaders

- Olivier Faure, Deputy and First secretary of the Socialist party (PS), contender in the Socialist Party presidential primary
- Aurore Lalucq, Member of the European Parliament and Place Publique co-spokesperson (with Raphaël Glucksmann)
- Emmanuel Maurel, Deputy and National co-coordinator of the Republican and Socialist Left, , contender in the Socialist Party presidential primary

National political figures

- Laurence Rossignol, Senator, former Minister for Families, Children and Women's Rights
- Aurélien Rousseau, Deputy, former Minister of Health and Prevention
- Boris Vallaud, Deputy and President of the Socialists group in the National Assembly
- Patrick Kanner, Senator and President of the Socialist group in the Senate
- Yannick Jadot, Senator and The Ecologists candidate in the 2022 Presidential Election
- Jerôme Guedj, Deputy, contender in the Socialist Party presidential primary
- Marie-Noëlle Lienemann, former Minister, former senator and Member of the European Parliament

Local political figures

- Michaël Delafosse, Mayor of Montpellier
- Lamia El Aaraje, First Deputy-mayor of Paris
- Emmanuel Grégoire, Mayor of Paris
- Anne Hidalgo, former Mayor of Paris and Socialist party (PS) candidate in the 2022 Presidential Election
- Mathieu Klein, Mayor of Nancy
- Nicolas Mayer-Rossignol, Mayor of Rouen and runner-up of the 2023 and 2025 Secretary-General elections of the PS
- Johanna Rolland, Mayor of Nantes
Marine Le Pen

Party leaders

- Jordan Bardella, Member of the European Parliament and president of the National Rally (RN)
- Nicolas Battini, President of Mossa Palatina (co-endorsed Bardella)
- Éric Ciotti, Mayor of Nice and president of Union of the Right for the Republic
- Marion Maréchal, Member of the European Parliament and president of Identity–Liberties (her niece)
- Jean-Philippe Tanguy, Deputy and national coordinator of L'Avenir Français

National political figures

- Sébastien Chenu, Vice-President of the National Assembly and president of the National Rally group in the National Assembly
- Hélène Laporte, Vice-President of the National Assembly
- Edwige Diaz, Senator and president of the National Union for Territories group in the Senate
- Charles Alloncle, deputy
- Philippe Olivier, Member of the European Parliament (Le Pen's brother-in-law)

Local political figures

- Louis Aliot, Mayor of Perpignan, Vice-president of the National Rally (RN) (Le Pen's former partner)
- Alexandra Masson, Mayor of Menton, former deputy

International figures

- Elon Musk (endorsement rejected by RN)
David Lisnard
- Patrick Sébastien, singer, media personality
- Willy Sagnol, footballer, former member of the France national team
Jean-Luc Mélenchon

Party leaders

- Philippe Poutou, Spokesman of New Anticapitalist Party and candidate in the 2012, 2017 and 2022 Presidential Elections
- Olivier Besancenot, Spokesman of New Anticapitalist Party and candidate in the 2002 and 2007 Presidential Elections
- Manuel Bompard, Deputy and Coordinator of La France Insoumise
- Christian Tein, President of the Kanak and Socialist National Liberation Front
- Emmanuel Tjibaou, Member of Parliament and president of the Caledonian Union

National political figures

- Younous Omarjee, Vice-President of the European Parliament
- Clémence Guetté, Vice-President of the National Assembly
- Nadège Abomangoli, Vice-President of the National Assembly
- Stéphane Peu, Deputy and President of the Democratic and Republican Left group in the National Assembly
- Mathilde Panot, Deputy and President of the La France Insoumise – New Popular Front group in the National Assembly
- Manon Aubry, Member of the European Parliament and co-chair of the The Left group in the European Parliament
- Rima Hassan, Member of the European Parliament and Pro-Palestine activist

Local political figures

- Bally Bagayoko, Mayor of Saint-Denis
- David Guiraud, Mayor of Roubaix

Other national figures

- Annie Ernaux, author, winner of 2022 Nobel Prize in Literature
- Robert Guédiguian, filmmaker and producer
- Pierre Lemaitre, author, screenwriter, winner of Prix Goncourt 2013
- Lujipeka, rapper
- Médine, rapper
- Anna Mouglalis, actress
- Rohff, rapper
- Zaho de Sagazan, singer-songwriter, musician
- SDM, rapper
- Youssef Swatts, rapper
- Tiakola, rapper
- Theodora, singer-songwriter
- Yann Tiersen, musician, composer
- Eric Vuillard, writer, film director, winner of Prix Goncourt 2017

International figures

- Hasan Piker, American political commentator and campaigner
Édouard Philippe

Executive officials

- Maud Bregeon, Spokesperson of the Government of France
- Gérald Darmanin, Keeper of the Seals, Minister of Justice
- Mathieu Lefèvre, Minister delegate for Relations with Parliament

National political figures

- Laurent Wauquiez, President of the Republican Right group in the National Assembly, former Minister, former President of the Auvergne-Rhône-Alpes Regional Council and former President of The Republicans party
- Christophe Béchu, former Minister of Ecological transition, former Mayor of Angers
- Christian Estrosi, former Minister, former Mayor of Nice
- Marie Guévenoux, former Minister of the Overseas
- Nathalie Kosciusko-Morizet, former Minister for ecology and former deputy

Local political figures

- Franck Leroy, President of the Regional Council of Grand-Est, former mayor of Épernay
- Christelle Morançais, President of the Regional Council of Pays de la Loire
- Maël de Calan, President of the Departemental Council of Finistère
- Christian Poiret, President of the Departemental Counicl of Nord
- Jérôme Baloge, Mayor of Niort
- Victor Bonnot, Mayor of Saint-Brieuc
- Guillaume Boudy, Mayor of Suresnes
- Patrick de Carolis, Mayor of Arles, journalist and former president of France Télévisions (2005-2010)
- Arnaud Péricard, Mayor of Saint-Germain-en-Laye
- Boris Ravignon, Mayor of Charleville-Mézières
- Arnaud Robinet, Mayor of Reims
- Ladislas Vergne, Mayor of Chartres
Bruno Retailleau
- Michel Barnier, former Prime Minister of France
- Valérie Pécresse, President of the Regional Council of Île-de-France
Éric Zemmour
- Sarah Knafo, Member of the European Parliament (Zemmour's partner)

== Opinion polling ==
Local regression of polls conducted between the 2022 and 2027 presidential elections.

Local regression of polls conducted since September 2024.

== See also ==
- President of France
- Politics of France
- French presidential elections under the Fifth Republic
- Next French legislative election
