= 2026 French Socialist Party presidential primary =

French presidential nomination contest

- 9–11 October 2026
- Registered: 140,282
- Turnout: 85.96%
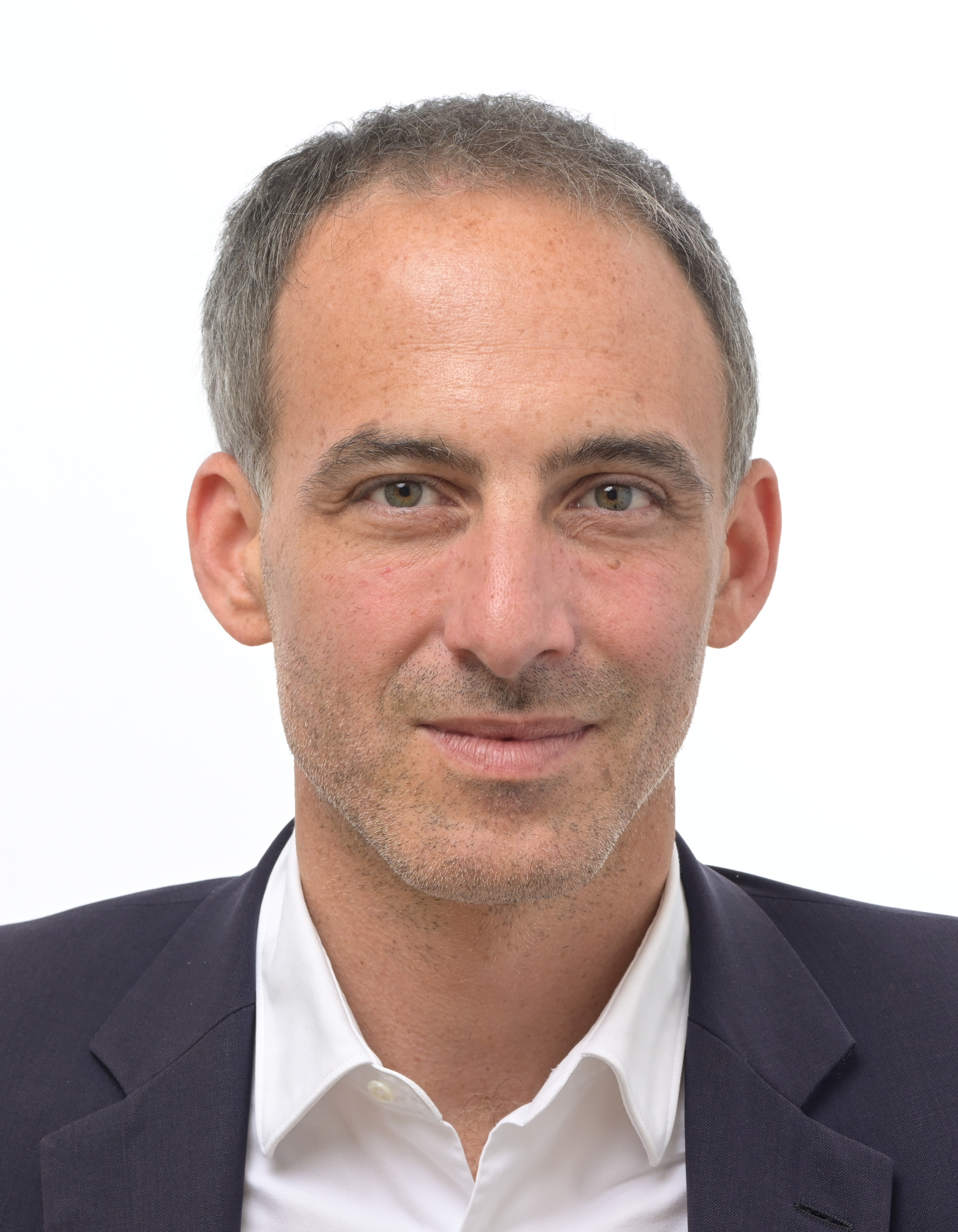

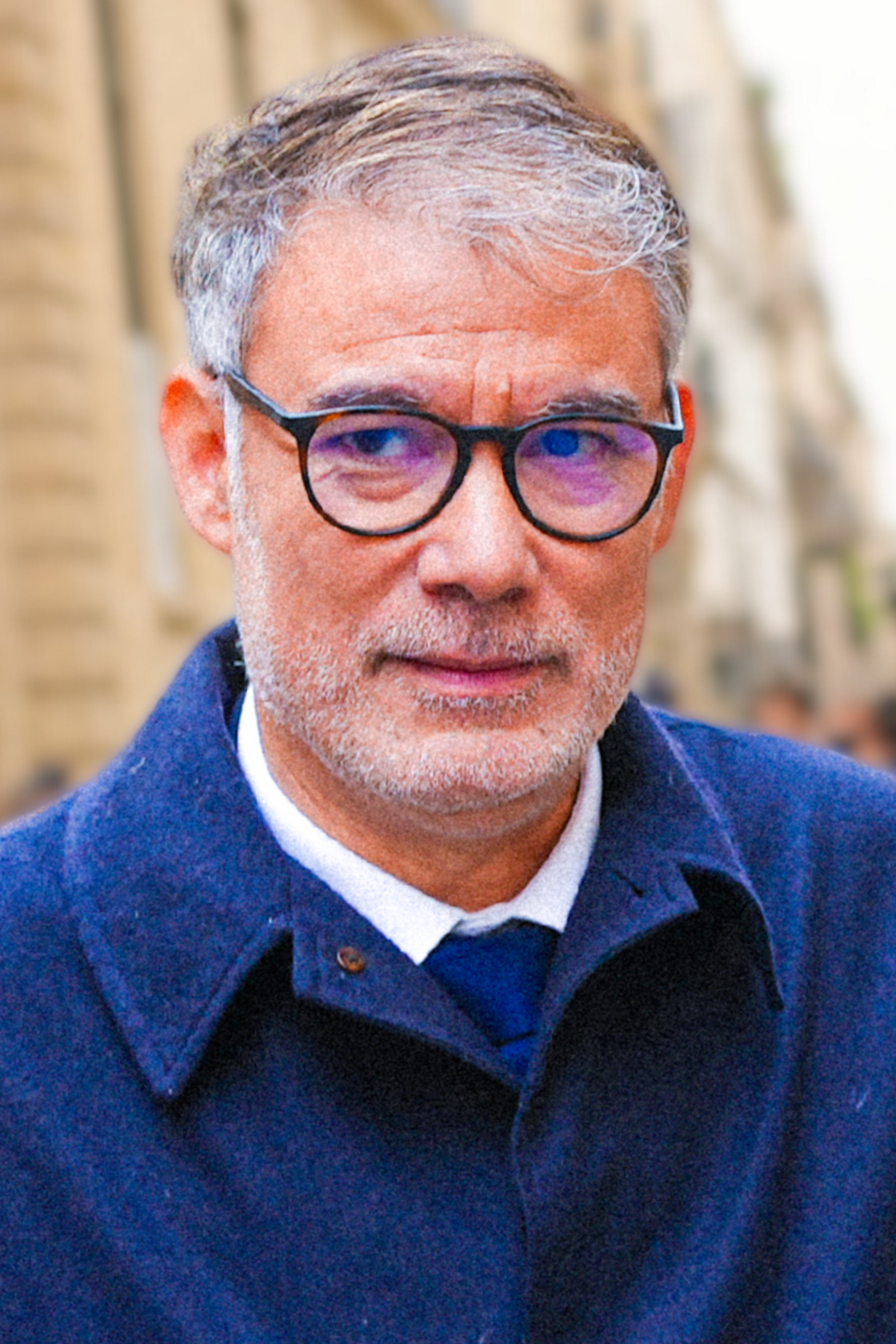

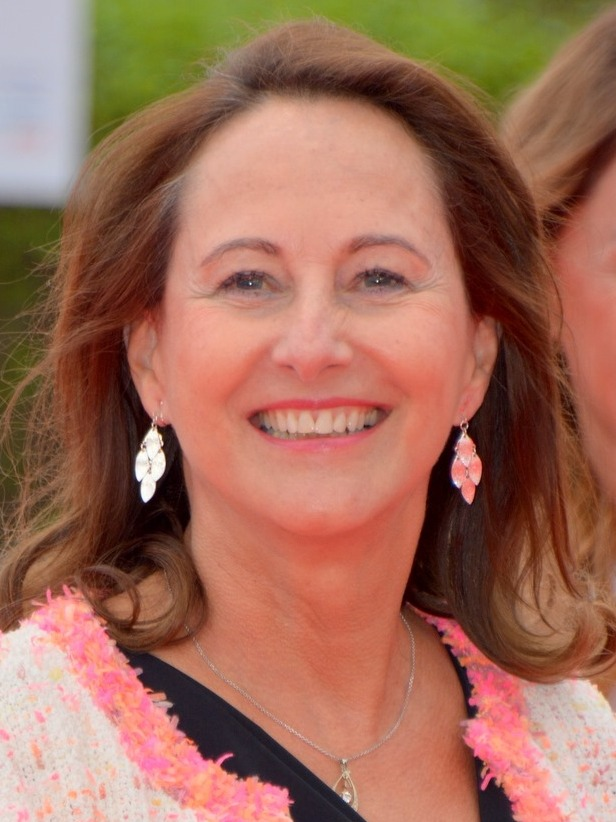

Candidate	Raphaël Glucksmann	Olivier Faure	Ségolène Royal
Party	Place Publique	PS	PS
Popular vote	79,613	17,398	9,165
Percentage	66.13%	14.48%	7.62%
Candidate	Emmanuel Maurel	Jérôme Guedj
Party	GRS	PS
Popular vote	7,119	7,012
Percentage	5.92%	5.83%
Previous Presidential nominee
Anne Hidalgo
PS
Presidential nominee
Raphaël Glucksmann
Place Publique

The 2026 French Socialist Party presidential primary was a primary election held online from 9 to 11 October 2026 to select a common candidate backed by the Socialist Party (PS), Place Publique (PP) and the Republican and Socialist Left (GRS) for the 2027 French presidential election. Raphaël Glucksmann won in the first round with 66.13% of the vote, making the second round scheduled for 16–17 October unnecessary.

The contest resulted from a 9 July vote in which 55.5% of PS members chose a separate, member-based selection process over First Secretary Olivier Faure's proposal for a broader, €2 primary linked to the separate United Left primary. Although consequently described in reporting as a closed primary, the final rules also allowed non-members to enrol through an associated social-democratic body and pay a participation fee.

Five candidates contested the primary: Glucksmann, Faure, Ségolène Royal, Emmanuel Maurel and Jérôme Guedj. Voting had originally been scheduled to end on 10 October, but was extended to 18:00 on 11 October after a cyberattack disrupted access to the voting platform.

== Background ==
=== The Socialist Party after 2022 ===
The PS selected Paris mayor Anne Hidalgo in its 2021 primary. In the first round of the 2022 French presidential election, she received 1.75% of the vote, the party's lowest-ever presidential result. The party subsequently took part in the left-wing New Ecological and Social People's Union and New Popular Front alliances, while remaining divided over whether cooperation with La France Insoumise (LFI) should extend to the 2027 presidential election.

In November 2025, Faure was among the figures who launched a separate project for a broad United Left primary. Place Publique declined to participate in that process, while LFI was not among its organisers. The PS postponed its final decision until after the 2026 municipal elections and then put two competing strategies to a membership vote.

=== Internal consultation ===
On 9 July 2026, PS members chose between two proposals. The party leadership's proposal would have created an open electorate of members and sympathisers paying €2, followed by participation in the United Left primary. A rival proposal called for a separate vote restricted principally to members of a social-democratic bloc. The latter won 55.5% to 44.5%, ending the PS's planned participation in the United Left contest scheduled for 11 October.

Both proposals envisaged that the eventual nominee would seek a common programme, a legislative-election agreement and a governing agreement with other parties of the democratic, ecological and republican left. The result was nevertheless viewed as a defeat for Faure, who had advocated the broader process.

=== Agreement between the participating parties ===
On 25 August, the PS National Council approved an agreement with Place Publique by 159 votes to 32, with 21 abstentions; Place Publique approved the same text unanimously. The GRS, represented nationally by Maurel and Marie-Noëlle Lienemann, joined the process the following day. The agreement retained a provision allowing other parties to join, subject to accepting the rules and common charter.

== Procedure ==
=== Timetable and voting ===
Key dates
Date	Event
9 July 2026	PS membership consultation on the method of selecting a presidential candidate
25–26 August 2026	PS and Place Publique ratified the agreement; the GRS joined the primary
1–15 September 2026	Formal candidate applications
16 September 2026	The organising committee confirmed the five candidates
5 October 2026	Deadline to register for the first round
9 October, 08:00 – 11 October, 18:00	First-round voting, extended from the original closing time of 10 October at 20:00
16–17 October 2026	Scheduled second round; not held following Glucksmann's first-round victory

The rules provided for an online two-round system. Voters could cast their ballots remotely or at supervised voting points equipped with tablets. Voting was personal and secret, and proxy voting was not permitted.

=== Electorate and participation fee ===
Paid-up members of the PS, Place Publique and the GRS were eligible to vote. Non-members could also register through the associated social-democratic body and contribute €15, with a reduced rate of €10 for students, unemployed people and people on low incomes. The deadline for first-round registration was 5 October; a separate deadline of 12 October had been set for a possible second round.

=== Candidate qualification and charter ===
The PS's published rules required a Socialist applicant to meet at least one of four sponsorship thresholds:

- 15 full members of the PS National Council;
- 10 Socialist parliamentarians;
- 50 Socialist mayors or presidents of intercommunal bodies, drawn from at least five departments and three regions; or
- 50 Socialist regional or departmental councillors, also drawn from at least five departments and three regions.

Formal applications also had to include the required declarations and acceptance of the primary's charter. Under that charter, every candidate undertook to propose negotiations with the parties of the democratic, ecological and republican left on a common programme, a legislative agreement and a contract for government.

== Candidates ==
The organising committee confirmed the following five candidates on 16 September 2026. Ages are given as of the opening of voting on 9 October.

Candidate	Party	Principal offices	Candidacy and early campaign
Olivier Faure (aged 58)	Socialist Party	First Secretary of the Socialist Party (since 2018); Deputy for Seine-et-Marne's 11th constituency (since 2012); Municipal councillor of Lieusaint (since 2026)	Faure confirmed his candidacy during the 8 pm news on TF1 on 30 August, after privately informing Socialist deputies. His launch called for une France plus juste ("a fairer France").
Raphaël Glucksmann (aged 46)	Place Publique	Co-president of Place Publique (since 2022); Member of the European Parliament (since 2019)	Glucksmann announced his presidential candidacy on 23 August and confirmed that he would seek the nomination through the primary. His campaign, branded Réveiller la France ("Awaken France"), called for a new "patriotic contract" combining social-democratic, ecological and pro-European themes.
Jérôme Guedj (aged 54)	Socialist Party	Deputy for Essonne's 6th constituency (since 2022); Member of the Regional Council of Île-de-France (since 2021)	Guedj first declared a presidential candidacy outside the planned United Left primary on 5 February. On 23 August he said that he would instead take part in the PS–Place Publique process. His campaign used the title of his 2026 book, La République, c'est nous ! ("We are the Republic!").
Emmanuel Maurel (aged 53)	Republican and Socialist Left	Deputy for Val-d'Oise's 3rd constituency (since 2024); National co-facilitator of the GRS (since 2019)	The GRS joined the primary on 26 August. Maurel formally announced his candidacy on 4 September, presenting himself as a candidate of an "authentic" left.
Ségolène Royal (aged 73)	Socialist Party	Socialist presidential nominee in 2007; Minister of Ecology (2014–2017); President of the Regional Council of Poitou-Charentes (2004–2014)	Royal announced her candidacy on 10 July, the day after the internal PS vote. She revived the themes La France tranquille ("A calm France") and l'ordre juste ("the just order") from her earlier national campaigns.

== Campaign ==
=== Opening phase ===
The field emerged in stages. Brun and Royal announced before the rules were finalised; Guedj and Glucksmann joined in late August, followed by the GRS's entry and Faure's declaration. The first occasion on which most of the field appeared in the same political setting was the PS summer conference in Blois on 28–29 August.

Coverage at the conference portrayed the race as an early duel between Faure and Glucksmann. Glucksmann entered with support from several prominent Socialists and was the only prospective social-democratic presidential candidate then polling in double figures in broader presidential surveys, while Faure led the largest participating party and had recently won another term as its first secretary. Both camps publicly called for a civil contest, although their competing approaches to left-wing alliances quickly became the principal strategic divide.

=== Alliances and La France Insoumise ===
During negotiation of the common charter, Glucksmann sought an explicit commitment barring future electoral agreements with LFI. The final agreement did not include that demand. Instead, it referred more generally to cooperation among the democratic, ecological and republican left, leaving the status of LFI open to interpretation.

Glucksmann and several of his Socialist supporters argued for a clear break with LFI. Faure, who had helped negotiate the New Popular Front agreement in 2024, opposed writing an advance exclusion into the charter. The disagreement also concerned the legislative agreements that might follow the presidential nomination.

=== Televised debates ===
The five candidates took part in three televised debates: on LCI on 23 September, on France 2 and France Inter on 1 October, and on BFM TV on 4 October.

Relations with LFI remained a major dividing line. Glucksmann and Guedj opposed renewed alliances with the party, whereas Faure, Royal and Maurel declined to rule out cooperation in legislative elections.

=== Participation fee controversy ===
The €15 standard fee was criticised by Brun, Royal and Faure as too high to attract a broad electorate. Brun called the amount excessive and argued that it risked deterring working-class supporters. Faure said that he would have preferred the rejected €2 open-primary model. He also argued that, after the available tax reduction, the €15 contribution could cost a taxpayer €5, less than the €10 concession paid by a non-taxpayer, which he described as a paradox.

Le Point reported that one rationale for the higher fee was to help finance the ballot and discourage organised entryism by people with no connection to the participating parties. Critics within the PS countered that it could suppress turnout. Faure said that he hoped for about 100,000 voters; at the time, the PS reported about 41,000 members and Place Publique about 12,000, while more than two million people had voted in the 2017 open primary.

=== Campaign arrangements ===
After Faure entered the contest, Nantes mayor Johanna Rolland took responsibility for the day-to-day leadership and public coordination of the PS during the campaign.

Brun and Guedj also stepped back from their roles coordinating the Socialist parliamentary group's budget negotiations until 18 October, the day after a possible second round. Their responsibilities were transferred to MPs Estelle Mercier and Sandrine Runel, respectively, to separate the primary campaign from the National Assembly's autumn budget work.

== Endorsements ==
The following selected endorsements had been reported by 31 August 2026; the lists are not exhaustive.

- Faure – MEP Pierre Jouvet, Haute-Garonne departmental council president Sébastien Vincini, and MPs Arthur Delaporte and Dieynaba Diop.
- Glucksmann – Socialist National Assembly leader Boris Vallaud, Occitania regional president Carole Delga, Rouen mayor Nicolas Mayer-Rossignol, MPs Sacha Houlié and Aurélien Rousseau, MEP Aurore Lalucq, senator Yannick Jadot, and former MEP Daniel Cohn-Bendit.

== Non-participants ==
=== Excluded or unsuccessful candidacies ===
- Philippe Brun (PS), deputy for Eure's 4th constituency, announced his candidacy on 30 June. He was suspended from the PS as a precautionary measure on 16 September following allegations of violence, preventing him from participating in the primary. Brun accused the party of exploiting a dispute with a former staff member to remove him from the contest. On 23 September, the Paris Court of Appeal rejected his application for reinstatement, upholding the earlier decision of the Paris judicial court.
- Fabien Verdier, former mayor of Châteaudun, failed to obtain the necessary nominations.

=== Not entering the primary ===
- Anne Hidalgo (PS), former mayor of Paris and the party's 2022 presidential nominee, ruled out another presidential candidacy in November 2024.
- Carole Delga (PS), president of the Occitania regional council, endorsed Glucksmann.
- Boris Vallaud (PS), leader of the Socialist group in the National Assembly, endorsed Glucksmann.

=== Considering or pursuing a candidacy outside the primary ===
- Karim Bouamrane (PS), mayor of Saint-Ouen-sur-Seine, confirmed that he would not participate, arguing that the process was too inward-looking.
- François Hollande (PS), president of France from 2012 to 2017, said that he would not enter the primary while leaving open the possibility of a separate presidential bid.
- Bernard Cazeneuve (La Convention), prime minister from 2016 to 2017, pursued a presidential candidacy outside the primary.

== Voting ==
On 9 October, the opening day of voting, the e-votez platform was targeted by a denial-of-service attack, slowing connections and preventing some voters from accessing the ballot. The organisers said that voting continued and that the integrity of votes already cast had not been compromised. With the agreement of the participating parties and all five candidates, the organising committee extended voting from 20:00 on 10 October to 18:00 on 11 October.

== Results ==
A total of 120,587 ballots were cast, representing a turnout of 85.96%. Of these, 120,307 were valid votes and 280 were blank or invalid. Glucksmann won an outright majority in the first round. No second round was required. Faure finished second, followed by Royal, Maurel and Guedj.

First-round results
Candidate	Party	Votes	%
Raphaël Glucksmann	Place Publique	79,613	66.13
Olivier Faure	Socialist Party	17,398	14.48
Ségolène Royal	Socialist Party	9,165	7.62
Emmanuel Maurel	Republican and Socialist Left	7,119	5.92
Jérôme Guedj	Socialist Party	7,012	5.83
Valid votes		120,307	99.77
Blank and invalid votes		280	0.23
Total votes		120,587	100.00
Abstentions		19,695	14.04
Registered voters / turnout		140,282	85.96

=== Reactions ===
Glucksmann called for further efforts to unite the left. Royal expressed disappointment with her result but also called for unity. Guedj welcomed Glucksmann's victory and interpreted it as a rejection of alliances with La France Insoumise.

== See also ==
- 2026 United Left primary
- 2027 French presidential election
