= 2026 United Left primary =

United left primary election in France

- Cancelled
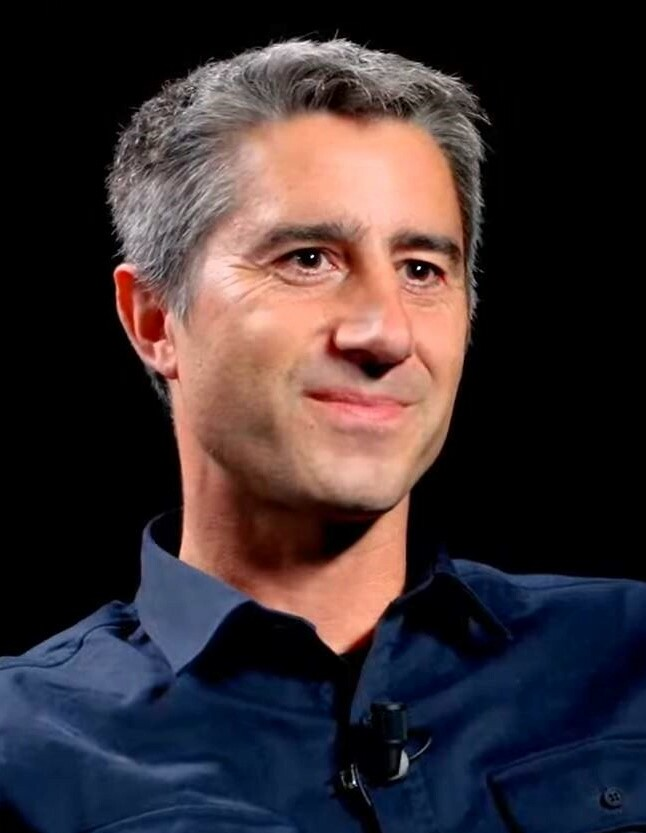

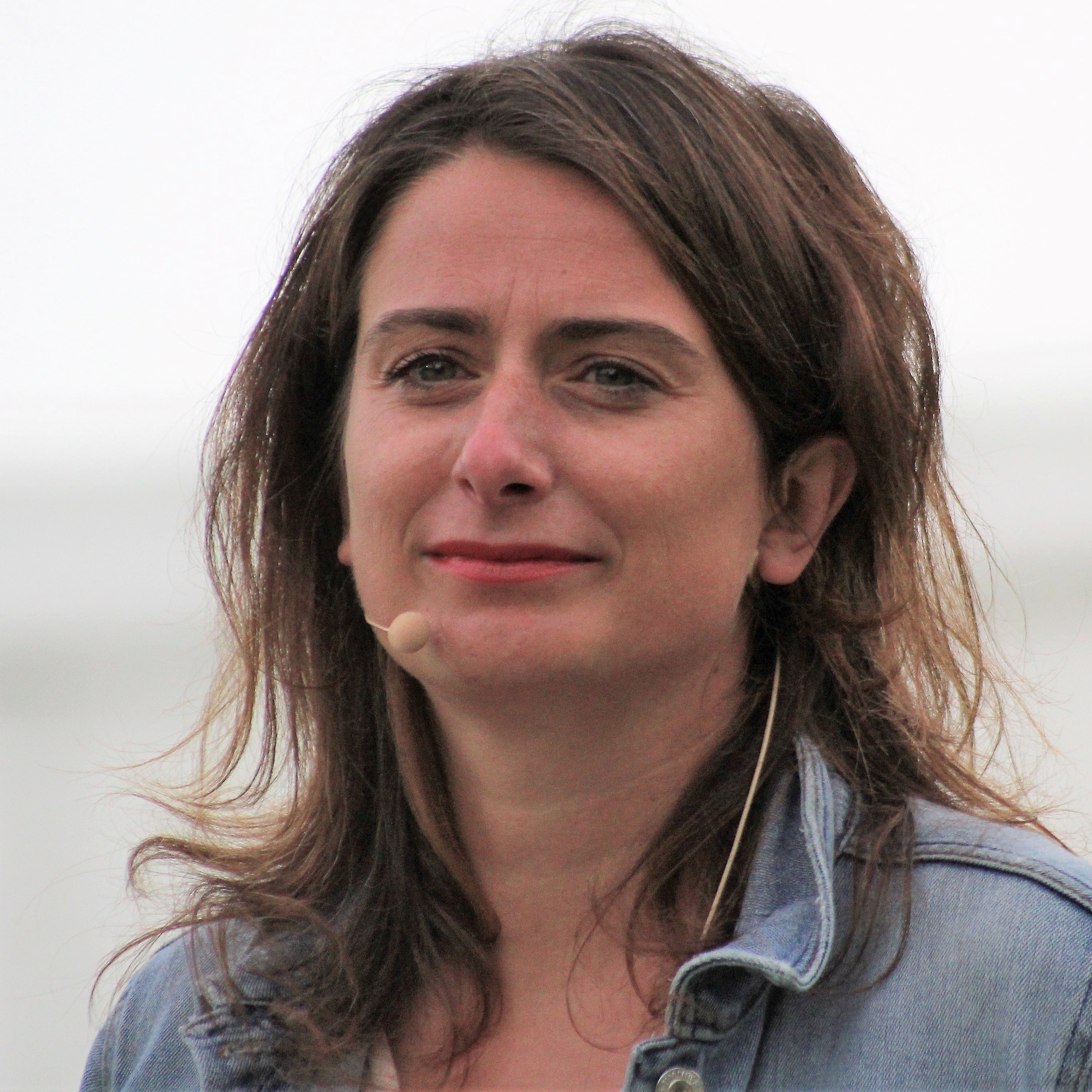
Candidate	François Ruffin	Marine Tondelier
Party	D!	LE
Presidential nominee
Primary cancelled

The 2026 United Left primary was a primary election in France that was planned to be held on 11 October 2026, which aimed to select a joint New Popular Front (NFP) candidate for the 2027 French presidential election. La France Insoumise and the French Communist Party rejected participating, while the Socialist Party and Place Publique competed in a separate primary.

== History ==
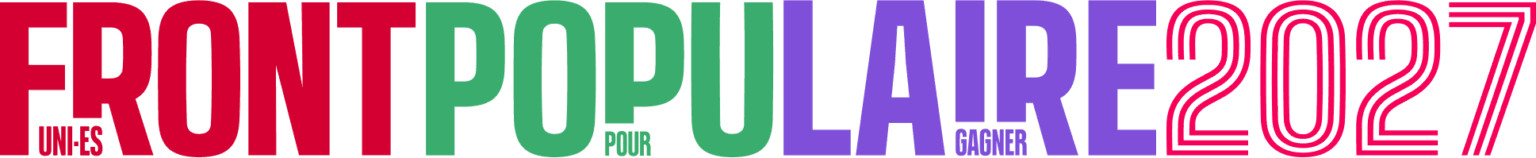
Logo of the Primary

=== Origins ===
The primary was jointly initiated by Marine Tondelier, the national secretary of the Ecologists, Olivier Faure, first secretary of the Socialist Party, Lucie Castets, the New Popular Front's candidate for Prime Minister in 2024, François Ruffin, the national coordinator of Debout!, and Clémentine Autain, one of the co-founders of L'Après, on 15 November 2025.

=== Participation ===
This primary was not unanimously supported by the participants of the New Popular Front (the left-wing coalition for the 2024 legislative elections):

- Les Écologistes, L'Après and Debout! confirmed their participation.
- The PS was divided on the issue of its participation. PS First Secretary Olivier Faure committed to an internal consultation after the 2026 municipal elections. In February, the president of the Socialist group in the National Assembly, Boris Vallaud, took a stand against the primary. The party ultimately chose to hold its own, separate primary.
- The French Communist Party (PCF) was to decide on its strategy for the presidential election in July at its congress. In February, Léon Deffontaines, spokesperson for the PCF, stated: ‘We are preparing to field our own candidate who will not go through the primary’. Fabien Roussel has declared that he will stand as presidential candidate for his party.
- La France Insoumise and Place Publique announced from the outset that they would not participate. Place Publique participated in the Socialist Party's primary.

== Procedure ==
The primary election was scheduled for 11 October 2026 and was to be held in person and online. A polling station was to be set up in each canton of metropolitan France and in the overseas departments and regions. To be a candidate, one would have had to obtain 500 signatures from mayors and elected officials (who could sponsor 2 to 3 candidates) "as for the presidential election".

== Candidates ==
Candidate	Party	Political office(s)	Campaign and slogan
François Ruffin (50)	Debout!	President of Debout! (since 2025); Deputy for Somme's 1st constituency (since 2017)	
Marine Tondelier (39)	Les Écologistes	National Secretary of the Ecologists (since 2022); Municipal Councillor of Hénin-Beaumont (since 2014); Regional Councillor of Hauts-de-France (since 2021)	

=== Internal Designations ===
==== Les Écologistes ====
On 8 December 2025, members of Les Écologistes (The Ecologists) chose Marine Tondelier, the party's secretary general, to represent them in a left-wing primary.

Candidates	%
Marine Tondelier	86%
Waleed Mouhali	14%

== Opinion polling ==
In a poll conducted by Ipsos on 4–5 February 2026, 78% of left-wing supporters were in favour of holding a primary election.
