= Marine Tondelier =

French politician (born 1986)

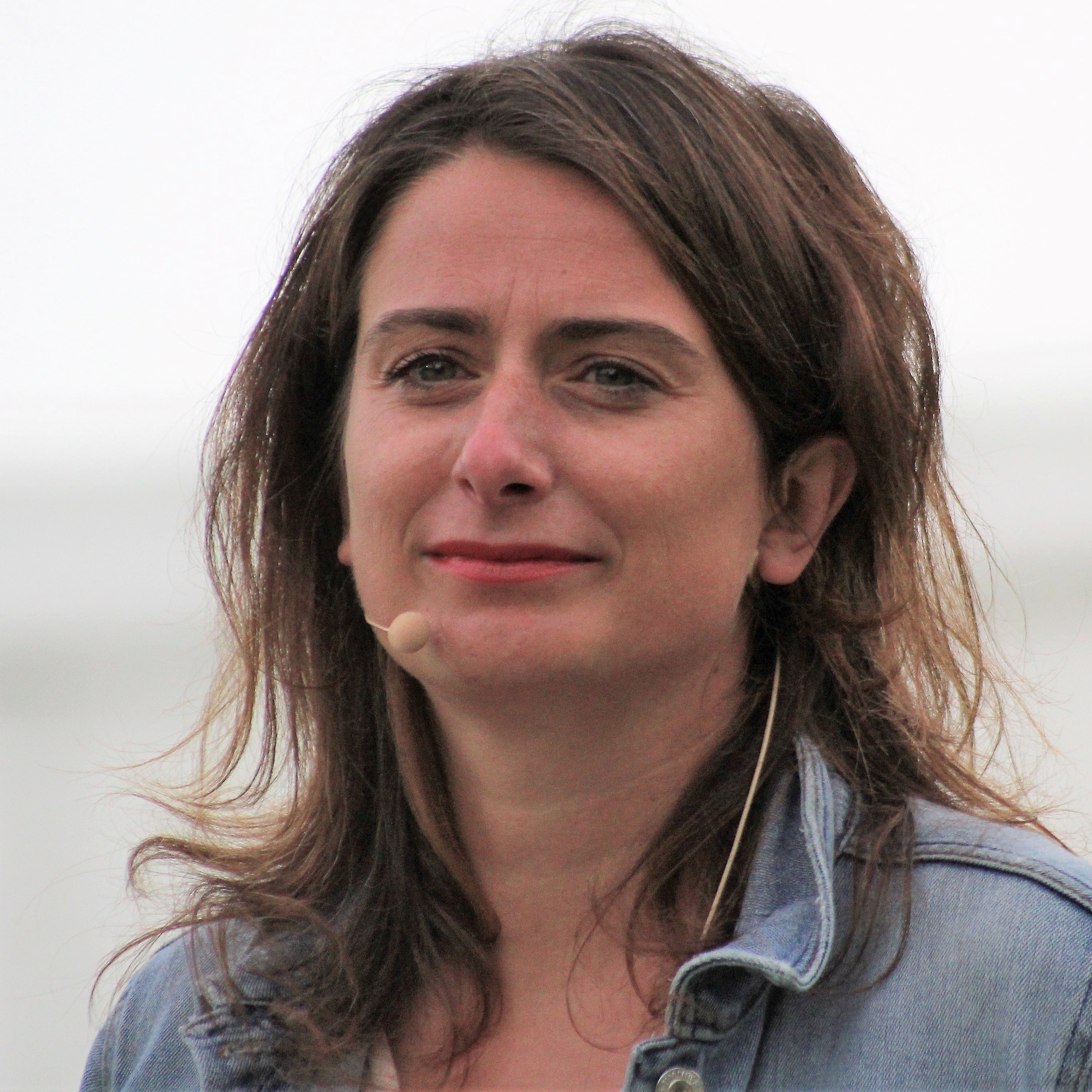
- Marine Tondelier in 2021.

National Secretary of The Ecologists
- Incumbent
- Assumed office 10 December 2022
- Preceded by: Julien Bayou (indirectly); Léa Balage El Mariky and Jérémie Crépel (acting collective leadership)

Member of the Regional Council of Hauts-de-France
- Incumbent
- Assumed office 2 July 2021
- President: Xavier Bertrand
- Constituency: Pas-de-Calais

Member of the Council of Hénin-Carvin Aglomeration Community
- Incumbent
- Assumed office 17 April 2014
- President: Jean-Pierre Corbisez; Christophe Pilch

Member of the Hénin-Beaumont City Council
- Incumbent
- Assumed office 30 March 2014

Personal details
- Born: 23 August 1986 (age 40) Bois-Bernard, France
- Party: The Ecologists (2010–present)
- Other political affiliations: The Greens (2009–2010); New Popular Front (2024–present)
- Children: 1
- Education: Sciences Po Lille

Marine Tondelier (French pronunciation: [maʁin tɔ̃dəlje]; born 23 August 1986) is a French left-wing politician and national secretary of The Ecologists since 2022. She was elected to this role after winning 90.8% of the vote in the second round of the party's congress on 10 December 2022. She is also one of the leading figures of the New Popular Front, an alliance of French left-wing parties.

== Early life and career ==
Tondelier was born in Bois-Bernard, Pas-de-Calais, France on 23 August 1986. She grew up in Hénin-Beaumont, the sixth largest town in Pas-de-Calais, raised by a homeopathic doctor father and a dentist mother. Her grandparents were pharmacists in Hénin-Liétard and farmers in Beaumont-en-Artois (these communes merged to create Hénin-Beaumont).

She graduated from Sciences Po Lille in 2009 from the public careers track, then earned a masters degree in healthcare management.

She gained her first professional experience through internships at the French Embassy in Stockholm, IGAS, and Greater Paris University Hospitals. Then she was the parliamentary assistant to EELV Senator Aline Archimbaud from 2011 to 2015, for whom she notably followed health and social policy issues, then to Cécile Duflot from 2015 to 2017. From 2017 to 2022, she was general delegate for the French regulator overseeing approved air quality monitoring agencies at the national level.

== Political career ==
Tondelier began her political career in 2009 and ran on the Greens list in partial municipal elections after the Socialist mayor, Gérard Dalongeville, was removed for misuse of public funds, corruption, forgery, and use of forged documents. The list, led by Régine Calzia, was not successful winning only 8.72% of the vote in the first round behind the National Front's Steeve Briois and an independent left-wing candidate.

In 2012, she was presented as The Ecologists (EELV) candidate for the National Assembly in Pas-de-Calais's 11th constituency running against a Socialist candidate as well as Marine Le Pen and left-wing Jean-Luc Mélenchon. She denounced the exploitation of the situation in Hénin-Beaumont by the two national leaders in a debate stating that they would not benefit the constituency: "The mining region is tired, it's angry, and it's becoming furious." She obtained 1.63% of the vote in the first round which was won by Le Pen with the Socialist candidate Philippe Kemel coming in second place before defeating Le Pen by 118 votes in the second round (Le Pen would win the constituency in the following election).

In 2015, she ran in the 2015 French departmental elections in the 11th constituency of the Canton of Hénin-Beaumont with her pair obtaining 6.50% of the vote in the first round. She was then chosen to lead a joint list between EELV and Left Party in the 2015 Nord-Pas-de-Calais-Picardie regional election, winning 4.83% of the vote in the first round.

She was again the EELV candidate in the Pas-de-Calais's 11th constituency in the 2017 French legislative election, this time winning 3.55% before being eliminated in the first round. In the 2019 European Parliament election in France, she was included in the EELV list which won 13.48% of the vote and won 13 seats (she was in the 74th position and was not elected to the European Parliament).

She again was a candidate in the Pas-de-Calais's 11th constituency for the 2022 French legislative election, this time supported by the New Ecological and Social People's Union (NUPES) alliance parties. She advanced from the first round in second place with 23% of the vote and lost to Marine Le Pen in the second round winning 39% of the vote.

In 2024, she became head of The Ecologists.

Marine Tondelier is a candidate of the 2026 United Left primary for the 2027 French presidential election. In the announcement of her campaign, she called herself a "peacekeeper of the left."

== Views ==
In June 2023, a French police union said they were at war with "vermin". Unions representing half of French police added that unless officers enjoy still greater legal protection and more resources in the future, "tomorrow we will be in resistance". Marine Tondelier described it as “an appeal for civil war”.

Tondelier is an outspoken critic of the State of Israel and a participant of the pro-Palestinian Gaza war protests. On 15 October 2024, roughly a year after the beginning of the Gaza war, Tondelier took part in a pro-Palestinian demonstration at the Place de la République in Paris. Along with Tondelier, major participants were Thomas Portes of La France Insoumise and Salah Hamouri. "This helplessness is terrible because we have been protesting for a year and this atrocity has been going on for a year," said Tondelier in her speech, accusing world leaders of ignoring the actions of the Israel Defence Forces and expressing sorrow at the continuation of the war. In 2025, she publicly described the Israeli actions in Gaza as a genocide and an ecocide; she has called to suspend the European Union association agreement with Israel and ban the imports from Israeli settlements By December 2025, Tondelier continued to attend pro-Palestinian rallies; at one of them, on the eve of the recognition of the State of Palestine by France, she defended the right to hoist Palestinian flags outside town halls despite the demands of the government and the right-wing forces not to, saying that "a flag on the front of town hall has never killed anyone, while in Gaza the Israeli army kills each day." At the same time, Tondelier has condemned the October 7th attacks by Hamas, and on 12 November 2023, she took part in the March for the Republic and Against Antisemitism in Paris.

Tondelier has voiced support for Ukraine in the Russo-Ukrainian War and is critical of Jean-Luc Melenchon in this regard. In response to Melenchon, Tondelier stated that "Ukraine has a right to defend itself" and wrote that "hiding behind a false pacifism that equates the victim and the aggressor is indecent—especially when Russia is escalating tensions in Europe by ramping up attacks on our societies through drones, cyberattacks, and interference"; "let us stop making excuses for the aggressor, who is counting on exactly that and is closely watching the stances taken by the various French presidential candidates—knowing full well that the election will be decisive on this issue."

During a heatwave in 2026, as leader of the French Green Party, The Ecologists, Tondelier reversed the party's longstanding opposition to air conditioning by declaring that "there are places where we can no longer live without air conditioning" and that "the reality is that we urgently need to equip public services, particularly schools and hospitals, with air conditioning."
