= Mossa Palatina =

- President: Nicolas Battini
- Founder: Nicolas Battini
- Founded: March 9, 2024
- Headquarters: Tour 2 Residence Montesoro, 20600 Bastia, Haute-Corse
- Ideology: Corsican nationalism Anti-immigration; Islamophobia
- Political position: Far-right
- Colors: Navy Blue; Black

Mossa Palatina (Corsican for Palatine Movement) is a far-right political party on the island of Corsica.

Founded in 2024, the main goal of Mossa Palatina is to offer a right-wing alternative for other Corsican nationalist parties like Nazione and Core in Fronte, both of which are far-left parties. Since its foundation, Mossa Palatina has become the largest far-right party in Corsica. Nicolas Battini, the founder of the party, ran for mayor of Bastia in the 2026 municipal elections, receiving 16.7% of the vote in the first round and 13.8% in the second.

== History ==
Corsican nationalism since the 1970s has been largely associated with the left wing. The National Liberation Front of Corsica, the largest nationalist association to date and the principal militant formation in the Corsican conflict, adopted a Marxist philosophy which appealed to many rural Corsicans. The many descendants of the FLNC and other separatist armed groups which appeared during the Corsican conflict largely adhered to left-wing ideology as well. A very small minority of Corsican nationalists adhered to right-wing politics, however. The FLNC had a small right-wing faction in the 1980s, and before this in the 1960s, the first militant Corsican association, the Corsican Committee for Independence, adhered to far-right and anti-immigration politics and had ties to the Organisation Armée Secrète, or OAS, a guerrilla group fighting to maintain French rule in Algeria.

In recent years, coinciding with the rise of right-wing politics in Western Europe, some Corsican nationalists began to shift to the right of the political spectrum. This resulted in the creation of the Palatinu Association in late 2021, the predecessor to Mossa Palatina. The Palatinu Association campaigned to preserve "Corsican identity" amidst an "extinction event" of immigration from mainland France and the Maghreb. The founder of the Palatinu Association, Nicolas Battini, is a former left-wing activist and former member of the FLNC-Union of Combatants who was sentenced to eight years in prison for terrorism in 2013, implicated in a bomb attack on the prefecture building in Corte a year prior.

Mossa Palatina was founded by Battini and other Palatinu Association members on 9 March 2024 in Ajaccio. According to Battini, the movement is hinged on "traditional values of family and rural life". In an interview with Corse-Matin, Battini said his party was going to wage a "crusade" on the Corsican government against "Islamism" and the "urban elite rallied behind progressive politics". Battini also declared his party would run in the 2026 municipal elections and the 2028 Corsican territorial election.

Upon the dissolution of parliament and the announcement of the 2024 snap elections for the National Assembly, Battini announced his party would run in three of the four constituencies in Corsica: Haute-Corse's 1st constituency, where he would run, Corse-du-Sud's 1st constituency, where Mossa Palatina board member Lisandru Luciani would run, and Corse-du-Sud's 2nd constituency, where entrepreneur Michel Chiocca would run. In the end, Battini got 4.2% of the vote, Luciani got 3.6% of the vote, and Chiocca got 2.7% of the vote.

On 27 September 2025, Mossa Palatina held a conference where they unveiled "project Ugo Colonna". Ugo Colonna is a mythical figure in Corsican folklore that drove out the saracen Muslims from Corsica in the Middle Ages. Colonna stated that the project aims to "reclaim Corsican nationalism" from "left-wing forces". The goal of project Ugo Colonna is to establish special status for ethnic Corsicans in the government and housing sectors. Battini also rejected in the same conference the long-standing doctrine in nationalist circles of the "community of destiny". The community of destiny states that regardless of national origin, anyone in Corsica, so long as they adopt the local culture and language, could be Corsican and fight for national liberation. Battini and his party stated that Corsican people are "facing extinction" from migrants and French mainlanders.

In the 2026 municipal elections, Mossa Palatina forged an alliance with Marine Le Pen's National Rally. Le Pen even personally endorsed Battini for mayor of Bastia. In an interview with RMC on March 12, Le Pen was asked about Battini's past in the FLNC-UC, and she stated, "I met [Battini]. he is a nationalist, was drawn into a spiral of violence, he was 18 years old, he blew up a sub-prefecture, it is obviously reprehensible and he did 8 years in prison, a severe sentence for that, and then renounced violence." In the end, a Mossa Palatina-RN coalition list only got 16.7% of the vote in the first round and 13.8% in the second. The coaltition candidate in Ajaccio, François Filoni, got 18.6% of votes in the first round of elections and 12.8% in the second.

== Ideology and support ==
Mossa Palatina is described as a far-right political party. The party is primarily a Corsican nationalist force, the only right-wing Corsican nationalist organisation surrounded by numerous left-wing groups. According to the party's website, Mossa Palatina is committed to Corsican nationalism, preservation of the Corsican language, economic liberalism and defense of entrepreneurship, and sovereignty of all peoples.

The party also supports self-determination movements in other European countries, such as the Basque independence movement and the Irish unification movement. The party also supports the State of Israel, a pivot from other nationalist movements, some of which have connections to Palestinian armed groups such as Hamas.

Mossa Palatina also supports the "Defense of rural areas", which it considers the backbone of Corsican identity.

According to its own website, the party supports the "defense of individual freedoms, whether woke-like or islamic". However, the party has been accused of homophobia by many in government and public circles. The party pressured the Corsican government to dissolve sexual education programs in schools in 2025, claiming they inspire "drag-nun shows" and promote "gender theories". Mossa Palatina also uses islamophobic rhetoric quite often, accusing Muslims of being "the enemy" and holding harsly anti-immigrant campaign policies.
