= Karim Bouamrane =

French politician (born 1973)

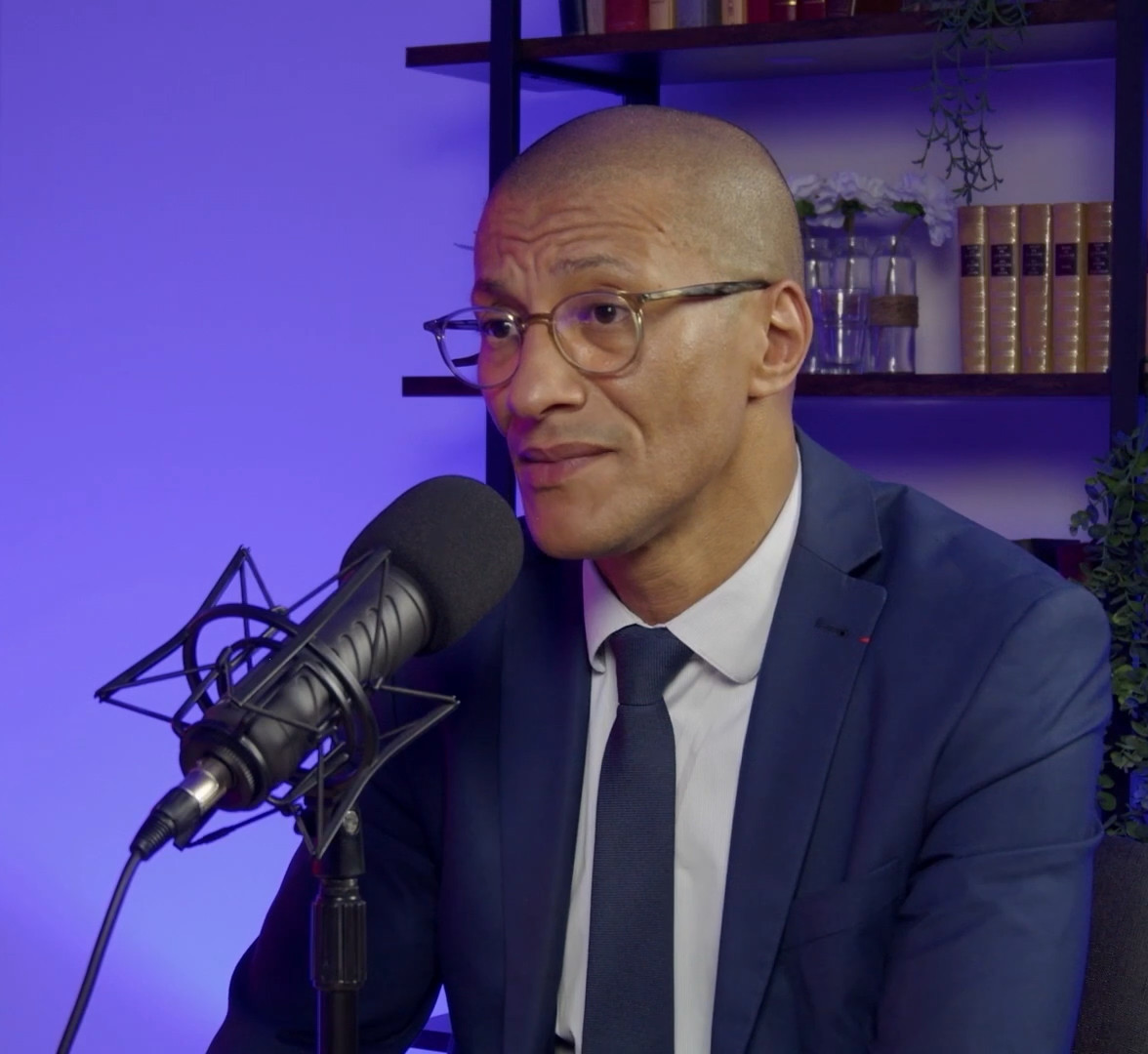
- Bouamrane in 2026.

Mayor of Saint-Ouen-sur-Seine
- Incumbent
- Assumed office 4 July 2020
- Preceded by: William Delannoy

Municipal councillor of Saint-Ouen-sur-Seine
- Incumbent
- Assumed office 4 July 2020
- In office 18 June 1995 – 23 March 2014

Personal details
- Born: 21 February 1973 (age 53) Clichy, France
- Party: PS (2014–present)
- Other political affiliations: PCF (1995–2014)
- Children: 3
- Occupation: Businessman • Politician
- Awards: Legion of Honour

Karim Bouamrane (French pronunciation: [kaʁim bwamʁan]; born 21 February 1973) is a French businessman and politician who has served as Mayor of Saint-Ouen-sur-Seine since 2020.

A moderate Socialist, he was featured in international news when his commune, a Parisian suburb, became the subject of reports for its extensive urban renewal ahead of the 2024 Summer Olympics. After the Olympics and prior to the appointment of Michel Barnier, French media speculated Bouamrane could be a contender for Prime Minister following the 2024 snap legislative election. Karim Bouamrane declared himself in September 2025 in favor of a measure to encourage mayors to respect social housing quotas, with a penalty of ineligibility for those who do not respect the 25% imposed by law.
