= Regional Council of Hauts-de-France =

Government of northern France

- Logo of Hauts-de-France

Type
- Type: Regional council

Leadership
- President: Xavier Bertrand, LR since 4 January 2016

Structure
- Seats: 170
- Political groups: Government (110): The Republicans (71); Union of Democrats and Independents (29); Democratic Movement (10); Opposition (60): National Rally (33); Europe Ecology : The Greens - La France Insoumise (15); Socialist Party - French Communist Party (13)

Elections
- Voting system: Two-round list proportional representation system with majority bonus
- Last election: 20 and 27 June 2021
- Next election: 2028 French regional elections

Meeting place
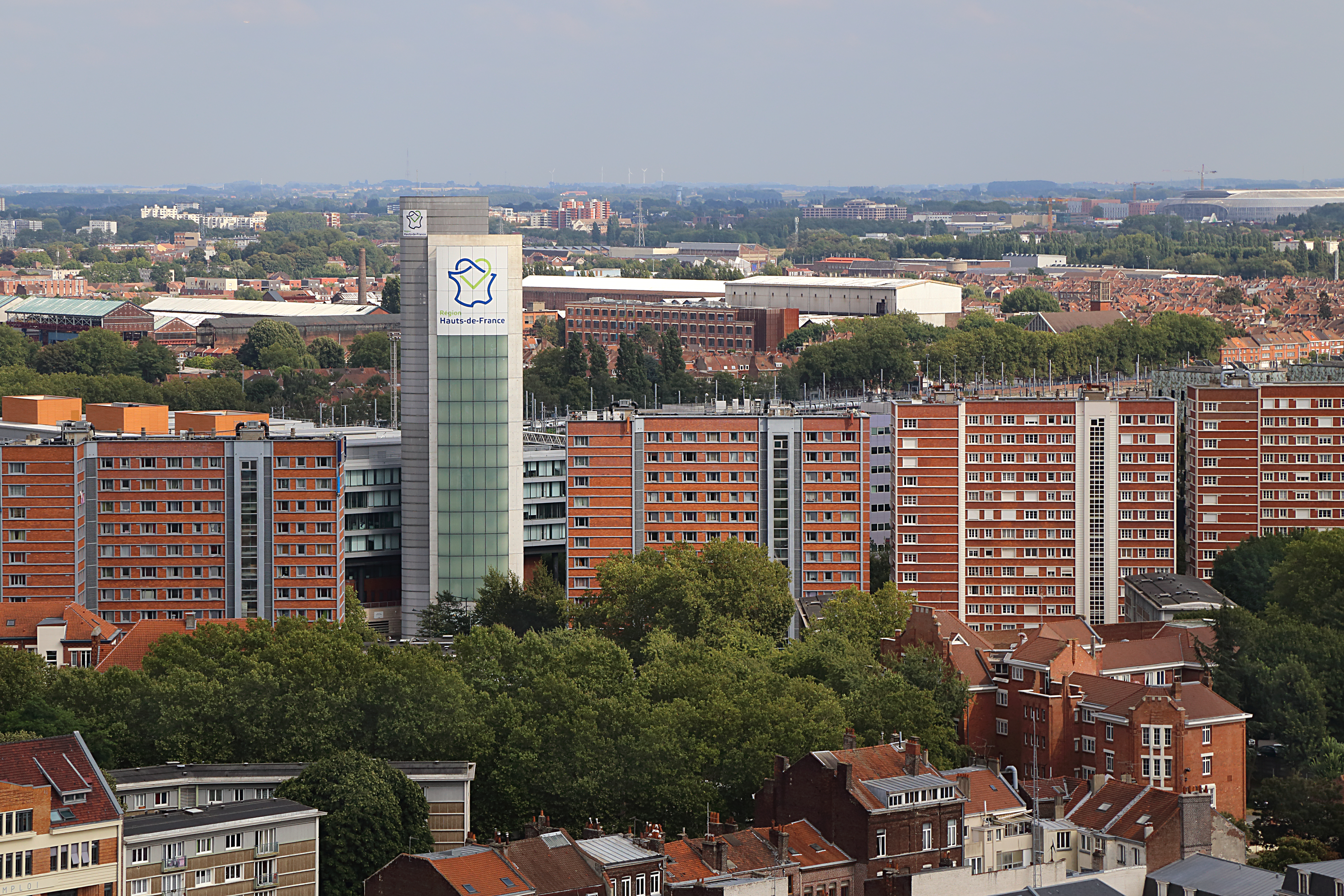
- Hôtel de Région des Hauts-de-France; 151 Avenue du Président-Hoover, Lille

The Regional Council of Hauts-de-France (French: Conseil régional des Hauts-de-France; Picard: Consièl régional d'chés Heuts-d'Franche) is the deliberative assembly of the Hauts-de-France region in Northern France.

It was named Regional Council of Nord-Pas-de-Calais-Picardie before the vote of the regional councillors on 14 March 2016 on the name of the new region, after public consultation. This new name had however to be confirmed by the Government of France and Conseil d'État by the decree of 28 September 2016. Since 4 January 2016, the body has been presided over by Xavier Bertrand.

== History ==
The Regional Council of Hauts-de-France, created by the law on the delimitation of regions, regional and departmental elections and modifying the electoral calendar of 16 January 2015 with effect from 1 January 2016, is the result of the merger of Nord-Pas-de-Calais and Picardie, which respectively comprised 113 and 57 elected representatives (170 cumulated regional councillors).

Lille is the prefecture of the new region of Hauts-de-France. This choice was made final by a decree issued by the Conseil d'État on 28 September 2016, with Xavier Bertrand, chairman of the board having decided during the campaign to have Lille designated as the final regional capital. Regional deliberative bodies sit:

- at the regional services headquarters, at 151 Avenue du Président-Hoover, Lille, for plenary sessions.
- at the Hôtel de Région, at the 15 Mail Albert 1er in Amiens for permanent commissions.

Article 5 of the Act of 16 January 2015 establishes 170 the number of regional councillors; it distributes the number of candidates by departmental section for the December 2015 elections: 17 for Aisne; 76 for Nord; 25 for Oise; 44 for Pas-de-Calais; 18 for Somme.
