= Maxime Gremetz =

French politician

Maxime Gremet
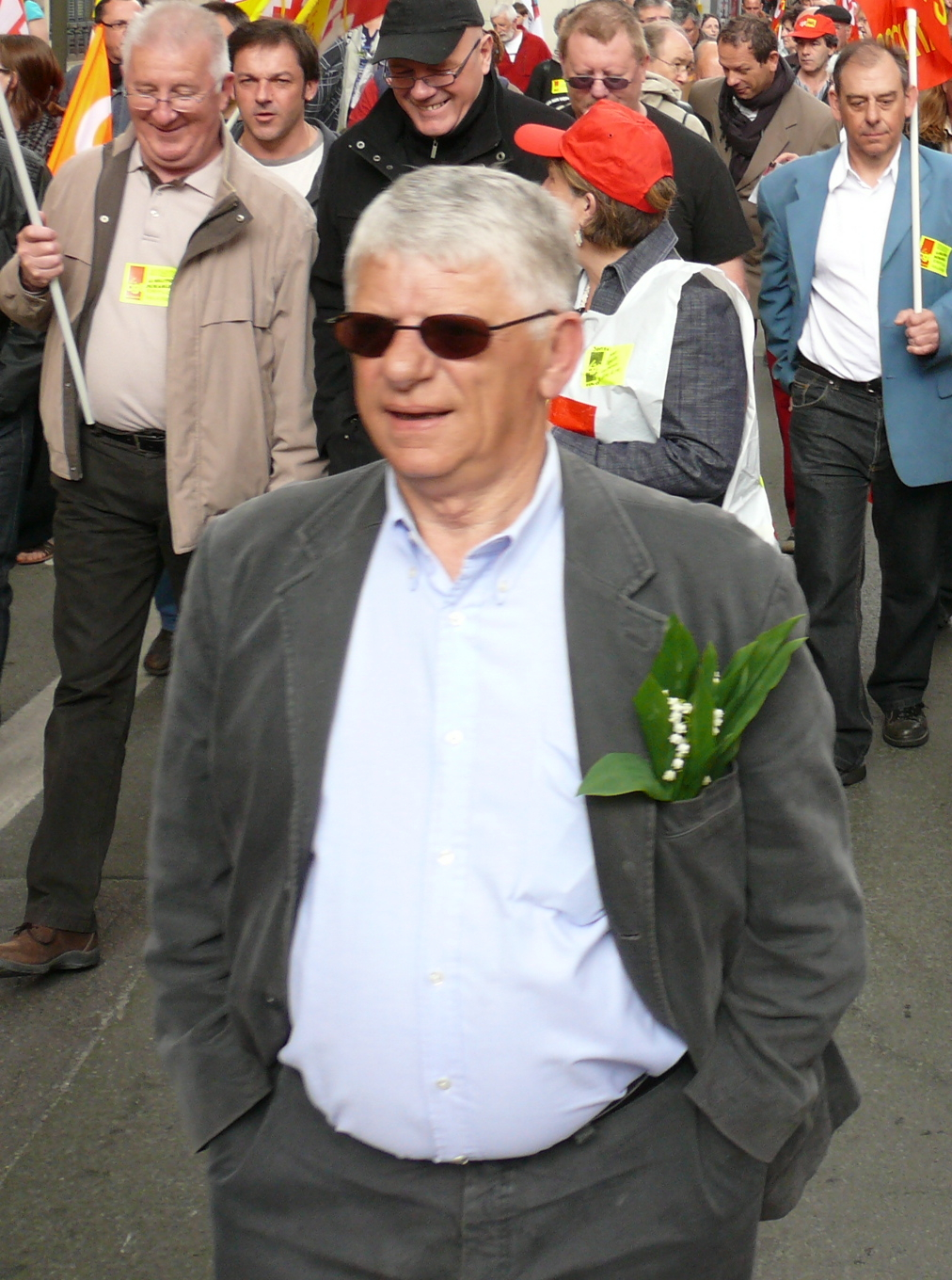
- Maxime Gremetz during a Labor Day demonstration at Amiens

Member of the French National Assembly for Somme's 1st constituency
- In office 2 April 1993 – 16 May 2011
- Preceded by: Jean-Claude Dessein
- Succeeded by: Pascale Boistard
- In office 3 April 1978 – 22 May 1981
- Preceded by: René Lamps
- Succeeded by: Jean-Claude Dessein

Personal details
- Born: 3 September 1940 (age 85) Canchy, France
- Party: PCF
- Occupation: Politician, Metallurgist

Maxime Gremetz (born September 3, 1940 in Canchy, Somme) was a member of the National Assembly of France. He represented the Somme's 1st constituency, and is a member of the French Communist Party and Gauche démocrate et républicaine.
