= Somme's 1st constituency =

Constituency of the National Assembly of France

1st constituency of Somme
- inline Constituency of the National Assembly of France

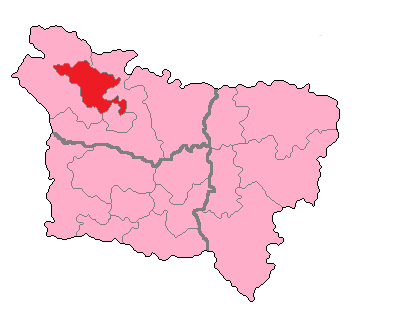
- The constituency shown within Picardie
- Incumbent deputy: François Ruffin; PD
- Department: Somme
- Cantons: Abbeville-Nord, Abbeville-Sud, Ailly-le-Haut-Clocher, Amiens-II-Nord-Ouest, Amiens-IV-Est, Amiens-VIII-Nord, Domart-en-Ponthieu, Picquigny
- Registered voters: 84,286 (2017)

The 1st constituency of Somme (French: Première circonscription de la Somme) is one of five electoral districts in the department of the same name, each of which returns one deputy to the French National Assembly in elections using the two-round system, with a run-off if no candidate receives more than 50% of the vote in the first round.

== Description ==
The constituency is made up of the eight cantons of Abbeville-Nord, Abbeville-Sud, Ailly-le-Haut-Clocher, Amiens-II-Nord-Ouest, Amiens-IV-Est, Amiens-VIII-Nord, Domart-en-Ponthieu, and Picquigny.

At the time of the 1999 census (which was the basis for the most recent redrawing of constituency boundaries, carried out in 2010) the 1st constituency had a total population of 95,650.

It contains both the town of Abbeville and the northern part of the city of Amiens, the boundary being the course of the River Somme.

Since the defeat of the Gaullist deputy and war hero Fred Moore by the French Communist Party's candidate René Lamps in 1962 the seat has been held continuously by the left.

== Historic representation ==
| Election | Member | Party |
|---|---|---|
| 1958 | Fred Moore | UNR |
| 1962 | René Lamps | PCF |
| 1967 | René Lamps | PCF |
| 1968 | René Lamps | PCF |
| 1973 | René Lamps | PCF |
| 1978 | Maxime Gremetz | PCF |
| 1981 | Jean-Claude Dessein | PS |
| 1986 | Proportional representation – no election by constituency | |
| 1988 | Jean-Claude Dessein | PS |
| 1993 | Maxime Gremetz | PCF |
| 1997 | Maxime Gremetz | PCF |
| 2002 | Maxime Gremetz | PCF |
| 2007 | Maxime Gremetz | PCF |
| 2012 | Pascale Boistard | PS |
| 2017 | François Ruffin | PD |
| 2022 | François Ruffin | PD |
| 2024 | François Ruffin | PD |

== Election results ==
=== 2024 ===
| Candidate | Party | Alliance | First round | | | Second round | | |
| Candidate | Party | Alliance | Votes | % | +/– | Votes | % | +/– |
|---|---|---|---|---|---|---|---|---|
| Nathalie Ribeiro Billet | RN | | 21,413 | 40.69 | +18.11 | 24,083 | 47.05 | +8.06 |
| François Ruffin | PD | NFP | 17,850 | 33.92 | -6.17 | 27,108 | 52.95 | -8.06 |
| Albane Branlant | RE | Ensemble | 11,933 | 22.68 | +2.37 | withdrew | | |
| Bruno Dumont | DVC | | 776 | 1.47 | new | | | |
| Jean-Patrick Baudry | LO | | 653 | 1.24 | +0.09 | | | |
| Votes | | | 52,625 | 100.00 | | 51,191 | 100.00 | |
| Valid votes | | | 52,625 | 97.44 | -0.05 | 51,191 | 93.64 | +7.74 |
| Blank votes | | | 926 | 1.71 | -0.04 | 2,576 | 4.71 | -6.00 |
| Null votes | | | 459 | 0.85 | +0.09 | 900 | 1.65 | -1.74 |
| Turnout | | | 54,010 | 64.99 | +19.07 | 54,667 | 65.78 | +20.98 |
| Abstentions | | | 29,094 | 35.01 | -19.07 | 28,437 | 34.22 | -20.98 |
| Registered voters | | | 83,104 | | | 83,104 | | |
| Result | | | PD HOLD | | | | | |

=== 2022 ===
Legislative Election 2022: Somme's 1st constituency
| Party | Candidate | Votes | % | ±% |
|---|---|---|---|---|
| PD (NUPÉS) | François Ruffin | 15,081 | 40.09 | +8.71 |
| RN | Nathalie Ribeiro-Billet | 8,495 | 22.58 | +6.66 |
| LREM (Ensemble) | Pascal Rifflart | 7,640 | 20.31 | −13.82 |
| LR (UDC) | Mathilde Roy | 2,636 | 7.01 | −6.37 |
| LREM | Pascal Fradcourt* | 1,222 | 3.25 | N/A |
| REC | Pascal Scribe | 1,025 | 2.72 | N/A |
| PA | Thierry Vandeplassche | 758 | 2.01 | N/A |
| LO | Jean-Patrick Baudry | 432 | 1.15 | +0.35 |
| DLF (UPF) | Noé Boxoën | 332 | 0.88 | −0.71 |
| Turnout | | 37,621 | 45.92 | −0.64 |
2nd round result
| PD (NUPÉS) | François Ruffin | 19,731 | 61.01 | +5.04 |
| RN | Nathalie Ribeiro-Billet | 12,610 | 38.99 | N/A |
| Turnout | | 32,341 | 44.80 | +3.83 |
| PD hold | | | | |

* LREM dissident

=== 2017 ===
Legislative Election 2017: Somme's 1st constituency
| Party | Candidate | Votes | % | ±% |
|---|---|---|---|---|
| LREM | Nicolas Dumont | 13,394 | 34.13 | |
| PD | François Ruffin | 9,545 | 24.32 | |
| FN | Franck De Lapersonne | 6,255 | 15.94 | |
| LR | Stéphane Decayeux | 5,251 | 13.38 | |
| PS | Pascale Boistard | 2,770 | 7.06 | |
| Others | N/A | 2,033 | | |
| Turnout | | 39,248 | 46.56 | |
2nd round result
| PD | François Ruffin | 19,329 | 55.97 | |
| LREM | Nicolas Dumont | 15,205 | 44.03 | |
| Turnout | | 34,534 | 40.97 | |
| PD gain from PS | | Swing | | |

=== 2012 ===
Legislative Election 2012: Somme's 1st constituency
| Party | Candidate | Votes | % | ±% |
|---|---|---|---|---|
| PS | Pascale Boistard | 15,345 | 32.83 | |
| UMP | Stéphane Decayeux | 10,858 | 23.23 | |
| FN | Yvon Flahaut | 8,276 | 17.70 | |
| FG | Jean-Claude Renaux | 5,455 | 11.67 | |
| DVG | Mickaël Wamen | 2,945 | 6.30 | |
| Others | N/A | 3,866 | | |
| Turnout | | 46,745 | 54.91 | |
2nd round result
| PS | Pascale Boistard | 26,210 | 59.14 | |
| UMP | Stéphane Decayeux | 18,109 | 40.86 | |
| Turnout | | 44,319 | 52.06 | |
| PS gain from DVG | | | | |

=== 2007 ===
Legislative Election 2007: Somme's 1st constituency
| Party | Candidate | Votes | % | ±% |
|---|---|---|---|---|
| NM | Jean-Yves Bourgois | 8,317 | 25.83 | |
| DVG | Maxime Gremetz | 6,782 | 21.06 | |
| PS | Farida Andasmas | 5,060 | 15.72 | |
| PCF | Jean-Claude Renaux | 3,737 | 11.61 | |
| MoDem | Olivier Mira | 1,980 | 6.15 | |
| FN | Yann Celos | 1,723 | 5.35 | |
| DVD | Dominique Fachon | 919 | 2.85 | |
| CPNT | Joelle Toutain | 752 | 2.34 | |
| Far left | Francis Dolle | 672 | 2.09 | |
| Others | N/A | 2,256 | | |
| Turnout | | 32,928 | 54.74 | |
2nd round result
| DVG | Maxime Gremetz | 18,618 | 59.33 | |
| NM | Jean-Yves Bourgois | 12,761 | 40.67 | |
| Turnout | | 33,169 | 55.15 | |
| DVG gain from PCF | | | | |

=== 2002 ===
Legislative Election 2002: Somme's 1st constituency
| Party | Candidate | Votes | % | ±% |
|---|---|---|---|---|
| PCF | Maxime Gremetz | 8,369 | 24.38 | |
| UDF | Jean-Yves Bourgois | 5,742 | 16.73 | |
| PS | Francis Lecul | 5,715 | 16.65 | |
| UMP | Hubert Delarue | 4,393 | 12.80 | |
| FN | Jean-Paul Montigny | 4,287 | 12.49 | |
| CPNT | Nicole Cayeux | 1,930 | 5.62 | |
| LV | Eric Debord | 809 | 2.36 | |
| Others | N/A | 3,083 | | |
| Turnout | | 35,096 | 61.15 | |
2nd round result
| PCF | Maxime Gremetz | 16,730 | 54.77 | |
| UDF | Jean-Yves Bourgois | 13,818 | 45.23 | |
| Turnout | | 32,017 | 55.83 | |
| PCF hold | | | | |

=== 1997 ===
Legislative Election 1997: Somme's 1st constituency
| Party | Candidate | Votes | % | ±% |
|---|---|---|---|---|
| PCF | Maxime Gremetz | 9,456 | 25.33 | |
| UDF | Brigitte Foure | 9,095 | 24.36 | |
| PS | Francis Lecul | 7,483 | 20.04 | |
| FN | Yves Dupille | 6,202 | 16.61 | |
| LO | Florence Caze | 1,049 | 2.81 | |
| GE | Hubert Delarue | 1,029 | 2.76 | |
| LV | Thérèse Couraud | 758 | 2.03 | |
| Others | N/A | 3,022 | | |
| Turnout | | 39,061 | 70.12 | |
2nd round result
| PCF | Maxime Gremetz | 23,161 | 60.65 | |
| UDF | Brigitte Foure | 15,026 | 39.35 | |
| Turnout | | 40,671 | 73.04 | |
| PCF gain from PS | | | | |

== Sources ==
Official results of French elections from 2002: "Résultats électoraux officiels en France" (in French).
