= Margaret Abraham =

Professor of sociology

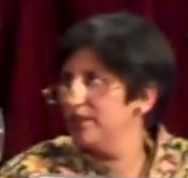
Margaret Abraham at the University of Buenos Aires in 2012.

Margaret Abraham is a professor of sociology at Hofstra University and served as the 18th president (2014–2018) of the International Sociological Association. She is known for her research regarding gender issues, specifically concerning women, and the ways gender issues are connected to concepts such as globalization, societal customs and norms, and violent behavior.

== Career ==
From 2010 to 2014 she had been Vice President of Research and the American Sociological Association Representative of the international Sociological Association. In 2014 she was elected President of the International Sociological Association, the first feminist researcher and activist to hold the position.

She served on the Board of Directors of Sakhi for South Asian Women and the Asian Pacific Islander Coalition on HIV/AIDS

From 2008 to 2015 she was Special Adviser to the Provost for Diversity Initiatives at Hofstra University, New York.

Her research interests are in the field of gender, and she takes a feminist and intersectional perspective to sociology. Her PhD thesis was on dual ethnic identity and marginality in Indian Jews, in India and Israel.

== Selected publications ==
- Abraham, Margaret; Maney, Gregory (2012). "Transforming place and belonging through action research, community practice, and public policy: Comparing responses to NIMBYism". Current Sociology. 60 (2): 178–201. doi:10.1177/0011392111429220. S2CID 143866320.
- Abraham, Margaret; Purkayastha, Bandana (2012). "Making a Difference: Linking Research and Action in Practice, Pedagogy and Policy for Social Justice". Current Sociology, Monograph Series. 60.
- Abraham, Margaret; Ngan-ling Chow, Esther; Martou-Alipranti, Laura; Tastsoglou, Evangelia (2010). Contours of Citizenship: Women, Diversity and Practices of Citizenship. Farnham: Ashgate. ISBN 9780754677796.
- Abraham, Margaret (2008). "Globalization and the Call Center Industry". International Sociology. 23 (2): 197–210. doi:10.1177/0268580907086376. S2CID 145676781.
- Abraham, Margaret (2000). Speaking the Unspeakable: Marital Violence among South Asians in the U.S.. New Jersey: Rutgers University Press. ISBN 9780813527932.
