= Nuit debout =

French social movement

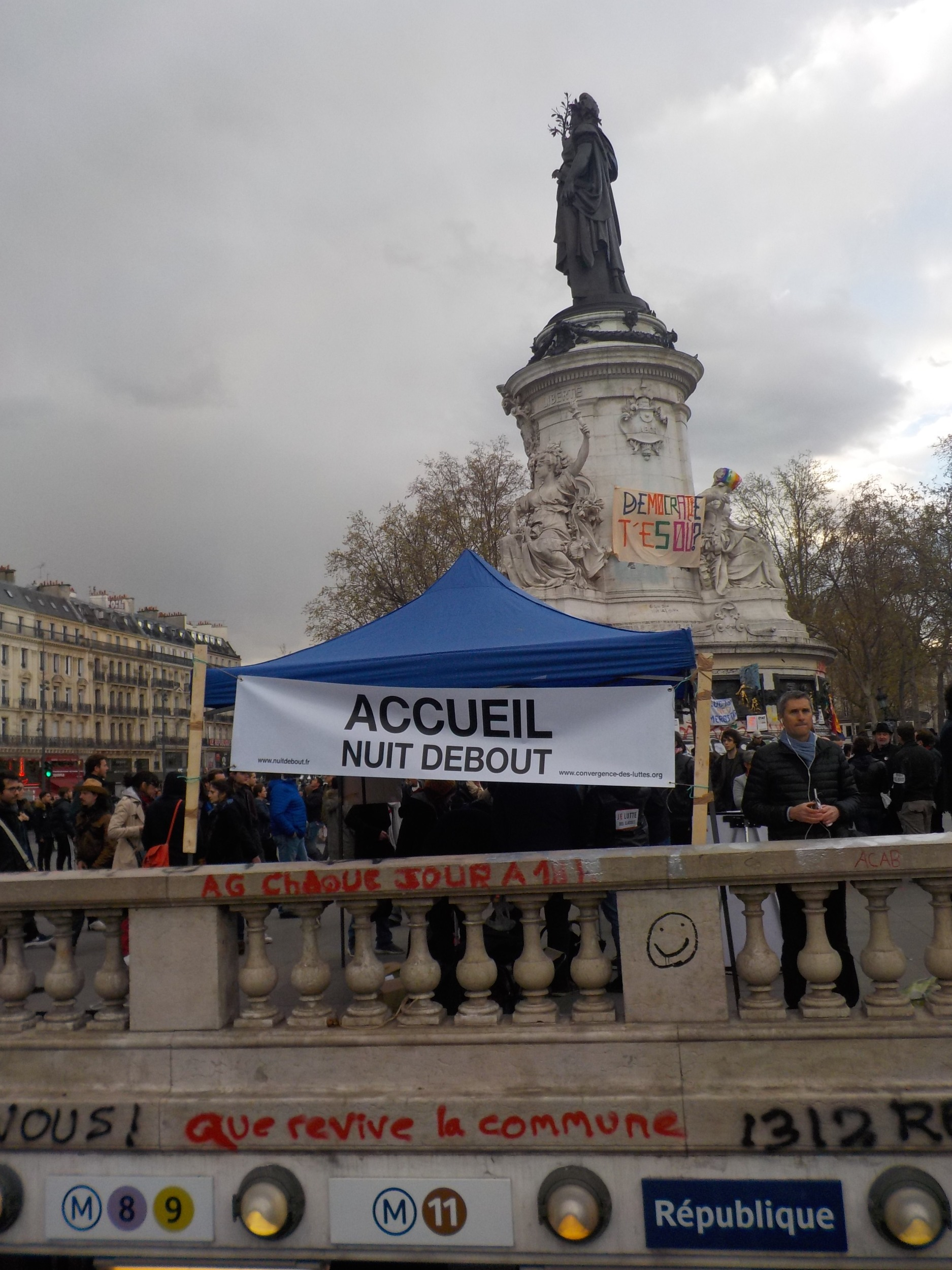
- Date: 31 March 2016 – June 2016
- Location: France and other countries
- Goals: Among others, withdrawal of proposed labor reforms
- Methods: Occupations of public squares; Public discussions

Nuit debout is a French social movement that began on 31 March 2016, arising out of protests against proposed labor reforms known as the El Khomri law or Loi travail. The movement was organized around a broad aim of "overthrowing the El Khomri bill and the world it represents". It has been compared to the Occupy movement in the United States and to Spain's anti-austerity 15-M or Indignados movement.

The movement began at the Place de la République in Paris, where protestors held nightly assemblies following the 31 March protest. The protests spread to dozens of other cities and towns in France as well as to neighbouring countries in Europe and to countries further afield. Turnout at these protests dwindled after the first weeks; activists maintained the movement's presence on the Internet.

== Name ==
Nuit debout has been translated into English as "up all night", "standing night", and "rise up at night", among other variants.

== Background ==
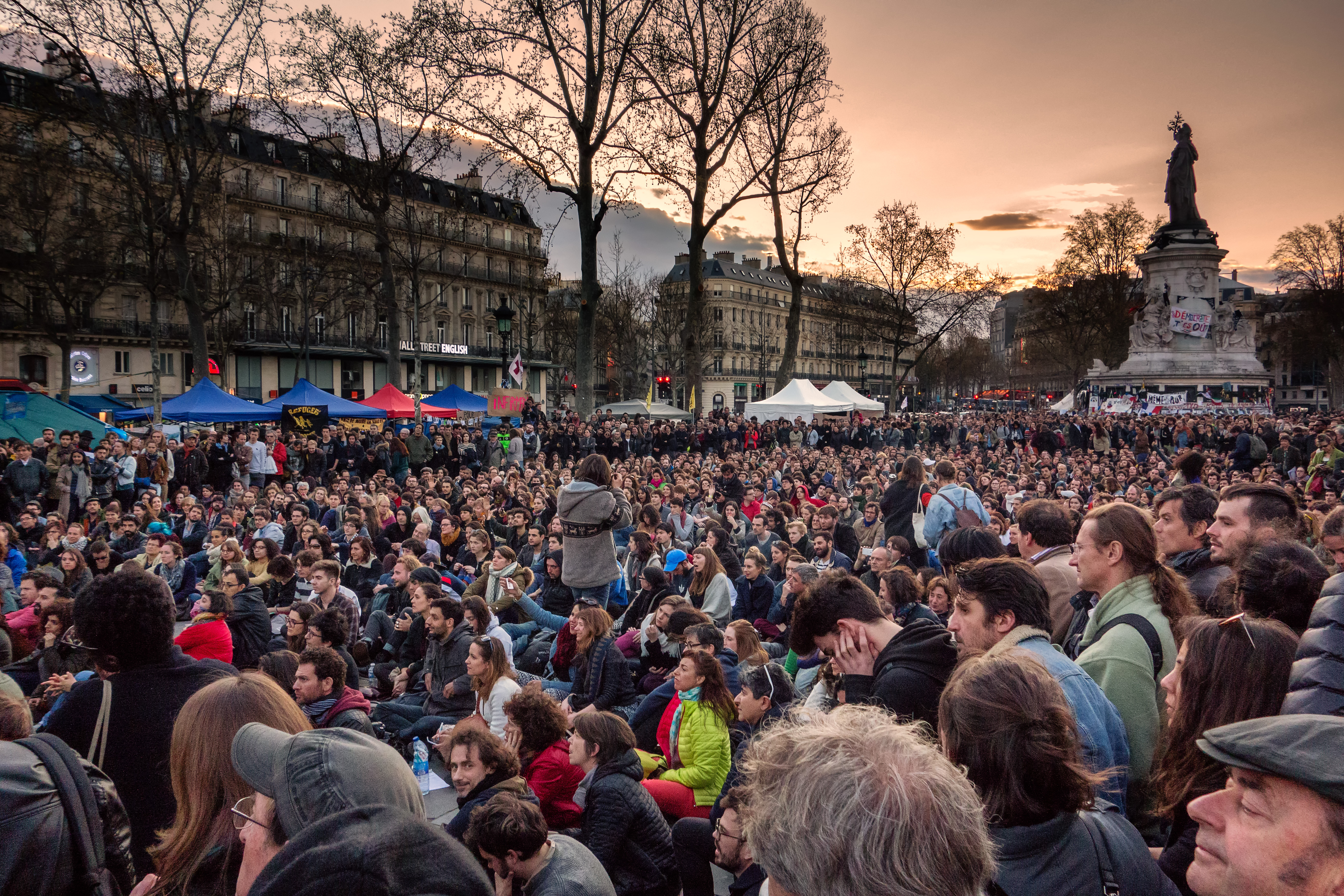
Protestors occupy the Place de la République in Paris, 10 April 2016

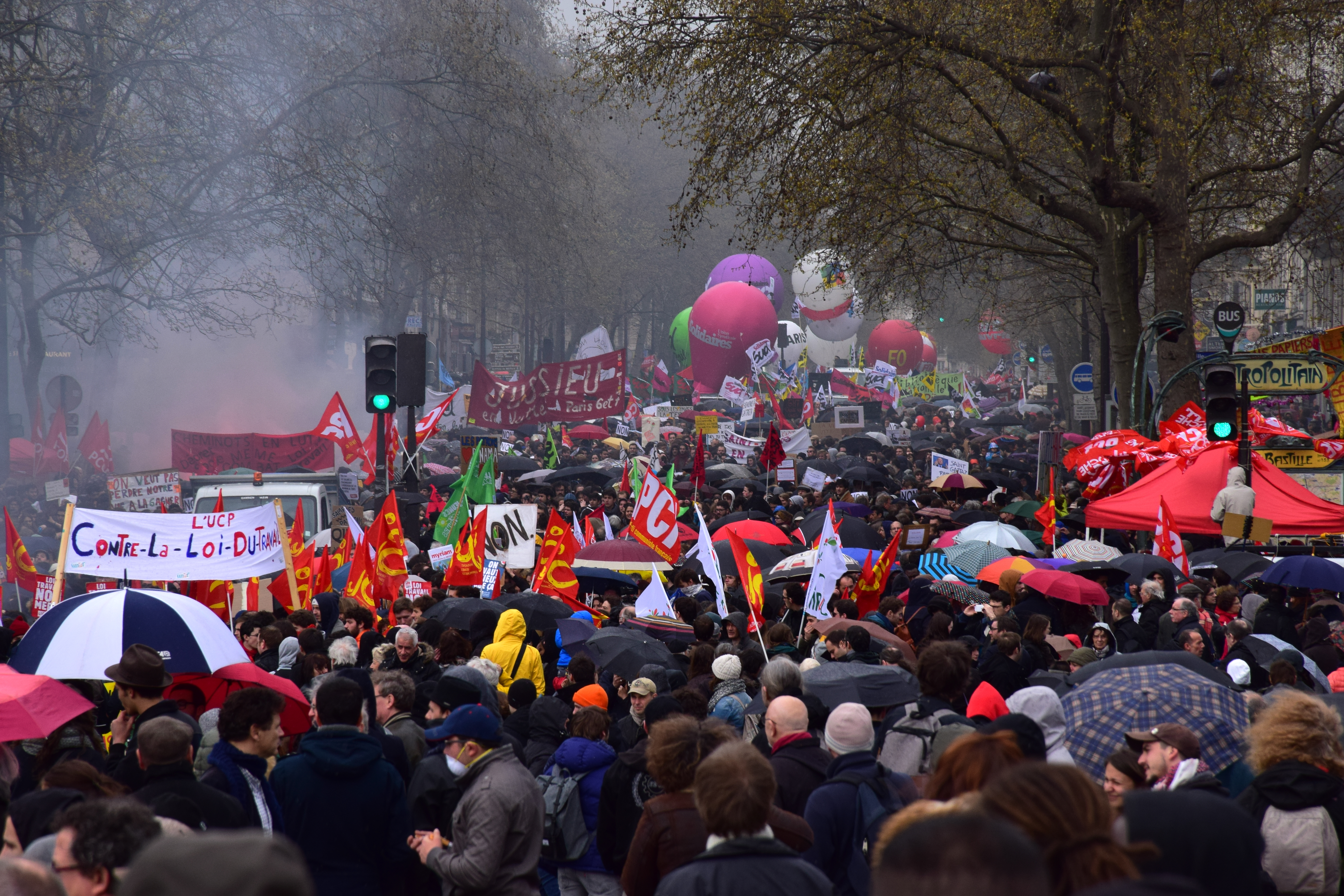
The government's proposed labor reforms provoked a series of large-scale street protests throughout the country.

In 2011, in the wake of the Great Recession, several developed countries saw the rise of civil disobedience movements protesting against issues such as inequality and corporate greed. In Spain, the 15-M or Indignados movement saw large-scale demonstrations and occupations of public squares; the movement led eventually to the rise of the anti-austerity political party Podemos. The United States saw the rise of Occupy Wall Street, in which protestors occupied Zuccotti Park in Lower Manhattan. In the wider Occupy movement, many major cities around the world saw similar protests. These movements inspired some protests in France at the time, such as an indignados-style protest at La Défense in November 2011. However, these protests had a limited impact in the country before 2016. The French commentator Pierre Haski explains:

The delayed reaction of the French youth has a lot to do with President François Hollande. In 2011 and 2012, when Occupy was the rallying cry of many cities, giving rise to political movements such as Podemos in Spain, the French were looking forward to electing a Socialist president instead of the highly unpopular Nicolas Sarkozy. Why occupy when the polls will do the job?

Over time, many in France became disappointed with Hollande's government, believing that it had failed to deliver on its promises. In particular, his government failed to reduce chronically high unemployment rates in the country: in early 2016 the rate was at 10.6 percent, up from 9 percent when Hollande took office, while the youth unemployment rate was above 25 percent. By early 2016, opinion polls said that four in five voters were opposed to Hollande running for re-election in 2017.

In an effort to reduce the unemployment rate, Hollande's government had embarked on a program of labor market liberalization. As part of this program, the government set out proposals, named after the Labor Minister Myriam El Khomri, designed to make France's labor market more flexible. If adopted, the El Khomri law would make sweeping changes to the country's labor code, with the effect of making it easier for companies to lay off workers, and loosening restrictions on working hours, including reducing overtime payments for hours worked beyond France's statutory 35-hour workweek. The changes would also reduce severance payments that workers are entitled to if their company has made them redundant.

The proposals were met with significant public resistance. The country's youth organizations and unions organized a series of large-scale street protests in opposition to the reforms, the first of which was held on 9 March 2016. The largest of these protests, on 31 March attracted 390,000 participants nationwide, according to the French authorities (unions put the figure at 1.2 million). According to the Belgian sociologist Geoffrey Pleyers, these demonstrations gained traction not just because of the unpopularity of the proposed changes to the labor code, but because of widespread opposition to the government's policies generally:

What distinguishes social movements from mere protests is that they have a larger purpose, not one specific demand. From the first meetings of university and high school students on 9 March the El Khomri law served as an opportunity to express general indignation. In protest leaflets, students called for resistance "against government policy" rather than just this one bill. During marches, protesters expressed their disappointment with the political left in general and the ruling Socialist Party in particular.

== Origins ==
The Nuit debout movement has its origins at a meeting held in Paris on 23 February 2016 which was organized by François Ruffin, the founder of the left-wing journal Fakir and the director of the documentary film Merci patron!. Ruffin stated that the aim of the meeting was to bring together a number of active protest groups, including people protesting against a proposed airport at Notre-Dame-des-Landes, factory workers protesting against the Goodyear tire company, and teachers protesting against education reforms. A retired delivery driver who attended the meeting was quoted as saying, "There were about 300 or 400 of us at a public meeting in February and we were wondering how can we really scare the government?. We had an idea: at the next big street protest, we simply wouldn't go home." Those attending the meeting agreed that they would occupy Paris's Place de la République on 31 March 2016, following organized street protests that were scheduled to take place on that day against the El Khomri law.

The organizers of the occupation refused to set out a specific list of political demands in advance, although they did denounce the government's proposed reforms as regressive, and they called for the construction of a new political project that would be "ambitious, progressive, and emancipatory". The economist Frédéric Lordon was invited to speak at the Place de la République on the evening of 31 March. He delivered a speech in which he highlighted the goal of uniting disparate protest movements.

== Events ==
=== Place de la République occupation ===
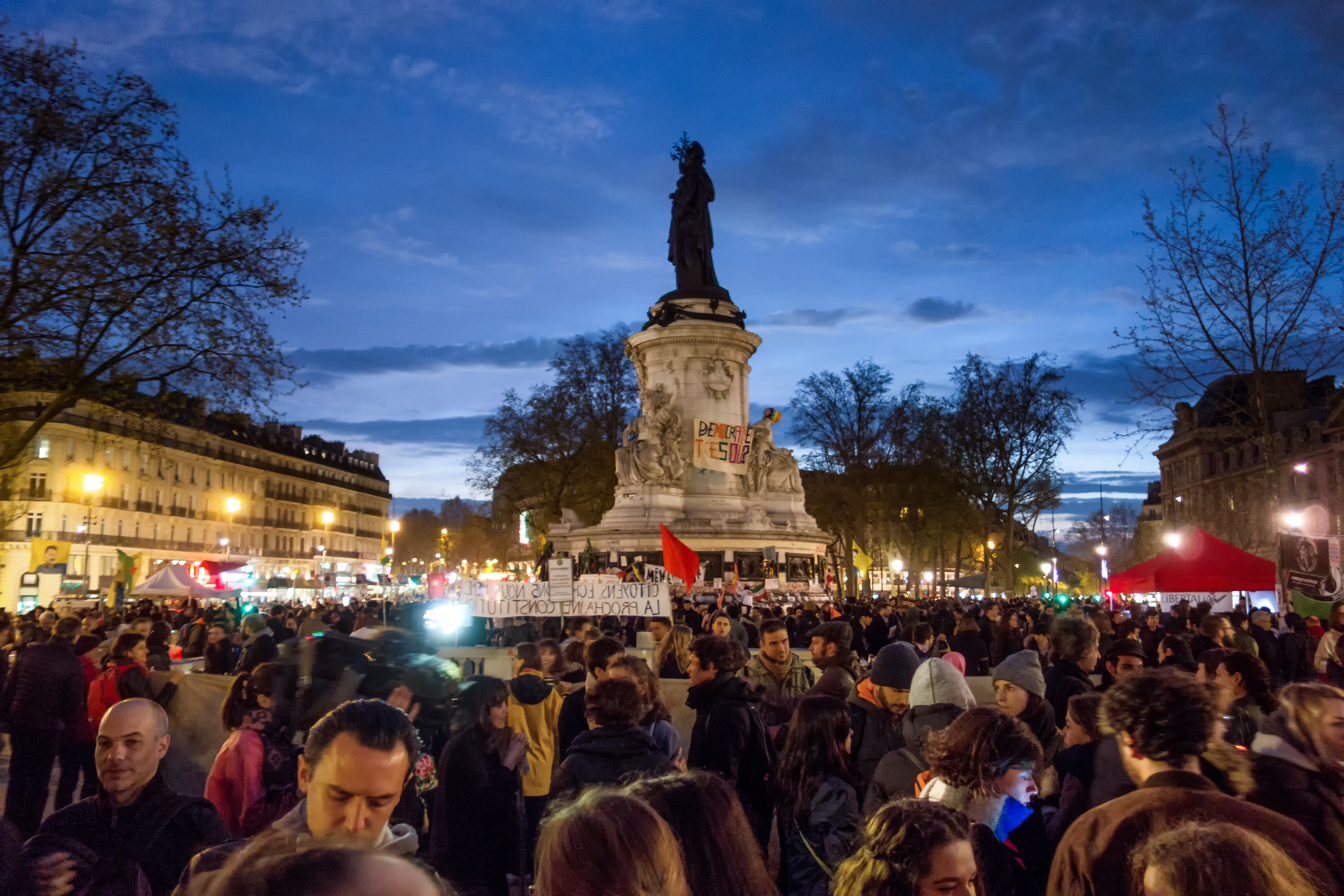
Following the initial protests on 31 March, protestors continued to gather each night in Paris's Place de la République.

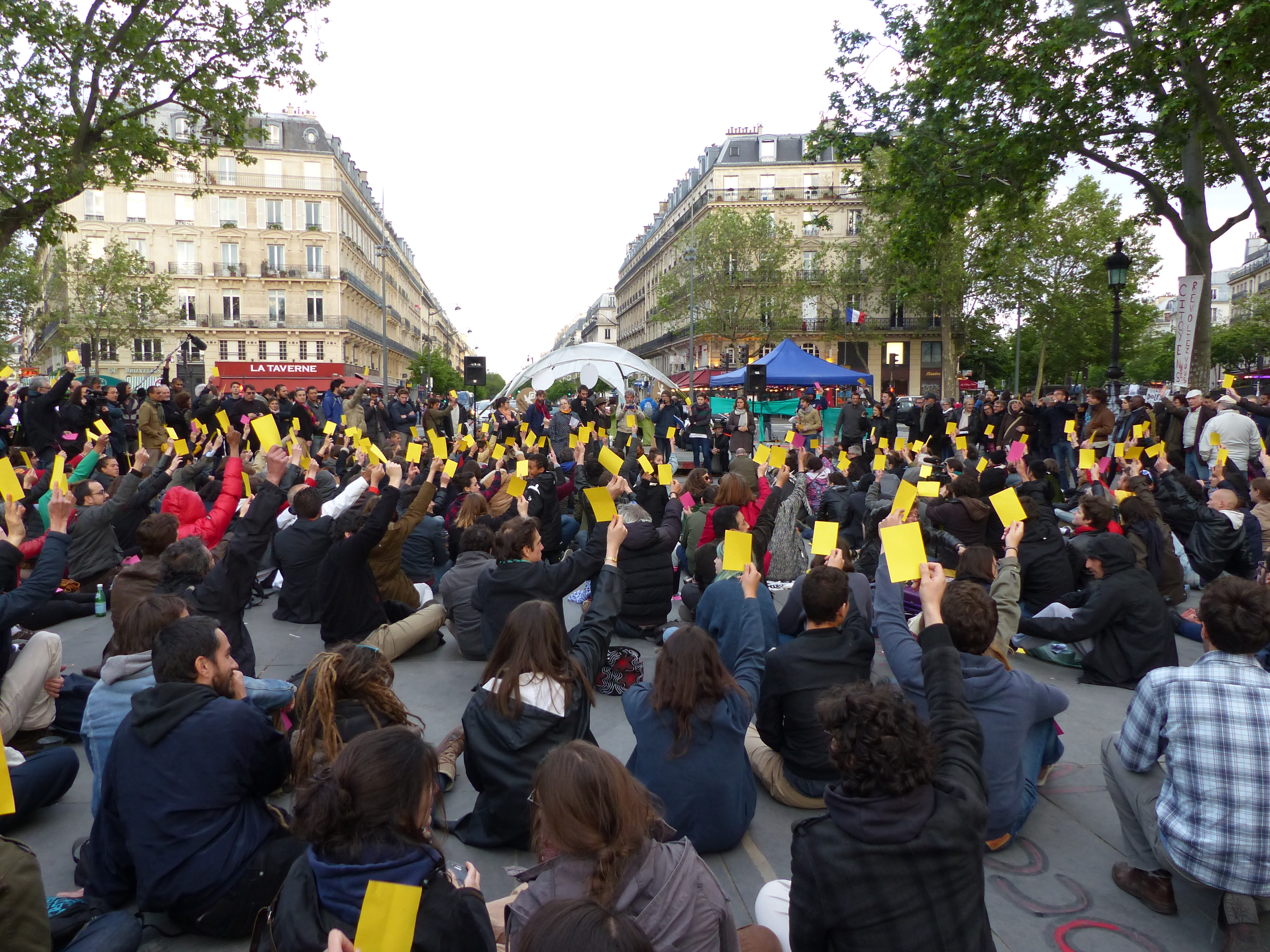
Voting at Global Debout

Following the initial night of occupation at the Place de la République, protesters continued to gather over the following days, defying a ban on mass demonstrations under the ongoing state of emergency declared by the government in the wake of the November 2015 Paris attacks. Participants began gathering every night at 6 p.m. to conduct a popular assembly (assemblée générale), individuals taking turns to speak for two minutes at a time. A system of hand gestures was established, with crowd members waving their fingers above their heads to indicate agreement, and crossing their wrists to indicate disagreement.

On the morning of Monday 11 April, the twelfth day of the protests, police evacuated the square, removing temporary structures that protestors had built, though protestors were given permission to return the same evening. The occupation of the square had earlier been criticized by politicians from France's two main parties. Valérie Pécresse, the Republican President of the Île-de-France region, declared that the square should either be evacuated, or that the protestors should police the square themselves. Anne Hidalgo, the Socialist Mayor of Paris, expressed her sympathy for the movement but warned the protestors against occupying the square during the daytime, saying that the square was a public space and that it should be available for the use of all members of the public.

On the evening of 14 April, President François Hollande participated in a televised interview, which was projected live on a giant screen in the Place de la République, in which he vowed to press ahead with the labor reforms. Following the interview, a group of protesters (300, according to the police) left the square in the direction of the Élysée Palace, the president's official residence. The protestors were diverted by the police and eventually dispersed. Several banks, commercial premises, and vehicles were vandalized, and there were some violent clashes between protestors and security forces. In the days following these events, the movement failed to adopt a collective position distancing itself from these actions. A substantial majority of participants at the Place de la République, however, declared themselves opposed to violent protest.

=== Occupations in France ===
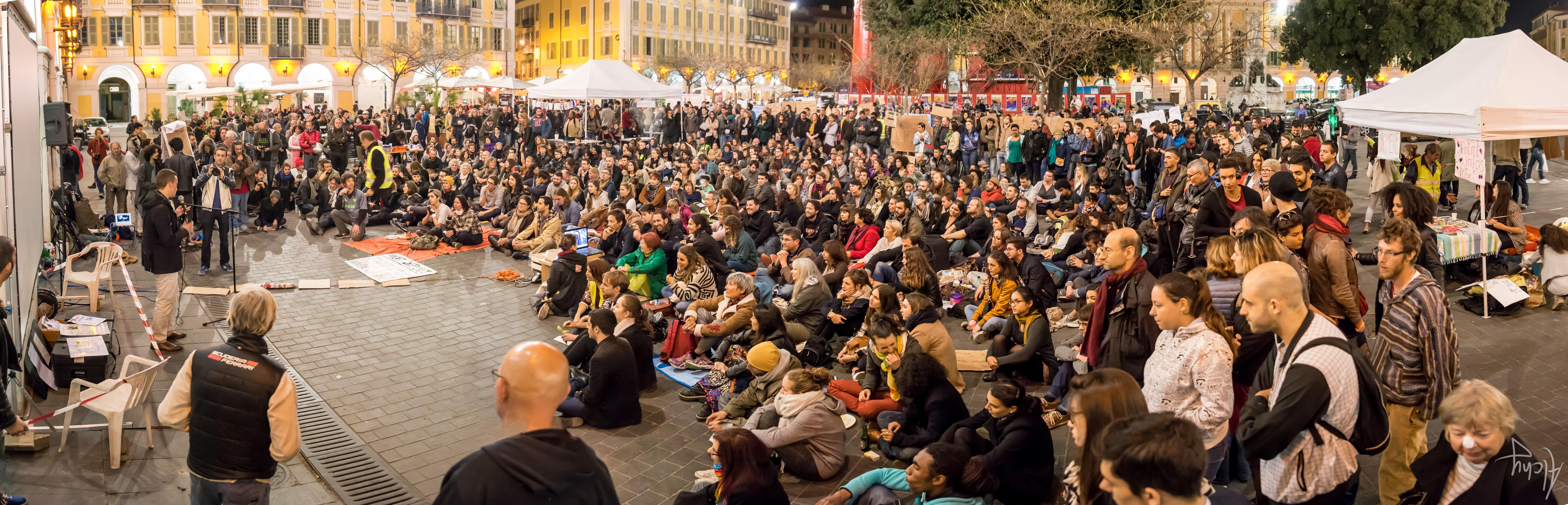
A popular assembly held at a Nuit debout gathering in Nice, 15 March 2016

Over the first week the protests spread to over 30 cities across France. The academic David Graeber, a leading figure in the Occupy Wall Street protests of 2011, said that the protests had spread much faster than those of 2011. Explaining the spread of the protests, Graeber was quoted as saying, "There seems to be this sense of betrayal. [It's] the fact that it is an ostensibly left-wing government that did the state of emergency, that did the labor law, that's done a whole series of different things. These [the protestors] are the people that voted for them… [They] assumed that such a government would somehow speak for their concerns. They're just really pissed off."

During the first two weeks, assemblies took place mostly in city center locations, and some critics accused the movement of being predominantly white, bourgeois, and unrepresentative of the wider population. In response to this concern, participants in Paris argued in favor of expanding the movement into the banlieues. Several Nuit debout events were held in Paris suburbs such as Saint-Denis and Saint-Ouen in mid-April, however these failed to attract local participants in large numbers. An event organized in the northern parts of Marseille on 23 April likewise failed to greatly engage the local population. Activists suggested that the movement's message, such as its opposition to changes to the labor code, had little traction in the area because many residents there were already unemployed, and because such areas had for decades been marginalized and ignored by wider society.

=== Protests spread outside France ===
The movement quickly spread to neighbouring countries in Europe. Within the first ten days, protests were held in cities including Brussels, Berlin, Lisbon, and Madrid. On 22 April 2016, around 200 people gathered in Montreal, Quebec, Canada to conduct a general assembly. Participants discussed issues surrounding the environment, feminism, and indigenous people's rights, as well as economic issues including the fight for a $15 minimum wage. An event was organized in Glasgow, Scotland on 2 May; its organizers suggested that trade unions should get involved, stating that the movement "presents a great opportunity for unions to adapt to the twenty-first century".

Nuit debout's organizers called for a global day of protests, under the name Global debout, to take place on Sunday, 15 May, a date chosen to coincide with the fifth anniversary of the Spanish Indignados movement. Events were scheduled to take place in 266 locations in France, and in 130 cities outside France, across 28 countries. Turnout on the day was low: in Brussels around 150 people participated; in Berlin the number was around 100; in Paris's Place de la République around 1,500 people attended.

== Themes ==
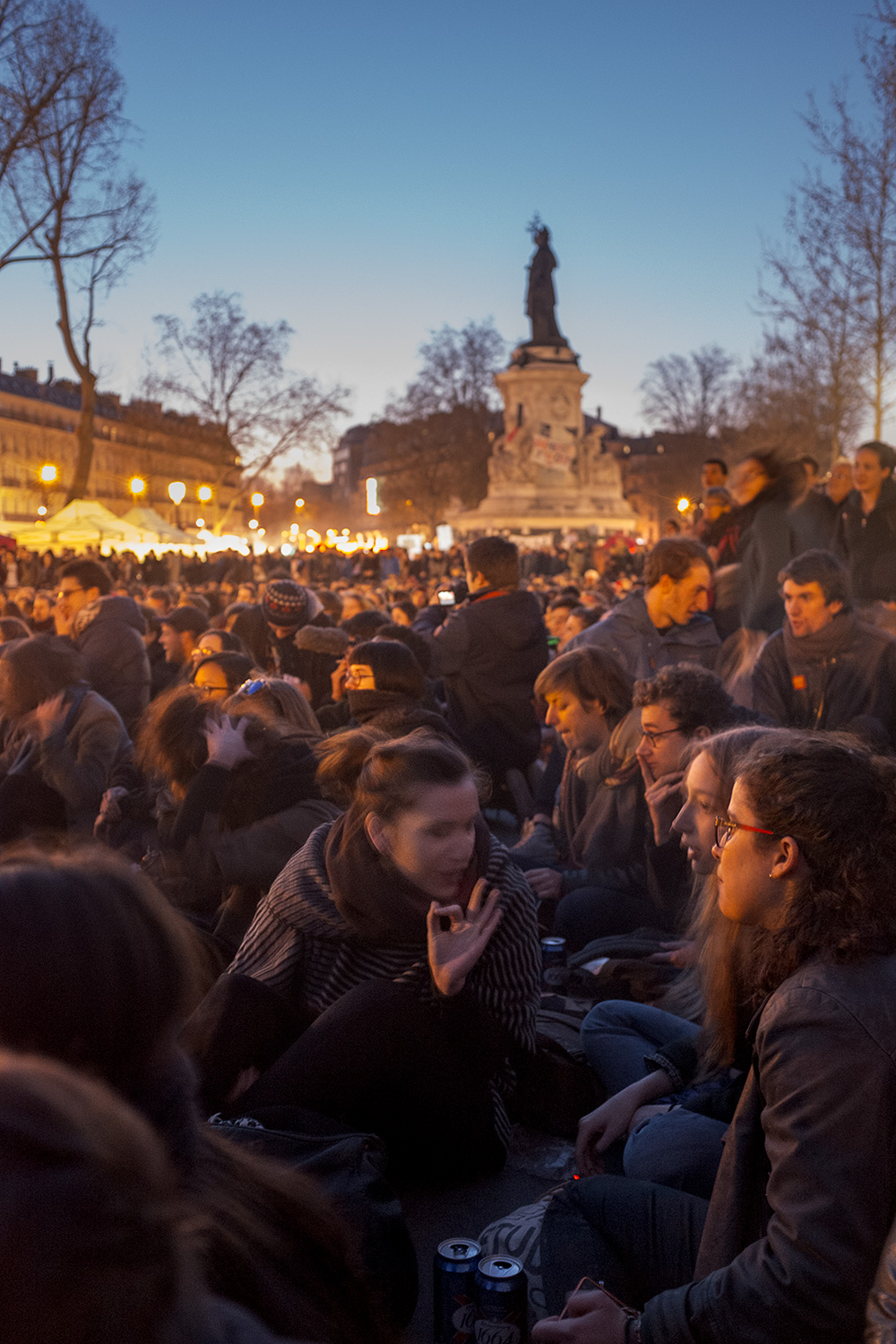
The young occupants of the Place de la République remake the world (29 March)

While the initial street protests arose out of opposition to the El Khomri labor reforms, the Nuit debout movement itself coalesced from the beginning around a much broader set of themes. Among recurring themes of discussion are: calls for a universal basic income; opposition to labor arrangements which place workers in competition with one another, as enshrined in trade treaties such as the Transatlantic Trade and Investment Partnership; amnesty for undocumented migrants and solidarity with refugees; and feminist issues including the gender pay gap and the safety of sex workers.

Some within the movement have called for a general strike along the lines of previous major strikes in France, in 1936 and in May 1968, with the aim of forcing the withdrawal of the El Khomri law. Frédéric Lordon has argued that the movement should seek to rewrite the French constitution, abolishing private ownership of the means of production as enshrined in the existing constitution, and granting ownership instead to those who derive use value from capital. A discussion group was set up in the Place de la République on the question of what should be included in such a rewritten constitution; some suggested that government should be selected by sortition, or that elected officials should be subject to recall by voters.

As with the French Revolution, the movement rewrote the calendar: all dates following the 31 March protest were renamed as a continuation of the month of March. 7 April, for example, is 38 mars, or 38 March.

== Radio debout, TV debout, and alternative media channels ==
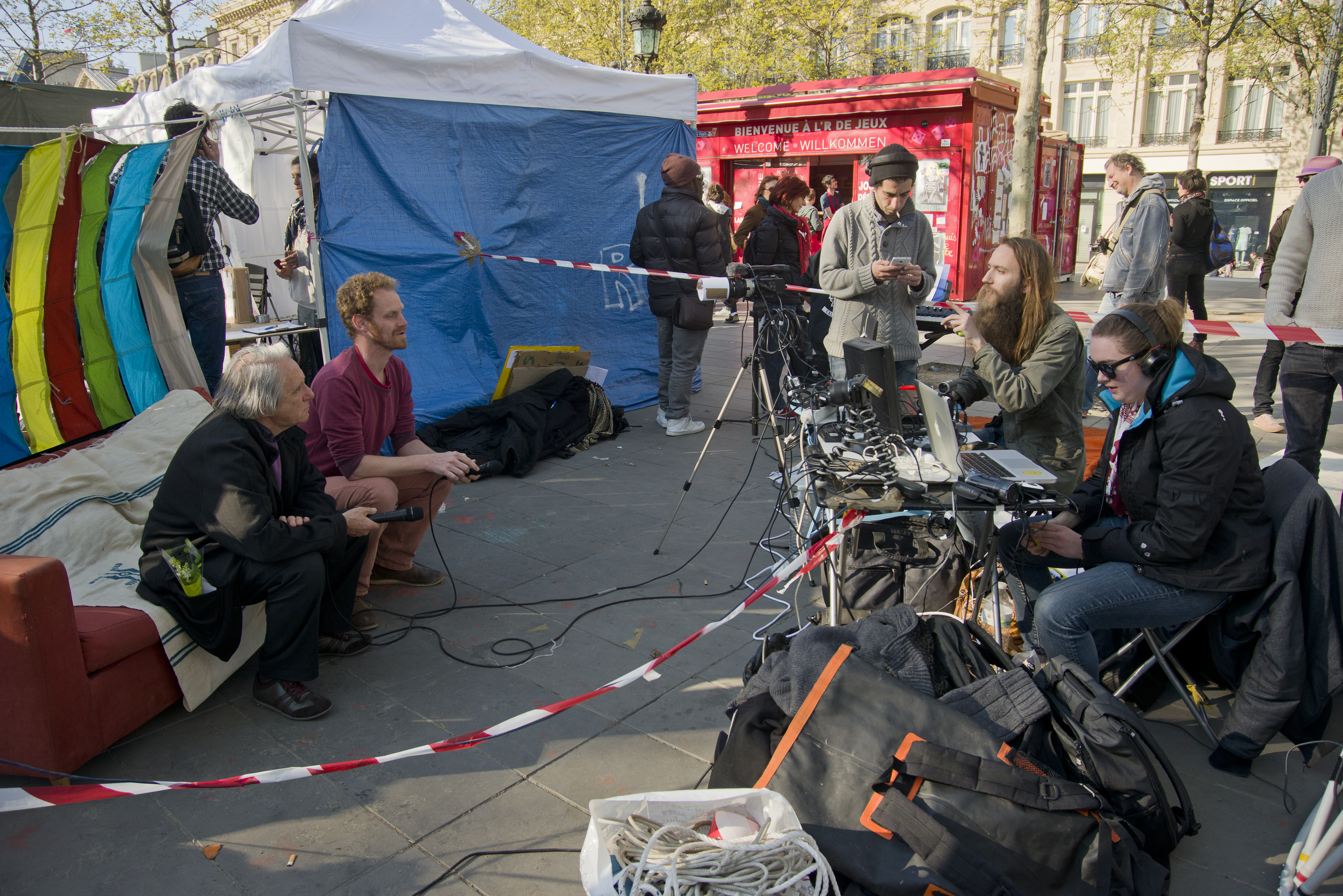
French philosopher Jacques Rancière being interviewed by protestors, who set up their own TV station broadcasting over the Internet from Paris's Place de la République

Protestors in the movement have declared themselves wary of mainstream media coverage, preferring to communicate via alternative channels. In Paris's Place de la République, activists set up their own radio and TV stations, broadcasting over the Internet. The initial set-up for Radio debout involved a table, four chairs, three microphones, a mixing desk, two computers, and a 4G USB stick. It was set up by individuals with a background working for France's national radio stations, and streamed on the site Mixlr.

TV debout, meanwhile, was set up with the intention of broadcasting the general assemblies taking places in the square, interspersed with interviews and analysis. The interviews were initially conducted on a white sofa with a cardboard sign suspended in the background with the letters of "TV debout" cut out. The channel was streamed over YouTube.

Other channels of communication established by the movement include a newspaper titled 20 mille luttes, and various Facebook and Twitter accounts. In addition, several people began live-streaming events over the smartphone app Periscope. The most notable of these is Rémy Buisine, a 25-year-old online community manager whose stream attracted as many as 80,000 viewers simultaneously on the evening of 3 April. Buisine presents himself as independent of the movement, and as a neutral observer of events.

== Reactions ==
=== Public opinion ===
The movement received broad public support, with polls showing that a majority of the French public held a favourable view towards it. A survey conducted by the polling agency Odoxa on behalf of the television news channel i-Télé, and published on 9 April 2016, found that 71% of respondents had heard of the movement, and that 60% supported it. An Ifop poll of 18–25-year-olds, published by Metronews on 13 April indicated that 61% of this age group supported the movement, and that 47% declared themselves willing to participate in it. A later Odoxa poll, published on 15 May, found that the movement had lost some support among the public, with 49% of respondents saying they supported the movement.

=== Media coverage ===
The French media analysis organization Acrimed likewise criticized French media coverage of the movement, suggesting that many journalists were only interested in covering the movement in order to discredit it. In particular, the organization pointed to media coverage of an incident involving the philosopher Alain Finkielkraut, who was videoed being heckled by protesters at the Place de la République. Acrimed criticized journalists for reporting the incident without verifying the facts, and argued that coverage of the incident was disproportionate and that the media had failed to provide a similar level of information about the movement itself: about the movement's demands, or about its existence outside Paris.

Laurent Joffrin, in an editorial for the left-leaning newspaper Libération written shortly after the Finkielkraut incident, defended his own paper's coverage of the movement, pointing out that its reporters had repeatedly been sent to document the debates taking place at the popular assemblies in Paris. He suggested that Nuit debout had benefited from a degree of media goodwill out of proportion to the size of the movement.

=== Politicians' reactions ===
During its first month, the movement received support from politicians on the left of the political spectrum, while being condemned by parties on the right. The governing left-of-center Socialist Party broadly called for the movement to be tolerated. Emmanuel Macron is a supporter of the law. He became the most vocal proponent of the economic overhaul of the country.

On 11 April, Socialist Prime Minister Manuel Valls met with the country's student leaders, offering concessions on the proposed labor reforms in an effort to defuse the protests, saying, "The government is listening. It understands the youths' worries." The concessions included between €400 million and €500 million in aid for job seekers and other state support. In a televised interview broadcast on 14 April 2016, President François Hollande vowed to press ahead with the proposed labor reforms. During the interview, Hollande said of the movement, "I find it legitimate that the youth - in relation to the world as it is, in relation to politics as they are - want to express themselves and want to have their say."

On 10 May, facing opposition to the El Khomri law from a group of his own MPs, Prime Minister Valls announced that the government planned to force the bill through parliament without a vote, using Article 49.3 of the French Constitution. The measure forces a vote of confidence in the government itself, meaning that in order to prevent the bill from being passed the Socialist Party's rebels would have to vote in favour of toppling their own government. Hundreds of Nuit debout participants gathered outside France's National Assembly to protest the move. Similar protests occurred in other cities in France. Nuit debout's organizers called the move "an insult to the people of this country", while a number of unions called for further days of strike action. The government survived the confidence vote on 12 May, meaning that the labor bill would be passed directly to the Senate, France's upper house, for debate.

== See also ==
- 2023 French pension reform strikes
- Arson attacks in Grenoble
- Yellow vests protests
