= Research in Social Stratification and Mobility =

- Discipline: Sociology
- Language: English
- Edited by: Meir Yaish

Publication details
- History: 1981–present
- Publisher: Elsevier
- Frequency: Annual
- Impact factor: 1.033 (2016)

Standard abbreviations
- ISO 4: Res. Soc. Stratif. Mobil.

Indexing
- ISSN: 0276-5624
- LCCN: 81640961
- OCLC no.: 300032923

Links
- Journal homepage; Online archive

Research in Social Stratification and Mobility is an annual peer-reviewed academic journal covering sociological research on social stratification and inequality. It was established in 1981 and is published by Elsevier on behalf of the International Sociological Association's Research Committee 28 (abbreviated RC28) on Social Stratification and Mobility, of which it is the official journal. The editor-in-chief is Meir Yaish (University of Haifa). According to the Journal Citation Reports, the journal has a 2016 impact factor of 1.033.
