= Debout! =

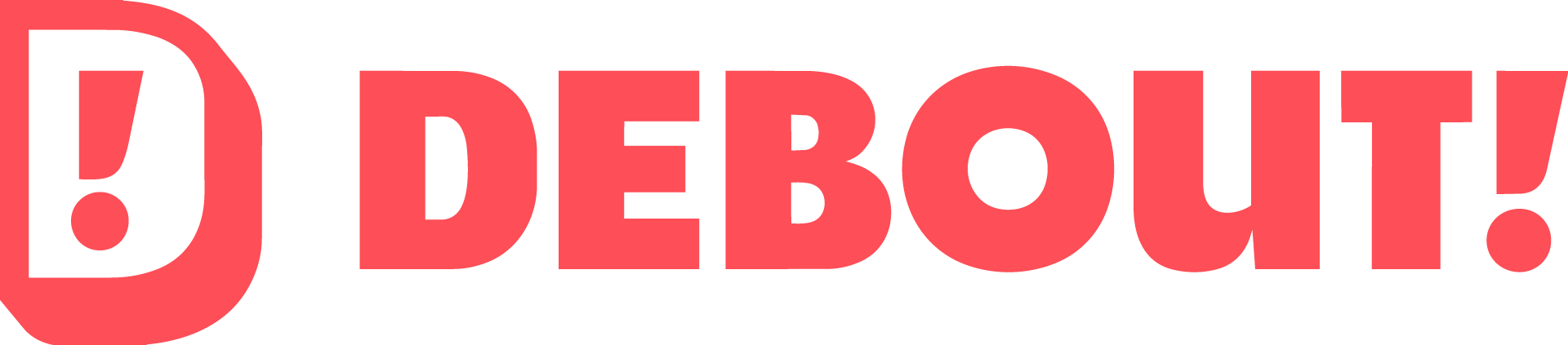
- Abbreviation: D!
- Leader: François Ruffin
- Founded: 17 February 2017 (As Picardie Debout!); 28 June 2025 (As Debout!)
- Split from: La France Insoumise
- Ideology: Left-wing populism Economic nationalism Formerly; Picardy regionalism
- Political position: Left-wing
- National affiliation: Rassemblement pour Gagner! (2025–present); New Popular Front (2024-present); La France Insoumise (2017–2024); NUPES (2022–2024)
- Colors: Red
- Slogan: They have the money, we have the people
- National Assembly: 2 / 577
- Regional council: 1 / 1,926

Website
- debout.fr

Debout! (D!, Stand Up!) is a French political party and movement founded by François Ruffin in 2017 and registered in 2019. Initially named Picardie Debout!, it changed its name in June 2025 in order to prepare for the 2027 French presidential election.

== History ==
=== Background ===
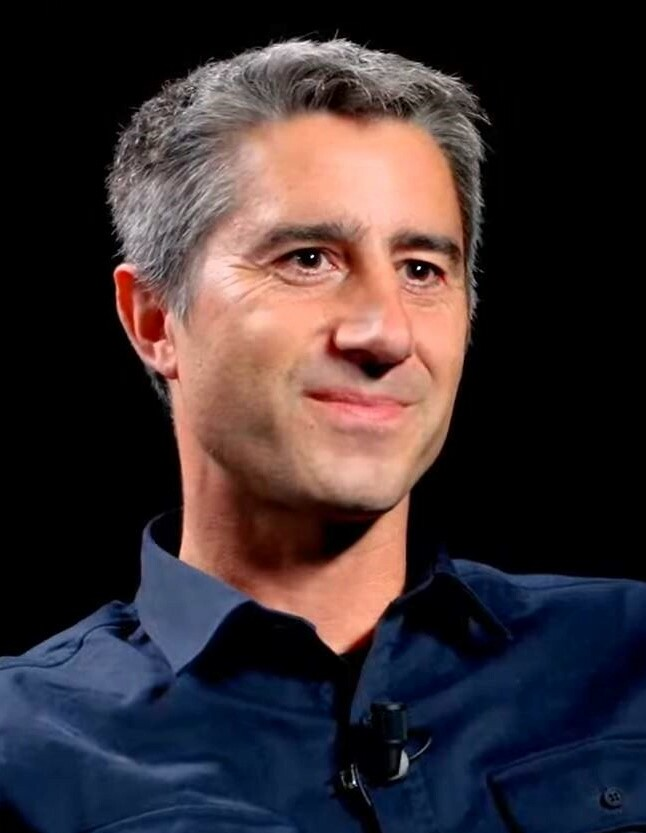
Founder of Debout!, François Ruffin

In 2016, filmmaker and journalist François Ruffin announced his candidacy for the 1st constituency of Somme. His programme was inspired by La France Insoumise, the French Communist Party and Europe Ecology The Greens.

Ruffin qualified for the second round of voting with 24.32% of the vote behind Nicolas Dumont of La République en marche! (LREM) with 34.13% of the vote.. Going into the second round Ruffin received the support of La France Insoumise and the support of defeated incumbent, Pascale Boistard of the Socialist Party.

Francois Ruffin was elected in the 1st constituency of the Somme with 55.97% of the vote marking the first deputy to be elected for or supported by LFI in that election.

=== Picarde Debout! ===
With the launch of Ruffin's campaign, he also launched a new movement, Picardie Debout!, a left-wing regionalist movement.

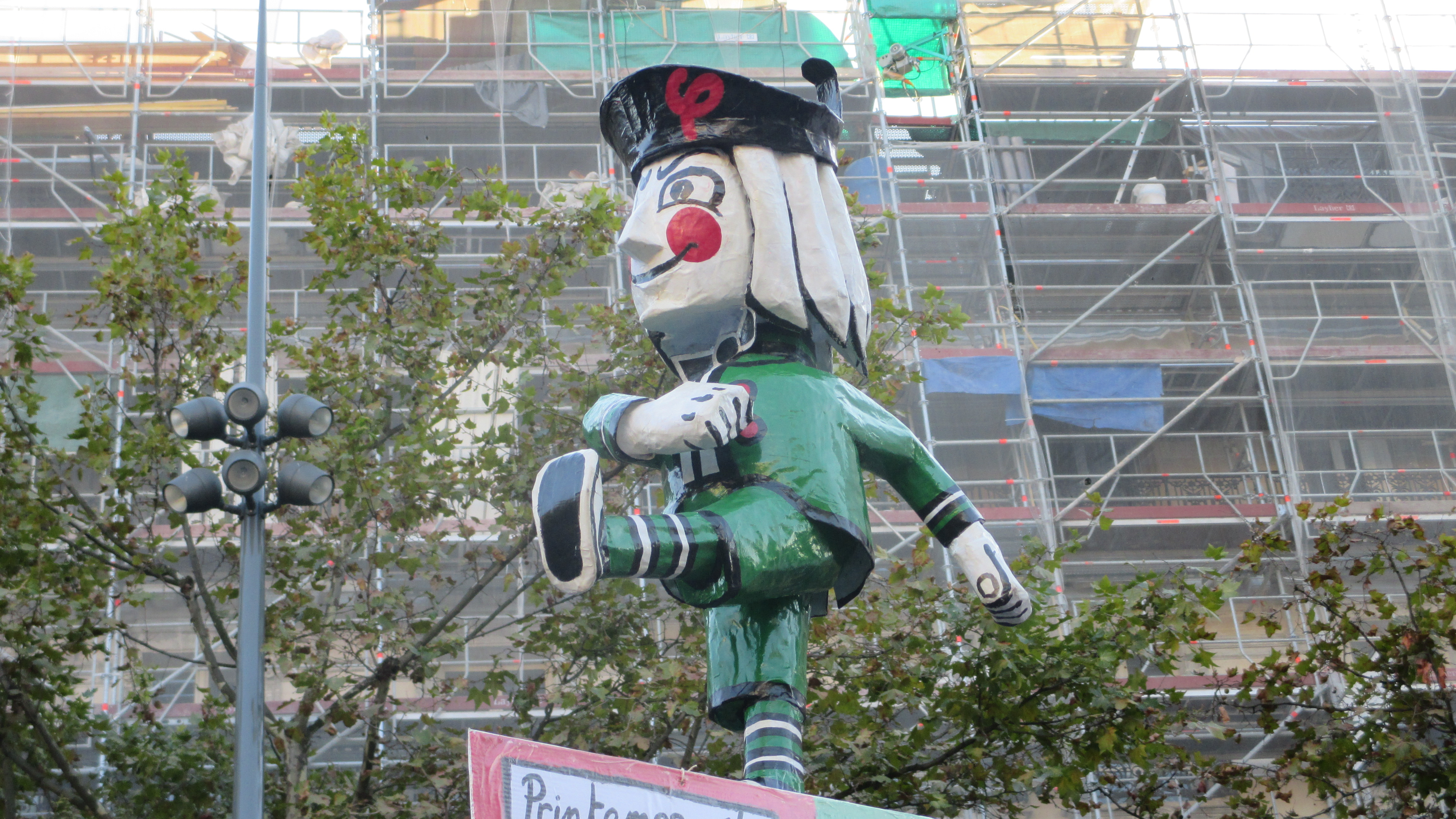
The Lafeur, a symbol of Picardie Debout!

In 2019, Picardie Debout! was registered as a political party, with Isabelle Guyot as its president.

In the 2022 French legislative election, Picardie Debout! presented two candidates in the Somme, Ruffin in the 1st constituency and Guillaume Ancelet in the 5th constituency.

Ruffin was re-elected with 61.01% of the vote and Ancelet lost to National Rally's Yaël Ménache in the second round with 39.21 of the vote.

In the 2024 French legislative election, Ruffin ran as the party's only candidate under the banner of the New Popular Front and won against the candidate of National Rally with 52.95% of the votes. However, he ran a second round campaign distancing and alienating himself from Jean-Luc Mélenchon, the leader of La France Insoumise.

=== Debout! and break with La France Insoumise ===
After the legislative elections, Ruffin began associating himself with the rebellious deputies, Alexis Corbière, Clémentine Autain, Hendrik Davi and Danielle Simonnet, who had just formed a political party, L'Après, and joined the Ecologist Group with the other rebellious deputies.

In 2025, L'Apres, Debout! and Generation.s formed an electoral alliance, Rassemblement pour Gagner!

In June 2025, Ruffin launched Debout! in the 13th arrondissement of Paris as a nationalised version of Picardie Debout! with the hopes of forming a long-term left-wing alliance.

This announcement was also in preparation of the 2026 United Left primary where on the 26th of January 2026, Ruffin announced his candidacy for the Primary. After the cancellation of the primary, Ruffin declared himself a candidate for the presidential election.

In the 2026 French municipal elections, former president of the party, Guillaume Ancelet was elected mayor of Rosières-en-Santerre. Multiple other mayors affiliated with, or supporters of the movement were elected. The party also obtained multiple municipal councillors including in the cities of Nantes and Amiens.

Deputy Sophie Taillé-Polian of Generation.s joined the movement and Ruffin's presidential campaign as a spokesperson.

== Election results ==
National Assembly
Election year	Leader	1st round votes	%	2nd round votes	%	Seats	+/–
2017	François Ruffin	15,081		19,329		1 / 577	New
2022 (Note: Within NUPES)	François Ruffin	23,022	0.1%	33,184	0.16%	1 / 577	Steady
2024 (Note: Within NFP)	François Ruffin	17,850	0.06%	27,108	0.1%	1 / 577	Steady

== See also ==
- La France Insoumise
- L'Après
- New Popular Front
