= François Ruffin =

French journalist and politician (born 1975)

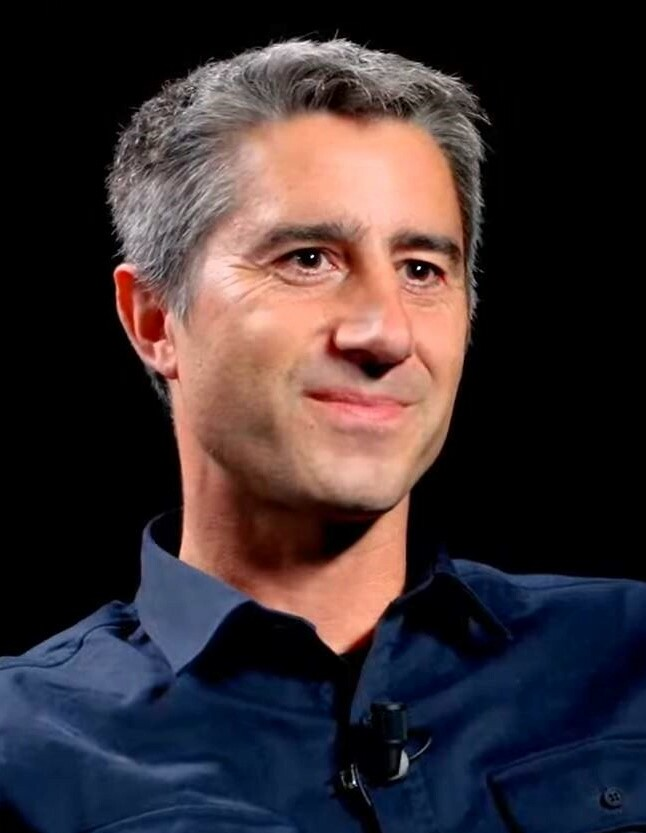
- Ruffin in 2022

Member of the National Assembly for Somme's 1st constituency
- Incumbent
- Assumed office 21 June 2017
- Preceded by: Pascale Boistard

Personal details
- Born: François Marcel Joseph Bernard Ruffin; 18 October 1975 (age 51) Calais, France
- Party: Debout! (since 2017)
- Other political affiliations: La France Insoumise (2017–2024)
- Occupation: Journalist • Film director

François Marcel Joseph Bernard Ruffin (French: [fʁɑ̃swa maʁsɛl ʒozɛf bɛʁnaʁ ʁyfɛ̃]; born 18 October 1975) is a French journalist, filmmaker, author and politician. The editor-in-chief of the satirical quarterly Fakir, which he founded, he is best known for directing the 2016 film Merci patron! as well as for playing an instrumental role in the formation of the Nuit debout movement in France.

Ruffin has held the seat for Somme's 1st constituency in the National Assembly since 2017. Ahead of the 2017 legislative election, he created the regional political party Picardie Debout ("Arise Picardy") and ran as its sole candidate, with the initial support of La France Insoumise, Europe Ecology – The Greens and the French Communist Party in the first round, before that of the Socialist Party's candidate in the second round. Upon his election, he joined the La France Insoumise group; becoming de facto associated with that political party, although often dissenting from its mainstream.

Ruffin was a central organizer of the New Popular Front alliance formed for the 2024 legislative election. During the campaign, he broke ties with La France Insoumise and Jean-Luc Mélenchon amidst a "purge" of key party members. After being narrowly re-elected, he joined the Ecologist Group in the National Assembly.

== Life and career ==
Ruffin was born in Calais on 18 October 1975, and grew up in Amiens. His father worked for the French vegetable processing company Bonduelle and his mother was a housewife. Ruffin was educated at a private Catholic lycée, the Jesuit institute Lycée la Providence, alongside Emmanuel Macron who was two years his junior.

In 1999, Ruffin founded an ultra-leftist newspaper called Fakir, and the following year entered journalism school at the Centre de formation des journalistes in Paris. In 2003 he published a book, Les Petits Soldats du journalisme, in which he drew on his experiences at journalism school. He was critical of the method by which journalists are trained, arguing that it leaves no room for political engagement or for critical opposition to capitalism.

Ruffin's investigative journalism work has focused on the behaviour of multinational companies. He has developed a technique for questioning the CEO's of these companies. He buys shares in the company and then attends the shareholders' annual general meeting, this being often the only way a journalist is able to make contact with the CEO. He has published his work in Le Monde diplomatique as well as in the pages of Fakir; he has also reported for the France Inter radio programme Là-bas si j'y suis.

=== Merci patron! and Nuit debout ===
The documentary film Merci patron!, released nationally in France in February 2016, which he directed, is a product of his earlier journalism work. In the film, Ruffin takes on the case of Jocelyn and Serge Klur, both textile workers who have been made redundant, the factory where they worked having been relocated to Poland. The factory had been run by a company owned by Bernard Arnault, France's richest man. The film follows Ruffin's efforts to force Arnault to pay back the Klurs for "ruining their lives". Before making the film, Ruffin had been investigating Arnault's business affairs for several years, and he met the Klurs in the course of his investigations. Economist Frédéric Lordon described Merci patron! as a direct action film. Ruffin has said he was inspired by the American filmmaker Michael Moore and subsequently nicknamed as such. The film received positive reviews in the French press and was a box office success, initially receiving attention almost entirely by word of mouth.

The Nuit debout movement arose as a result of events surrounding the film. In a piece written for Le Monde diplomatique, Frédéric Lordon described the film as a clarion call for a potential mass uprising. In response to this piece, and recognising the enthusiastic public response to advanced screenings of the film, Ruffin organised a meeting in Paris on 23 February 2016 to discuss future political actions. He has said that the aim of the meeting was to bring together a number of disparate protest groups, including people protesting against a proposed airport at Notre-Dame-des-Landes, factory workers protesting against the Goodyear tire company, and teachers protesting against education reforms. A retired delivery driver who attended the meeting was quoted as saying, "There were about 300 or 400 of us at a public meeting in February and we were wondering how can we really scare the government?. We had an idea: at the next big street protest, we simply wouldn’t go home." As a result of the meeting, an occupation was arranged for Paris's Place de la République, to take place on the evening of 31 March 2016, under the name Nuit debout, following scheduled street protests earlier in the day against the government's proposed labour reforms. In the days following this event, protests continued, spreading to other cities throughout France and into neighbouring countries in Europe.

=== 2017 legislative elections ===
In November 2016, Ruffin announced that he would run for the National Assembly in the departement of Somme's 1st constituency, an area where the far-right National Front had gained in traction and popularity. His political platform was one inspired by those of La France Insoumise, the French Communist Party, and Europe Ecology – The Greens. He pledges to adhere to the principles of a "revocable mandate" and to only keep a minimum wage of his salary. He officially launched his campaign on 17 February 2017, at Flixecourt, France. Employees of the Whirlpool plant in Amiens are present, to bring attention to the situation of their factory, whose management has announced the closure and relocation in Poland.

His campaign slogan is "They have the money, we have the people" and he symbolizes his campaign the Lafleur puppet, ingrained in Picardy's culture, and names his micro-political party Picardie Debout, which can be translated as Arise Picardy. For the first electoral round, his campaign received the support of La France Insoumise, the French Communist Party and Europe Ecology—The Greens. On 11 June, he qualified for the second round of the legislative elections with 24.32% of the votes cast, coming second behind En Marche! candidate Nicolas Dumont, credited with 34.13% of the vote. In the second round, the incumbent and disqualified Socialist Party candidate Pascale Boistard also endorsed Ruffin's candidacy. He received 55.97% of the votes cast in the runoff against Dumont and was elected.

=== 2027 presidential election ===
Ruffin is a candidate of the 2026 United Left primary for the 2027 French presidential election.

== Political positions ==
Ideologically, Ruffin has described himself as being a social democrat. He has justified this position by repeatedly calling out those in French politics and saying that those that describes themselves as social democrats, primarily directed towards the Socialist Party, the tenure of Francois Hollande, and more generally the policies that the party has applied since 1983, are "no longer social nor democratic".

In February 2023, Ruffin said that he would describe himself with the oxymoron "revolutionary-reformist". He explained this position by saying that through reformism, the working class can make step by step progress until it is confident enough to look out to "the horizon", with the horizon in this case being socialism. He further explains that within the oxymoron, reformism is the first step, and revolution is the horizon. Ruffin supports the need for economic protectionism and details this point of view in his 2011 book Their Big Scare: Diary of my Protectionist Impulses. He is in favor of the doctrine of degrowth, as opposed to productivism.

Ruffin regularly insists on the need to establish the junction between the two electorate hearts of the left, namely the working class, associated with the workers and trade unions on one side, and the intellectuals and professionals of the education on the other, because according to him, only the "convergence of struggles" can lead to a social movement of sufficient magnitude to achieve change. To do this, he seeks in particular to fight against the class scorn he identifies against the lower classes. He wants to politically join the red left of the social struggle and the green left of the environmentalists, a junction he qualifies as "a necessity". This junction is also associated in his thinking that the popular class ("more attached to the social question") and the petty bourgeoisie ("more attached to the ecological question") must be brought together. Maurice Kriegel-Valrimont is one of his political models. He defined himself as partial to the Left Front before "taking note of their suicide".

In June 2016, Ruffin participated in the launch of a campaign calling to no longer vote for the Socialist Party, including in the second round against the right or the far-right, and called for the emergence of a "populist movement of the left". During the 2017 French presidential election, he supported the candidacy of Jean-Luc Mélenchon without wishing to sign the charter of La France Insoumise, although he later joined their parliamentary group in the National Assembly. In May 2017, he published in Le Monde an open letter to Emmanuel Macron, whom he considers an "already hated future president". He voted for him in the second round of the presidential election, while indicating that he is "not proud" and promising to be a "firm opponent". In May 2023, Ruffin publicly called for signing a citizens' initiative petition on the National Assembly website, advocating for the establishment of the Citizens' Initiative Referendum in the Constitution, one of the flagship measures of the Yellow Vest movement.

=== Political engagements and actions as deputy ===
==== "Minimum wage deputy" ====
In 2017, Ruffin announced that he will be a "minimum wage deputy", who will donate part of his income to Charity word, then specifies that he receives from the Assembly on an account a little more than 7 000 euros gross of allowances, including 1,200 transferred to his personal account, which is the net minimum wage, the rest being used to pay his taxes, while the remaining 3,000 euros go to associations. The payment of a major part of the parliamentary allowance was an old tradition within the PCF (French communist party), which had supported Ruffin from the first round. His colleague from LFI Alexis Corbière, however, believes that his books and films bring him enough incomes.

==== Healthcare ====
Based on an investigation initiated by Florence Aubenas, published on 18 July 2017, in headline of Le Monde on a "100 day strike" by nursing assistants at the retirement home Les Opalines located in Foucherans, Ruffin challenged the Minister of Health on working conditions within the EHPAD, pointing out the silence of the government. He went there on 25 July 2017. Echoing the national mobilization of nursing home staff, he took out a check book during a speech at the French National Assembly on 31 January 2018 and invited Agnès Buzyn, the then Minister of Health, "to make a gesture".

== Debout ! ==
In 2017, Ruffin launched Picardie Debout! as a political movement to support his election to the French National Assembly. Ruffin won the constituency, and became the first elected official of the movement. The movement changed its name to Debout ! in June 2025.
