= Frédéric Lordon =

French economist (born 1962)

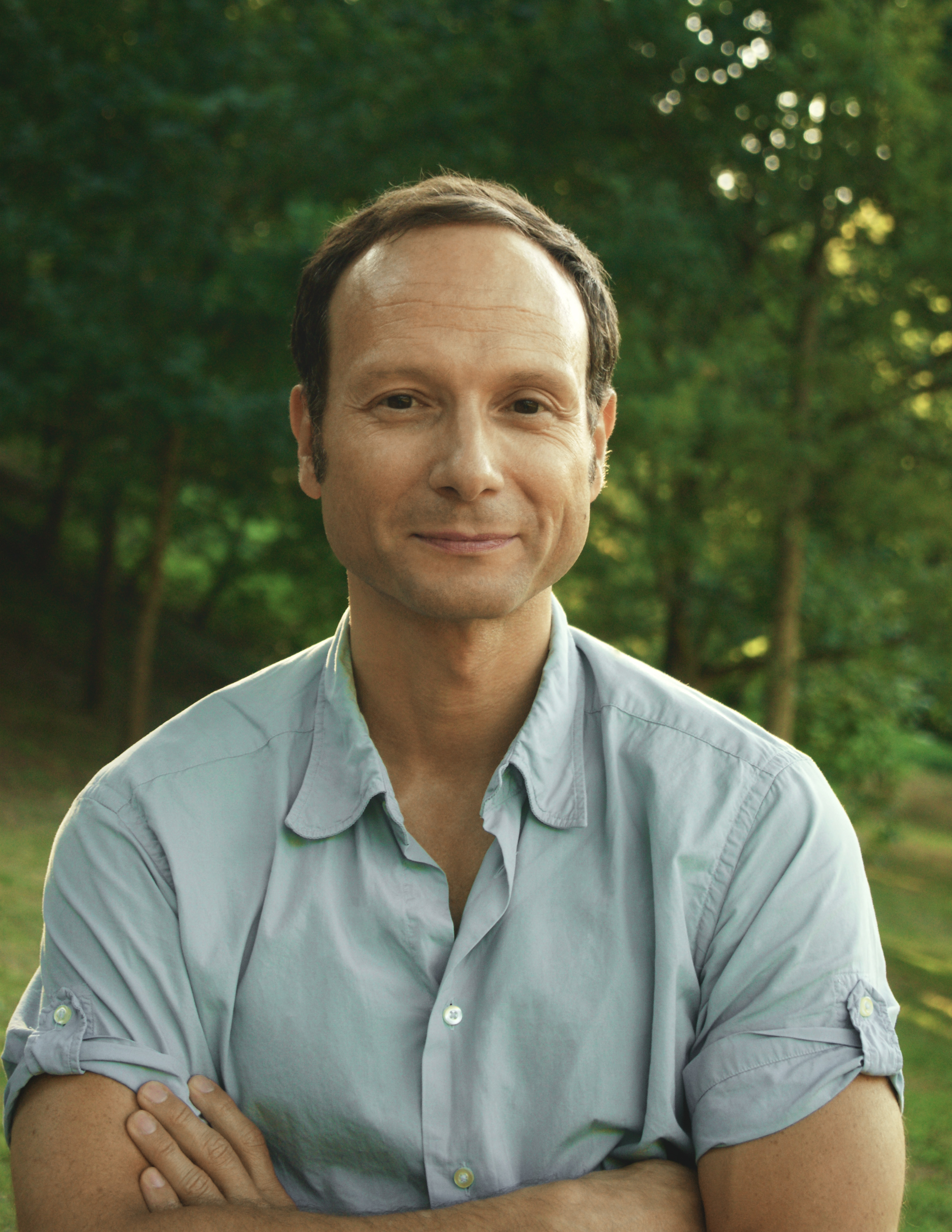
- Born: 15 January 1962 (age 64); France
- Movement: Nuit debout

Academic background
- Education: École nationale des ponts et chaussées HEC Paris
- Influences: Baruch Spinoza • Karl Marx • Émile Durkheim • Pierre Bourdieu

Academic work
- School or tradition: Marxism • Regulation school
- Institutions: EHESS, France

Frédéric Lordon (born 15 January 1962) is a French economist and philosopher, CNRS Director of Research at the Centre européen de sociologie et de science politique in Paris. He is an influential figure in France's Nuit debout movement and has regularly contributed to French broadcast and print media on French and European politics, and also writes a regular opinion column for Le Monde diplomatique. He has argued in favour of Communism as an alternative to Capitalism in books, articles and media appearances, and has been engaged in a project of re-grounding the social sciences in a Spinoza-inspired materialism. He is considered one of the most prominent intellectual voices of the radical left in France today.

== Education ==
Lordon studied at the École nationale des Ponts et Chaussées, beginning his studies in 1982 and receiving his degree there in 1985. He graduated with an MBA from the Institut Supérieur des Affaires in 1987. Supervised by Robert Boyer at the École des hautes études en sciences sociales, he completed his doctoral thesis in 1993, in which he "undertook a mathematical modelling of the Regulation School's theses on economic crisis. In the 90s, teaching at Sciences Po and then researching at the CNRS, he turned his attention to economic-policy formation."

== Career ==
Lordon teaches at the Ecole des Hautes Etudes en Sciences Sociales, in Paris.

He has served since 2004 as a director of research at the French National Centre for Scientific Research (CNRS). He is a member of "Economistes atterrés". ("Appalled Economists"), a group of economists formed in 2010 who reject the positions of mainstream economics, such as the efficient-market hypothesis, etc.

An early observer of the subprime mortgage crisis, he proposed the implementation of a tax he nicknamed SLAM, for Shareholder Limited Authorized Margin, the effect of which would be to limit profits so that profit making ventures in the real economy are not determined "only by the interests of the stock exchange market."

Lordon played an instrumental role in the rise of the Nuit debout movement. He wrote a piece in the February 2016 issue of Le Monde diplomatique on François Ruffin's film, Merci patron!, describing the film as a clarion call for a potential uprising. This prompted Ruffin to organise a public meeting which led to the organisation of the public occupation of Paris's Place de la République on 31 March 2016. Lordon spoke at the 31 March protest, highlighting the goals of disparate protest movements. He never talked to national media about his role in the movement, explaining that he did not wish to be seen as the leader of a leaderless movement.

== Work ==
While Lordon was considered in his early career to be indebted to, and involved with, the French 'regulation school' (a school of economic thought which developed in France in the 1970s and which was indebted to systems theory, the Annales school among others), more recently he has moved towards a much more radically Communist position, and has argued in a number of books and articles for the necessity of naming Communism as a concrete political vision for a post-capitalist society. Lordon has written in favour of what he calls 'Neo-Leninism', which he defines as "1) an objective, that is 2) macroscopic, and 3) an explicit imperative of strategic co-ordination in an adequate form. I hardly need to emphasise the enormity of the problems that this ‘adequate form’ contain. The important point here is that one imperative leads to another. The imperative of strategic co-ordination leads to the imperative of thinking about its proper form."

Lordon's work is an attempt to integrate Spinoza's concepts, such as conatus, into the study of political economy, and Spinoza's influence is clear across Lordon's works. In Vivre sans?, Lordon uses Spinoza's philosophy in order to critique certain currents of contemporary radical left thought, especially The Invisible Committee and Giorgio Agamben, as well as Gilles Deleuze, Jacques Rancière, and Alain Badiou. In Vivre sans? (2019), "A conception of political action and power drawn from Spinoza is accordingly juxtaposed to a constellation of the antipolitical that evades the urgent challenges of modern political collectivity and conflict via intransitivity (Deleuze's becomings without a future), aesthetics (Rancière's rare political moments) or virtuosity (Badiou's political subject as exceptional sage)." Lordon argues that instead the left should grapple with the question of its relation to institutions, the possibility of revolutionary politics, and provide a positive vision for a communist society.

In Capitalisme, désir et servitude (English: Willing Slaves of Capital), Lordon proposes to rethink the question of labour by combining "a Marxist understanding of wage labour with a Spinozian anthropology of the passions", where "Marx supplies the fundamental framework: capitalism begins with ‘bare life, in need of reproduction’, its precondition the full dependence of labour on the market after the enclosures of the commons. The ‘basal desire’ for money as a means to survive allows the capitalist employer to ‘capture’ the workers’ desires for his own ends. The deteriorating balance of forces between the two has allowed neoliberal capital to indulge in the delirium of unlimited capture, as in employers’ proposals to lower unemployment by deregulating redundancies—the meta-desire to benefit from institutional conditions for the unrestricted pursuit of desire."

He is also a critic of the European Union. Following the Brexit referendum in 2016, Lordon wrote that "Whereas when the pro-EU commentariat exclaim that ‘the UK has been cut off’ after Brexit, they are deadly serious. We should take the poverty of this kind of argument as a solid indicator of the political and rhetorical extremes the ‘defend Europe’ camp has reached, now it has nothing else left – or only this and the spectre of ‘war’ – to try and hold back a wave now at the point of sweeping everything away. Unable to convince populations with evidence of its good deeds, neoliberalism – its European branch in the lead – has no other resource than to oscillate between the imaginary of the turnip and the camp (ramparts, watchtowers, barbed wire) in order to get them to put up with it." He was also critical of the European Union's treatment of Greece's Syriza government in following their 2015 bailout referendum, claiming that "Since the first day of the Syriza government, the European institutions have had no project other than to make sure that it bites the dust, with an exemplary punishment that will make it into a lesson to think about for any other government that might get the idea of not just capitulating; as if it were necessary to erase any trace of the first authentic change of power in Europe for decades."

== Books ==
(in French)

- Les Quadratures de la politique économique ("The quadratures of political economy"), Paris, Albin Michel, 1997
- Fonds de pension, piège à cons. Mirage de la démocratie actionnariale ("Pension funds, a trap for fools. Mirage of shareholder democracy"), Paris, Liber/Raisons d'agir, 2000
- La Politique du capital ("The capitalist policy"), Paris, Odile Jacob, 2002
- Et la vertu sauvera le monde ("And virtue will save the world"), Paris, Liber/Raisons d'agir, 2003
- L'intérêt souverain — Essai d'anthropologie économique spinoziste ("The sovereign interest — Essay of spinozean anthropology"), Paris, La Découverte, 2006
- Spinoza et les sciences sociales. De l'économie des affects à la puissance de la multitude ("Spinoza and the social sciences. From the sentimental economy to the power of the multitudes"), In collaboration with Yves Citton. Paris, Éditions Amsterdam, 2008
- Jusqu'à quand ? Pour en finir avec les crises financières ("Until when? To put an end to financial crises"), Paris, Éditions Raisons d’agir, 2008
- Conflits et pouvoirs dans les institutions du capitalisme ("Conflicts and powers in the capitalist institutions"), Presses de la Fondation des Sciences Politiques, Paris, 2008
- La crise de trop – Reconstruction d'un monde failli ("The crisis of too much _ Reconstruction of a failed world"), Paris, Éditions Fayard, 2009
- Capitalisme, désir et servitude. Marx et Spinoza ("Capitalism, desire and servitude. Marx and Spinoza"), La Fabrique éditions, 2010
  - In English: Willing Slaves of Capital, translated by Gabriel Ash. (London & New York: Verso Books, 2014), ISBN 9781781681602
- D'un retournement l'autre. Comédie sérieuse sur la crise financière (""From one turn to another. Serious comedy on the financial crisis), Paris, Seuil, 2011
- L'intérêt souverain – Essai d'anthropologie économique ("The sovereign interest — Essay of economic anthropology"), Paris, La Découverte, 2011
- Imperium - Structures et affects des corps politique ("Imperium - Structures and affects of political bodies"), Paris, La Fabrique, 2015
  - In English: Imperium: Structures and Affects of Political Bodies, translated by Andy Bliss, foreword by Alberto Toscano. (London & New York: Verso Books, 2022) ISBN 1786636425
- Les affects de la politique ("The Affects of politics"), Paris, Éditions du Seuil, 2016
- La condition anarchique ("The anarchic condition"), Paris, Seuil, 2018
- Vivre sans ? : Institutions, police, travail, argent...("Living Without? : Institutions, police, work, money..."), Paris, La Fabrique, 2019
- Figures du communisme ("Figures of Communism"), Paris, La Fabrique, 2021
