= Alberto Martinelli =

Italian weiter and sociolgist

Alberto martinelli
- Born: 26 April 1940 (age 85); Milan, Italy
- Occupations: Writer and socilogist

Alberto Martinelli (26 April 1945) is a scholar of social sciences, President of the International Social Science Council, former 14th president of the International Sociological Association (1998-2002) and professor of Political Science and Sociology at the University of Milan.

== Career ==
After receiving his Bachelor of Arts B.A. in economics from Bocconi University of Milan and his PhD in sociology from the University of California, Berkeley, Martinelli started teaching at the University of Milan (Università degli Studi di Milano), where he became full professor of Economic Sociology in 1980 and of Political Science in 1987. Between 1987 and 1999, he was Dean of the Faculty of Political and Social Sciences of the University of Milan. He also taught sociology at Bocconi University of Milan and Political Science and Sociology in various foreign universities, among which the University of California, Berkeley, Stanford University Fall quarter 1978, New York University, and the Saint Petersburg State University Summer School in Sociology. In 1998–2002, he was elected President of the International Sociological Association. He is President of the International Social Science Council. He is President of the AEM Foundation-A2A Group. He has chaired the Evaluation Committee of the University of Padua, 2010-2016. He is member of the Istituto Lombardo Accademia di Scienze e Lettere. He is a member of the Real Academia des Ciencias Morales y Politicas de Espana.

== Research ==
Martinelli has coordinated and participated in major international research projects, like ‘Business Interests Associations’, ‘Comparative Charting of Social Change’, ‘Sustainability for the 21.st Century: Overcoming Limits to Creative Adaptation’, 'Knowledge for Integration Governance' (KING).

He is member of the Scientific Committee of Expo Milano 2015 . He is member of the Scientific Committee of ISMU-Eupolis (Regional Institute of Research of Lombardy). He has been member of Italy's National Council of Science and Technology for its whole duration. Between 2001 and 2006, he has been elected in the City Council of Milan. He is on the editorial board of several scientific journals and writes for newspapers and magazines, including Il Corriere della Sera. In 40 years of scholarly work, he has written books and essays on political and sociological theory, modernization and development studies, international relations and global politics, entrepreneurship and management, corporate social responsibility, complex organizations, interest groups and policy-making. His recent interests focus on sustainable development, European politics and society, comparative political and social systems, models and actors of global governance.

== Books ==
- European Society, Brill, 2020.
- Transatlantic Divide.Comparing American and European Society, Oxford University Press, 2008 (Review of Transatlantic Divide in International Sociology, ISSN 0268-5809, vol.24, n.5, Sept. 2009:695-699).
- L’Occidente allo specchio. Modelli di società a confronto, Università Bocconi Editore, 2008.
- Global Modernization.Rethinking the Project of Modernity, Sage, 2005 (Russian edition, 2006, Chinese edition forthcoming).
- La modernizzazione, Laterza, 1998, 11th edition 2009.
- La democrazia globale, Università Bocconi Editore, 2004, New Edition 2008.
- La società italiana, (with A. Chiesi), Laterza, 2002 (Spanish edition Editorial Sistema, 2005).
- Progetto ’89. Tre saggi su libertà, eguaglianza e fraternità, Il Saggiatiore, 1989, New Edition 2009.
- Recent Social Trends in Italy, 1960-1995 McGill-Queens’University Press, 1999.
- L’azione collettiva degli imprenditori italiani, Comunità, 1994.
- International Markets and Global Firms, Sage, London, 1991.
- Economy and Society (a cura di A. Martinelli e N.J.Smelser), Sage, 1990.
- The New International Economy (with H. Makler e N. J. Smelser), Sage, 1982.
- I grandi imprenditori italiani (con A. Chiesi e N. Dalla Chiesa), Feltrinelli, Milano, 1981
- Università e società negli Stati Uniti, Einaudi, Torino, 1978.
- La teoria dell'imperialismo, Loescher, Torino, 1974.
- Section Editor for Organization and Management Studies of the New International Encyclopedia of the Social and Behavioural Sciences (Elsevier, 2002).

== Essays ==
- “Sustainable governance and socially responsible corporations”, Politeia, XXV, 3, 2009:273-289.
- “Sociology in political practice and public discourse”, Current Sociology, 56, 3, May 2008:361-370.
- “The two unions: the political systems of the US and the EU”, Quaderni di Scienza politica, VI, 2e3, 2006:213-273.
- “The European Identity” in E Ben Rafael and Y Sternberg eds. Comparing Modernities, Pluralism versus Homogeneity. Essays in Homage to Shmuel N. Eisenstadt, Brill, 2005.
- "From world system to world society?" in Journal of World-Systems Research, XI, 2, Nov. 2005
- "Rational Choice and Sociology" in J. Alexander, G. Marx, C. Williams eds., Self, Social Structure and Beliefs: Explorations in the Sociological Thought of Neil J. Smelser, University of California Press, 2004.
- "Markets, Governments, Communities and Global Governance", International Sociology, vol.18, n.2, June 2003, pp. 291–324 (revised edition of the Presidential Speech ISA World Congress of Sociology, Brisbane 2002).
