= Ulf Himmelstrand =

Swedish sociologist (1924–2011)

Ulf Himmelstrand (26 August 1924 – 8 June 2011) was a Swedish sociologist specializing in African studies. He has been called the "father of sociology in Nigeria". He was the ninth president of the International Sociological Association (1978–1982).

== Biography ==
Himmelstrand was born on 26 August 1924 in Turipattur, India, where his father served as a missionary for the Church of Sweden.

He was a lecturer at the University of Uppsala, and an assistant professor there from 1960 to 1964. Later he co-created and headed the first Department of Sociology at the University of Ibadan, Nigeria. He left Nigeria in 1967 following the disturbances of the Nigerian Civil War which began that year, returning to the University of Uppsala where he would teach and research at the Department of Sociology from 1969 until his retirement in 1989. From 1987 to 1991 he was also a visiting professor at the Nairobi University in Kenya.

He was the ninth president of the International Sociological Association (ISA), serving in that capacity from 1978 to 1982.

In 2000 he published an autobiography in Swedish, Ögonblicket, but as of 2019 it has not been translated into English.

He died in Uppsala on 8 June 2011.

== Impact and research ==
Called the "father of sociology in Nigeria", he is credited with "decolonizing" the sociology courses, establishing the first Department of Sociology, and starting the first large-scale social science research project in Nigeria.

In his research interests, he has been called "an Africanist and a theorist, a positivist and to some extent a Marxist, concerned with social psychology and opinion studies as well as macro-economic factors". Another overview stated that "attitudes were at the centre of his research work". Himmelstrand himself described his focus as "social-psychological studies in the emotive and cognitive aspects of opinions and attitudes published in my doctoral thesis ... research in political sociology and mass-communication, sociology of development (Africa in particular), and economic sociology."

== Works ==
- Social Pressures, Attitudes and Democratic Processes (1960); Almqvist & Wiksell
- Beyond Welfare Capitalism: Issues, Actors, and Forces in Societal Change (1981); Heinemann Educational Books ISBN 9780435824051
- Sociology, from Crisis to Science?: The sociology of structure and action (1986); Sage Publications ISBN 9780803980235
- Interfaces in Economic and Social Analysis (1992); Routledge ISBN 9780415068727
