= International Social Science Council =

- Abbreviation: ISSC
- Merged into: International Council for Science
- Successor: International Science Council
- Formation: 1952; 74 years ago
- Dissolved: July 2018; 8 years ago
- Type: INGO
- Location: Paris, France
- Region served: Worldwide
- Official language: English
- President: Alberto Martinelli
- Website: worldsocialscience.org

The International Social Science Council (ISSC) was an international non-governmental organization promoting the social sciences, including the economic and behavioural sciences. Founded in 1952, the organization was based out of UNESCO headquarters in Paris, France.

== History ==
The ISSC was established in October 1952 under the auspices of UNESCO following a resolution adopted at the 6th UNESCO General Conference in 1951.

It was adopted on 19 September 1972, completed and revised on 14 November 1979, and underwent multiple revisions on 17 December 1985, 3 December 1992, 27 November 1998, 8 November 2006, and finally 10 December 2010. ISSC was registered in accordance with French Law.

In July 2018, the ISSC merged with the International Council for Science (ICSU) to form the International Science Council (ISC).

== Mission ==
The mission of the ISSC was to advance the social sciences – their quality, novelty, and utility – in all parts of the world:

- To advance social science research across national and regional boundaries;
- To support social science capacity building, particularly in countries and regions where it is currently not well developed;
- To provide a central clearinghouse for the collection, interpretation, analysis, and dissemination of data on social science resources, their availability for research and their impact on society; * To broaden interdisciplinary collaboration among the social sciences;
- To expand exchange and joint work between the social sciences, the humanities, and other sciences; * To link social science knowledge effectively to public policies and local needs to improve the quality of people's lives;
- To promote the social science literacy of citizens.

The activities of the council were guided by the principles of academic freedom, the pursuit of excellence, equitable access to scientific information and data, unfettered conduct of science, open communication and transparency, accountability, and the use of knowledge for societal value. Besides, the Council sought to support the participation of women, minorities, and other under-represented groups in social science research.

== Governance and structure ==
The ISSC was governed by a General Assembly, comprising the council's membership. The General Assembly met every three years to review the council's activities and determine the general direction of its future work.

The ISSC Executive Committee was elected by the General Assembly and acted as the council's governing body. It consisted of the President, two Vice-Presidents and a Treasurer, as well as ten further members (Ordinary Members).

The General Assembly, on the recommendation of the Executive Committee, approved the appointment of the Executive Director, who headed the council's Secretariat, and served as an ex-officio member of the Executive Committee and all appointed (standing or ad hoc) committees of the ISSC.

The council was advised and guided by individuals from around the world who volunteered their time to serve on various ISSC Committees and Working Groups.

== Activities ==
The ISSC led a number of flagship activities and was a partner on many collaborative initiatives.

=== World Social Science Report ===
The ISSC produced the World Social Science Report every three years, as part of its strategic partnership with UNESCO. The reports aim to address important social science challenges, take stock of social science contributions and capacities, and make recommendations for future research, practice, and policy.

- The World Social Science Report 2010: Knowledge Divides was prepared by the ISSC and published by UNESCO in June 2010. It reviewed social science knowledge production and use in different regions of the world and assessed how the social sciences are evolving in the face of unequal conditions and diverging trends.
- The World Social Science Report 2013: Changing Global Environments was prepared by the ISSC and co-published with UNESCO and the OECD. It was launched at UNESCO in Paris in November 2013.
- The World Social Science Report 2016: Challenging Inequalities – Pathways to a Just World was prepared by the ISSC in collaboration with the Institute of Development Studies (IDS), and co-published with UNESCO. It was launched in Stockholm on September 22, 2016.

=== World Social Science Forum ===
The ISSC convened the World Social Science Forum. These events gathered researchers, funders, policymakers, and other stakeholders to debate topics of global significance and to determine future priorities for international social science.

- The ISSC convened the first-ever World Social Science Forum in Bergen, Norway, 10–12 May 2009; on the topic 'One planet - worlds apart?'
- The second World Social Science Forum, 'Social Transformations and the Digital Age,' took place in Montreal, Canada, in October 2013.
- The third World Social Science Forum, 'Transforming Global Relations for a Just World,' took place in Durban, South Africa, 13–16 September 2015.
- The fourth World Social Science Forum, 'Security and Equality for Sustainable Futures,' took place in Fukuoka, Japan, in September 2018.

=== Transformations to Sustainability ===
Transformations to Sustainability (T2S) is a research program supporting social-science-led research on social transformations to greater sustainability. The program is funded by the Swedish International Development Cooperation Agency (Sida) and has supported 38 seed projects (September 2014 to March 2015) and three Transformative Knowledge Networks (December 2015 to December 2018). The program aims to build on the networks of knowledge gathered through the seed projects and Transformative Knowledge Networks to create and leave behind a lasting global knowledge base.

The Transformations to Sustainability program contributes to Future Earth.

=== Programmes and networks ===
The ISSC initiated and supported several international research programmes to foster comparative, interdisciplinary research by setting up networks of social scientists from different disciplines and regions of the world. The ISSC co-sponsored several international research programmes and networks around various themes, such as the environment, disaster risk, poverty, and gender. These initiatives were undertaken in partnership with various partners and other organisations around the world.

- Comparative Research Programme on Poverty
- Future Earth
- International Human Dimensions Programme
- Integrated Research on Disaster Risk
- Gender, Globalisation, and Democratisation Network

=== Prizes ===
The ISSC was awarded two prestigious international prizes: the Stein Rokkan Prize for Comparative Social Science Research and the Foundation Mattei Dogan Prize for Excellence in Interdisciplinary Research.

Nominations for the prize were made by ISSC members or other professional associations in various disciplines, as well as by universities and academic institutions. The selection of a winner is made by an international jury of scholars.

=== World Social Science Fellows ===
From 2012 to 2015, the ISSC led the World Social Science Fellows programme, an international scientific programme to support early-career researchers in the social sciences. ISSC aimed to foster a new generation of globally networked research leaders who will collaborate in addressing global problems with particular relevance for low and middle-income countries.

== Member organizations ==
- Academy of the Social Sciences in Australia
- Arab Council for the Social Sciences
- Associação Nacional de Pós-Graduação e Pesquisa em Ciências Sociais (ANPOCS)
- Association of Asian Social Science Research Councils (AASSREC)
- British Academy
- Chinese Academy of Social Sciences (CASS)
- Latinoamericano de Ciencias Sociales (CLACSO)
- Council for the Development of Social Science Research in Africa (CODESRIA)
- Czech Academy of Sciences (CAS)
- Deutsche Forschungsgemeinschaft (DFG)
- Economic and Social Research Council (ESRC)
- European Association of Development Research and Training Institutes (EADI)
- European Consortium for Political Research (ECPR)
- Human Sciences Research Council of South Africa (HSRC)
- Indian Council of Social Science Research (ICSSR)
- International Arctic Social Sciences Association (IASSA)
- International Association of Applied Psychology (IAAP)
- International Association of Legal Science (IALS)
- International Economic Association (IEA)
- International Federation of Data Organisations (IFDO)
- International Geographical Union (IGU)
- International Peace Research Association (IPRA)
- International Society for Ecological Economics (ISEE)
- International Sociological Association (ISA)
- International Studies Association (ISA)
- International Union of Academies (UAI)
- International Union for the Scientific Study of Population (IUSSP)
- International Union of Psychological Science (IUPSYS)
- Korean Social Science Research Council (KOSSREC)
- National Academy of Sciences, Republic of Korea (NAS)
- National Research Foundation
- Netherlands Organisation for Scientific Research (NWO)
- Organization for Social Science Research in Eastern and Southern Africa (OSSREA)
- Philippine Social Science Council (PSSC)
- Research Council of Norway (RCN)
- The Research Council Oman
- Royal Netherlands Academy of Arts and Sciences (KNAW)
- The Royal Society of New Zealand (RSNZ)
- Science Council of Asia (SCA)
- Science Council of Japan
- Slovak Academy of Sciences (SAS)
- Social Science and Humanities Research Council of Canada (SSHRC)
- Social Science Research Council (SSRC)
- Society for Social Studies of Science (4S)
- Swiss Academy of Humanities and Social Sciences (SAHS)
- Transnational Institute (TNI)
- Turkish Academy of Science (TUBA)
- World Anthropological Union (WAU)
- World Association for Public Opinion Research (WAPOR)
- The University of Bergen (UIB)
