= Merci patron! =

French documentary film directed by François Ruffin

- Film poster
- Directed by: François Ruffin
- Produced by: Edouard Mauriat; Johanna Silva
- Edited by: Cécile Dubois
- Production companies: Mille et Unes production Les Quatre cents clous
- Distributed by: Jour2fête
- Release date: 24 February 2016 (France)
- Running time: 83 minutes
- Country: France
- Language: French
- Budget: €150,000
- Box office: $3.8 million

Merci patron! (Thank you, boss!) is a French documentary film directed by journalist François Ruffin. It was first screened in 2015 and was released nationally in France on 24 February 2016. The film is critical of the practice of outsourcing French jobs to foreign labour, and in particular it is critical of one of France's richest people, Bernard Arnault, chairman and CEO of the luxury goods conglomerate LVMH. The style of the documentary has been compared to that of the American director Michael Moore. The film's success has been cited as a factor in the rise of the Nuit debout movement.

== Synopsis ==
The film's stars are Jocelyn and Serge Klur, former workers at a factory that manufactured clothes for the luxury goods brand Kenzo, owned by LVMH. When the factory was moved to Poland, the couple found themselves unemployed, struggling with debt, and at risk of losing their house.

The director and left-wing activist François Ruffin sets out to help the couple, seeking to make Bernard Arnault, head of LVMH, pay compensation to the couple for "ruining their lives".

== Release ==
The film was a box office success. By the end of April 2016, the film had been seen by 315,183 cinemagoers in France.

Bernard Arnault, when asked about the film by a shareholder at a meeting on 7 April 2016, responded, "LVMH is the illustration, the incarnation of the worst, according to these extreme leftist observers, of what the market economy produces."

== Awards ==
The film won the César for best documentary in 2017, the same year Ruffin was elected to the lower house of the French parliament.
