= Fred Moore (politician) =

French soldier, politician, and optician

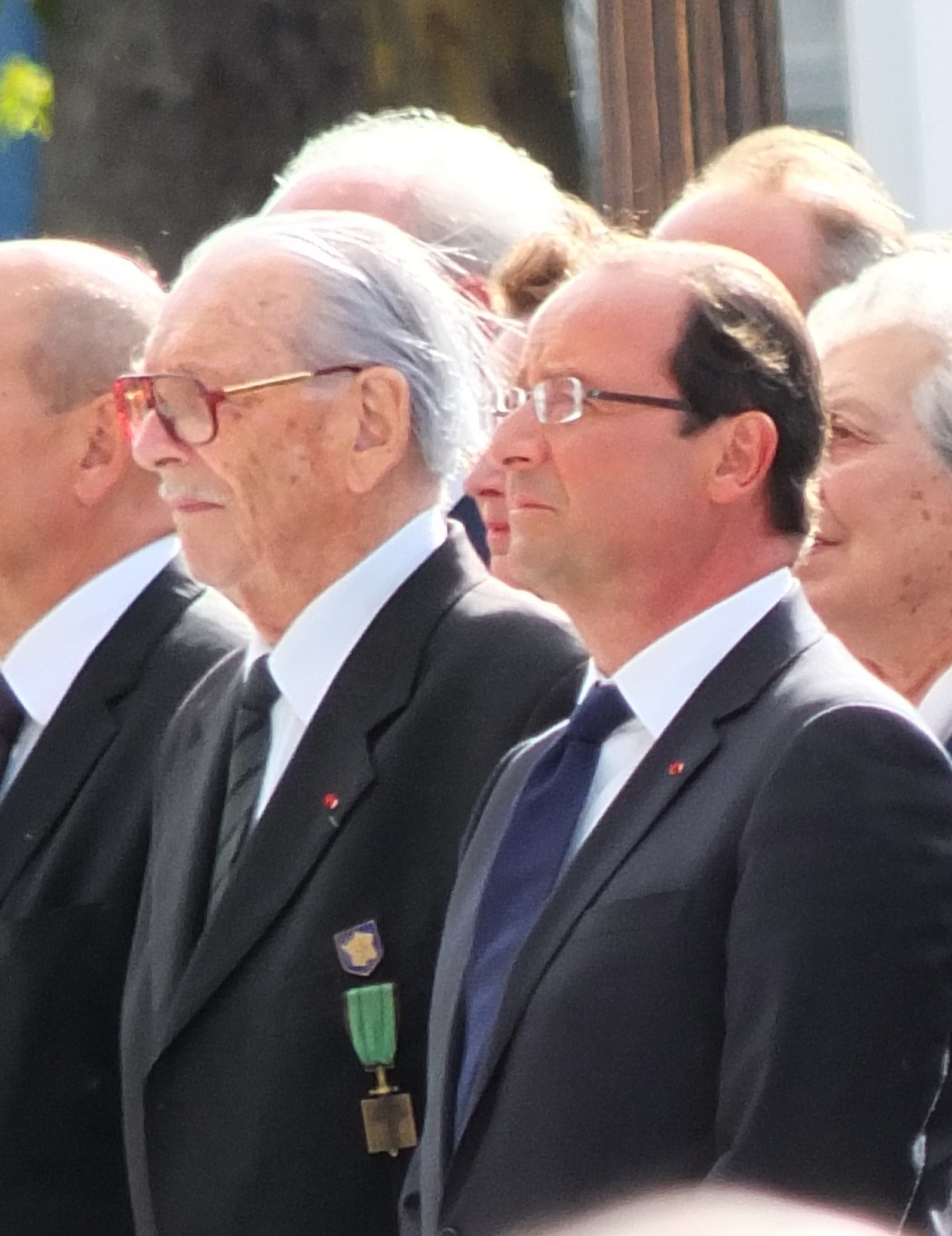
Fred Moore (left) next to François Hollande (right) in 2012.

Fred Moore (2 August 1920 – 16 September 2017) was a French soldier, politician, and optician.

A native of Brest, Moore was born on 2 August 1920. He fought from July 1940 to April 1945 for Free France during World War II. Demobilized a year later, Moore became an optician in Amiens. He was reconscripted for the Algerian War between May and November 1956. Moore won election to the National Assembly in 1958 and represented Somme for the Gaullist Union for the New Republic until 1962. He held other political offices until 1969, when he resigned to return to work as an optician. Moore died on 16 September 2017, aged 97, at the veterans' hospital in Les Invalides.
