= Geoffrey Pleyers =

Belgian sociologist (born 1978)

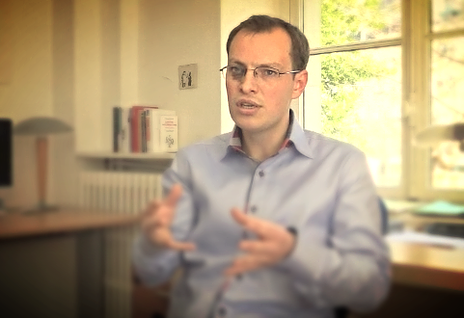
Geoffrey Pleyers

Geoffrey Pleyers is an F.R.S.–FNRS Research Director and Professor of sociology at Université Catholique de Louvain, Belgium. He holds a BA in sociology from the University of Liege (2000), a master's degree (2001) and a doctorate from the Ecole des Hautes Etudes en Sciences Sociales in Paris (2006).

In 2023, he was elected the 21st President of the International Sociological Association (ISA).

His research interests include global sociology, globalization, social movements, youth, food movements, Latin America and religion. He is the author of "Alter-Globalization. Becoming Actors in the Global Age".

== Awards and honors ==
In 2026, he was awarded a Doctorate Honoris Causa by the Universidad Nacional Pedro Ruiz Gallo and the College of Sociologists of Peru for his work on social movements and Latin America.

== Professional associations ==
From 2014 to 2018, he chaired the Research Committee 47 "Social classes and social movements" of the International Sociological Association. During this period, he organised conferences on social movements in different countries, including Mexico, Romania, Hong Kong, France, Belgium and Palestine.

In July 2018, he was elected vice-president for Research of the International Sociological Association, for a five-year term during which he presided the ISA World Forum of Sociology, held online due to the COVID-19 pandemic, in February 2021.

In June 2023, he was elected president of the International Sociological Association, for a four-year term. At the opening session of the 2025 ISA World Forum of Sociology, he presented the ISA Declaration "A time for Sociology" that calls for a rigorous, independent, critical, general, public and global sociology.

== A global sociologist ==
Along his career, Geoffrey Pleyers has held visiting appointments at the London School Economics, New York University, Graduate Centre City University of New York, Universidad Nacional Autónoma de México, Universidad de Chile, Universidad Alberto Hurtado, Academia de Humanismo Cristiano, FLACSO Ecuador.

From 2015 to 2021, Geoffrey Pleyers and Breno Bringel edited the article series "Open Movements: for a global and public sociology of social movements". This joint project by the Research Committee 47 from the ISA and the website Open Democracy aims at providing critical and empirically based outlooks on social movements and new expressions of social and cultural transformations, the ones which make the media headlines and those which discreetly transform daily life and politics alike, at the local and global scales.

== Research interests ==
His research interests include global sociology, globalization, social movements, youth, food movements, Latin America and religion.

In his main book "Alter-Globalization. Becoming Actors in the Global Age" (Cambridge, Polity, 2010), he analyses the global justice movement as a convergence of two cultures of activism in its quest for social change. One focuses on a bottom-up approach, implementing changes at the local scale and giving a prominent place to experience, subjectivity, experimentation and the local scale. The second one, the "way of reason", is based on citizen's expertise and institutional regulation.

== Selected publications ==
=== Books ===
- El cambio nunca es lineal. Movimientos sociales en tiempos polarizados. Buenos Aires: Clacso, 2024, ISBN 978-987-813-823-7
- Alter-Globalization. Becoming Actors in the Global Age. Cambridge:Polity Press, 2011 ISBN 978-0-745-64676-3
- Movimientos sociales en el siglo XXI. Buenos Aires: CLACSO, 2018 ISBN 978-987-722-373-6
- Forums Sociaux Mondiaux et Défis de l'Altermondialisme. Brussels: Academia, 2007, ISBN 978-2-87209-887-3

=== Edited books ===
- Chile en movimientos, with Karla Henríquez, Buenos Aires: CLACSO, 2023. ISBN 978-987-813-562-5
- Social Movements and Politics during COVID-19, with Breno Bringel, Bristol: Bristol University Press, 2022. ISBN 978-1529217254
- Alerta Global. Políticas y movimientos en tiempos de pandemia , with Breno Bringel, Buenos Aires: CLACSO, 2020. ISBN 978-987-722-646-1
- Protestas e indignación global. Los movimientos sociales en el nuevo orden mundial, with Breno Bringel, Buenos Aires: CLACSO, 2018. ISBN 978-987-722-234-0
- México en movimientos. Resistencias y alternativas, with Manuel Garza, México: Porrúa, 2018. ISBN 978-607-524-156-2
- Economie solidaire et mouvements sociaux, with JL Laville, E. Bucolo, Corragio, Paris: Desclée de Brouwer, 2017. ISBN 978-2-2200-9213-3
- Subjectivation et désubjectivation , with M. Boucher, Paris: Editions MSH, 2017. ISBN 978-2-7351-2350-6
- Mouvements sociaux. Quand le sujet devient acteur, with B. Capitaine, Paris: Editions MSH, 2016. ISBN 978-2-7351-2100-7
- Social movements in Central and Eastern Europe, with I. Sava, Bucharest, Press of the University of Bucharest, 2015.
- La consommation critique Paris, Desclee de Brouwer, 2011. ISBN 978-2-22006-147-4
- Movimientos sociales. De lo local a lo global. Co-edited with Sergio Zermeño & Francis Mestries. Barcelona: Anthropos & Mexico City: UAM. ISBN 978-8-47658-936-6

=== Articles ===
- What can Sociology do in Wartime? The resilience of Ukrainian Sociologists, International Sociology, vol. 41.
- Global Sociology: Four Transformations. First Address as President of the ISA, Global Dialogue, vol. 13.3., 2023.
- For a Global Sociology of Social Movements, Globalizations, 2023.
- The Pandemic is a Battlefield. Social movements during the COVID-19 lockdown, Journal of Civil Society, 2020.
- Ecology and the global age. A social movement perspective, in: Bringel & Dominguez eds., Global Modernity and Social Protests, London: Sage
