= International Sociology =

- Discipline: Sociology
- Language: English
- Edited by: Marta Soler Gallart

Publication details
- History: 1986–present
- Publisher: SAGE Publications
- Frequency: Bimonthly
- Impact factor: 0.741 (2016)

Standard abbreviations
- ISO 4: Int. Sociol.

Indexing
- ISSN: 0268-5809 (print); 1461-7242 (web)
- LCCN: 88659310
- OCLC no.: 41551866

Links
- Journal homepage; Online access; Online archive

International Sociology is a peer-reviewed academic journal covering the field of sociology. The editor-in-chief is Marta Soler Gallart (Universitat de Barcelona). It was established in 1986 and is published by SAGE Publications on behalf of the International Sociological Association. The journal publishes both theoretical and empirical papers using qualitative and quantitative approaches.

== Abstracting and indexing ==
The journal is abstracted and indexed in:

- Academic Search Premier
- Current Contents/Social & Behavioral Sciences
- FRANCIS
- International Bibliography of Periodical Literature
- International Bibliography of the Social Sciences
- International Political Science Abstracts
- PsycINFO
- Scopus
- Social Sciences Citation Index
- Sociological Abstracts
- Worldwide Political Science Abstracts

According to the Journal Citation Reports, the journal has a 2016 impact factor of 0.741.
