= Current Sociology =

- Discipline: Sociology
- Language: English
- Edited by: Karim Murji and Sarah Neal

Publication details
- History: 1952–present
- Publisher: SAGE Publications
- Frequency: Bimonthly
- Impact factor: 1.9 (2023)

Standard abbreviations
- ISO 4: Curr. Sociol.

Indexing
- ISSN: 0011-3921 (print); 1461-7064 (web)
- LCCN: 55057288
- OCLC no.: 1565681

Links
- Journal homepage; Online access; Online archive

Current Sociology is a bimonthly peer-reviewed academic journal covering the field of sociology. Established in 1952, it is an official journal of the International Sociological Association and published on their behalf by SAGE Publications.

== Abstracting and indexing ==
The journal is abstracted and indexed in Scopus and the Social Sciences Citation Index. According to the Journal Citation Reports, its 2023 impact factor is 1.9, ranking it 78 out of 217 in the category "Sociology".
