= International Sociological Association =

Scholarly and professional society for sociologists

- Formation: 1949; 77 years ago
- Headquarters: Madrid, Spain
- Members: 6008 (as of 2024)
- President: Geoffrey Pleyers
- Website: www.isa-sociology.org

The International Sociological Association (ISA) is a non-profit organization dedicated to scientific purposes in the field of sociology and social sciences. It is an international sociological body, gathering both individuals and national sociological organizations. The ISA was founded in 1949 under UNESCO and it has about 6,000 individual and 45 collective members, hailing from 167 countries. Its sole purpose is to "represent sociologists everywhere, regardless of their school of thought, scientific approaches or ideological opinion" and its objective is to "advance sociological knowledge throughout the world". Along with the Institut International de Sociologie (IIS), it is seen as a world-leading international sociological organization.

ISA is a member of the International Social Science Council with the status of the non-governmental organization in formal associate relations with UNESCO and special consultative status with the Economic and Social Council of the United Nations.

The ISA's international conference is held every four years, the last of which, the XX ISA World Congress of Sociology in Melbourne, Australia in 2023. The ISA also organizes international forums every four years, a number of smaller conferences, and publishes two peer-reviewed academic journals: Current Sociology and International Sociology, as well as Global Dialogue Magazine, published in 15 languages.

ISA's first president (1949–1952) was Louis Wirth. The current president (2023–2027) is Geoffrey Pleyers, Belgium.

== Origins ==
Earlier logo of ISA was similar, but used transparent font.

The history of ISA can be traced to the 1948 initiative of UNESCO's Social Science Department. The initiative was part of a larger plan aiming together to reform the social sciences worldwide, by improving the ties between scholars worldwide "to promote research in fields crucial to establishments of a peaceful world order". As of 1949, sociological associations existed only in Belgium, Brazil, China, Germany, Italy, Japan, the Netherlands, and the United States, with about twenty four more countries having sociologist represented in a different type of an institution. The Institut International de Sociologie (IIS), founded in 1893, was deemed too limited, and it was decided that a new organization needs to be created. In the end, representatives from 21 countries were invited for a Constituent Congress, held in Oslo on 5–11 September 1949. The original stated purpose of the organization was "to advance sociological knowledge throughout the world" through measures including developing "personal contacts between sociologists" in different regions and encouraging "international dissemination and exchange of information". A provisional Council was appointed, as were an Executive Secretary, Treasurer, and the Secretariat personnel; statutes were adopted. SA's first president was Louis Wirth. The first ISA conference was planned for 1950.

== Activities ==
In 1952 ISA begun publishing an academic journal, Current Sociology. 1971 marked the introduction of the official newsletter, the ISA Bulletin. In 1986 ISA launched International Sociology, a peer-reviewed journal published six times annually and provided to all members. International Sociology also has a child publication, a bi-annual International Sociology Review of Books. Other ISA's publications include the book series Sage Studies in International Sociology Books and ISA Handbooks. It also has published its own code of ethics.

ISA organizes World Congress of Sociology and Forum of Sociology (every four years). In addition ISA organizes a number of smaller, regional and thematic conferences.

== Organization ==
The statutes of ISA were first amended during the World Congress at Varna, and were subsequently amended again in 1974 at Toronto, 1978 at Uppsala, 1982 at Mexico City, 1986 at New Delhi, 1994 at Bielefeld and 2010 at Gothenburg.

At first, the governing body of ISA was the council of national representatives. The council elected the executive committee, which was composed of a President, three Vice-presidents, an Executive Secretary, and six other members. In 1970 ISA allowed general individual membership (previously it focused on organizational membership). Since then, ISA has both individual and collective members. Currently, the Council of National Associations is supplemented by the Research Council, which is composed individual representatives of all Research Committees. The two Councils hold the Assembly of Councils at the Congresses every four years, electing the President and other officials.

Scientific activities of the ISA occur under the auspices of research committees that gather sociologists interested in similar subfields or topics within sociology. As of 1997, there were 59 such groups with a total membership of 4442 individuals. The two largest groups at that time were Migration and Social Stratification. As of July 2012, ISA webpages listed 55 Research Committees, 3 Working Groups and 5 Thematic Groups. As of 1994, ISA had 45 national associations as its members. Currently its members come from 167 countries.

The ISA Junior Sociologists Network (JSN) is a global network of students, early-career academics and practitioners to share information and create collaborations.

ISA offices have changed their location several times; since 1987 they are located are in Madrid, Spain. Although at its beginning, the ISA's budget consisted mainly of UNESCO funds, the modern ISA budget is primarily (90%) composed of membership dues and sales of publications; only 10% comes from grants of UNESCO/ISSC.

The ISA is a member of the International Social Science Council with the status of the non-governmental organization in formal associate relations with UNESCO and special consultative status with the Economic and Social Council of the United Nations.

The recognized languages of the ISA are English, French and Spanish; English is the organization's administrative language.

=== ISA World Congresses ===
Since 1962, the ISA World Congress has taken place every four years in a different location; before that period, the Congresses were held every three years. The programme of the association and the number of participants at the congresses have grown rapidly since the first Congress met in Zürich, Switzerland (1950) with about 150 participants; the 1994 congress in Bielefeld, Germany, attracted 3,678 participants.

=== ISA Forums ===
The idea of the Forum gathers and redefines the traditionally organized ISA Research Council conference and the interim conferences of ISA Research Committees. It was an event with two kinds of programs: a general program conceived as a dialogue between Research Committees and made up of the papers presented by the RCs' delegates to the Research Council conference, and the parallel programs of the RCs organized by them. ISA Forums have been held in Barcelona (2008), Buenos Aires (2012), and Vienna (2016), with the next Forum to be held in Rabat, Morocco in 2025.

=== ISA Award for Excellence in Research and Practice ===
The ISA Award for Excellence in Research and Practice was established in March 2013. It is awarded to a sociologist who advances and promotes sociological knowledge and practice through outstanding contributions to the discipline, the profession, and the ISA. The award is presented every four years at the World Congress of the International Sociological Association at a special ISA awards ceremony. Immanuel Wallerstein was the first recipient of the award at the ISA World Congress of Sociology, Yokohama, Japan, 2014.

=== Foundation Mattei Dogan Award ===
A prominent sociologist is awarded the "Foundation Mattei Dogan Prize" in Sociology in recognition of their lifelong contributions to the progress of the field. After 2010, the prize awarded every four years at the ISA World Congress was discontinued. This award continued for other disciplines of the social sciences.

=== Survey on most influential works in sociology ===
In 1997, ISA conducted a survey of its membership to identify the 20th century's most influential books in sociology. Members were asked to name the five books that had the most influence on their own professional work. There were 455 respondents (16% of ISA's members), of whom 20.9% named Economy and Society by Max Weber, placing it first on the ISA list. The list was unveiled at the 1998 ISA congress.

== Political statements and actions ==
In June 2025, the ISA expressed solidarity with Iranian and Palestinian scholars and suspended the collective membership of the Israeli Sociological Society.

== List of ISA Presidents ==
The following individuals held or hold the title of ISA president:

1. 1949–1952 Louis Wirth, US
2. 1953–1956 Robert C. Angell, US
3. 1956–1959 Georges Friedmann, France
4. 1959–1962 Thomas Marshall, UK
5. 1962–1966 René König, Germany
6. 1966–1970 Jan Szczepański, Poland
7. 1970–1974 Reuben Hill, US
8. 1974–1978 Thomas Bottomore, UK
9. 1978–1982 Ulf Himmelstrand, Sweden
10. 1982–1986 Fernando Henrique Cardoso, Brazil
11. 1986–1990 Margaret Archer, UK
12. 1990–1994 T.K. Oommen, India
13. 1994–1998 Immanuel Wallerstein, US
14. 1998–2002 Alberto Martinelli, Italy
15. 2002–2006 Piotr Sztompka, Poland
16. 2006–2010 Michel Wieviorka, France
17. 2010–2014 Michael Burawoy, US
18. 2014–2018 Margaret Abraham, US
19. 2018–2023 Sari Hanafi, Lebanon
20. 2023–2027 Geoffrey Pleyers, Belgium

== List of ISA Vice-Presidents (2023-2027) ==
Position	Name	Affiliation
Vice-President for Research	Allison Loconto	Institut National de la Recherche Agronomique, France
Vice-President for National Associations	Bandana Purkayastha	University of Connecticut, USA
Vice-President for Publications	Marta Soler-Gallart	University of Barcelona, Spain
Vice-President for Finance and Membership	Elina Oinas	University of Helsinki, Finland

== Members of the ISA Executive Committee (2023-2027) ==
Name	Country
Talja Blokland	Germany
Mabrouk Boutagouga	Algeria
Chih-Jou Jay Chen	Taiwan
Debra Davidson	Canada
Stéphane Dufoix	France
Jan Marie Fritz	USA
Shaikh Mohammad Kais	Bangladesh
Michael Perry Okyerefo	Ghana
Aaron Pitluck	USA
Rhoda Reddock	Trinidad & Tobago
Ana Rivoir	Uruguay
Borut Roncevic	Slovenia
Hermílio Santos	Brazil
Nazanin Shahrokni	Iran & UK
Tina Uys	South Africa
Dan Woodman	Australia

== ISA Secretariat and Officers ==
Position	Name	Country
Executive Secretary	Cecilia Delgado-Molina	Mexico
Publications Officer	Lola Busuttil	France
Communications Officer	Anna-Maria Kutateladze	Georgia & Hong Kong
Membership Officer	Nataly Moreno	Colombia
Support Officer	Priscilla Torres	Argentina
Events Officer	Elena Velcheva	Bulgaria
