= René Lamps =

French politician

Mayor of Amiens
- In office 28 March 1971 – 24 March 1989
- Preceded by: Maurice Vast
- Succeeded by: Gilles de Robien

Personal details
- Born: 5 November 1915 Amiens, France
- Died: 8 May 2007 (aged 91) Amiens, France
- Party: French Communist Party
- Profession: Teacher

René Lamps (5 November 1915 – 8 May 2007) was a French politician. He began his career as a schoolteacher, and he served in the French Resistance during World War II. He served as a member of the National Assembly from 1945 to 1958, and from 1962 to 1978, representing Somme. He was also the mayor of Amiens from 1971 to 1983.
