= Jean-Claude Dessein =

French politician

- Born: 31 December 1925; Albert, Somme, France
- Died: 16 August 2011 (aged 85); Amiens, Somme, France
- Occupation: Politician
- Political party: Socialist Party

Jean-Claude Dessein (1925-2011) was a French politician. He started his career as a mathematics teacher, then served as deputy mayor of Amiens. He served as a member of the National Assembly from 1981 to 1993, representing Somme.
