= Pascale Boistard =

French politician (born 1971)

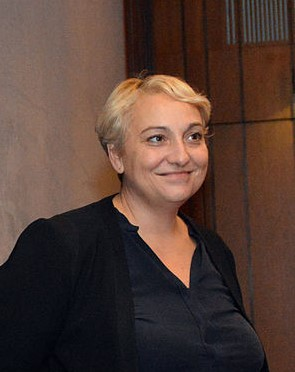
- Pascale Boistard

French Secretary of State for Women's Rights
- In office 26 August 2014 – 11 February 2016
- President: François Hollande
- Prime Minister: Manuel Valls
- Preceded by: Najat Vallaud-Belkacem

Personal details
- Born: 4 January 1971 (age 55) Mont-de-Marsan, France
- Party: Socialist Party
- Education: Paris 8 University

Pascale Boistard (born 4 January 1971) is a French politician of the Socialist Party (PS) who served as State Secretary for Women's Rights. She represented the Somme's 1st constituency in the National Assembly of France.

Ahead of the Socialist Party's 2017 primaries, Boistard publicly endorsed Manuel Valls as the party's candidate for the presidential election later that year.
