= List of people from Chernivtsi =

The following is a list of people from Chernivtsi.

== Natives ==
- Sophia Agranovich, American classical concert pianist, Centaur Records recording artist and music educator
- Aharon Appelfeld (1932–2018), Jewish writer
- Ninon Ausländer (1895–1966), art historian and wife of Hermann Hesse
- Rose Ausländer (1901–1988), Jewish German-language writer
- Elyakim Badian (1925–2000), Israeli politician
- Dmitry Bandura is a scientist, co-inventor of Mass cytometry
- Charles K. Bliss (1897–1985), inventor of Blissymbols
- Kasper Blond (1889–1964), Jewish surgeon, author, and inventor
- Klara Blum (1904–1971), Jewish German-language writer in Austria, the Soviet Union, and China
- Ion Bostan (1914–1992), Romanian film director
- Octav Botnar (1913–1998), Romanian businessman, philanthropist, billionaire
- Josef Burg (1912–2009), last Yiddish poet in Czernowitz
- Paul Celan (born Antschel; 1920–1970), Romanian-born, German-language writer, poet and translator
- Erwin Chargaff (1905–2002), Jewish biochemist
- Eugen Ehrlich (1862–1922), Jewish jurist
- Natalia Fedner (born 1983), American fashion designer, inventor and actress
- Rudolf Gerlach-Rusnak (1895–1960), German operatic and concert lyrical tenor
- Heorhiy Gina (1932–2025), musician and composer.
- Rubin Glucksmann (1889–1940), spy for the Soviet Union, father of the French philosopher André Glucksmann, grandfather of MEP Raphaël Glucksmann
- Radu Grigorovici (1911–2008), Romanian physicist
- Alexandru N. Hurmuzachi (1869–1946), Romanian politician
- Constantin N. Hurmuzachi (1863–1937), Romanian biologist
- Doxuță Hurmuzachi (1845–1931), Romanian jurist and politician
- Constantin Ritter von Isopescu-Grecul (or cavaler de Isopescu-Grecul; 1871–1938), Austro-Hungarian-born Romanian jurist, politician and journalist
- Frederick John Kiesler (1890–1965), theater designer, artist, theoretician and architect
- Ruth Klüger-Aliav (born Polishuk; 1914–1979), Romanian-Israeli Jewish activist
- Sam Kogan (1946–2004), stage director, actor and founding principal of the Academy of the Science of Acting and Directing in London
- Mila Kunis (born 1983), actress
- Eusebius Mandyczewski (1857–1929), Romanian musicologist, composer (Greek Orthodox)
- Itzik Manger (1901–1969), Jewish writer, who wrote in Yiddish
- Georg Marco (1863–1923), Austrian chess-player and author
- Volodymyr Melnykov (born 1951), Ukrainian poet, writer, songwriter, composer and public figure, Merited Figure of Arts of Ukraine
- Jan Mikulicz-Radecki (1850–1905), Polish surgeon
- Dan Pagis (1930–1986), Israeli writer
- Elena Pătrășcanu (1914–2000), Romanian stage designer
- Iacob Pistiner (1882–1930), lawyer and Member of the Romanian Parliament in the interwar years
- Traian Popovici (1892–1946), Romanian lawyer, mayor of Chernivtsi and Righteous Among the Nations
- Markus Reiner (1886–1976), one of the founders of rheology
- Gregor von Rezzori (born d'Arezzo; 1914–1998), Austrian Romanian German-language writer of Sicilian origin
- Ludwig Rottenberg (real name: Lazăr) (1864–1932), conductor and composer
- Ze'ev Sherf (1904–1984), Israeli Minister of Finance
- Viorica Ursuleac (1894–1985), Romanian opera singer (dramatic soprano)
- Richard M. Weiner (1930–2020), Romanian, later German theoretical physicist
- Mariya Yaremchuk, (born 1993), Ukrainian pop singer
- Arseniy Yatsenyuk (born 1974), lawyer, politician and Prime Minister of Ukraine from 2014 to 2016
- Constantin Zablovschi (1882–1967), Romanian engineer
- Frederic Zelnik (1885–1950), important German silent movie director-producer, born in Czernowitz

== Residents ==
- Vasile Alecsandri (1821–1890), Romanian writer, diplomat and politician
- Abraham Axelrad (1858–1925), Yiddish theater actor
- Hermann Bahr (1863–1934), Austrian writer, playwright, director and critic
- Grigore Vasiliu Birlic (1905–1970), Romanian actor of theater and cinema
- Nathan Birnbaum (1864–1937), Austrian writer and journalist, Jewish thinker and nationalist
- Alexandru Ioan Cuza (1820–1873), first ruler of the United Romanian Principalities
- Mihai Eminescu (1850–1889), the most famous and influential Romanian poet
- Iancu Flondor (1865–1924), Austro-Hungarian-born ethnic Romanian activist who advocated Bukovina's union with the Kingdom of Romania
- Karl Emil Franzos (1848–1904), Jewish writer and publicist, grew up in Czernowitz and wrote a literary memorial of the Jewish ghetto, The Jews of Barnow
- Gala Galaction, originally Grigore Pisculescu (1879–1961), Romanian writer
- Ion Grămadă (1886–1917), Austro-Hungarian-born Romanian writer, historian and journalist
- Eudoxiu Hurmuzachi (1812–1874), Romanian historian, politician
- Abraham Eliezer Eliyahu Ha-Levi Igel (1825–1892), Modern Orthodox rabbi, chief rabbi of Czernowitz and Bukovina
- Volodymyr Ivasyuk (1949–1979), Ukrainian songwriter, composer and poet
- Joseph Kalmer (1898–1959), Austrian writer, poet and translator
- Olha Kobylianska (1863–1942), Ukrainian modernist writer and feminist
- Mihail Kogălniceanu (1817–1891), Romanian historian and politician, Prime Minister of Romania
- Zvi Laron (born 1927), Israeli pediatric endocrinologist
- Anastasiya Markovich (born 1979), Ukrainian painter
- Miron Nicolescu (1903–1975), Romanian mathematician
- Ion Nistor (1876–1962), Romanian historian and politician
- Alexander von Petrino (1824–1899), Romanian Austro-Hungarian politician
- Israel Polack (1909–1993), Austro-Hungarian-born Romanian, Chilean and Israeli textile industrialist
- Ciprian Porumbescu (1853–1883), Romanian composer
- Aron Pumnul (1818–1866), Romanian philologist and teacher, national and revolutionary activist in Transylvania and Bukovina
- Wilhelm Reich (1897–1957), Jewish psychoanalyst and sexologist, born in Dobrzanica, went to school in Czernowitz
- Eugenia de Reuss Ianculescu (1865–1938), Romanian teacher, writer and women's rights activist
- Eric Roll (1907–2005), British academic economist, public servant and banker
- Josef Rosenfeld (1858–1922), Austro-Hungarian and Romanian rabbi
- Sofia Rotaru (born 1947), pop singer
- Maximilien Rubel (1905–1996), Marxist historian and council communist
- Wojciech Rubinowicz (1889–1974), Polish theoretical physicist
- Josef Schmidt (1904–1942), singer, actor and cantor
- Joseph Schumpeter (1883–1950), economist and Minister of Finance, 1909–1911 professor in Czernowitz
- Gheorghe Sion (1822–1892), Romanian writer
- Eliezer Steinbarg (Shtaynbarg; 1880–1932), Romanian teacher and Yiddish poetic fabulist
- Wilhelm Stekel (1868–1940), Jewish psychoanalyst and sexologist, born in Boiany, Bukovina, grew up in Czernowitz and attended the Gymnasium (grammar school)
- Vasile Tărâțeanu (1945–2022), journalist and writer
- Nazariy Yaremchuk (1951–1995), Hutsul Ukrainian singer
