= Yela =

Yela may refer to:

- Yela Island, an island in Papua New Guinea
- Yela, Liberia. a town in Liberia
- Yela language, a language spoken in the Democratic Republic of the Congo
- Rafael Yela Günther (1888–1942), Guatemalan painter and sculptor
- Yelawolf (1979-), American rapper

== See also ==
- Yella (disambiguation)
- Jela
