= Thomas Porcher =

French economist and author (born 1977)

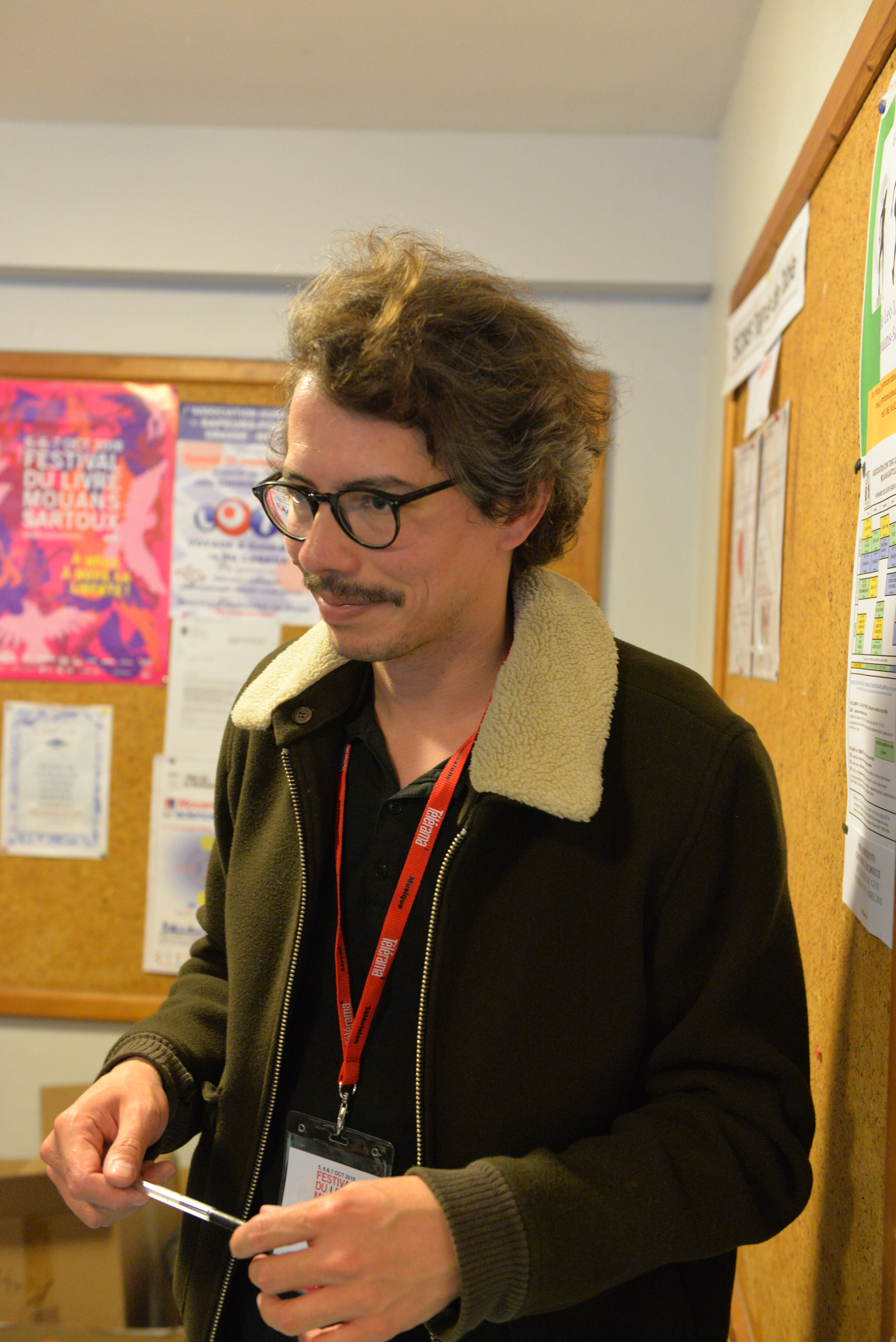
- Thomas Porcher during the book fair of Mouans-Sartoux in October 2018
- Born: 5 July 1977 (age 49); Drancy, France
- Occupations: Economist, writer

Thomas Porcher (born 5 July 1977) is a French economist and author. He is a member of the heterodox association of economists called Économistes atterrés.

== Early life and education ==
Thomas Porcher's father was a management teacher of Vietnamese origin and his mother a seamstress of Italian origin. He was a black belt of karaté at 16 years old.

After his baccalauréat, Porcher obtained a licence, then a doctorate on Economics at the Pantheon-Sorbonne University.

== Career ==
Porcher is an associate professor of Economics at the Paris School of Business.

He has published more than ten books. His book Treatise of Heretic Economy (released in 2018) is a bestseller in France that has sold more than 50,000 copies. His essay "The neglected" (released in February 2020) makes "a rapid entry into the best sales. Printed in 13,000 copies, it was reprinted in 2000 four days after its release."

Porcher is regularly invited to French media outlets. The RePEc collective ranks him the 38th most followed economist in the world on Twitter, out of 1068 identified economists.

== Political career ==
In 2018, Porcher along with Raphaël Glucksmann funded and supported the centre-left political party Place Publique ("Public Place").

On 16 March 2019, Place Publique and the Socialist Party announced that they would present a joint list of candidates for the European Parliament election, with Raphaël Glucksmann at the head of the list. Porcher left the party the same day, denouncing what he called a "list of apparatchiks".

== Personal life ==
He was in a relationship with actress Elodie Yung for 14 years. Since 2011, he has been with lawyer Sarah Salesse, daughter of Yves Salesse, a figure of unionism in France.

== Publications ==
- 2009, Un baril de pétrole contre 100 mensonges, Res publica éditions ISBN 2358100013
- 2009, Reprise ou Re-crise ?, Res publica éditions ISBN 2358100080
- 2010, Recettes pétrolières et financement de la lutte contre la pauvreté: le cas de la République du Congo, Éditions universitaires européennes ISBN 6131536031
- 2012, L'indécence précède l'essence - Enquête sur un Total scandale, Max Milo Éditions ISBN 2315003512
- 2013, Le Mirage du gaz de schiste, Max Milo Éditions ISBN 2315004667, 2315003512
- 2014, TAFTA : l'accord du plus fort, Max Milo Éditions ISBN 2315006147
- 2015, 20 idées reçues sur l'énergie (with R.H. Boroumand, S. Goutte), De Boeck ISBN 280419020X
- 2015, Le Déni climatique (with H. Landes), Max Milo Éditions ISBN 231500702X
- 2016, Introduction inquiète à la Macron-économie (with F. Farah), Les Petits matins ISBN 2363832167
- 2016, Sortir de l'impasse : appel des 138 économistes (collective work), Les liens qui libèrent ISBN 9791020904072
- 2017, La politique est à nous (collective work), Robert Laffont ISBN 2221200349
- 2018, Traité d'économie hérétique : en finir avec le discours dominant, Fayard ISBN 978-2213705903
- 2018, Macron : un mauvais tournant (Les économistes atterrés with H. Sterdyniak, D. Cayla, A. Jatteau, D. Lang, P. Légé, C. Mathieu, T. Porcher, C. Ramaux, G. Rotillon), Les liens qui libèrent ISBN 979-1020904768
- 2020, Les délaissés. Comment transformer un bloc divisé en force majoritaire, Fayard, ISBN 978-2213711959
- 2024, L'économie pour les 99% (with Ludivine Stock (drawing) and Raphaël Ruffier-Fossoul), Stock, graphic book, ISBN 978- 2234098381
