= Thomas Pellerin-Carlin =

French politician (born 1989)

Thomas Pellerin-Carlin MEP
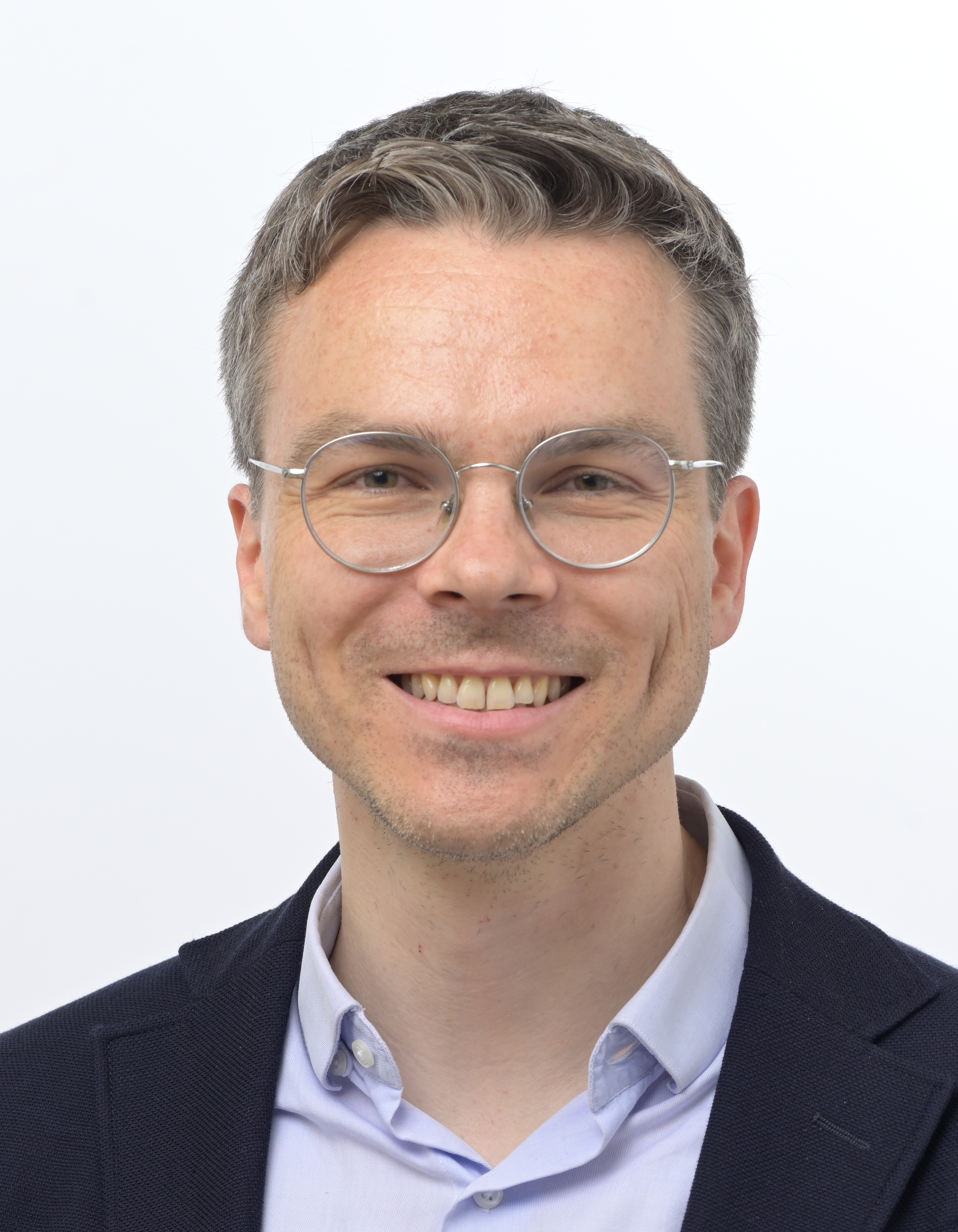

Member of the European Parliament
- Incumbent
- Assumed office 16 July 2024
- Constituency: France

Personal details
- Born: 5 November 1989 (age 36)
- Party: Place Publique
- Other political affiliations: Party of European Socialists
- Education: Sciences Po Lille; College of Europe

Thomas Pellerin-Carlin, born on November 5, 1989, in Caen, is a French politician, researcher, and member of the European Parliament elected in 2024.

== Academic background ==
He holds a master's degree in European Political and Administrative Studies from the College of Europe in Bruges, as well as a master's degree in European Affairs from the Institute of Political Studies in Lille. He also underwent reserve officer training in the staff pathway at the 4th Battalion of the French Special Military Academy of Saint-Cyr and at the Advanced School for Reserve Staff Officer Specialists (ESORSEM).

== Professional career ==
In 2016, he worked as a researcher at the Jacques Delors Institute, specializing in European energy policy and European defense policy. Between 2022 and 2024, he worked for I4CE - Institute for Climate Economics.

In June 2024, as a member of the Place publique party, he was elected Member of the European Parliament on the joint list of Place publique and the Socialist Party, led by Raphaël Glucksmann.

Engaged in activism since his teenage years, he has stated that he served as a military reservist and was a member of the Young Socialists.

In 2025 he was a joint winner of the MEP Awards for Best Newcomer.
