= 2013 Alsace single territorial collectivity referendum =

2013 Referendum in Eastern France

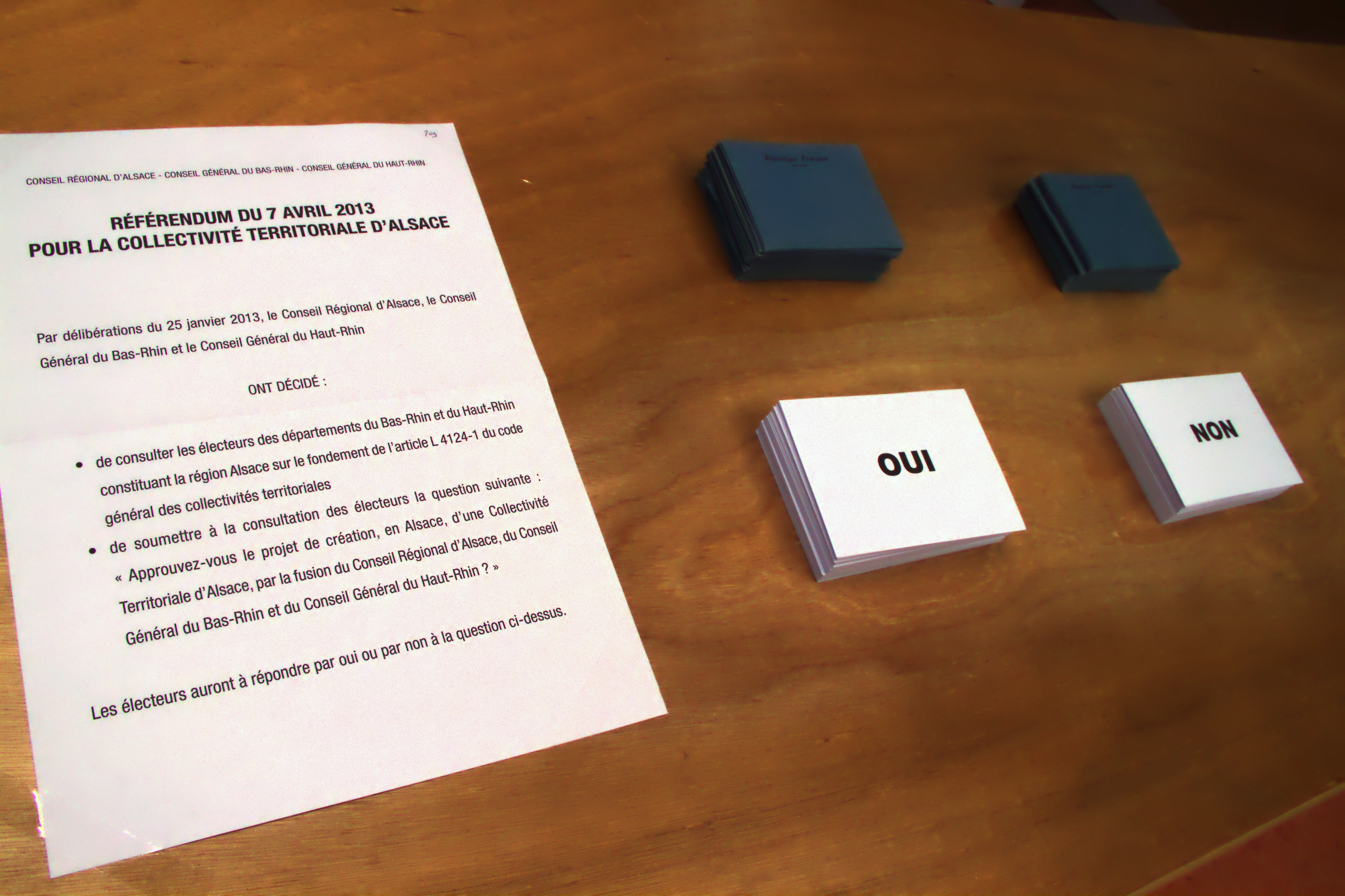
Ballot papers of the 2013 Alsace single territorial collectivity referendum.

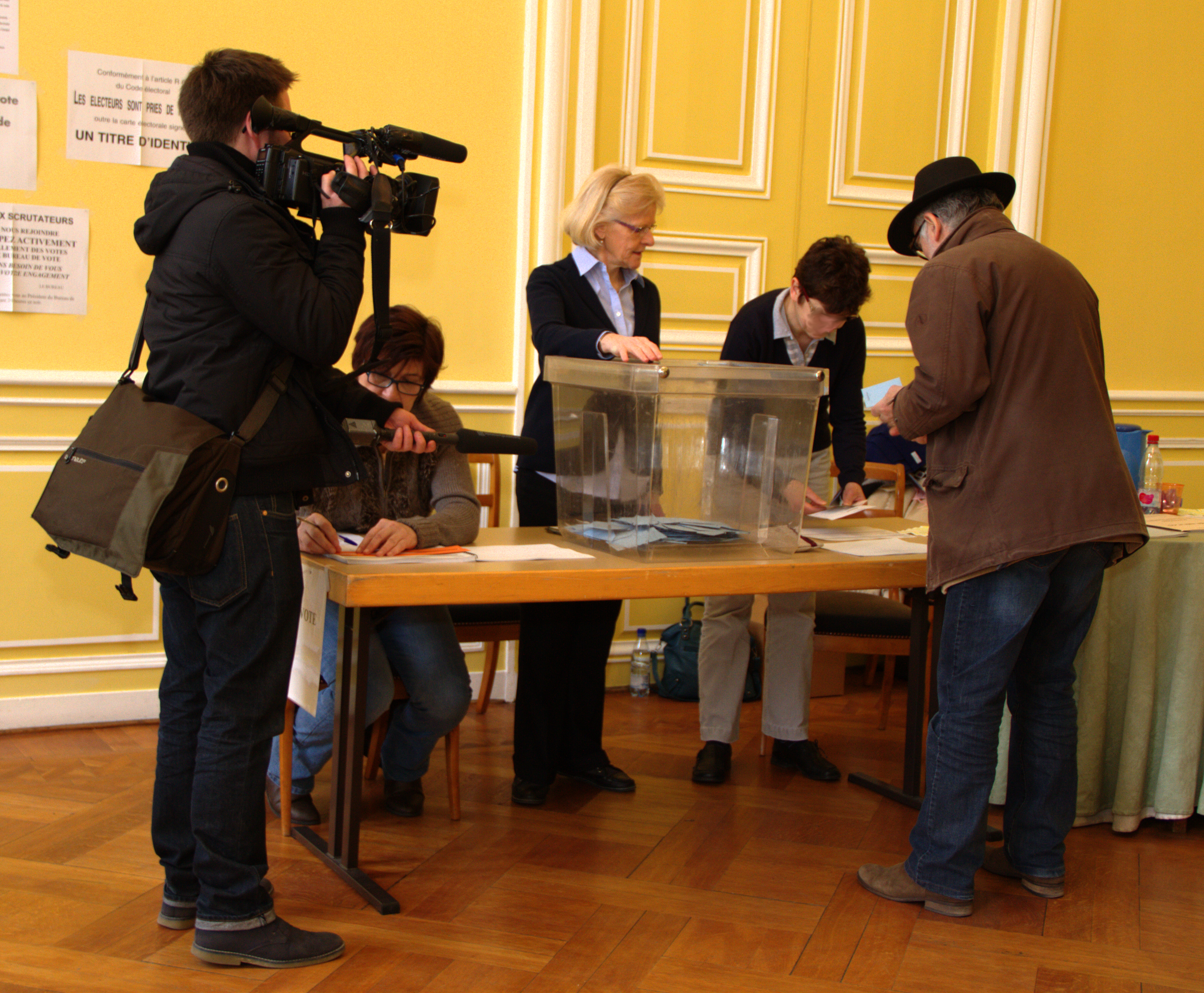
Voting during the referendum in Strasbourg (Bas-Rhin).

The Alsace single territorial collectivity referendum (French: référendum sur la Collectivité territoriale d'Alsace) was a referendum held on Sunday, 7 April 2013 in Alsace, France, which aimed at the creation of the single territorial collectivity of Alsace through the merging of the regional council of Alsace and the departmental councils of Bas-Rhin and Haut-Rhin. Even though there was a 57.65% majority of "Yes" votes, the project was not approved, as two other requirements (a majority in favour in both departments and a voter quorum) were not met.

== Criteria ==
In order for the proposal to be approved, the votes in favour needed to be a majority in both departments (and at least 50% overall) and represent at least 25% of eligible voters (188,027 votes in Bas-Rhin and 130,439 votes in Haut-Rhin).

== Opinions ==
=== Political parties ===
NB: These are the opinions expressed by the national boards of each party, even if there might be different opinions inside the parties.

==== Yes ====
- Union for a Popular Movement
- Europe Ecology – The Greens
- Democratic Movement
- Unser Land
- Alsace d'abord
- Union of Democrats and Independents

==== No ====
- National Front, officially from 11 March
- Left Front (France) (including Left Party and French Communist Party)
- New Anticapitalist Party
- Debout la République
- Citizen and Republican Movement
- Republican Popular Union

==== No opinion ====
- Socialist Party (France) (PS)
  - PS 68 and independent elected representatives – Alsace: Yes
  - Intergroup of socialists and republicans from Alsace: No

=== Opinions of politicians ===
In alphabetical order

- Support : François Bayrou (MoDem), André Bord (ex-RPR), Charles Buttner (UMP), Jean-François Copé (UMP), Jacques Fernique (EELV), Laurent Furst (UMP), Henri Goetschy (MoDem), Daniel Hoeffel (DVD), Guy-Dominique Kennel (UMP), Hervé Morin (NC), Philippe Richert (UMP), Jo Spiegel (PS), Yann Wehrling (MoDem).
- Against : François Asselineau (UPR), Martine Binder (FN), Nicolas Dupont-Aignan (DLR), Nicolas Chevalier-Roch (DLR), Pierre Freyburger (PS), Constant Goerg (DVD), Pierre Laurent (PCF), Marine Le Pen (FN), Jean-Luc Mélenchon (PG), Gilbert Meyer (UMP), Raphaël Nisand (PS).

== Results ==
	Bas-Rhin				Haut-Rhin				Alsace overall			
	Voters		Registered		Voters		Registered		Voters		Registered	
	Votes	%	%	Required quorum	Votes	%	%	Required quorum	Voix	%	%	Required quorum
For	172,137	67.53	22.08	25%	83,266	44.26	15.96	25%	255,403	57.62	20.05	25%
Against	82,777	32.47	11.01		104,846	55.74	20.10		187,623	42.35	14.73	
Valid votes	254,914	96.62	33.89		188,112	97.04	36.05		443,026	96.80	34.78	
Blank/invalid votes	8,923	3.38	1.19		5,736	2.96	1.10		14,659	3.20	1.15	
Total	268,837	100.00	35.11		193,848	100.00	37.18		457,685	100.00	35.96	
Abstentions	487,690		64.89		327,473		62.82		815,163		64.04	
Registered voters	751,527		100.00		521,321		100.00		1,272,848		100.00	

=== Bas-Rhin ===
No; 82,777 (32.47%)	Yes; 172,137 (67.53%)
▲

=== Haut-Rhin ===
No; 104,846 (55.74%)	Yes; 83,266 (44.26%)
▲

=== Debates after the poll ===
The negative result of the April referendum was called into question in July 2013 as part of the draft law concerning the "modernization of territorial public action" and the "affirmation of metropolises", with amendment no 745 of UMP MP Hervé Gaymard abolishing the requirement for a referendum consultation to change the size of local authorities. After several delays, the Mixed Parity Committee finally abolished it in December 2013. However, on 25 June 2014, an amendment by rapporteur Michel Delebarre (PS), adopted on 4 July, "abolishes the compulsory consultation of voters in the event of a change in the boundaries of regions and departments as well as in the event of a merger".

In Alsace, on 22 September 2014, the elected representatives of the two general councils and those of the regional council voted 101 out of 122 in favour of a motion for the return of the council of Alsace as the only alternative to the territorial reform of the government which proposes the merger of Alsace, Lorraine and Champagne-Ardenne. A demonstration with ambivalent demands (against the Grand Est region, but also for the single council of Alsace) was co-organized by the regional elected representatives on 11 October, with the implementation of a single TER fare at €5 for demonstrators, throughout the region (the prefect has also announced that he will initiate a check of its legality). It brings together 7,000 to 8,000 people according to the authorities and 10,000 to 20,000 according to the organizers. In the debates of the Senate, which finally ended in favour of a unified Alsace in some form, the question of a single council of Alsace has also come up regularly on the table.

The two departments would eventually be grouped together into the European Collectivity of Alsace in January 2021.
