= Neustadtl =

The term Neustadtl is the German name for:

- Nové Mesto nad Váhom in Slovakia
- Nové Město na Moravě in the Czech Republic
- Novo Mesto in Slovenia

The Neustadtl score is a scoring system often used to break ties in chess tournaments

- Neustadtl score
