= Rubin Glucksmann =

Austro-Hungarian political activist (1889–1940)

- Born: Rubin Glücksmann; 19 May 1889; Czernowitz, Duchy of Bukovina, Austria-Hungary
- Died: 2 July 1940 (aged 51); Atlantic Ocean (approx. 140 km off the Irish coast)
- Cause of death: Shipwreck (sinking of the SS Arandora Star)
- Known for: Communist International (Comintern) operative, Soviet intelligence officer
- Political party: Palestine Communist Party
- Spouse: Martha Bass
- Children: André Glucksmann
- Relatives: Raphaël Glucksmann (grandson)
- Espionage activity
- Allegiance: Austria-Hungary; Soviet Union
- Corporation: WOSTWAG

Rubin Glucksmann (sometimes spelled Glücksmann; 19 May 1889 – 2 July 1940) was an Austro-Hungarian-born political activist, Communist International (Comintern) agent, and Soviet intelligence operative who was active across Western and Central Europe during the interwar period. Initially active in Labor Zionism, he later joined the Palestine Communist Party and operated clandestinely on behalf of the Soviet Union under commercial cover, notably through the Soviet front trading company WOSTWAG.

He was the father of the French philosopher André Glucksmann and the grandfather of the politician and Member of the European Parliament Raphaël Glucksmann. He died at sea in July 1940 when the British deportee ship SS Arandora Star was torpedoed by a German submarine.

== Biography ==
=== Early life and political beginnings ===
Rubin Glucksmann was born on 19 May 1889 into a Jewish family in Czernowitz, then part of the Duchy of Bukovina in Austria-Hungary (now Ukraine). His surname translates literally as "lucky man".

During World War I, Glucksmann served in the Austro-Hungarian Army. After the war and the subsequent incorporation of Bukovina into the Kingdom of Romania (which renamed the city Cernăuți), he returned briefly to his hometown. In 1919, he relocated to Vienna, where he worked for the newspaper Yedies, a publication affiliated with the Marxist-Zionist party Poale Zion.

In the early 1920s, Glucksmann emigrated to Mandatory Palestine as an activist of the Zionist left. While living there, he and his future wife, Martha Bass, broke with left-wing Zionism and joined the Palestine Communist Party.

=== Comintern and intelligence work ===
Toward the end of the 1920s, Glucksmann was recruited by Soviet intelligence services operating under the direction of the Communist International (Comintern). He relocated with his family to Hamburg, Germany, adopting the civilian cover of an insurance agent, which allowed him to travel widely throughout Central Europe and the Soviet Union without raising suspicion.

In Hamburg, he worked for Soviet-controlled commercial networks, primarily WOSTWAG (West-Osteuropäische Warenaustausch Aktiengesellschaft). While nominally an import-export enterprise, Wostwag served as a key front organization for the Comintern and Soviet military intelligence, facilitating the covert transport of industrial machinery, logistical assets, and, on occasion, material tied to arms trafficking.

Following Adolf Hitler's rise to power in Germany in 1933, Glucksmann and his family fled to France to escape Nazi persecution, settling in the Paris suburb of Boulogne-Billancourt. He continued his clandestine assignments for the Comintern and, following the outbreak of the Spanish Civil War in 1936, facilitated logistics and the procurement of supplies for the Spanish Republican forces.

Later, Glucksmann relocated alone to London, where he assumed directorship of the Far Eastern Fur Trading Company, using the business as an operational cover.

=== Arrest and death ===
On 17 May 1940, amidst British wartime security roundups, Glucksmann was arrested by British authorities on grounds related to his nationality and political history. Later that year, he was detained again under suspicion of espionage and placed in internment pending deportation to Canada.

On 2 July 1940, Glucksmann was aboard the requisitioned British ocean liner SS Arandora Star, which was carrying over a thousand German and Italian internees and prisoners of war to St. John's, Newfoundland. Approximately 140 kilometres (87 mi) northwest of the coast of Ireland, the ship was torpedoed and sunk by the German submarine U-47. Glucksmann was among the more than 800 people who lost their lives in the sinking.

== Personal life and legacy ==
Glucksmann was married to fellow communist activist Martha Bass. Their son, André Glucksmann (1937–2015), became a prominent French philosopher, writer, and leading figure of the Nouveaux Philosophes (New Philosophers) movement. His grandson, Raphaël Glucksmann (born 1979), is a French journalist, essayist, and politician who founded the political party Place Publique and was elected to the European Parliament.

=== In media ===
Glucksmann's clandestine career is the central focus of the television documentary Les Glucksmann, une histoire de famille, directed by Steve Jourdin and broadcast on the French television network Public Sénat on 31 January 2026. The film uncovers previously unpublished archival material detailing his Comintern operations and intelligence work, which his grandson Raphaël discovered during filming, placing these revelations in context with the later intellectual and political trajectories of both André and Raphaël Glucksmann.
