= Jela =

Jela is a Slavic female given name. Notable people with this name include:

- Jela Cello (born 1987), Serbian cellist
- Jela Krečič (born 1979), Slovenian writer and journalist
- Jela Spiridonović-Savić (1890–1974), Serbian poet
- Jela Špitková (born 1947), Slovak/Austrian violinist
