= Yeller =

Yeller may refer to:

- someone who yells
- Old Yeller, a novel by Fred Gipson
- Old Yeller (1957 film), film based on Gipson's novel

== See also ==
- Yella (disambiguation)
