= Lukáš Milo =

Lukáš Milo (born 19 October 1983 in Vitkov) is a track and field sprint athlete who competes internationally for the Czech Republic.

Milo represented the Czech Republic at the 2008 Summer Olympics in Beijing. He competed at the 100 metres sprint and placed 5th in his heat without advancing to the second round. He ran the distance in a time of 10.52 seconds.
