= André Glucksmann =

French philosopher, activist, and writer (1937–2015)

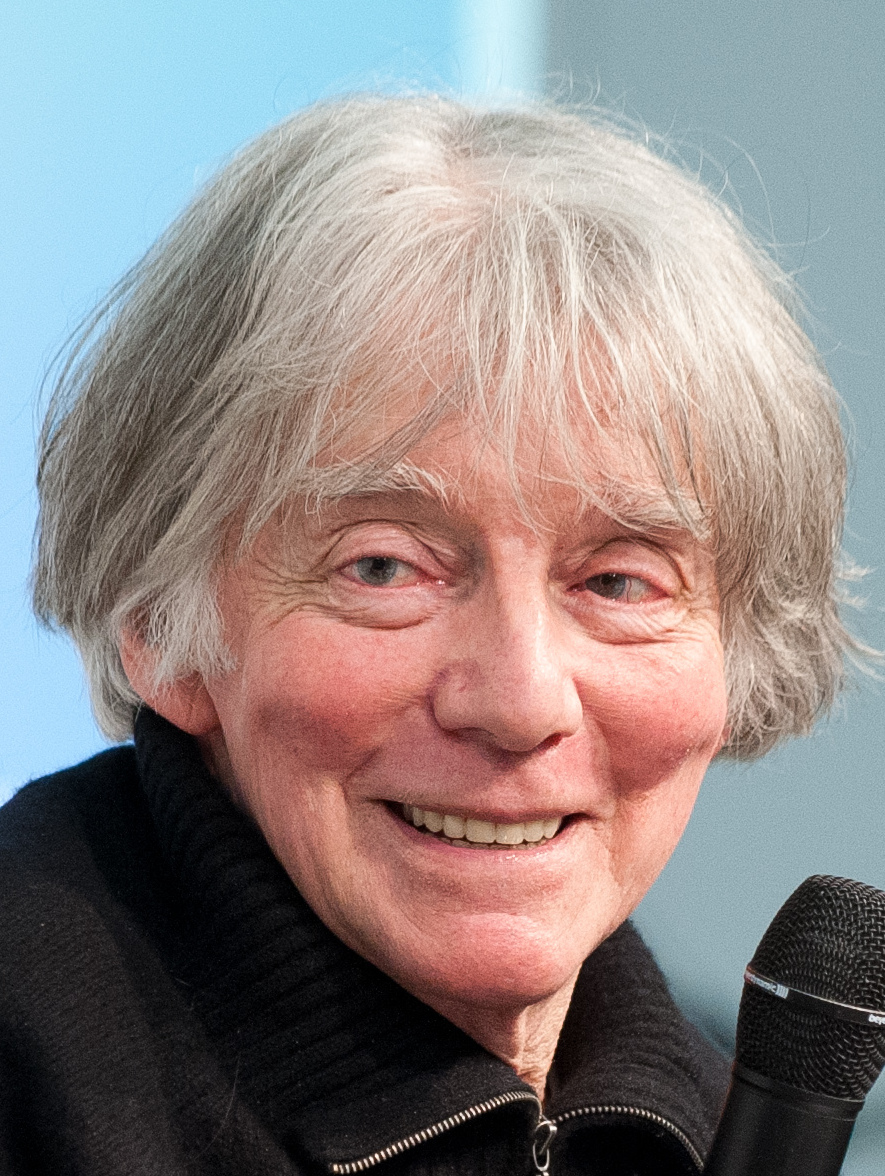
- Glucksmann in 2012
- Born: 19 June 1937; Boulogne-Billancourt, France
- Died: 10 November 2015 (aged 78); Paris, France

Education
- Education: École normale supérieure de Saint-Cloud

Philosophical work
- Era: 20th-, 21st-century philosophy
- Region: Western philosophy
- School: Continental philosophy Nouveaux Philosophes
- Main interests: Political philosophy

André Glucksmann (French: [ɡlyksman]; 19 June 1937 – 10 November 2015) was a French philosopher, activist, and writer. He was a leading figure of the new philosophers. Glucksmann began his career as a Marxist, who went on to reject Marxism–Leninism and "real-existing socialism" in the popular book La Cuisinière et le Mangeur d'Hommes (1975), and later positioned himself on the Chinese side of the Sino-Soviet split, becoming an outspoken critic of the Soviet Union and post-Soviet Russian foreign policy. He was a strong supporter of human rights. In later years, he opposed the claim that Islamic terrorism is the product of the clash of civilizations between Islam and the Western world.

== Early years ==
André Glucksmann was born in 1937 in Boulogne-Billancourt, the son of Ashkenazi Jewish parents from Austria-Hungary. His father was from Czernowitz in northern Bukovina, which later became part of Romania and is now in Ukraine, and his mother from Prague, which later became the capital of Czechoslovakia.

Glucksmann's father, Rubin Glucksmann, was a Soviet spy, arrested for espionage on 17 May 1940, and sent to a camp near London. He died on 2 July 1940, in the sinking of the SS Arandora Star, which was taking him to Canada to be interned as an "enemy agent". His mother and sister were active in the French Resistance. The family "narrowly escaped deportation to the camps" during the Holocaust, which influenced Glucksmann's developing ideas of "the state as the ultimate source of barbarism". He studied at the Lycée la Martinière in Lyon, and later enrolled at École normale supérieure de Saint-Cloud. His first book, Le Discours de la Guerre, was published in 1968.

== Career ==
=== Early career ===
In 1975, Glucksmann published the anti-Communist book La Cuisinière et le Mangeur d'Hommes, which was subtitled Réflexions sur l'État, le marxisme et les camps de concentration, in which he argued that Marxism–Leninism leads inevitably to totalitarianism, tracing parallels between the crimes of Nazism and Communist states. In his next book, Les Maîtres penseurs, published in 1977 and translated into English as Master Thinkers (Harper & Row, 1980), he traced the intellectual justification for totalitarianism back to the ideas articulated by various German philosophers, such as Fichte, Hegel, Marx, and Nietzsche. In the years after the Vietnam War, Glucksmann rose to national prominence after expressing his support for Vietnamese boat people. He began working with Bernard-Henri Lévy criticizing communism. Both had formerly been well-known Marxists. Shortly afterward they became known, along with others of their generation who rejected Marxism, as New Philosophers, a term coined by Lévy.

=== 1980s and 1990s ===
In 1985, Glucksmann signed a petition to then United States president Ronald Reagan urging him to continue his support for the Contras in Nicaragua. After the fall of the Berlin Wall, Glucksmann became an advocate for the use of nuclear power. In 1995, he supported the resumption of nuclear tests by the-then French president Jacques Chirac. He supported the NATO intervention in Serbia in 1999. He also called for Chechnya to become independent.

=== Philosophy ===
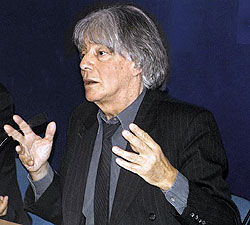
Glucksmann speaking at a conference in Paris, 2002

In his book Dostoyevsky in Manhattan, Glucksmann asserts that nihilism, particularly as depicted by Dostoyevsky in his novels Demons and The Brothers Karamazov, is the 'characteristic form' of modern terrorism. Drawing on Ivan Karamazov's dictum that "If there is no God, everything is permitted", Glucksmann argues: "The inner nature of nihilistic terrorism is that everything is permissible, whether because God exists and I am his representative, or because God does not exist and I take his place."

His 2006 book Une rage d'enfant is an autobiography which talks about how his experiences as a young Jew in occupied France led to his interest in philosophy and his belief in the importance of intervention. He wrote: "My style of thinking is to compare what happens on the TV, in the news and so on, and then extract what I can from books of philosophers to understand it. Philosophy for me is like subtitles. The problem comes from current events but the answer is supplied by philosophy."

Glucksmann criticised the notion that Islamic terrorism is a product of the clash of civilizations between Islam and the West, arguing that the first victims of Islamic terrorism are Muslims. He wrote: "Why do the 200,000 slaughtered Muslims of Darfur not arouse even half a quarter of the fury caused by 200-times fewer dead in Lebanon? Must we deduce that Muslims killed by other Muslims don't count – whether in the eyes of Muslim authorities or viewed through the bad conscience of the West?"

=== Later years ===
Glucksmann supported military action by the West in Afghanistan and Iraq, and was highly critical of Russian foreign policy, supporting for example Chechen independence (for which he was posthumously awarded the Order of Friendship by the Chechen government in exile). He was against the Abkhazian and South Ossetian independence from Georgia, arguing that Georgia is essential to maintaining European Union "energy independence", vis-a-vis Russia, through access to oil and gas reserves in the former Soviet republics, stating: "If Tbilisi falls, there will be no way to get around Gazprom and guarantee autonomous access to the gas and petroleum wealth of Azerbaijan, Turkmenistan, and Kazakhstan."

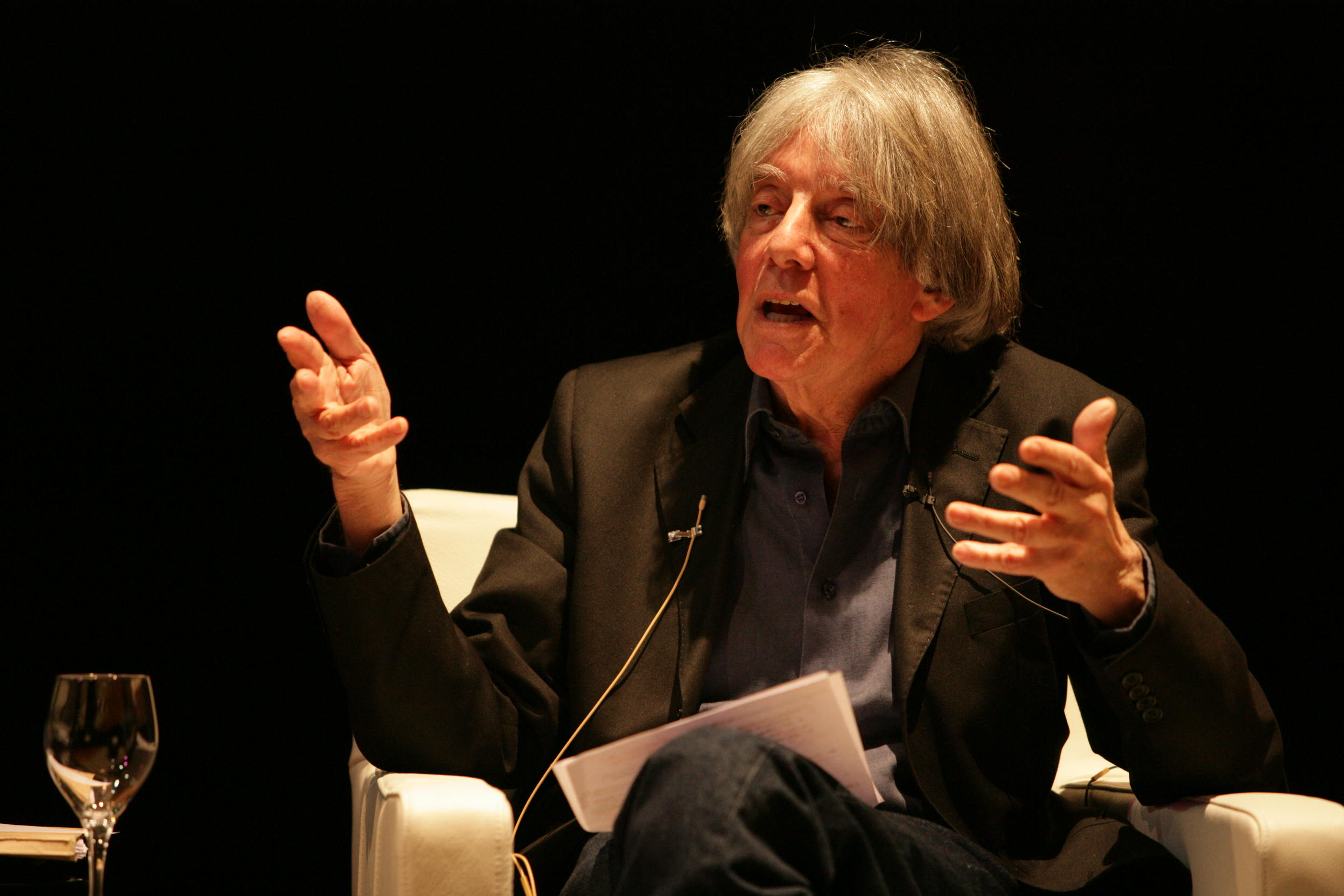
Glucksmann in Festival SOS 4.8 in Murcia, 2009

As evidence of Russia's plans to use energy blackmail, Glucksmann referenced a biting anti-Gazprom satirical song performed at the annual satirical award show "Silver Rubber Boot", which made jokes like: "If the Eurovision Song Contest denies victory to Russia again, we are going to drive to their concert and block their gas with our bodies!" Glucksmann cited this as evidence that the Russian people want to cut off gas to Ukraine and Europe. He wrote: "Consider a popular song performed by a military choir in Moscow. Its chorus depicts the 'radiant future' that Gazprom is preparing: 'Europe has a problem with us? We will cut off its gas...' The Russian public loves the song."

Glucksmann supported Nicolas Sarkozy in the 2007 French presidential election. In August 2008, he co-signed an open letter with Václav Havel, Desmond Tutu, and Wei Jingsheng calling upon the Chinese authorities to respect human rights both during and after the 2008 Summer Olympics. He was also a signatory of the Prague Declaration on European Conscience and Communism.

== Death ==
Glucksmann died in Paris on 10 November 2015 at the age of 78. In reaction to his death, the then French president François Hollande said that Glucksmann always "listened to the suffering of peoples". Former president and opposition leader Nicolas Sarkozy commented on Glucksmann's death by saying: "[Glucksmann] turned a page in French thought from the second half of the 20th Century."

== Personal life ==
His first wife (1958–1974) was the philosopher Christine Buci. He then married in March 1981 Françoise Villette, daughter of the Communist philosopher Jeannette Colombel. Their only child was Raphaël Glucksmann, who became a social democratic politician.

== Works ==
Note: Many of his works were translated into German by his long-term colleague Helmut Kohlenberger.

- Voltaire Counter-Attacks (Voltaire contre-attaque) (2014)
- A Child's Rage (Une rage d'enfant) (2006)
- The Discourse of Hate (Le Discours de la haine) (2004)
- West Versus West (Ouest contre Ouest) (2003)
- Dostoevsky in Manhattan (Dostoïevski à Manhattan) (2002)
- The Third Death of God (La Troisième Mort de Dieu) (2000)
- Silence, Killing in Process (Silence, on tue) (1986) (with Thierry Wolton)
- Stupidity (La Bêtise) (1985)
- Cynicism and Passion (Cynisme et passion) (1981/1999)
- The Force of Vertigo (La Force du vertige) (1983)
- The Master Thinkers (Les Maîtres penseurs) (1977)

== Honours and awards ==
- Officier of the Order of Legion of Honour (2009)
- Order of the Cross of Terra Mariana

== Interviews ==
- "An Interview with Andre Glucksman". Telos 33 (Fall 1977). New York: Telos Press.
- "Solzhenitsyn's Children", from 49:30
