= Helmut Kohlenberger =

German philosopher, writer and lecturer (born 1942)

Helmut Kohlenberger (born 1942 in Vítkov) is a German philosopher, translator, editor and university lecturer at both the Universities of Vienna and Salzburg. He is the author of several works, including The European Idea and Culture, Theoretical issues of the Middle Ages and Modernism.

== Biography ==
Kohlenberger was born in Wigstadtl in Reichsgau Sudetenland of Nazi Germany (now Vítkov in the Czech Republic) in 1942 but was schooled in postwar West Germany. He studied the history of philosophy in the German 19th-century tradition, Kant and Hegel, at the University of Tübingen. He also worked with Friedrich Tenbruck on sociological questions in the Max Weber tradition.

Kohlenberger continued Medieval studies at the University of Bochum and then worked in the field of medieval philosophy, the development of universities and the collapse of the Christian values in modern society.

He joined Raymond Klibansky on the Oxford committee for Medieval studies and spent thirty years working on the UNESCO sponsored International Bibliography of Philosophy.

He was associated with Jan Patočka and the Charta 77 movement in Prague in the 1960s and '70s.

He was an employee of the magazine Tumult which covered Transport Economics of Vienna & Munich.

He taught the History of Ideas at the University of Vienna in 1973–1987, plus working for Austrian Radio. Since the late 1980s he has taught at the University of Salzburg plus lecturing abroad, translating and participating on editorial boards. He translated texts by André Glucksmann from French into German, and was an editor of the magazine Stredni Europe (Central Europe).

== Publications ==
- Similitudo und Ratio (1972)
- Die Wahrheit des Ganzen (1976)
- Von der Notwendigkeit der Philosophie in der Gegenwart: Festschrift für Karl Ulmer zum 60.(1976)
- Cuando el jego va en serio (1991)
- Gesellschaftstheorien in Österreich (with R. Knoll, 1994)
- Briefe über Deutschland (1996)
- 25 Years (1969–1994) of Anselm Studies (Editor, 1996)
- Reason, Action, and Experience: Essays in Honor of Raymond Klibansky, (Editor, 1998)
- Von der Romantik zur ästhetischen Religion (Contributor, 2004)
- Rechtsphilosophie: Vom Grundlagenfach zur Transdisziplinarität in den Rechts-, Wirtschafts- und Sozialwissenschaften. (Contributor 2010)
- How the West was Won: Essays on the Literary Imagination, the Canon, (Contributor, The Monastic Challenge, 2010)
- Prozeß, Spiel: Fragmente zum 2. Jahrtausend (with Willi Donner, 2013)
