= Josef Rosenfeld =

Personal life
- Born: יוסף רוזנפלד; December 25, 1858 Neustadtl, Austrian Empire
- Died: September 17, 1922 (aged 63) Frankfurt am Main, German Reich
- Education: University of Leipzig
- Known for: Chief Rabbi of Czernowitz
- Occupation: Rabbi, educator

Religious life
- Religion: Judaism
- Denomination: Judaism
- Yeshiva: Rabbinical Seminary of Budapest

Josef Rosenfeld (1858–1922) was an Austro-Hungarian and Romanian rabbi and educator, who served as the Chief Rabbi of Czernowitz/Cernăuți (today Chernivtsi) from 1893 to 1922.

== Biography ==
Rosenfeld was born on 25 December 1858 in the town of Neustadtl (in present-day Slovakia), to Meir, who served as Av Beit Din (head of the rabbinical court) in his hometown. In his youth, he graduated from a high school in Miskolc, then he moved to Budapest to study at the Rabbinical Seminary, where he was a student of Wilhelm Bacher.

In 1883, he was ordained as a rabbi in Berlin and received a Ph.D. from the University of Leipzig. He subsequently served as a rabbi for the Hamburg Jewish community. The more modern members of the congregation regarded him as holding rather traditional views, and as a result, they influenced the local government not to grant him German citizenship, which at that time was required for rabbis in Germany.

From 1886 to 1893, Rosenfeld served as Chief Rabbi of the Jewish community in Orosháza, Hungary. In 1892, he was elected unanimously as the rabbi of Altona and Schleswig-Holstein, but, because he did not hold German citizenship, he served for only one year. The same year, the Chief Rabbi of the Jewish community of Czernowitz, Abraham Eliezer Eliyahu Ha-Levi Igel, passed away, and Rosenfeld was appointed to succeed him a year later. During his tenure, he promoted education in Jewish studies and Jewish literature among the city's Jewish youth. He was also a member of the National Zionist Committee until his death.

He continued to hold the position of chief rabbi of the city after the union of Bukovina with Romania in 1918. Rosenfeld held this position until his death in 1922. On 16 May 1920, the he greeted King Ferdinand I of Romania during his visit to Grand Synagogue of the city.

Josef Rosenfeld died on 17 September 1922 in Frankfurt am Main, Germany, and was buried in the local Jewish cemetery. He was succeeded as Chief Rabbi of Cernăuți by Abraham Jakob Mark.

== See also ==
- History of the Jews in Bukovina
- History of the Jews in Chernivtsi
- History of the Jews in Romania
