= Yella =

Yella may refer to:

- Yella (film), a 2007 German film directed by Christian Petzold, with Nina Hoss as the title character
- DJ Yella or Antoine Carraby (born 1967), an American DJ, music producer, and film director
- Yella Beezy (born 1991), American rapper
- Yella Hertzka (1873–1948), Austrian activist
- Yella Pessl (1906–1991), Austrian-born American harpsichordist
- Yella Rottländer (born 1964), German actress and designer
- Yella Venkateswara Rao (born 1947), Indian musician

== See also ==
- Yela (disambiguation)
- Yeller (disambiguation)
