= Vítkov =

- Town
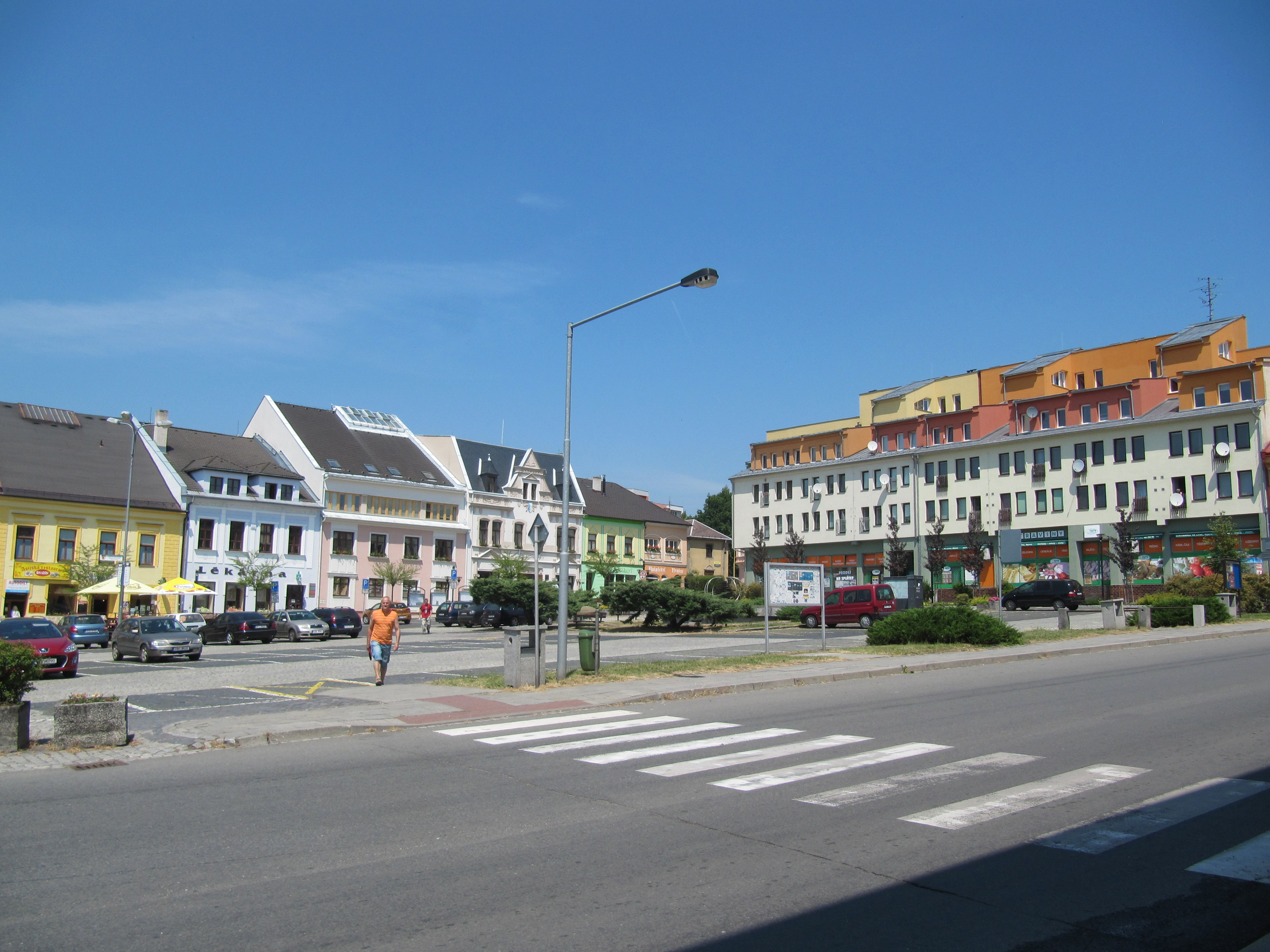
- Town square

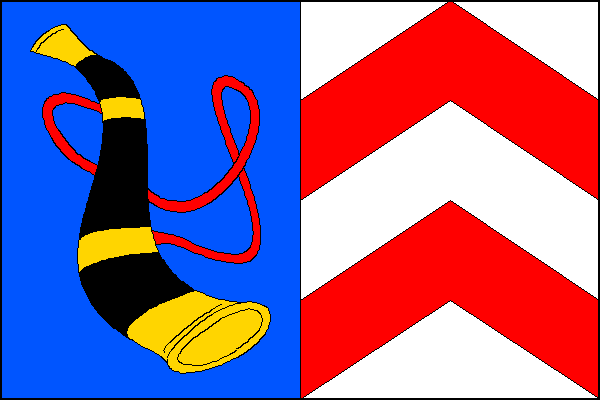
- Flag Coat of arms

- Location in the Czech Republic
- Coordinates: 49°46′28″N 17°44′58″E
- Country: Czech Republic
- Region: Moravian-Silesian
- District: Opava
- First mentioned: 1301

Government
  - Mayor: Jakub Cihlář

Area
  - Total: 55.06 km^{2} (21.26 sq mi)
- Elevation: 480 m (1,570 ft)

Population (2026-01-01)
  - Total: 5,430
  - Density: 98.6/km^{2} (255/sq mi)
- Time zone: UTC+1 (CET)
  - Summer (DST): UTC+2 (CEST)
- Postal codes: 747 47, 747 84, 749 01
- Website: www.vitkov.info

Vítkov (Czech pronunciation: [ˈviːtkof]; German: Wigstadtl, Polish: Witków) is a town in Opava District in the Moravian-Silesian Region of the Czech Republic. It has about 5,400 inhabitants. The town is located on the Čermná Stream in the Nízký Jeseník range.

Vítkov was founded in the second half of the 13th century. The most important monument is the Church of the Assumption of the Virgin Mary.

== Administrative division ==
Vítkov consists of eight municipal parts (in brackets population according to the 2021 census):

- Vítkov (4,464)
- Jelenice (97)
- Klokočov (450)
- Lhotka (75)
- Nové Těchanovice (67)
- Podhradí (67)
- Prostřední Dvůr (109)
- Zálužné (56)

Jelenice forms an exclave of the municipal territory.

== Etymology ==
Vítkov was named after its founder, nobleman Vítek of Kravaře.

== Geography ==
Vítkov is located about 20 kilometres (12 mi) southwest of Opava and 33 km (21 mi) west of Ostrava. It lies in the Nízký Jeseník range. The highest point is the hill Horka with an altitude of 603 m (1,978 ft). The Čermná Stream flows through the town. The Moravice River forms the northern municipal border and the Oder River forms the southern municipal border.

== History ==
The first written mention of Vítkov is from 1301. The town and the Vikštejn Castle were founded by Vítek of Kravaře in the second half of the 13th century. In the following centuries, the town often changed owners, who were among the lesser nobles. In 1713–1714, Wipplar of Ulschitz, the then owner of the Vítkov estate, had built here a Baroque mansion. The Vikštejn Castle (located outside today's municipal territory of Vítkov) was abandoned in 1776 and became a ruin.

The inhabitants subsisted mainly on cloth and linen crafts and agriculture. During the industrialisation in the second half of the 19th century, several textile factories were established. Gloves, ribbons and silk products were made here.

According to the Austro-Hungarian census of 1910, the town had 3,570 inhabitants, almost all of them were German-speaking Roman Catholics.

After the end of World War I, by 24 November 1918, the town became part of the Czechoslovak Republic.

In 1938, Vítkov was annexed by Nazi Germany and administered as part of the Reichsgau Sudetenland. After World War II, the German-speaking population was expelled and the town was resettled by Czechs.

The 2009 Vítkov arson attack happened in Vítkov, when three molotov cocktails were thrown on a house inhabited by a Roma family.

== Demographics ==
Historical population

Year	Pop.	±%
1869	6,110	—
1880	6,588	+7.8%
1890	7,209	+9.4%
1900	7,540	+4.6%
1910	7,633	+1.2%

Year	Pop.	±%
1921	6,539	−14.3%
1930	6,795	+3.9%
1950	4,575	−32.7%
1961	5,474	+19.7%
1970	5,663	+3.5%

Year	Pop.	±%
1980	6,483	+14.5%
1991	6,376	−1.7%
2001	6,337	−0.6%
2011	5,821	−8.1%
2021	5,385	−7.5%

Source: Censuses

== Transport ==
Vítkov is located on the Suchdol nad Odrou–Budišov nad Budišovkou railway line of local importance.

== Sights ==
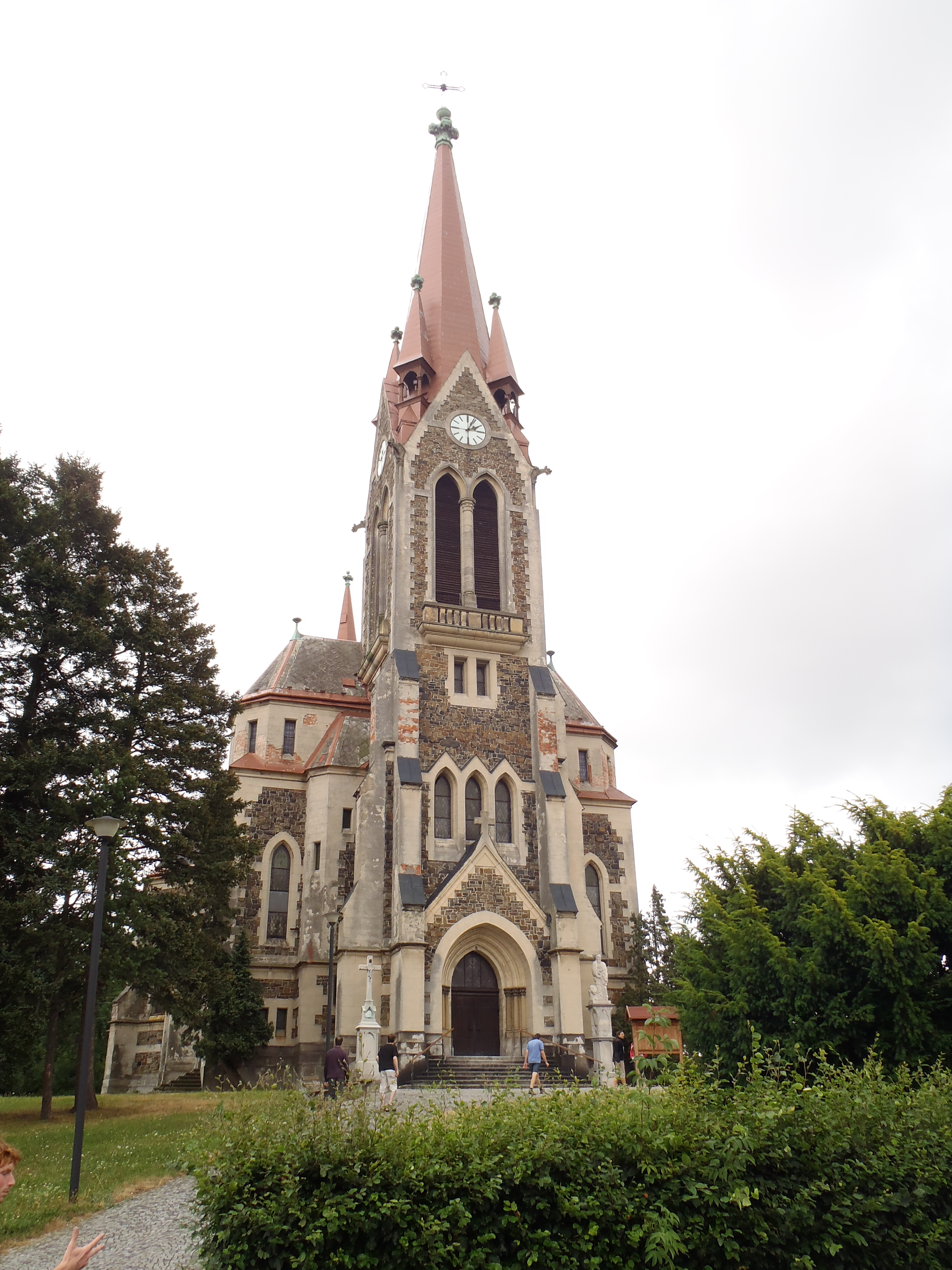
Church of the Assumption of the Virgin Mary

The main landmark of the town is the Church of the Assumption of the Virgin Mary. This parish church was built in the neo-Gothic style in 1914–1918.

== Notable people ==
- Ferdinand Hanusch (1866–1923), Austrian politician
- Franz W. Seidler (born 1933), German historian
- Helmut Kohlenberger (born 1942), German philosopher
- Jan Zajíc (1950–1969), student who committed suicide by self-immolation as a political protest
- Martin Čížek (born 1974), footballer
- Lukáš Milo (born 1983), athlete
- Radek Faksa (born 1994), ice hockey player

== Twin towns – sister cities ==
Vítkov is twinned with:

- Kalety, Poland
- Vrbové, Slovakia
