= New Philosophers =

French philosophers

The New Philosophers (French: nouveaux philosophes) is the generation of French philosophers who are united by their respective breaks from Marxism in the early 1970s. They also criticized the highly influential thinker Jean-Paul Sartre and the concept of post-structuralism, as well as the philosophy of Friedrich Nietzsche and Martin Heidegger.

They include Alain Finkielkraut, André Glucksmann, Pascal Bruckner, Bernard-Henri Lévy, Jean-Marie Benoist, Christian Jambet, Guy Lardreau, Claude Gandelman, Jean-Paul Dollé and Gilles Susong.

== Beginnings ==
The term was created by Bernard-Henri Lévy in 1976. Most of the philosophers he included in that description had a previous history of Marxism with which they had recently broken. Several had been members of the Maoist party Gauche prolétarienne. Aleksandr Solzhenitsyn's writings on The Gulag Archipelago had a profound effect upon many of these former Marxists. Besides the content of the book, French Communist Party’s attack on the book further incited discontent with Marxism. International events, such as massacre in Cambodia and Vietnamese refugee crisis, also inspired criticism and reflections regarding communism.

== Basic characteristics ==
The New Philosophers rejected what they saw as the power-worship of the Left, a tradition which they traced back to at least Hegel and Karl Marx in the 1700s and 1800s. They argued that these and other various "master thinkers" who sought to create comprehensive systems of thought had actually created the foundations for systems of oppression. More recently Pascal Bruckner has targeted multiculturalism.

== Heterogeneity ==
Because they are defined by a negative quality (i.e., the rejection of systems of authoritarian power) the New Philosophers are very disparate. In 1978, Michael Ryan argued that they exist in name only; their "homogeneity derives from their espousal of heterogeneity." They have been described as "a brand name" for an "extremely heterogeneous group of about ten intellectuals who are held together more from without than from within... they do not serve as representatives of any clearly defined political movement or force."

== Criticism ==
They were attacked as superficial and ideological by critics such as Gilles Deleuze, Pierre Vidal-Naquet, Pierre Bourdieu, Alain Badiou, Jean-François Lyotard, and Cornelius Castoriadis.

== See also ==
- Anti-Stalinist left
- Liberalism and radicalism in France
- Neoconservatism
- Neoliberalism
- New York Intellectuals
