= Jela Špitková =

Slovak-Austrian violinist (born 1947)

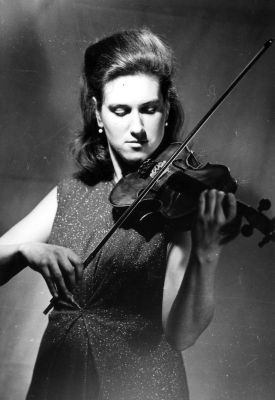
Jela Špitková

Jela Špitková (born 1 January 1947) is a Slovak-Austrian violinist. Spitková is an international concert performer, a role she combines with that of teacher at Vienna Music University, the Banská Bystrica Fine Arts Faculty, “Akademia Umeni Banská Bystrica" and the Academy of Music in Prague. She has recorded more than 900 minutes of music including 30 violin concertos and has global appeal.

== Biography ==
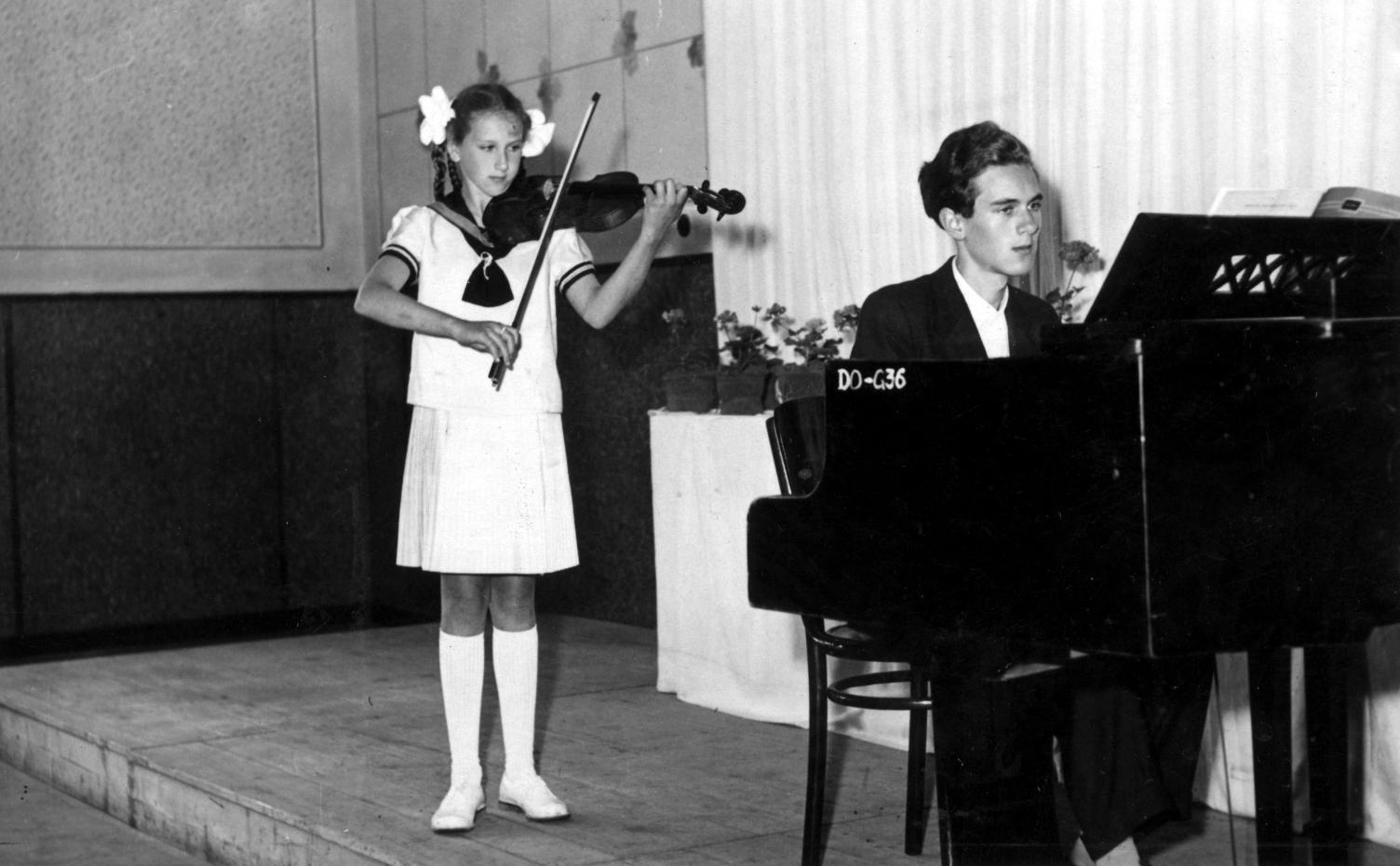
Jela Špitková accompanied by her brother Igor

Špitková was born on 1 January 1947 in Nové Mesto nad Váhom, Czechoslovakia. At the age of six, Špitková started her studies at her local music school. She studied at Bratislava Conservatory under Albín Vrtel. During this period she performed as a CSSR cultural ambassador, along with fellow ambassadors Edita Gruberová and Marián Lapšanský, in Germany, Great Britain, Italy, Poland, the Netherlands and Switzerland. After five years of study, Špitková toured Great Britain with the Slovak Philharmonic and the Brahms Violin Ensemble. One year later she became concertmaster of the European Union Youth Orchestra under Yehudi Menuhin.

== Studies ==
=== Prague and Vienna ===
On 19 April 1968, Špitková performed the Tchaikovsky Violin Concerto with Conservatory orchestra. In the summer of 1968 she took part at international competitions in Sofia and Sion ("The Tibor Varga Competition"). In 1968 Špitková stayed in Vienna, where she met Ricardo Odnoposoff. He admitted her to his violin class at the Vienna Music University. She finished her studies under Odnoposoff in 1970 and contracted with the "Slovkoncert" concert agency. Besides her studies in Vienna and her concerts, Špitková studied in Prague (1968–1972) at the music academy and finished her studies. She studied under Alexander Plocek. Her graduation concert was with the Symphony Orchestra of Prague and the Brahms violin ensemble.

=== Moscow ===
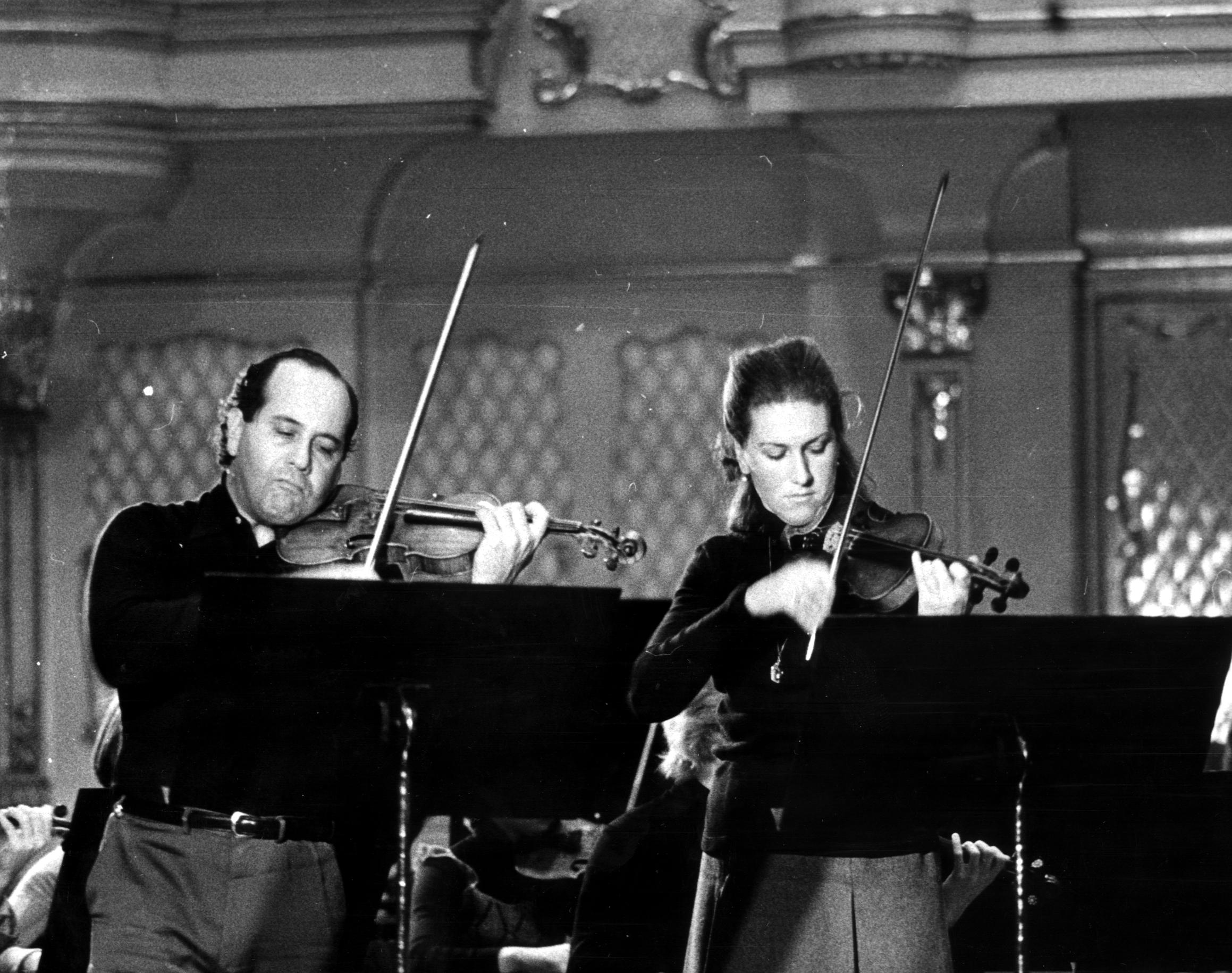
J.Špitková with Igor Oistrach – concert at BHS in 1978

In September 1971 Špitková continued her studies under Igor Oistrach at Tchaikovsky Conservatory in Moscow. At this time Špitková was playing in about 120 concerts per year. In 1978 she performed the Bach double concerto with Oistrach. She finished her studies in 1976.

== Concerts ==
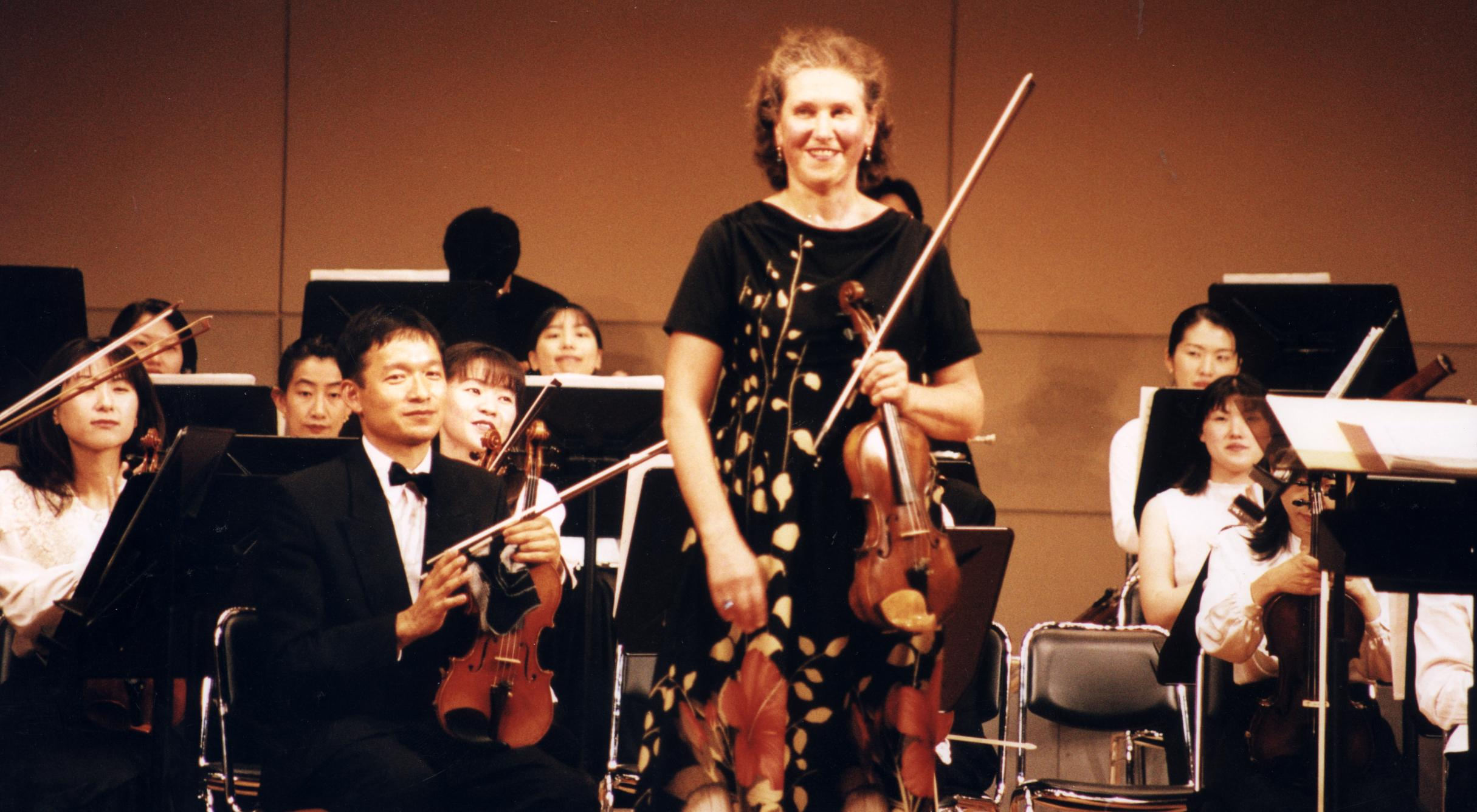
Špitková in Japan

After her studies, Špitková founded the Suchoň Quartet and the Slovak Trio, gave televised concerts, and made many recordings. She performed with the Bratislava Women's Chamber Orchestra. From 1975 until 1980 Špitková gave more than 800 concerts in 60 countries. In 1979 she was appointed concertmaster of the Radio symphony orchestra of Copenhagen. Špitková then became tutti of the Mozarteum Orchestra and was also concertmaster of the Gärtnerplatz - Theater Orchestra in Munich. She produced many recordings and also performed as a soloist. Špitková was concertmaster of the Vienna Bach Soloists and the Orchestra Sinfonica Brasileira.

== Teaching ==
From 1975, Špitková taught as an assistant at the Music Academy of Bratislava. From 1980 she was the assistant of Sándor Vegh at the Mozarteum Salzburg. From 1985 until 2012 Špitková taught at the University of music in Vienna and worked there as a university professor. In 1998 she became a professor at the state academy of music in Banská Bystrica and since 2006 professor at the academy of music in Prague. Her students play as soloists, or are members of orchestras such as the Vienna Philharmonic, the Metropolitan Opera Orchestra New York and the Miami Philharmonic...

== Prizes ==
- 1965: 1st prize at the violin competition Čs. Radio in Bratislava
- 1968: 4th prize at the International Tibor Varga–competition in Sion (CH)
- 1969: prize at the Emily Anderson competition in London
- 1971: 1st prize at the violin competition Ludwig van Beethoven in Prague.

Špitková took part at the Marguerite Long-Jacques Thibault competition in Paris (1969), the J.S.Bach violin competition in Leipzig (1968,1970), The George Enescu competition in Bucharest, a competition for young musicians in Sofia (1968), The Carl Flesch violin competition in London (1972) and the ARD - Violinwetbewerb in München (1972).

== Family life ==
Her mother was Olga Špitková, née Bogyayová, graduate of the Faculty of Economics in Bratislava. She worked at a bank. She concentrated on oil painting. Her father was Pavel Špitka, a lawyer. He played the organ and piano and was a luteran church organist for about 40 years. Her brother was Igor Špitka, a violinist of the Slovak Philharmonic.
