= Jela Spiridonović-Savić =

Serbian poet (1890–1974)

- Born: January 11, 1890; Šabac, Kingdom of Serbia
- Died: 1974 (aged 83–84); Belgrade, Yugoslavia
- Known for: Writing poetry and essays
- Spouse: Vladislav Savić

Jela Spiridonović-Savić (11 January 1890 — September 1974) was a Serbian poet.

== Biography ==
Jelena "Jela" Spiridonović-Savić was born in Šabac, Kingdom of Serbia, where she lived until graduating from the gymnasium. She spent three years in Trieste before World War I studying at the parochial school of Nostra Signora della Provvidenza e di Sion (Notre Dame de Sion Parish School). In 1913, she married Vladislav Savić, a prominent publicist, diplomat and Consul general of Yugoslavia in New York City.

Educated in the world's centers of culture, New York, Munich, Trieste, and Monaco, she had the opportunity to intersect the Orthodox theology as part of her traditional heritage with ideas of Western Christianity, especially in the area of mystical spirituality. Having researched the mosaic of Christian spirituality, Spiridonović opened the questions about the metaphysical aspects of the world, as well as practical activities of the woman according to religious principles. Religious mysticism is deeply incorporated into the spiritual essence of her poetry, prose and essays. Her essays are based on the postulates of the scientific literature on feminist theory, which raises questions, rediscovering marginalized writers and offering new interpretations of their works. She died in Belgrade, Yugoslavia, September 1974.

== Works ==
Spiridonović-Savić wrote poetry, essays, and short prose. Her publications include:

- Čežnje: izabrana dela (Čežnje: Collected works; 2012)
- Susreti (1944)
- Pripovetke (1939)
- Jesenje melodije (1939)
- Večite čežnje (1926)
- Pergamenti (1923)
- Sa uskih staza (1919)

== Sources ==
- Jela Spiridonović-Savić, Večite čežnje, 1926
- Jela Spiridonović-Savić, Pergamene rinvenute e trascritte dal fratello in cristo Stratonico, 1927
- Francesco Babudri Intimi conflitti dello spirito umano nel poemetto di Jela Spiridonović-Savić
- Umberto Urbanaz-Urbani Jela Spiridonović-Savić e le sue liriche
