= Appalled Economists =

- Économistes atterrés
- Formation: February 22, 2011; 15 years ago
- Founded at: France
- Purpose: To "stimulate the collective reflection and public expression" of proposals by economists "who are not resigned to the domination of neo-liberal orthodoxy"
- Methods: lobbying; media appearances; conferences, seminars; reports; studies
- Fields: Economics; academic education; politics

The Appalled Economists (in French: Économistes atterrés (Note: The French term atterré translates as "appalled", "shocked", "dismayed")) is an association created by economists who "resist the neoliberal orthodoxy" in order to "publicly promote" their "collective works and proposals."

== Establishment ==
On 24 September 2010, economists Philippe Askenazy of the CNRS; Thomas Coutrot of ATTAC; André Orléan, president of the French Association for Political Economy; and Henri Sterdyniak of the Observatoire Français des Conjonctures Économiques signed a common manifesto that aimed to "denounce and refute" the so-called dominant orthodoxy in economic policy across Europe. Following the popular reception of the manifesto and various public interventions by its signatories, the Appalled Economists were formed in 2011.

== Views ==
Since its creation, the association has criticized French governments of not challenging the "German-shaped, established European order" in economics.

In their publications, the association stands in opposition to what they call the "neoliberal doxa". They reject "globalization in the service of finance", criticize a "Europe where employment and social protection have become factors of adjustment to the insensitive profit motive of shareholders," and denounce the "instrumentalization of public debt" as well as the policies of a "fiscal counterrevolution" that ostensibly serves only society's "richest".

They propose a drastic reduction in tax loopholes, the creation of new income tax brackets, and the introduction of a European fiscal snake (i.e. to have variable and fluctuating VAT levels within a certain range). The crisis in Europe, according to the association, is "systemic." They suggest that the problem should not be viewed as that of a "winning" Germany opposed to southern countries which are in default. The association's economists suggest that both Eurozone's north and south of the eurozone should take steps: the north towards increasing domestic demand and the south against tax evasion and corruption.

== Criticism ==
The positions adopted by the Appalled have come under attack from many quarters. Labor market economists Pierre Cahuc and fr:André Zylberberg accuse them of denying the consensus in economics, a discipline that should be treated, according to them, as a science like biology or physics.

== See also ==
- Heterodox economics
- Eurozone crisis
- Frédéric Lordon
