= Nové Mesto nad Váhom =

Town in Trenčín Region, Slovakia

- Municipality
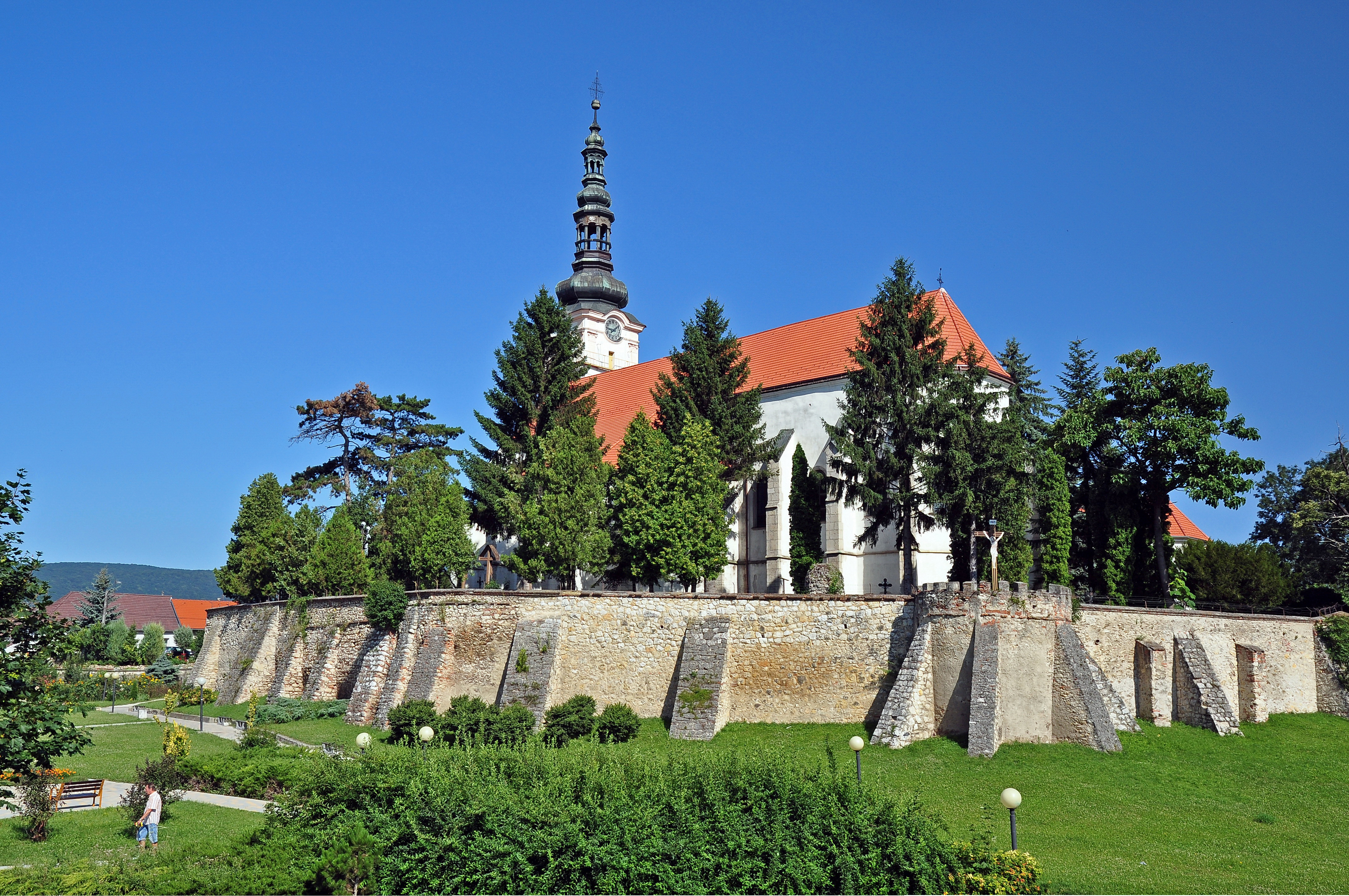
- Church of the Nativity of the Virgin Mary

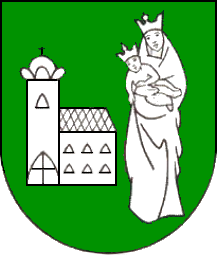
- Flag Coat of arms

- Location of Nové Mesto nad Váhom in the Trenčín Region Location of Nové Mesto nad Váhom in Slovakia
- Coordinates: 48.75°N 17.83°E
- Country: Slovakia
- Region: Trenčín Region
- District: Nové Mesto nad Váhom District
- First mentioned: 1253

Government
  - Mayor: Jozef Trstenský

Area
  - Total: 32.58 km^{2} (12.58 sq mi)
- Elevation: 189 m (620 ft)

Population (2025)
  - Total: 19,171
- Time zone: UTC+1 (CET)
  - Summer (DST): UTC+2 (CEST)
- Postal code: 915 01
- Area code: +421 32
- Vehicle registration plate (until 2022): NM
- Website: www.nove-mesto.sk

Nové Mesto nad Váhom (Slovak pronunciation: [ˈnɔʋeː mestɔ ˈnad ʋaːɦɔm]; German: Neustadt an der Waag, Neustadtl, Waag-Neustadtl, Waagneustadtl, Waag-Neustadt; Hungarian: Vágújhely, Vág-Újhely) is a town in the Trenčín Region of Slovakia.

== Geography ==
The municipality lies at an altitude of 189 metres (620 ft) and covers an area of 32.58 km^{2} (12.58 sq mi) (2025).

District town located at the northern edge of the Danubian Hills at the foothills of the northern end of the White Carpathians, on the Váh river. Other mountains nearby are the White Carpathian and the Považský Inovec. It is situated 27 km from Trenčín and 100 km from Bratislava and has an area of 32.58 km^{2}. The Town parts are: Mnešice, Izbice, Javorinaská, Hájovky, Samoty, Luka, Centrum, Rajková (northern city), Záhumenice.

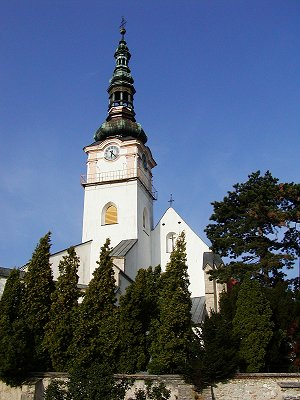
Church of the Nativity of the Blessed Virgin Mary

== Population ==
Historical population
Year	Pop.	±%
1970	15,002	—
1980	18,170	+21.1%
1991	20,956	+15.3%
2001	21,327	+1.8%
2011	20,415	−4.3%
2021	19,644	−3.8%
Source: Censuses

Population statistic (10 years)
Year	1995	2005	2015	2025
Count	21,629	20,735	20,084	19,171
Difference		−4.13%	−3.13%	−4.54%

Population statistic
Year	2024	2025
Count	19,257	19,171
Difference		−0.44%

It has a population of 19,171 people (31 December 2025).

=== Ethnicity ===
Census 2021 (1+ %)
Ethnicity	Number	Fraction
Slovak	18,133	92.3%
Not found out	1156	5.88%
Czech	363	1.84%
Total	19,644	

In year 2021 was 19,644 people by ethnicity 18,133 as Slovak, 1156 as Not found out, 363 as Czech, 87 as Romani, 83 as Other, 40 as Hungarian, 34 as Russian, 27 as Bulgarian, 25 as German, 21 as Romanian, 20 as Ukrainian, 17 as Rusyn, 13 as Polish, 13 as Moravian, 11 as Vietnamese, 11 as Italian, 11 as Croatian, 10 as Chinese, 9 as Serbian, 9 as French, 4 as Jewish, 4 as Canadian, 4 as Iranian, 2 as Greek, 2 as English and 1 as Albanian.

Note on population: The difference values of population numbers in the table "Population statistic" and in the sections "Ethnicity" & "Religion" is caused by the use of various statistical methods.

=== Religion ===
Census 2021 (1+ %)
Religion	Number	Fraction
Roman Catholic Church	8433	42.93%
None	7061	35.94%
Evangelical Church	2103	10.71%
Not found out	1474	7.5%
Total	19,644	

In year 2021 was 19,644 people by religion 8433 from Roman Catholic Church, 7061 from None, 2103 from Evangelical Church, 1474 from Not found out, 96 from Greek Catholic Church, 78 from Apostolic Church, 74 from Ad hoc movements, 62 from Other, 48 from Jehovah's Witnesses, 41 from Christian Congregations in Slovakia, 30 from Other and not ascertained christian church, 29 from Buddhism, 27 from Eastern Orthodox Church, 21 from Paganism and natural spirituality, 13 from Calvinist Church, 12 from Islam, 11 from Seventh-day Adventist Church, 10 from Church of the Brethren, 7 from United Methodist Church, 5 from Old Catholic Church, 3 from Czechoslovak Hussite Church, 2 from Jewish community, 2 from Bahá'i Community, 1 from New Apostolic Church and 1 from Hinduism.

== Places of interest ==
- Zelená voda Lakes 1 km - watersports, windsurfing, fishing, sports centre, camping area, disco and music festival place
- Čachtice Castle 6 km - home of Elizabeth Báthory
- Beckov Castle 5 km
- Tematin Castle 12 km
- the most famous Slovak Spa town Piešťany 18 km
- Trenčín 22 km
- Veľká Javorina Mountain (SK-CZ border) 15 km
- Ski Resort Kálnica 7 km
- Ducové - the Great Moravian Empire settlement 16 km
- Romanesque church in Haluzice 12 km

== History ==
Lands in the place of today's Nové Mesto nad Váhom were inhabited in the prehistoric ages, as many artefacts from the Stone and Bronze Ages were discovered. In the local part Mnešice a prehistoric settlement was discovered.

The first written record about Nové Mesto nad Váhom was in 1263, when King Béla IV of Hungary granted freedoms for the loyalty during the Mongol invasions. It belonged to the Benedictine order, later to Matthew III Csák and others. It received its town privileges in 1550. Industry developed in the 19th century and was mainly focused at processing agricultural products.

Before the establishment of independent Czechoslovakia in 1918, Nové Mesto nad Váhom was part of Nyitra County within the Kingdom of Hungary. From 1939 to 1945, it was part of the Slovak Republic.

== Sports ==
Slovak Bandy Association has organised rink bandy practice in Nové Mesto nad Váhom.

== Monuments ==
- Fortified Roman-Reneissance-Baroque Church of the Nativity of the Virgin Mary
- Renaissance Vicariage Palace
- Renaissance church fortification
- Renaissance-Baroque Ghillanys' Palace (17th Century)
- Renaissance Nadasdys' Palace (16th Century)
- Protestant Church (1787)
- St. Ondrej Church (1643)
- Baroque Chapel in Hurbanova St. (18th Century)
- Baroque St. Rochus Chapel (18th Century)
- Plague Memorial on the main square (1696)
- St. Florian Statue (1762)

== Transport ==
- Railway - the town lies on the most important trans-Slovak railway track Bratislava - Kosice and a local railway branch connects Nové Mesto nad Váhom with Veselí na Moravě in the Czech Republic; express trains stop at Nové Mesto nad Váhom Station. Fast trains Bratislava-Kosice route every one to two hours, regional trains to Bratislava, Žilina, Veselí na Moravě approximately ten times a day. Arriva Express Train connects the town with Prague and Nitra daily.
- Road - main motorway D1 Bratislava - Zilina, local roads to Piešťany Spa, Trenčín, Stará Turá, Strání (SK-CZ state border)
- Public transport in the town - blue local busses stop at all the stops in the town area; the town public transport bus service RED BUS line 1 (Hajovky-Centrum-Railway station/Bus station - Industrial zone/MILEX) and line 2 (Railway station/Bus station - Centrum - Mnešice)
- Buses - blue local buses "SAD" join the town with all the villages within the district; the bus station is just right at the train station about 10 mins walk from the town centre; long-haul bus services join the town with all the important towns in Slovakia and Czech Republic
- Airport - the nearest airport Piešťany Airport (PZY) no scheduled flights; scheduled flights from Bratislava M.R. Stefanik Airport (BTS) (100 km southwest, 55min. drive by motorway D1)
- Taxi service - taxi stand at railway and bus station

== Notable people ==
- Dominik Černý (born 1997), racewalker
- Stibor of Stiboricz (c. 1348–1414) and his wife the Dutchess Dobrochna
- Ede Horn (German: Eduard Horn), born Ignacz Einhorn (1825–1875), a Hungarian Jewish economist, politician
- Ernest Nagel (1901–1985), philosopher of science
- Ľudmila Podjavorinská (1872–1951) writer, lived in Nové Mesto nad Váhom since 1910
- Josef Rosenfeld (1858–1922), Austro-Hungarian and Romanian rabbi
- Jela Špitková (born 1947), violinist
- Salomon Stricker (1834–1898), Jewish pathologist

== Twin towns – sister cities ==
Nové Mesto nad Váhom is twinned with:

- Uherský Brod, Czech Republic
