= Place Publique =

Place Publique Place publique
- Founders: Raphaël Glucksmann; Claire Nouvian; Jo Spiegel; Thomas Porcher; Diana Filippova
- Founded: 2018
- Membership: 25,000
- Ideology: Social democracy European federalism
- Political position: Centre-left
- National affiliation: New Popular Front (2024–2025); NUPES (2022–2024)
- European affiliation: Party of European Socialists
- European Parliament group: Progressive Alliance of Socialists and Democrats
- Colors: Yellow; Black
- National Assembly: 2 / 577
- Senate: 2 / 348
- European Parliament: 3 / 81

Website
- place-publique.eu

Place Publique (lit. 'Public Square') is a centre-left political party in France, founded in 2018 by Raphaël Glucksmann, Claire Nouvian, Jo Spiegel, and Thomas Porcher.

The party has two co-presidents, Raphaël Glucksmann and Aurore Lalucq.

In January 2019, the movement claimed 25,000 members. PP joined the Party of European Socialists in October 2025.

== History ==
=== Creation ===
The party was officially founded on 10 August 2018. On October 29, 2018, Raphaël Glucksmann, Thomas Porcher, Jo Spiegel, Diana Filippova, and Claire Nouvian announced the creation of Place Publique, a political party aiming to bring together the pro-European French left from Europe Ecology – The Greens to the Socialist Party and Génération.s. Their position was presented as an alternative to La France Insoumise, although Thomas Porcher declared that the movement was not against Jean-Luc Mélenchon.

On 6 November 2018, Raphaël Glucksmann and several party leaders published a manifesto announcing the birth of their movement.

=== 2019 European elections ===
On 16 March 2019, Place Publique and the Socialist Party announced that they would present a joint list at the European Parliament election, with Raphaël Glucksmann as the head of the list. Thomas Porcher left the party the same day, denouncing a "list of apparatchiks". Place Publique won two seats in the election.

=== 2024 European elections ===
In the 2024 European elections, Glucksmann led the list Réveiller l'Europe, an alliance of Place publique with the historical Parti socialiste. The list obtained 13.83% of the national votes, a high score compared to the 6.19% obtained in 2019. This result made this list the third nation-wide (after those led by Bardella and Hayer), confirming the increasing prominence of Raphaël Glucksmann as a national figure, and the emergence of Place publique as a political force.

Among the 13 seats obtained by the list "Réveiller l'Europe", three were held by members of Place publique: Raphaël Glucksmann, Aurore Lalucq, and Thomas Pellerin-Carlin.

=== 2024 French legislative election ===
In the 2024 French legislative election, Place Publique formed part of the New Popular Front electoral alliance. This allowed them to gain their first MP Aurélien Rousseau, later joined by Sacha Houlié.

== Election results ==
=== European Parliament ===
Election	Leader	Votes	%	Seats	+/−	EP Group
2019 (Note: Run in a joint list with PS, PRG and ND, that won 6 seats in total.)	Raphaël Glucksmann	1,403,170	6.19 (#6)	2 / 79	New	S&D
2024 (Note: Run in a joint list with PS, that won 13 seats in total.)	Raphaël Glucksmann	3,423,822	13.83 (#3)	3 / 81	▲1	S&D
