= Jo Spiegel =

French politician (born 1951)

Joseph Spiegel, known as Jo Spiegel (born November 24, 1951, in Mulhouse), is a French politician. A member of the Socialist Party and then of Place Publique, he became known at the national level for his practice of co-constructive democracy in the town of Kingersheim (Haut-Rhin), of which he was mayor from 1989 to 2020.
