= Yela, Liberia =

Village in Nimba County, Liberia

Yela
- Location in Liberia
- Coordinates: 07°06′11″N 09°04′55″W
- Country: Liberia
- County: Nimba County
- Elevation: 869 ft (265 m)

Yela is a town in northern Liberia.

== Transport ==
It is a station on the Lamco iron ore railway.

== See also ==
- Transport in Liberia
- Railway stations in Liberia
