= Abraham Axelrad =

Jewish actor and theatre manager (1858–1925)

- Born: 1858; Iași, Principality of Moldavia
- Died: November 11, 1925 (aged 66–67); Cernăuți, Kingdom of Romania
- Known for: Director of the Yiddish theater of Czernowitz/Cernăuți
- Spouse: Rosa (Ruchel)

Abraham Axelrad (also known as Awrom Axelrod; 1858 – November 11, 1925) was a Jewish comedian, actor, and theater director. He is considered one of the most important representatives of popular Yiddish theater culture in Czernowitz.

== Biography and career ==
Axelrad was born in Iași (then in the Principality of Moldavia, now in Romania) in 1858. As a youth, he came into contact with the Jewish theater of Abraham Goldfaden. As a member of the ensemble, he followed Goldfaden's troupe to Bucharest, where he met the playwright and theater director Moses Horowitz, who recruited him as a comedian for his own ensemble.

Shortly thereafter, Axelrad settled in Czernowitz (in Austria-Hungary, now in Ukraine), joining the Deutsch-jüdisches Theater (German-Jewish Theater), which had been under the direction of Elias (or Berl) Margulies since its founding in 1877.

On August 16, 1879, Axelrad took over the post of director of the Jewish Theater of Czernowitz, a position he held until his death. He is therefore regarded as one of the most significant figures in the popular Yiddish theater culture in Czernowitz.

From 1890, he managed the Deutsch-jüdisches Theater together with his wife, Rosa (Ruchel), who also performed as an actress. Axelrad died in Czernowitz (renamed as Cernăuți after the union of Bukovina with Romania) on November 11, 1925.

== Legacy ==
He was a personal influence during the formative years of Yiddish-language poet Itzik Manger.
