= Abraham Eliezer Eliyahu Ha-Levi Igel =

Lazar Elias Igel
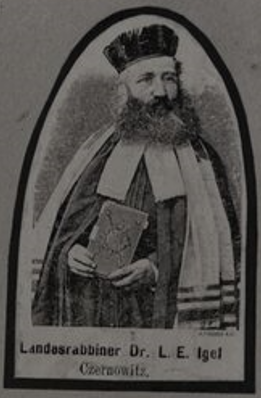

Personal life
- Born: אברהם אליעזר אליהו הלוי איגל; February 28, 1825 Lemberg, Austrian Empire
- Died: March 26, 1892 (aged 67) Czernowitz, Austria-Hungary
- Education: University of Padua; University of Lemberg
- Known for: Chief Rabbi of Czernowitz and Bukovina
- Occupation: Rabbi, educator, author

Religious life
- Religion: Judaism
- Denomination: Modern Orthodox Judaism
- Yeshiva: Collegio Rabbinico di Padova

Abraham Eliezer Eliyahu Ha-Levi Igel (Hebrew: אברהם אליעזר אליהו הלוי איגל; German: Lazar Elias Igel; Italian: Lazaro Elia Igel; 28 February 1825, Lemberg – 26 March 1892, Czernowitz) was an Austrian modern Orthodox (sometimes described as Reformist) rabbi, born in Galicia (now Ukraine). A disciple of Samuel David Luzzatto (Shadal), he served as rabbi and preacher of the “Enlightened Congregation” (Adat ha-Ne’orim, the Maskilim) and was Chief Rabbi of Czernowitz (1854–1892) and of the entire Bukovina region (1854–1878) under Austrian rule.

== Early life ==
After completing secondary studies at the Lemberg Gymnasium, at the age of 15 Igel went to study at the Collegio Rabbinico di Padova (Rabbinical College of Padua), under the supervision of scholars such as Samuel David Luzzatto, Lelio Hillel Della Torre, and Mordechai Samuel Ghirondi. At the same time, he studied philosophy and languages at the University of Padua.

== Chief Rabbi of Czernowitz ==
Rabbi Igel

In 1853, at the recommendation of Adolf Jellinek, Igel applied for the position of Chief Rabbi of Czernowitz. The city's reformist community leaders (the so-called “progressives”) were impressed by his extensive Talmudic knowledge and moral integrity and elected him Chief Rabbi of Czernowitz and of Bukovina.

However, he faced strong opposition from traditionalist Orthodox groups (the “conservatives”), who supported the candidacy of Rabbi Horowitz-Meisels. As Igel himself reported on 6 March 1854 in the Allgemeine Zeitung des Judentums, many defamatory letters were sent against him to Austrian officials and even to the Emperor.

Due to this controversy, the Austrian authorities delayed his appointment until tensions subsided. By government order, the community leaders annulled the previous vote and held new elections on 10 May 1854. This time, Dr. Igel received 147 votes in favor and 34 against, marking a decisive victory for the Maskilim in Czernowitz. In 1878, the Austrian authorities abolished the regional position of Kreisrabbiner (district rabbi).

== Activity in Czernowitz ==
Rabbi Dr. Igel was an active member of the modernist, enlightened community organized around the “Temple” Society, founded in 1857 to build a grand synagogue in Czernowitz. The synagogue, known as the Czernowitz Coral Temple, was inaugurated in 1877.

As rabbi and educator, Igel also directed the Jewish school founded in Czernowitz in 1853, which had 30 pupils, teaching Judaism four hours per week. He also established a local branch of the Alliance Israélite Universelle.

== Works ==
- Yovel shi me’achi ha-tza’ir: Teshuvot ve-she’elot (1849, Lemberg; first published in Padua, 1849)
- Mikhtavim shonim seu variae interpretationes criticae et grammaticales de Biblia veteris testamenti et de Onkelosi (Leopolis, 1850)
- Syrischer Wegweiser (“The Syrian Guide”), 1851
- German translation of Shadal's Yesodei Torah: Israelitische Moraltheologie (Breslau, 1870)

== See also ==
- History of the Jews in Chernivtsi
- History of the Jews in Bukovina
- Jewish Enlightenment
- History of the Jews in Romania
- History of the Jews in Ukraine
