= Raphaël Glucksmann =

French politician (born 1979)

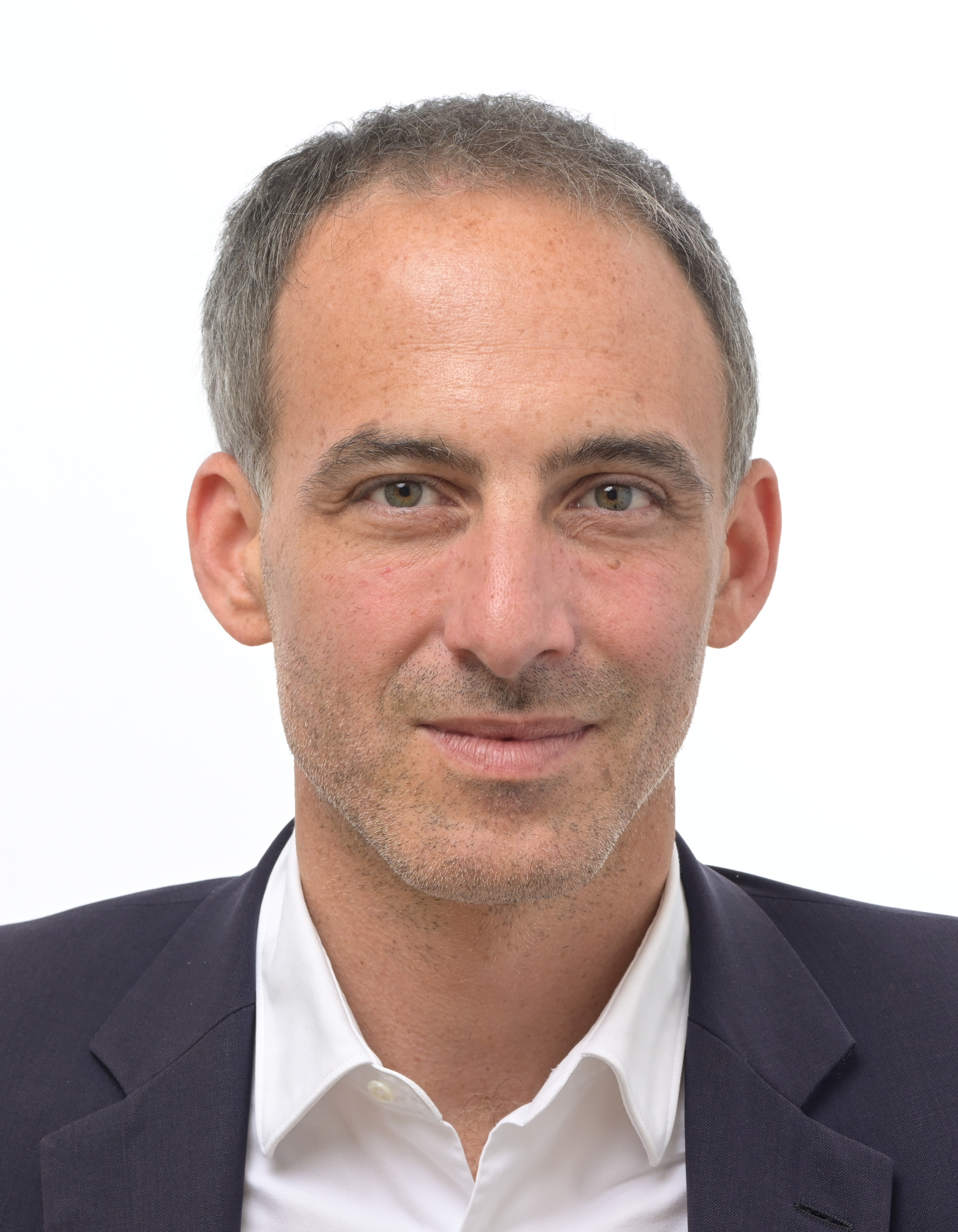
- Official portrait, 2024

Member of the European Parliament France
- Incumbent
- Assumed office 2 July 2019

Special Adviser to the President of Georgia
- In office 2009–2012
- President: Mikheil Saakashvili

Personal details
- Born: 15 October 1979 (age 47) Boulogne-Billancourt, France
- Party: PP (since 2018)
- Other political affiliations: AL (2006–2007)
- Spouse(s): Eka Zguladze (m. 2009; div. 2014) Léa Salamé (m. 2015)
- Children: 2
- Parent(s): André Glucksmann (father); Françoise Glucksmann (mother)
- Relatives: Jeannette Colombel (maternal grandmother); Rubin Glucksmann (paternal grandfather); Ghassan Salamé (father-in-law)
- Education: Sciences Po

Raphaël Glucksmann (French: [ʁafaɛl ɡlyksman]; born 15 October 1979) is a French politician. Since 2019, he has been a member of the European Parliament (MEP), within the S&D parliamentary Group, being the lead candidate for the PS-PP alliance in 2019 and 2024. He is the co-president of the political party Place Publique.

On 23 August 2026, he announced his candidacy for the 2027 French presidential election. On October 11, he won the Socialist Party primary and became the party's official candidate.

== Early life and career ==
Glucksmann was born in Boulogne-Billancourt. His mother was Françoise Glucksmann (née Villette), daughter of philosopher Jeannette Colombel. His father was the philosopher André Glucksmann, a strong advocate for human rights, particularly against the totalitarian regimes of Vietnam and the USSR. Glucksmann's paternal grandfather, Rubin Glucksmann, born in Czernowitz, Austria-Hungary (present-day Chernivtsi, Ukraine), had been a spy for the Soviet Union during the interwar period. He attended Sciences Po.

Between 2005 and 2012, Raphaël Glucksmann was an adviser to the President of Georgia, Mikheil Saakashvili.

== Political career ==
=== Beginnings ===
In 2018, Glucksmann founded the centre-left political party Place Publique.

=== Member of the European Parliament, 2019–present ===
On 26 May 2019, Place Publique and the French Socialist Party presented a joint list at the European Parliament election, with Glucksmann as the head, under the slogan, "Envie d'Europe, écologique et sociale". The list obtained a total of 6.2%, thereby securing the election of six members to the European Parliament: Glucksmann, Sylvie Guillaume, Eric Andrieu, Aurore Lalucq, Pierre Larrouturou, Nora Mebarek.

In Parliament, Glucksmann has served on the Committee on Foreign Affairs and its Subcommittee on Human Rights. Since 2020, he has also chaired the Special Committee on Foreign Interference in all Democratic Processes in the European Union.

In addition to his committee assignments, Glucksmann is a member of the Responsible Business Conduct Working Group and the Spinelli Group.

In his parliamentary work, Glucksmann has focused attention on the Xinjiang re-education camps, for which he has been sanctioned by China's Ministry of Foreign Affairs in 2021. The sanctions were lifted by China in April 2025 following negotiations with European Parliament President Roberta Metsola.

Glucksmann has led public campaigns to raise awareness and enact legislation to hold companies accountable for labour exploitation and forced labour in the fashion supply chain industry in China.

In March 2024, Glucksmann was one of 20 MEPs to be given a "Rising Star" award at The Parliament Magazine's annual MEP Awards.

=== 2024 European elections ===
In the 2024 European elections, Glucksmann led the list "Réveiller l'Europe", an alliance of his own Place Publique party and the historical Socialist Party. That list obtained 13.83% of the national votes, a high score compared to the 6.19% obtained in 2019. This result made this list the third nation-wide (after those led by Bardella and Hayer), which confirmed the increasing prominence of Raphaël Glucksmann as a national political figure.

=== Presidential campaign ===
On 23 August 2026, he announced his candidacy in the Socialist presidential primary for the 2027 French presidential election. Glucksmann won with 66.13% of the vote.

Glucksmann has, on March, 2, 2026, reproached Jean-Luc Mélenchon, leader of La France Insoumise, competitor in the 2027 Presidential race, for pronouncing his name as "Glucksman" in a speech, saying: “It is not done, to play upon names that sound either Jewish or foreign”, adding that Mélenchon played with “the worst codes of antisemitism”. Newspaper Le Monde and socialist Member of Parliament Jérôme Guedj have also condemned this word play as antisemitic. The correct pronunciation of Glucksmann's name is [glyksman], yet J.-L. Mélenchon distorted it in a public speech on 1 March, to [glyksmɒ̃], (Note: French makes a difference between the nasal sound /ɑ̃/ (typically spelled -an) – like the sound in French words like plan [plɒ̃], temps [tɒ̃] – and non-nasal vowels /an/ (often spelled -ann or -ane) – as in the French words plane [plan] or tanne [tan].) This came a few days after Mélenchon had done a similar innuendo about the name Epstein, already raising concerns about antisemitic motivations. In the aftermath, Glucksmann declared that Melenchon was "the Jean-Marie Le Pen of our era", resulting in Mélenchon's public apology.

== Political positions ==
Glucksmann describes himself as pro-Europe and pro-Ukraine. He supports state interventionism, industrial planning, limited immigration and 10-months obligatory civil service.

=== Climate change ===
In May 2021, Glucksmann joined a group of 39 mostly Green Party lawmakers from the European Parliament who in a letter urged the leaders of Germany, France and Italy not to support Arctic LNG 2, a $21 billion Russian Arctic liquefied natural gas (LNG) project, due to climate change concerns.

=== Taiwan, Uyghurs ===
In November 2021, Glucksmann led a group of seven members of the European Parliament to Taiwan to send a strong signal in support of the self-ruling island, despite a threat of retaliation from China. During this visit, the delegation stated to President Tsai Ing-wen: "Europe is standing with you." Glucksmann has been a strong proponent for deepened cooperation with Taiwan.

From 2019, Glucksmann was a persistent leader in the social media campaign to portray China's treatment of Uyghurs as a genocide; as of 2021, nearly half of the posts on his official Instagram profile concerned that issue. In 2021, Glucksmann declared that China's treatment of the Uyghurs was "the worst crime against humanity of our time". That same year, he accused German companies of acting as "ambassadors of Chinese interest". In January 2022, his persistent agitation was cited by Macron as having influenced French parliament to pass its motion in 2022 to recognize China's treatment of the Uyghurs as a 'genocide'. That same year, he declared that France's decision to send two athletes to the Beijing Olympic Winter Games was a "total shame".

=== Gaza war and related protests in France ===
In March 2024, he refused to use the term "genocide" in regards to the treatment of Palestinians by Israel during the Gaza war by claiming to be "extremely cautious about the term's usage". Glucksmann stated he would defer to the position of the International Criminal Court, which accuses Benjamin Netanyahu and Yoav Gallant of war crimes and crimes against humanity, but not genocide. He has nevertheless denounced the "carnage" in Gaza as well as the blockade. In April 2024, he said that Sciences Po Paris administration had the right to forcibly expel pro-Palestinian students from their premises during their occupation.

=== 2026 protests and riots ===
On 19 October 2026, reacting on the protests and the accompanying vandalism and looting in France on 17 October, Glucksmann first called for a firm reaction on violent groups that attack state symbols, public services and shopkeepers: "Anything that allows for a return to civil order, if it's limited and constitutional, is welcome. We need to return to a normal state," he said. But Glucksmann also stated that the legitimate demands, of high school students (lycéens) and of civilians protesting the high cost of living, must be listened to, blaming the Presidency of Emmanuel Macron for strategically remaining passive since the mobilization of the students had started. Already before 17 October, Glucksmann had issued a “rescue plan” (plan de sauvetage) for public schools, that involved raising teachers' wages, lowering the number of students per class, and renovating the school system.

== Personal life ==
Glucksmann was married to Georgian and Ukrainian politician Eka Zguladze until 2014. They had a child in 2011. He also has son, Gabriel, born 12 March 2017, with journalist Léa Salamé. Zguladze was a special adviser to President Saakashvili from 2009 to 2012 and later served as First Deputy Minister of Internal Affairs of Ukraine from 2014 to 2016.

== Publications ==
- Je vous parle de liberté, with Mikheil Saakashvili, Paris, Hachette Livre, 2008, ISBN 978-2012376489.
- Mai 68 expliqué à Nicolas Sarkozy, with André Glucksmann, 2008, ISBN 978-2207260074.
- Génération gueule de bois, Manuel de lutte contre les réacs, Allary Éditions, 2015, ISBN 978-2370730404.
- Notre France. Dire et aimer ce que nous sommes, Allary Éditions, 2016.
- Les Enfants du vide. De l'impasse individualiste au réveil citoyen, Allary Éditions, 2018, ISBN 978-2370731623.
- Lettre à la génération qui va tout changer, Allary Éditions, 2021, ISBN 9782370731418.

== Notes ==
Party political offices
Preceded by Anne Hidalgo	Socialist Party nominee for President of France; 2027	Most recent
