= Jeannette Colombel =

French philosopher

Jeannette Colombel (30 December 1919 – 12 April 2016) was a French philosopher.

== Publications ==
- 1974: Les murs de l'école, Christian Bourgois éditeur.
- 1980: Brumes de mémoire, Stock.
- 1981: Sartre ou le parti de vivre, Grasset.
- 1985: Sartre: un homme en situation, Tome I, Hachette.
- 1986: Sartre: une œuvre aux mille têtes, Tome II, Hachette.
- 1990: Les amants de l'ombre, Flammarion.
- 1994: Michel Foucault, la clarté ou la mort, Odile Jacob.
- 1997: La nostalgie de l'espérance, Stock.
- 2000: Jean-Paul Sartre, un homme en situation, LGF.
- 2000: Lettre à Mathilde sur Jean-Paul Sartre, LGF, Le Livre de poche.
- 2005: Silencieuse ritournelle en Corse, Éditions Materia Scritta.
