= Lisnard =

Lisnard is a French surname. Notable people with the surname include:

- David Lisnard (born 1969), French politician, cousin of Jean-René
- Jean-René Lisnard (born 1979), French tennis player, cousin of David
