= New Energy (France) =

New Energy Nouvelle Énergie
- Abbreviation: NE
- President: David Lisnard
- Founder: David Lisnard
- Founded: 2014; 12 years ago
- Headquarters: 69 Rue des Entrepreneurs, Paris
- Youth wing: Young Energies
- Ideology: Liberalism (French); Ordoliberalism
- Political position: Centre-right to right-wing
- Colours: Blue; Khaki

Website
- www.unenouvelleenergie.fr

New Energy (French: Nouvelle Énergie, NE) is a French political party, founded in 2014 by David Lisnard, mayor of Cannes and president of the Association of Mayors of France (AMF).

== History ==
The party started organising nationally in 2021 with the aim of playing a significant role on the right in the run-up to the 2027 French presidential election. The party then benefited from the support of the right and centre elected officials, particularly from the Republicans. Claiming to be classically liberal, New Energy proposes new initiatives on various subjects such as entrepreneurial freedom, creativity, the fight against bureaucracy, ecological growth, strengthening pensions, French culture, and "international downgrading".

New Energy elected six senators in the 2023 French Senate election. The party presented several candidates in the 2024 French legislative election, forming alliances with Les Républicains and The Centrists - Le Nouveau Centre in certain constituencies. Alexandra Martin was re-elected as MP for the Alpes-Maritimes's 8th constituency, under the Nouvelle Énergie label, with David Lisnard as substitute, after winning the election against the National Rally candidate.

The party claims to have more than 11,000 members in 2025.

On early November 2026, the party claims to have more than 100,000 members.

== Organisation ==
Chaired by David Lisnard, Nouvelle Énergie has as its secretary general Alexandra Martin, deputy for the 8th constituency of Alpes-Maritimes. Romain Marsily is the general director and is in charge of the party's working groups. Since 2024, Hervé Novelli, former Secretary of State for Trade and SMEs, has been in charge of leading the party's political project. In 2025, Quentin Hoster, former journalist for Valeurs actuelles, joined the party as deputy general director. To date, the party is represented in more than 70 departments in metropolitan France and in the overseas territories, by local representatives responsible for running their respective departments. The party's youth movement, called Les Jeunes Énergies, is represented by Marion Beaudin.

== Political positioning ==
Coming from classical liberalism and ordoliberalism, Nouvelle Énergie positions itself as a reformist right-wing party. It is attached to republican values, decentralisation and the defense of economic freedoms, while advocating rigorous management of public affairs. New Energy proposes an ambitious plan for national recovery, centred on freedom, prosperity, dignity, and national unity. Its president firmly opposes the policies pursued for more than 40 years, which he describes as "social-statism" and the "rule of technocrats" in France.

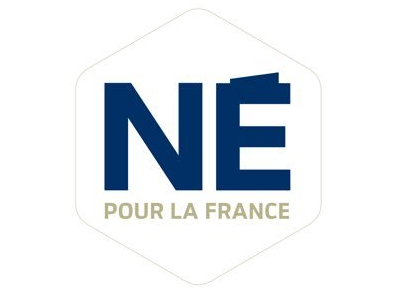
Old New Energy logo

Here is a non-exhaustive list of his proposals:

- increase net salary by reducing contributions and charges;
- create a single employment contract, merging permanent and fixed-term contracts;
- launch a major family policy to combat demographic decline;
- ensuring security by supporting the police, lowering the age of criminal responsibility to 16, and expelling foreign criminals;
- drastically reduce the bureaucratic and fiscal barriers that limit innovation, individual initiatives and entrepreneurship;
- establish a collective capitalisation pension system;
- create a single social allowance;
- end automatic family reunification, reinstate the offence of illegality and enforce OQTFs (Obligations to Leave French Territory);
- reorganise the public hospital and emergency services, and generalise palliative care;
- pursue an ambitious policy of decentralisation;
- abolish the school map, and reform teacher training and programs to reconnect with educational excellence;
- strengthen executive control;
- addressing the major challenges of our time, such as environmental protection and artificial intelligence, by stimulating investment and unleashing science, research and innovation.
