= Opinion polling for the 2027 French presidential election =

This page lists public opinion polls conducted for the 2027 French presidential election. The first round is scheduled to be held on 18 April 2027.

== First round ==
If a candidate receives an absolute majority of the votes (excluding blank and void ballots), the election ends after the first round and the second round does not occur. If a second round occurs, the two candidates who receive the most votes in the first round move on to the second round. Candidates are listed from left to right based on their party's position on the left-right spectrum; when there are several candidates from one party, then they are ordered alphabetically by their last name.

Local regression of polls conducted between the 2022 and 2027 presidential election.

Local regression of polls conducted since September 2024.

=== November 2026 ===
Polling firm	Fieldwork date	Sample size	Nathalie Arthaud	Jean-Luc Mélenchon	Fabien Roussel	Natacha Polony	François Ruffin	Karim Bouamrane	Marine Tondelier	Raphaël Glucksmann	Gabriel Attal	Teddy Riner	Christine Lagarde	Édouard Philippe	Dominique de Villepin	David Lisnard	Bruno Retailleau	Nicolas Dupont-Aignan	Marine Le Pen	Florian Philippot	François Asselineau	Éric Zemmour
	21 Nov 2026	François Ruffin withdraws from the race.																				
	20 Nov 2026	Dominique de Villepin officialize his candidacy.																				
Harris Interactive	18–19 Nov 2026	2,088	1%	18%	1%	–	–	–	1%	11%	4%	4%	–	9%	1%	11%	4%	1%	31%	–	–	4%
Harris Interactive	18–19 Nov 2026	2,088	1%	19%	1%	–	–	–	1%	11%	–	4%	–	10%	2%	11%	4%	1%	31%	–	–	4%
Harris Interactive	18–19 Nov 2026	2,088	1%	19%	1%	–	–	–	2%	11%	7%	5%	–	–	–	12%	5%	1%	30%	–	–	4%
	18 Nov 2026	Marine Tondelier announces to be open to unite around Mélenchon.																				
YouGov	12–17 Nov 2026	952	1%	19%	2%	–	–	–	4%	9%	5%	–	–	8%	–	9%	6%	2%	32%	–	–	3%
YouGov	12–17 Nov 2026	952	1%	19%	2%	–	–	–	6%	10%	7%	–	–	–	–	10%	8%	1%	34%	–	–	3%
YouGov	12–17 Nov 2026	952	1%	19%	3%	–	–	–	4%	10%	–	–	–	9%	–	10%	7%	2%	33%	–	–	3%
YouGov	12–17 Nov 2026	952	1%	22%	3%	–	–	–	–	12%	–	–	–	16%	–	–	–	2%	40%	–	–	4%
YouGov	12–17 Nov 2026	952	1%	17%	2%	–	–	–	5%	9%	4%	3%	–	7%	2%	9%	6%	2%	32%	–	–	3%
Ifop	13–16 Nov 2026	1,690	–	17%	1.5%	1%	2%	–	2%	8%	4.5%	4%	–	10%	1.5%	8%	4%	1.5%	32%	–	–	3%
Ifop	13–16 Nov 2026	1,690	0.5%	19%	2.5%	–	–	–	3%	10%	4%	–	–	11%	–	9%	4%	1.5%	34%	–	–	3%
Ifop	13–16 Nov 2026	1,690	0.5%	19.5%	2.5%	–	–	–	2.5%	10%	–	–	–	12%	–	10%	4%	1.5%	35%	–	–	3%
Ifop	13–16 Nov 2026	1,690	0.5%	19%	2%	–	–	–	2.5%	11%	9%	–	–	–	–	11%	5%	2%	35%	–	–	3%
Ifop	13–16 Nov 2026	1,690	0.5%	19.5%	2%	–	–	–	2.5%	11%	–	–	–	14%	–	12%	–	1.5%	34%	–	–	3%
Ifop	13–16 Nov 2026	1,690	0.5%	19%	2.5%	–	–	–	3%	11.5%	–	–	–	15%	–	–	7%	2%	36%	–	–	3.5%
Elabe	12–13 Nov 2026	1,391	0.5%	17%	2%	–	–	–	3%	13.5%	–	–	–	15%	2.5%	–	6%	3%	33%	–	–	4.5%
Elabe	12–13 Nov 2026	1,391	1%	17.5%	2.5%	–	–	–	3%	14%	10%	–	–	–	3%	–	9%	2.5%	33%	–	–	4.5%
Elabe	12–13 Nov 2026	1,391	0.5%	17.5%	2%	–	–	–	3.5%	13%	5.5%	–	–	12%	–	–	6%	3%	33%	–	–	4%
Elabe	12–13 Nov 2026	1,391	0.5%	17.5%	1.5%	–	3%	–	–	14%	8.5%	–	–	–	–	10.5%	6%	2.5%	32%	–	–	4%
Elabe	12–13 Nov 2026	1,391	0.5%	18.5%	2.5%	–	–	–	–	13.5%	–	–	–	13%	–	9%	4%	3%	32.5%	–	–	3.5%
Elabe	12–13 Nov 2026	1,391	0.5%	17%	1.5%	1.5%	–	–	3%	10.5%	4%	4.5%	–	9.5%	–	8%	4%	2%	31%	–	–	3%
OpinionWay	10–12 Nov 2026	964	1%	16%	2%	–	–	<1%	3%	10%	3%	4%	–	12%	–	9%	4%	2%	31%	–	–	3%
OpinionWay	10–12 Nov 2026	964	1%	16%	2%	–	–	1%	3%	10%	4%	–	–	12%	–	10%	5%	2%	32%	–	–	2%
	10 Nov 2026	Florian Philippot and Eric Zemmour officialize their candidacy.																				
OpinionWay	9–10 Nov 2026	982	1%	17%	1%	–	–	–	3%	11%	4%	–	–	11%	–	10%	4%	1%	34%	–	–	3%
OpinionWay	9–10 Nov 2026	982	1%	16%	2%	–	–	–	3%	12%	–	–	–	12%	–	11%	4%	2%	34%	–	–	3%
OpinionWay	9–10 Nov 2026	982	1%	16%	1%	–	–	–	3%	13%	10%	–	–	–	–	12%	6%	1%	34%	–	–	3%
Cluster17	9–10 Nov 2026	1,242	0.5%	19%	1.5%	3%	2%	–	1%	8%	2%	2%	8%	8%	1%	8%	5%	2%	27%	–	1%	2%
Cluster17	9–10 Nov 2026	1,242	0.5%	20%	2%	–	–	–	1.5%	11%	–	–	–	13.5%	–	10%	5%	3%	30.5%	–	–	3%
Cluster17	9–10 Nov 2026	1,242	0.5%	21%	3%	–	–	–	1.5%	10%	–	–	14%	–	–	10%	6%	2%	30.5%	–	–	3%
	9 Nov 2026	Teddy Riner announces his candidacy.																				
Harris Interactive	3–5 Nov 2026	2,101	1%	19%	1%	–	–	–	2%	11%	–	–	–	12%	2%	9%	5%	1%	34%	–	–	3%
Harris Interactive	3–5 Nov 2026	2,101	1%	19%	1%	–	–	–	2%	12%	9%	–	–	–	2%	9%	6%	1%	35%	–	–	3%
Harris Interactive	3–5 Nov 2026	2,101	1%	18%	2%	–	–	–	2%	11%	6%	–	–	11%	–	–	7%	2%	36%	–	–	4%
Harris Interactive	3–5 Nov 2026	2,101	1%	19%	2%	–	–	–	2%	12%	–	–	–	14%	–	–	8%	2%	36%	–	–	4%
Harris Interactive	3–5 Nov 2026	2,101	1%	19%	2%	–	–	–	3%	13%	10%	–	–	–	–	–	10%	2%	36%	–	–	4%
Ifop	2–4 Nov 2026	1,834	0.5%	18%	3%	–	–	–	3%	13%	–	–	–	19%	–	–	–	1.5%	37%	–	–	5%
Ifop	2–4 Nov 2026	1,834	0.5%	18%	3%	–	–	–	3.5%	17%	–	–	–	–	–	–	14%	2%	38%	–	–	4%
Ifop	2–4 Nov 2026	1,834	1%	17%	3.5%	–	–	–	3.5%	18%	–	–	–	–	–	14%	–	2%	37%	–	–	4%
Ifop	2–4 Nov 2026	1,834	1%	18%	3%	–	–	–	3%	16%	13%	–	–	–	–	–	–	3%	38%	–	–	5%

=== October 2026 ===
Polling firm	Fieldwork date	Sample size	Nathalie Arthaud	Jean-Luc Mélenchon	Fabien Roussel	François Ruffin	Marine Tondelier	Natacha Polony	Karim Bouamrane	François Hollande	Raphaël Glucksmann	Gabriel Attal	Édouard Philippe	Dominique de Villepin	David Lisnard	Bruno Retailleau	Nicolas Dupont-Aignan	Marine Le Pen	Éric Zemmour
Ifop	27–29 Oct 2026	1,928	0.5%	18%	2%	–	3%	–	–	–	10%	5%	9.5%	–	7%	4%	1.5%	35%	4.5%
Ifop	27–29 Oct 2026	1,928	0.5%	17.5%	2%	–	3%	–	–	–	13%	9%	–	–	7.5%	5%	2%	36%	4.5%
Ifop	27–29 Oct 2026	1,928	1%	17.5%	1.5%	–	3.5%	–	–	–	11.5%	–	15%	–	–	7%	2%	37%	4%
Ifop	27–29 Oct 2026	1,928	0.5%	17.5%	2%	–	3%	–	–	–	11%	–	15%	–	9%	–	2%	36%	4%
Ipsos	21–22 Oct 2026	1,500	0.5%	17%	2%	–	3.5%	–	–	–	13%	4%	13%	–	–	7.5%	1.5%	33.5%	4.5%
Ipsos	21–22 Oct 2026	1,500	0.5%	17%	2%	–	3.5%	–	–	–	14%	–	15%	–	–	8%	2%	33.5%	4.5%
Ipsos	21–22 Oct 2026	1,500	0.5%	17%	2.5%	–	3.5%	–	–	–	15.5%	9.5%	–	–	–	11.5%	2%	33.5%	4.5%
Ipsos	21–22 Oct 2026	1,500	0.5%	17%	2.5%	–	3.5%	–	–	–	13%	–	14%	–	6.5%	5.5%	1.5%	32%	4%
OpinionWay	21–22 Oct 2026	973	<0.5%	16%	1%	–	1%	–	<0.5%	–	13%	4%	12%	–	6%	6%	1%	36%	4%
Cluster17	19–22 Oct 2026	3,000	0.5%	18.5%	2%	–	2%	–	–	–	13%	–	16%	–	–	8%	3%	33%	4%
Cluster17	19–22 Oct 2026	3,000	0.5%	19.5%	2%	–	2%	–	–	–	14%	12%	–	–	–	10%	3.5%	32.5%	4%
Cluster17	19–22 Oct 2026	3,000	0.5%	19.5%	2%	–	2.5%	–	–	6.5%	–	–	17%	–	8%	7%	3%	30.5%	3.5%
Harris Interactive	19–21 Oct 2026	2,094	1%	17%	2%	–	2%	–	–	–	12%	–	15%	1%	7%	4%	1%	33%	5%
Harris Interactive	19–21 Oct 2026	2,094	1%	17%	2%	–	2%	–	–	–	14%	10%	–	2%	8%	5%	1%	33%	5%
Harris Interactive	19–21 Oct 2026	2,094	1%	17%	1%	–	2%	–	–	–	12%	5%	13%	–	–	6%	2%	35%	6%
Harris Interactive	19–21 Oct 2026	2,094	1%	17%	2%	–	2%	–	–	–	13%	–	16%	–	–	7%	2%	35%	5%
Harris Interactive	19–21 Oct 2026	2,094	1%	19%	2%	–	2%	–	–	–	13%	11%	–	–	–	9%	2%	35%	6%
Ifop	17–19 Oct 2026	1,928	0.5%	16.5%	3%	–	3%	–	–	–	13.5%	5%	12%	–	–	5%	2%	36%	3.5%
Ifop	17–19 Oct 2026	1,928	0.5%	16.5%	2.5%	–	3%	–	–	–	14%	–	15%	–	–	7.5%	1.5%	36%	3.5%
Ifop	17–19 Oct 2026	1,928	0.5%	16%	2%	–	3%	–	–	–	16%	13%	–	–	–	7%	1.5%	38%	3%
Ifop	17–19 Oct 2026	1,928	0.5%	18%	–	–	–	–	–	–	16%	–	16%	–	–	6.5%	2.5%	37%	3.5%
Ifop	17–19 Oct 2026	1,928	0.5%	20%	–	–	–	–	–	10%	–	6.5%	14%	–	–	6%	2%	38%	3%
Ifop	17–19 Oct 2026	1,928	0%	15%	2%	1.5%	2.5%	–	–	–	12%	4%	12%	1.5%	5.5%	5.5%	1.5%	34%	3%
Ifop	17–19 Oct 2026	1,928	0.5%	15.5%	2%	–	3%	–	–	–	13%	5%	13%	–	7%	–	2%	36%	3%
Ifop	17–19 Oct 2026	1,928	0.5%	15%	2%	2%	3%	1%	–	–	12%	6%	12%	–	–	6%	2%	35%	3.5%
	17 Oct 2026	17 October riots																	
Elabe	14–16 Oct 2026	1,701	1%	15%	1.5%	–	3%	–	–	–	15.5%	–	16.5%	2%	–	7%	2.5%	32.5%	3.5%
Elabe	14–16 Oct 2026	1,701	1%	16%	2%	–	2.5%	–	–	–	16.5%	10.5%	–	3%	–	9.5%	2%	33.5%	3.5%
Elabe	14–16 Oct 2026	1,701	0.5%	15.5%	1.5%	–	2.5%	–	–	–	15%	–	15.5%	–	5.5%	6.5%	3%	31.5%	3%
Elabe	14–16 Oct 2026	1,701	1%	16%	1.5%	3%	–	–	–	–	16.5%	9.5%	–	–	6.5%	9%	2.5%	31%	3.5%
Elabe	14–16 Oct 2026	1,701	1.5%	15.5%	1.5%	–	2.5%	–	–	–	15.5%	4.5%	13.5%	–	–	7.5%	3%	32.5%	3.5%
Elabe	14–16 Oct 2026	1,701	1%	15%	1%	–	2.5%	1.5%	–	–	16%	–	16.5%	–	–	7.5%	2.5%	33.5%	3%
Cluster17	14–15 Oct 2026	1,263	0.5%	18%	1.5%	–	2%	–	–	–	11%	–	17%	–	7%	7%	2%	31%	3%
Cluster17	14–15 Oct 2026	1,263	0.5%	20%	2%	–	2%	–	–	–	12%	–	20%	–	–	–	3%	35.5%	5%
Cluster17	14–15 Oct 2026	1,263	1%	20%	2%	–	2%	–	–	–	16%	–	–	–	–	17.5%	3%	34.5%	4%
Cluster17	14–15 Oct 2026	1,263	1%	20.5%	2%	–	2%	–	–	–	16%	–	–	–	17%	–	2%	35.5%	4%
Cluster17	14–15 Oct 2026	1,263	1%	20%	2%	–	2%	–	–	–	13.5%	17%	–	–	–	–	3.5%	35.5%	5.5%
YouGov	12–15 Oct 2026	1,094	0%	15%	3%	–	6%	–	–	–	12%	6%	10%	–	–	6%	3%	36%	3%
YouGov	12–15 Oct 2026	1,094	0%	15%	3%	–	6%	–	–	–	14%	10%	–	–	–	9%	3%	37%	4%
YouGov	12–15 Oct 2026	1,094	0%	15%	3%	–	6%	–	–	–	13%	–	13%	–	–	7%	3%	36%	3%
YouGov	12–15 Oct 2026	1,094	1%	16%	3%	–	6%	–	–	9%	–	–	15%	–	–	7%	3%	37%	4%
YouGov	12–15 Oct 2026	1,094	0%	13%	2%	2%	5%	–	–	–	12%	6%	8%	1%	4%	5%	2%	35%	4%
OpinionWay	13–14 Oct 2026	1,043	1%	15%	1%	–	2%	–	<0.5%	–	13%	5%	12%	–	4%	6%	1%	35%	5%
OpinionWay	13–14 Oct 2026	1,043	0.5%	14%	3%	–	3%	–	–	–	13%	7%	12%	–	–	7%	2%	35%	4%
OpinionWay	13–14 Oct 2026	1,043	1%	15%	2%	–	3%	–	–	–	16%	11%	–	–	–	9%	2%	37%	4%
OpinionWay	13–14 Oct 2026	1,043	1%	15%	2%	–	3%	–	–	–	15%	–	15%	–	–	8%	2%	35%	4%
	13 Oct 2026	Natacha Polony announces her candidacy.																	
Ifop	12–14 Oct 2026	1,525	–	16%	2%	2%	2%	–	–	–	11.5%	5%	13%	1.5%	6%	5%	1%	32%	3%
Ifop	12–14 Oct 2026	1,525	0.5%	17%	2.5%	–	2%	–	–	–	16%	13%	–	–	–	8%	2%	36%	3%
Ifop	12–14 Oct 2026	1,525	0.5%	16%	3%	–	2.5%	–	–	–	13.5%	–	18%	–	–	6.5%	2%	35%	3%
Ifop	12–14 Oct 2026	1,525	–	16%	2.5%	–	2%	–	–	–	14%	6%	14%	–	–	6.5%	2%	34%	3%
	11 Oct 2026	Glucksmann wins the Socialist Primary.																	
Harris Interactive	5–8 Oct 2026	2,004	1%	18%	2%	–	2%	–	–	–	10%	5%	13%	–	–	7%	2%	35%	5%
Harris Interactive	5–8 Oct 2026	2,004	1%	18%	2%	–	3%	–	–	–	10%	–	17%	–	–	7%	2%	36%	4%
Harris Interactive	5–8 Oct 2026	2,004	1%	18%	2%	–	3%	–	–	–	11%	12%	–	–	–	10%	2%	36%	5%
Harris Interactive	5–8 Oct 2026	2,004	1%	18%	3%	–	4%	–	–	7%	–	–	17%	–	–	8%	2%	36%	4%
Harris Interactive	5–8 Oct 2026	2,004	1%	19%	2%	–	5%	–	–	7%	–	12%	–	–	–	10%	2%	37%	5%
Odoxa	24 Sep – 7 Oct 2026	12,005	0.5%	18%	2%	–	3%	–	–	–	9.5%	–	17%	–	–	6.5%	2%	37%	4.5%
Odoxa	24 Sep – 7 Oct 2026	12,005	1%	18.5%	2%	–	3.5%	–	–	–	10.5%	11%	–	–	–	9%	2%	38%	4.5%

=== September 2026 ===
Polling firm	Fieldwork date	Sample size	Nathalie Arthaud	Jean-Luc Mélenchon	Fabien Roussel	François Ruffin	Marine Tondelier	Emmanuel Maurel	Ségolène Royal	Olivier Faure	Karim Bouamrane	Jérôme Guedj	François Hollande	Raphaël Glucksmann	Gabriel Attal	Bruno Le Maire	Édouard Philippe	Dominique de Villepin	Xavier Bertrand	David Lisnard	Bruno Retailleau	Nicolas Dupont-Aignan	Marine Le Pen	Sarah Knafo	Éric Zemmour
Ifop	25–29 Sep 2026	1.393	0.5%	15%	2.5%	–	3%	–	–	–	–	–	–	11%	8%	–	16%	–	–	–	7%	1%	32%	–	4%
Ifop	25–29 Sep 2026	1.393	0.5%	16%	2.5%	–	3%	–	–	–	–	–	–	11%	–	–	21%	–	–	–	8%	1.5%	33%	–	3.5%
Ifop	25–29 Sep 2026	1.393	1%	15%	2.5%	–	4%	–	–	–	–	–	–	13%	15%	–	–	–	–	–	10%	2%	34%	–	3.5%
Ifop	25–29 Sep 2026	1.393	1%	17%	3%	–	5.5%	–	–	4%	–	–	–	–	17%	–	–	–	–	–	11%	1%	36%	–	4.5%
Ifop	25–29 Sep 2026	1.393	1%	16%	3.5%	–	5%	–	–	3%	–	–	–	–	–	–	23%	–	–	–	8%	1.5%	35%	–	4%
Ifop	25–29 Sep 2026	1.393	0.5%	15%	3%	–	6%	–	3%	–	–	–	–	–	–	–	24%	–	–	–	8%	1.5%	35%	–	4%
Ifop	25–29 Sep 2026	1.393	1%	17%	3.5%	–	5.5%	–	–	–	–	3%	–	–	–	–	23%	–	–	–	8%	1%	35%	–	3%
Ifop	25–29 Sep 2026	1.393	1%	17%	3.5%	–	6%	1%	–	–	–	–	–	–	–	–	23%	–	–	–	9%	1.5%	35%	–	3%
Ifop	25–29 Sep 2026	1.393	0.5%	16%	2.5%	–	5%	–	–	–	–	–	8%	–	–	–	22%	–	–	–	7%	1%	34%	–	4%
Ifop	25–29 Sep 2026	1.393	0.5%	14%	2%	3%	3%	–	–	–	–	–	–	9%	7%	–	15%	2%	–	3.5%	5%	1%	31%	–	4%
Harris Interactive	22–24 Sep 2026	1,974	1%	17%	2%	–	3%	–	–	–	–	–	–	10%	5%	–	13%	–	–	–	7%	2%	35%	–	5%
Harris Interactive	22–24 Sep 2026	1,974	1%	18%	2%	–	3%	–	–	–	–	–	–	10%	–	–	16%	–	–	–	8%	2%	35%	–	5%
Harris Interactive	22–24 Sep 2026	1,974	1%	17%	2%	–	3%	–	–	–	–	–	–	11%	12%	–	–	–	–	–	10%	2%	36%	–	6%
Harris Interactive	22–24 Sep 2026	1,974	1%	18%	3%	–	4%	–	–	–	–	–	7%	–	–	–	16%	–	–	–	9%	2%	35%	–	5%
Harris Interactive	22–24 Sep 2026	1,974	1%	17%	3%	–	5%	–	–	–	–	–	8%	–	13%	–	–	–	–	–	10%	2%	36%	–	5%
YouGov	17–21 Sep 2026	1,103	1%	17%	2%	–	3%	–	–	–	–	–	–	8%	9%	–	12%	–	–	–	8%	2%	34%	–	6%
YouGov	17–21 Sep 2026	1,103	1%	17%	2%	–	3%	–	–	–	–	–	–	9%	–	3%	13%	–	–	–	8%	2%	35%	–	6%
YouGov	17–21 Sep 2026	1,103	1%	17%	3%	–	3%	–	–	–	–	–	–	9%	14%	–	–	–	–	–	10%	2%	35%	–	5%
YouGov	17–21 Sep 2026	1,103	1%	18%	3%	–	7%	–	–	–	–	–	–	–	–	–	17%	–	–	–	8%	2%	37%	–	5%
YouGov	17–21 Sep 2026	1,103	1%	16%	2%	–	4%	–	–	5%	–	–	–	–	9%	–	12%	–	–	–	8%	2%	35%	–	6%
YouGov	17–21 Sep 2026	1,103	1%	15%	1%	2%	2%	–	–	–	–	–	4%	5%	8%	–	10%	2%	1%	2%	7%	2%	33%	–	5%
	19 Sep 2026	Dupont-Aignan announces his candidacy.																							
	16 Sep 2026	Faure, Glucksmann, Guedj, Maurel and Royal are the 5 candidates of the Socialist Primary.																							
Cluster17	15–16 Sep 2026	1,943	0.5%	19%	2%	–	2.5%	–	–	–	–	–	–	12%	–	–	19%	–	–	–	7.5%	3%	31%	–	3.5%
Cluster17	15–16 Sep 2026	1,943	0.5%	20%	2.5%	–	2.5%	–	–	–	–	–	–	14%	13.5%	–	–	–	–	–	9.5%	3%	31.5%	–	3.5%
Cluster17	15–16 Sep 2026	1,943	1%	19.5%	3%	–	3%	–	–	–	–	–	7.5%	–	–	–	19.5%	–	–	5%	7.5%	4%	30%	–	–
OpinionWay	9–10 Sep 2026	1001	1%	16%	3%	–	3%	–	–	–	1%	–	7%	–	8%	–	16%	–	–	2%	7%	2%	32%	–	2%
OpinionWay	9–10 Sep 2026	1001	1%	17%	4%	–	3%	–	3%	–	1%	–	–	–	8%	–	16%	–	–	2%	7%	3%	33%	–	2%
OpinionWay	9–10 Sep 2026	1001	<1%	17%	2%	–	3%	–	–	–	<1%	–	–	9%	7%	–	15%	–	–	2%	7%	2%	34%	–	2%
Harris Interactive	8–10 Sep 2026	2,052	1%	16%	2%	–	3%	–	–	–	–	–	–	9%	8%	–	14%	–	–	–	7%	2%	33%	–	5%
Harris Interactive	8–10 Sep 2026	2,052	1%	17%	3%	–	3%	–	–	–	–	–	–	10%	–	–	17%	–	–	–	7%	3%	34%	–	5%
Harris Interactive	8–10 Sep 2026	2,052	1%	17%	2%	–	3%	–	–	–	–	–	–	12%	14%	–	–	–	–	–	9%	2%	35%	–	5%
Harris Interactive	8–10 Sep 2026	2,052	1%	17%	3%	–	4%	–	–	–	–	–	7%	–	–	–	19%	–	–	–	9%	2%	33%	–	5%
Harris Interactive	8–10 Sep 2026	2,052	1%	17%	3%	–	4%	–	–	–	–	–	7%	–	15%	–	–	–	–	–	10%	2%	36%	–	5%
OpinionWay	8–9 Sep 2026	1001	<1%	15%	2%	–	3%	–	–	–	–	–	–	9%	8%	–	15%	–	–	–	8%	2%	34%	–	4%
OpinionWay	8–9 Sep 2026	1001	1%	15%	2%	–	4%	–	–	–	–	–	–	12%	14%	–	–	–	–	–	12%	2%	33%	–	4%
OpinionWay	8–9 Sep 2026	1001	1%	15%	1%	–	3%	–	–	–	–	–	–	10%	–	–	19%	–	–	–	10%	3%	34%	–	4%
Ipsos	3–9 Sep 2026	13,060	0.5%	15.5%	2.5%	–	4%	–	–	–	–	–	–	11.5%	6%	–	14%	–	–	–	7%	2%	33%	–	4%
Ipsos	3–9 Sep 2026	13,060	0.5%	15.5%	2.5%	–	4%	–	–	–	–	–	–	12.5%	–	–	17.5%	–	–	–	8%	2%	33.5%	–	4%
Ipsos	3–9 Sep 2026	13,060	0.5%	15.5%	2.5%	–	4.5%	–	–	–	–	–	–	13.5%	13%	–	–	–	–	–	10%	2%	34%	–	4.5%
Ipsos	3–9 Sep 2026	13,060	0.5%	16.5%	3%	–	5%	–	–	4.5%	–	–	–	–	7.5%	–	16%	–	–	–	7%	2%	34%	–	4%
Ipsos	3–9 Sep 2026	13,060	0.5%	16.5%	3.5%	–	5.5%	–	–	5%	–	–	–	–	–	–	21%	–	–	–	7.5%	2%	34.5%	–	4%
Ipsos	3–9 Sep 2026	13,060	0.5%	17%	3.5%	–	5.5%	–	–	5.5%	–	–	–	–	15.5%	–	–	–	–	–	10.5%	2.5%	35%	–	4.5%
	6 Sep 2026	Roussel announces his candidacy.																							
OpinionWay	2–3 Sep 2026	1003	1%	17%	3%	–	4%	–	–	–	–	–	–	13%	13%	–	–	–	–	–	11%	–	35%	–	3%
OpinionWay	2–3 Sep 2026	1003	1%	16%	3%	–	4%	–	–	–	–	–	–	12%	–	–	20%	–	–	–	8%	–	33%	–	3%
OpinionWay	2–3 Sep 2026	1003	1%	17%	2%	–	3%	–	–	–	–	–	–	11%	7%	–	15%	–	–	–	7%	–	34%	–	3%
Ipsos	31 Aug – 2 Sep 2026	1,500	0.5%	15%	2.5%	–	3.5%	–	–	–	–	–	–	11.5%	7.5%	–	14.5%	–	–	–	6%	2%	34%	–	3%
Ipsos	31 Aug – 2 Sep 2026	1,500	0.5%	15%	2.5%	–	4%	–	–	–	–	–	–	12%	–	–	19%	–	–	–	7.5%	2%	34.5%	–	3%
Ipsos	31 Aug – 2 Sep 2026	1,500	0.5%	15%	2.5%	–	4%	–	–	–	–	–	–	14%	14%	–	–	–	–	–	9.5%	2.5%	35%	–	3%
Ipsos	31 Aug – 2 Sep 2026	1,500	1%	16%	3%	–	5%	–	–	4.5%	–	–	–	–	8.5%	–	16.5%	–	–	–	6%	2%	34.5%	–	3%
Ipsos	31 Aug – 2 Sep 2026	1,500	1%	16.5%	3.5%	–	5%	–	–	4.5%	–	–	–	–	–	–	22.5%	–	–	–	7.5%	2%	34.5%	–	3%
Ipsos	31 Aug – 2 Sep 2026	1,500	1%	17%	3.5%	–	5.5%	–	–	5.5%	–	–	–	–	15.5%	–	–	–	–	–	10%	2.5%	36%	–	3.5%
Cluster17	31 Aug – 1 Sep 2026	1,711	1%	18%	2%	–	2%	–	–	–	–	–	–	11.5%	–	–	18%	3.5%	–	–	7.5%	3%	30%	–	3.5%
Cluster17	31 Aug – 1 Sep 2026	1,711	1%	18%	2%	–	2.5%	–	–	–	–	–	–	11.5%	13.5%	–	–	4%	–	–	9%	3%	31.5%	–	4%
Cluster17	31 Aug – 1 Sep 2026	1,711	1%	17%	2%	4%	–	–	–	–	–	–	–	11%	–	–	17%	3.5%	–	4%	6.5%	2%	29%	–	3%

=== July 2026 – August 2026 ===
Polling firm	Fieldwork date	Sample size	Nathalie Arthaud	Fabien Roussel	Jean-Luc Mélenchon	François Ruffin	Olivier Faure	François Hollande	Raphaël Glucksmann	Marine Tondelier	Gabriel Attal	Édouard Philippe	Dominique de Villepin	Laurent Wauquiez	Bruno Retailleau	Nicolas Dupont-Aignan	Marine Le Pen	Éric Zemmour
	30 Aug 2026	Faure announces his candidacy and will participate in the PS primary.																
Elabe	26–28 Aug 2026	1,501	1.5%	3%	14%	–	–	–	11.5%	3.5%	–	17%	2%	–	6.5%	3%	34%	4%
Elabe	26–28 Aug 2026	1,501	1.5%	3%	14%	–	–	–	14%	3%	12%	–	2.5%	–	9.5%	2%	34.5%	4%
Elabe	26–28 Aug 2026	1,501	2%	3.5%	14%	–	–	7.5%	–	4%	–	19.5%	–	–	6%	2.5%	34%	4%
Elabe	26–28 Aug 2026	1,501	1.5%	4%	14%	6%	–	8%	–	–	12.5%	–	–	–	9%	2.5%	34.5%	4.5%
Elabe	26–28 Aug 2026	1,501	1.5%	4.5%	14.5%	–	3.5%	–	–	4%	–	20.5%	2.5%	–	7%	2.5%	35.5%	4%
Elabe	26–28 Aug 2026	1,501	1.5%	3%	14.5%	–	–	–	12.5%	4%	6.5%	14.5%	–	–	7%	2.5%	34%	4%
	27 Aug 2026	First debate of 7 candidates: Retailleau, Glucksmann, Le Pen, Philippe, Mélenchon, Tondelier and Attal.																
Ifop	24–25 Aug 2026	1.598	0.5%	3%	16%	–	–	–	11%	3%	8%	14.5%	–	–	6%	1.5%	33%	3.5%
Ifop	24–25 Aug 2026	1.598	0.5%	3%	17%	–	–	–	15%	3%	14%	–	–	–	9%	1.5%	34%	3%
Ifop	24–25 Aug 2026	1.598	1%	3%	17%	–	–	–	12%	3%	–	18%	–	–	8%	1.5%	33%	3.5%
Ifop	24–25 Aug 2026	1.598	1%	3%	17%	–	–	–	18%	3%	–	–	–	–	12%	2%	35%	3%
Ifop	24–25 Aug 2026	1.598	1%	–	18%	–	–	–	15%	–	–	19%	–	–	8%	2.5%	33%	3.5%
Ifop	24–25 Aug 2026	1.598	1.5%	–	18.5%	–	–	–	17%	–	15%	–	–	–	9%	2%	34%	3%
Ifop	24–25 Aug 2026	1.598	1.5%	–	19%	–	–	12%	–	–	–	21%	–	–	8%	2%	34%	2.5%
	23 Aug 2026	Glucksmann announces his candidacy.																
Harris Interactive	18–19 Aug 2026	1,764	1%	2%	16%	–	–	–	10%	3%	8%	14%	–	–	6%	2%	35%	3%
Harris Interactive	18–19 Aug 2026	1,764	1%	3%	17%	–	–	8%	–	4%	14%	–	–	–	9%	2%	38%	4%
Harris Interactive	18–19 Aug 2026	1,764	1%	2%	17%	–	–	–	11%	3%	15%	–	–	–	9%	2%	37%	3%
Harris Interactive	18–19 Aug 2026	1,764	1%	3%	17%	–	–	–	10%	3%	–	17%	–	–	7%	3%	35%	4%
Harris Interactive	18–19 Aug 2026	1,764	1%	3%	17%	–	–	8%	–	4%	–	19%	–	–	7%	2%	35%	4%
Cluster17	22–24 Jul 2026	1,506	1%	2%	18%	–	–	–	10%	3%	–	18%	3%	–	8%	3%	30%	4%
Cluster17	22–24 Jul 2026	1,506	1%	2%	18%	–	–	–	10%	3%	14%	–	4%	–	10%	4%	30%	4%
Elabe	9–10 Jul 2026	1,503	1%	2.5%	16%	–	–	–	10.5%	3.5%	–	16.5%	2.5%	–	8%	1.5%	35%	3%
Elabe	9–10 Jul 2026	1,503	1.5%	2.5%	14.5%	–	–	–	11.5%	3.5%	13.5%	–	3.5%	–	11%	1.5%	34%	3.5%
Elabe	9–10 Jul 2026	1,503	1.5%	2.5%	14.5%	6%	–	9%	–	–	–	19%	–	–	9%	1.5%	35%	2.5%
Elabe	9–10 Jul 2026	1,503	1.5%	2.5%	15%	6%	–	8%	–	–	15.5%	–	–	–	11%	1.5%	35.5%	3.5%
Elabe	9–10 Jul 2026	1,503	1%	2.5%	14.5%	–	–	–	8.5%	4%	7.5%	14%	–	–	8.5%	1.5%	35%	3%
Elabe	9–10 Jul 2026	1,503	2%	3%	15%	–	–	8%	–	4%	–	18%	3%	–	8%	1.5%	34.5%	3%
Verian	9–10 Jul 2026	1,047	–	2%	15%	–	–	–	11%	–	8%	17%	–	–	7%	–	37%	3%
OpinionWay	8–9 Jul 2026	963	<1%	2%	13%	–	–	–	9%	5%	7%	18%	–	–	8%	–	35%	3%
OpinionWay	8–9 Jul 2026	963	1%	2%	15%	–	–	–	9%	4%	–	22%	–	–	9%	–	34%	4%
OpinionWay	8–9 Jul 2026	963	1%	2%	15%	–	–	–	10%	5%	16%	–	–	–	12%	–	36%	3%
Harris Interactive	7–8 Jul 2026	1,582	1%	2%	16%	–	–	–	10%	2%	8%	14%	–	–	7%	1%	35%	4%
Harris Interactive	7–8 Jul 2026	1,582	1%	3%	16%	–	–	8%	–	5%	16%	–	–	–	8%	2%	36%	5%
Harris Interactive	7–8 Jul 2026	1,582	1%	3%	16%	–	–	–	11%	3%	16%	–	–	–	9%	1%	36%	4%
Harris Interactive	7–8 Jul 2026	1,582	1%	3%	16%	–	–	8%	–	4%	–	20%	–	–	8%	1%	35%	4%
Harris Interactive	7–8 Jul 2026	1,582	1%	2%	16%	–	–	–	11%	3%	–	20%	–	–	8%	2%	34%	4%
Ifop	7–8 Jul 2026	984	0.5%	2%	15%	–	–	–	12%	4%	15%	–	–	–	10%	2%	36%	3.5%
Ifop	7–8 Jul 2026	984	0.5%	3%	15%	–	–	–	9%	3.5%	–	19%	–	–	8%	2%	36%	4%
	7 Jul 2026	An appeals court rules that Le Pen can run for public office again. Le Pen announces her candidacy.																

=== January 2026 – June 2026 ===
Polling firm	Fieldwork date	Sample size	Nathalie Arthaud	Philippe Poutou	Fabien Roussel	Jean-Luc Mélenchon	François Ruffin	Olivier Faure	François Hollande	Raphaël Glucksmann	Marine Tondelier	Gabriel Attal	Édouard Philippe	Dominique de Villepin	Laurent Wauquiez	Bruno Retailleau	Nicolas Dupont-Aignan	Marine Le Pen	Sarah Knafo	Éric Zemmour
Ipsos	27–28 May 2026	1,500	1%	–	4%	13.5%	–	–	7%	–	4%	9.5%	14.5%	–	–	8.5%	1.5%	32%	4.5%	–
Ipsos	27–28 May 2026	1,500	1%	–	3%	13%	–	–	–	11%	4%	8.5%	14%	–	–	8.5%	1.5%	31%	4.5%	–
Ifop	26–28 May 2026	1,368	0.5%	–	3%	13%	–	–	–	11.5%	3.5%	16%	–	–	–	11.5%	2%	32%	4%	–
Ifop	26–28 May 2026	1,368	0.5%	–	3%	13%	–	–	–	11%	4%	–	19%	–	–	9%	1.5%	33%	4%	–
Harris Interactive	25–27 May 2026	1,744	1%	–	4%	15%	–	–	–	11%	3%	15%	–	–	–	11%	2%	32%	6%	–
Harris Interactive	25–27 May 2026	1,744	1%	–	3%	14%	–	–	–	11%	3%	–	19%	–	–	10%	2%	31%	6%	–
	22 May 2026	Gabriel Attal announces his candidacy.																		
Harris Interactive	22 Apr 2026	2,000	1%	–	4%	12%	–	–	–	12%	4%	14%	–	–	–	13%	2%	33%	5%	–
Harris Interactive	22 Apr 2026	2,000	1%	–	4%	12%	–	–	–	11%	4%	–	19%	–	–	10%	1%	32%	6%	–
Elabe	25–27 Mar 2026	1,504	1%	–	2.5%	12%	–	–	–	12.5%	4%	11.5%	–	6%	–	10%	2.5%	34%	4%	–
Elabe	25–27 Mar 2026	1,504	0.5%	–	3.5%	11.5%	–	–	8.5%	–	5%	–	22%	2.5%	–	8.5%	3%	31.5%	–	3.5%
Ifop	26–27 Feb 2026	1,393	2%	–	2%	11%	–	–	–	12%	4.5%	10%	–	4.5%	–	12%	3%	35%	4%	–
Ifop	26–27 Feb 2026	1,393	1%	–	2%	10%	–	–	–	11%	4%	–	16%	5%	–	11%	2%	34%	4%	–

=== March – December 2025 ===
Polling firm	Fieldwork date	Sample size	Nathalie Arthaud	Philippe Poutou	Fabien Roussel	Jean-Luc Mélenchon	François Ruffin	Olivier Faure	François Hollande	Raphaël Glucksmann	Marine Tondelier	Gabriel Attal	Édouard Philippe	Dominique de Villepin	Laurent Wauquiez	Bruno Retailleau	Nicolas Dupont-Aignan	Marine Le Pen	Sarah Knafo	Éric Zemmour
Elabe	30–31 Oct 2025	1,501	1.5%	–	3%	11.5%	–	–	–	12%	4.5%	12.5%	–	5%	–	8%	2.5%	34%	6.5%	–
Harris Interactive	7 Oct 2025	1,124	1%	–	3%	14%	–	–	–	12%	3%	–	16%	–	–	10%	1%	34%	–	6%
Harris Interactive	7 Oct 2025	1,124	1%	–	3%	14%	–	–	–	14%	3%	12%	–	–	–	11%	2%	34%	–	6%
Cluster17	30 Sep – 1 Oct 2025	1,534	1.5%	–	3%	15%	–	–	–	15%	–	12%	–	–	–	14%	3.5%	30.5%	–	5.5%
Ifop	24–25 Sep 2025	1,210	1%	–	3%	12%	–	–	–	15%	–	–	16%	5%	–	9%	2%	33%	–	4%
Ifop	19–20 May 2025	1,114	1%	–	3%	13.5%	–	4.5%	–	–	5%	–	21%	–	–	16%	2%	31%	–	3%
Harris Interactive	19 May 2025	1,071	1%	–	3%	14%	–	–	–	10%	3%	–	21%	–	–	12%	–	31%	–	5%
Harris Interactive	19 May 2025	1,071	1%	–	3%	15%	–	–	–	11%	3%	15%	–	–	–	16%	–	31%	–	5%
Odoxa	23–24 Apr 2025	1,005	1%	2%	3%	12%	–	–	–	11.5%	3%	–	20.5%	–	–	10%	2%	32%	–	3%
Ifop/Hexagone	11–18 Apr 2025	9,128	0.5%	–	2%	10%	5.5%	–	–	10%	–	–	21%	–	–	9%	2%	32%	–	4%
Elabe	2–4 Apr 2025	1,413	1%	2%	6%	10%	–	5.5%	–	–	5.5%	–	23.5%	–	–	8%	3%	32%	–	3.5%
Elabe	2–4 Apr 2025	1,413	0.5%	2%	5%	9.5%	–	–	–	10.5%	4%	–	24%	–	4.5%	–	3%	33.5%	–	3.5%
Elabe	2–4 Apr 2025	1,413	1%	2%	5.5%	11%	–	4%	–	–	6%	18%	–	–	–	10%	3%	36%	–	3.5%
	31 Mar 2025	Marine Le Pen is barred from running for public office for five years.																		

=== March 2023 – March 2025 ===
Polling firm	Fieldwork date	Sample size	Nathalie Arthaud (LO)	Philippe Poutou (NPA)	Fabien Roussel (PCF)	Jean-Luc Mélenchon (LFI)	François Ruffin (D!)	Bernard Cazeneuve (LC)	Carole Delga (PS)	Olivier Faure (PS)	François Hollande (PS)	Raphaël Glucksmann (PP)	Yannick Jadot (LE)	Sandrine Rousseau (LE)	Marine Tondelier (LE)	Gabriel Attal (RE)	Élisabeth Borne (RE)	Yaël Braun-Pivet (RE)	Jean Castex (IND)	Gérald Darmanin (RE)	Bruno Le Maire (RE)	François Bayrou (MD)	Édouard Philippe (HOR)	Jean Lassalle(RES)	Xavier Bertrand (NF)	Laurent Wauquiez (LR)	Michel Barnier (LR)	Bruno Retailleau (LR)	Nicolas Dupont-Aignan (DLF)	Jordan Bardella (RN)	Marine Le Pen (RN)	Éric Zemmour (R!)
Ifop	26–27 Mar 2025	1,119	1%	1%	4%	12%	–	–	–	4%	–	–	–	–	3%	–	–	–	–	–	–	–	25%	–	–	5%	–	–	4%	–	36%	5%
Ifop	26–27 Mar 2025	1,119	1%	1%	3%	13%	–	–	–	5%	–	–	–	–	3%	–	–	–	–	–	–	–	21%	–	–	–	–	11%	3%	–	34%	5%
Ifop	26–27 Mar 2025	1,119	1%	1%	4%	13%	–	–	–	5%	–	–	–	–	3%	20%	–	–	–	–	–	–	–	–	–	8%	–	–	3%	–	37%	5%
Ifop	26–27 Mar 2025	1,119	1%	1%	2%	13%	–	–	–	–	–	11%	–	–	3%	–	–	–	–	–	–	–	20%	–	–	5%	–	–	3%	–	35%	5%
Ifop	6–9 Dec 2024	1,101	1%	0.5%	3%	12%	–	–	–	5%	–	–	–	–	4.5%	20%	–	–	–	–	–	–	–	1%	–	8%	–	–	3%	–	38%	4%
Ifop	6–9 Dec 2024	1,101	1%	0.5%	3%	11%	–	–	–	–	7%	–	–	–	4%	–	–	–	–	–	–	–	24%	1.5%	–	6%	–	–	3%	–	35%	4%
Ifop	6–9 Dec 2024	1,101	0.5%	0.5%	3%	12%	–	–	–	4%	–	–	–	–	4.5%	–	–	–	–	–	–	–	25%	1%	–	6%	–	–	3.5%	–	36%	4%
Ifop	6–9 Dec 2024	1,101	1%	0.5%	3%	12%	–	–	–	4%	–	–	–	–	5%	–	–	–	–	–	–	–	26%	1.5%	–	6.5%	–	–	3.5%	34%	–	3%
OpinionWay	11–12 Sep 2024	1,009	–	–	4%	10%	–	–	–	–	–	14%	–	1%	–	–	–	–	–	–	–	–	26%	–	–	5%	–	–	–	–	35%	5%
OpinionWay	11–12 Sep 2024	1,009	1%	2%	–	15%	–	–	–	–	–	–	–	–	–	–	–	–	–	–	–	–	31%	–	7%	–	–	–	–	–	40%	4%
OpinionWay	11–12 Sep 2024	1,009	–	–	3%	10%	–	–	–	–	–	12%	–	1%	–	8%	–	–	–	–	–	–	23%	–	–	5%	–	–	–	–	34%	4%
OpinionWay	11–12 Sep 2024	1,009	1%	2%	–	14%	–	–	–	–	–	–	–	–	–	10%	–	–	–	–	–	–	25%	–	–	6%	–	–	–	–	38%	4%
OpinionWay	11–12 Sep 2024	1,009	–	–	–	4%	10%	–	–	–	–	14%	–	1%	–	–	–	–	–	–	–	–	28%	–	–	4%	–	–	–	35%	–	4%
OpinionWay	11–12 Sep 2024	1,009	–	–	4%	10%	–	–	–	–	–	14%	–	1%	–	–	–	–	–	–	–	–	27%	–	–	–	4%	–	–	–	36%	4%
Ifop	6–9 Sep 2024	1,107	1%	1%	6%	10%	–	–	–	4%	–	–	–	–	6%	24%	–	–	–	–	–	–	–	3%	–	5%	–	–	2%	–	35%	3%
Ifop	6–9 Sep 2024	1,107	1%	1%	5%	10%	–	–	–	–	8%	–	–	–	5%	22%	–	–	–	–	–	–	–	3%	–	5%	–	–	2%	–	35%	3%
Ifop	6–9 Sep 2024	1,107	1%	1.5%	6%	9%	–	–	–	4%	–	–	–	–	5%	–	–	–	–	–	–	–	27%	3%	–	4%	–	–	2%	–	34%	3.5%
Ifop	6–9 Sep 2024	1,107	0.5%	1%	6%	9.5%	–	–	–	–	7%	–	–	–	5%	–	–	–	–	–	–	–	26%	2%	–	4%	–	–	2%	–	34%	3%
Harris Interactive	7–8 Jul 2024	2,496	1%	2%	3%	15%	–	–	–	–	–	14%	-	–	3%	20%	–	–	–	–	–	–	–	–	–	5%	–	–	2%	–	31%	4%
Harris Interactive	7–8 Jul 2024	2,496	1%	1%	3%	15%	–	–	–	–	–	14%	–	–	3%	–	–	–	–	–	-	–	22%	–	–	5%	–	–	2%	–	31%	3%
Harris Interactive	7–8 Jul 2024	2,496	1%	2%	5%	16%	–	–	–	6%	–	–	–	–	4%	23%	–	–	–	–	–	–	–	–	–	5%	–	–	2%	–	32%	4%
Harris Interactive	7–8 Jul 2024	2,496	1%	2%	4%	17%	–	–	–	5%	–	–	–	–	4%	–	–	–	–	–	-	–	24%	–	–	5%	–	–	2%	–	32%	4%
Ifop	16–18 Apr 2024	1,090	1%	2%	5%	13%	–	–	–	3%	–	–	–	–	2%	22%	–	–	–	–	–	–	–	2.5%	–	8%	–	–	2.5%	30%	–	9%
Ifop	16–18 Apr 2024	1,090	1.5%	0.5%	4.5%	14%	–	–	–	3%	–	–	–	–	2%	–	–	–	–	–	–	–	26%	–	–	5%	–	–	2%	33%	–	7%
Ifop	16–18 Apr 2024	1,090	2%	1.5%	6%	15%	–	–	–	5.5%	–	–	–	–	3%	–	–	–	–	12%	–	–	–	2%	–	8.5%	–	–	2%	–	36%	6.5%
Ifop	16–18 Apr 2024	1,090	1.5%	1.5%	5%	16%	–	–	–	4.5%	–	–	–	–	2.5%	–	–	–	–	–	14%	–	–	2%	–	8%	–	–	3%	–	35%	7%
Ifop	16–18 Apr 2024	1,090	1%	2%	4%	14%	–	–	–	4%	–	–	–	–	3%	20%	–	–	–	–	–	–	–	2%	–	7%	–	–	2%	–	35%	6%
Ifop	16–18 Apr 2024	1,090	1.5%	1.5%	4.5%	13%	–	–	–	4.5%	–	–	–	–	2%	–	–	–	–	–	–	–	24%	2%	–	5%	–	–	3%	–	34%	5%
Ifop	16–18 Apr 2024	1,090	1.5%	1%	5%	13%	–	–	–	4%	–	–	–	–	2.5%	–	–	–	–	–	–	–	24%	2%	6%	–	–	–	2%	–	33%	6%
Ifop	16–18 Apr 2024	1,090	1%	2%	5.5%	12%	–	–	–	–	8%	–	–	–	–	–	–	–	–	–	–	–	24%	2%	–	5%	–	–	2%	–	32%	6.5%
Ifop	16–18 Apr 2024	1,090	1.5%	2%	5%	–	7%	–	–	3.5%	–	–	–	–	3%	–	–	–	–	–	–	–	26%	3%	–	5%	–	–	2.5%	–	35%	6.5%
Cluster17	2–5 Apr 2024	1,686	–	2%	–	–	29%	–	–	–	–	–	–	–	–	–	–	–	–	–	–	–	25%	–	–	4.5%	–	–	3%	–	31%	6.5%
Cluster17	2–5 Apr 2024	1,686	–	3%	–	18%	–	–	–	–	–	–	–	–	–	–	–	–	–	–	–	–	31%	–	–	5%	–	–	4%	–	32%	7%
Ifop	31 Jan – 1 Feb 2024	1,081	1.5%	1.5%	4%	14%	–	–	–	2%	–	–	–	–	2%	22%	–	–	–	–	–	–	–	3%	–	5.5%	–	–	2.5%	–	36%	6%
Ifop	31 Jan – 1 Feb 2024	1,081	1.5%	1.5%	4.5%	14%	–	–	–	2%	–	–	–	–	2.5%	–	–	–	–	–	–	–	22%	3%	–	4.5%	–	–	2.5%	–	36%	6%
Ifop	9–10 Jan 2024	1,144	1%	2%	5%	14.5%	–	–	–	4%	–	–	–	–	1%	24%	–	–	–	–	–	–	–	2.5%	–	6%	–	–	3%	28%	–	9%
Ifop	9–10 Jan 2024	1,144	0.5%	1.5%	6%	15%	–	–	–	3.5%	–	–	–	–	1.5%	–	–	–	–	–	–	–	26%	2.5%	–	6%	–	–	2.5%	27%	–	8%
Ifop	9–10 Jan 2024	1,144	0.5%	2%	6.5%	14%	–	–	–	3.5%	–	–	–	–	1.5%	23%	–	–	–	–	–	–	–	2.5%	–	6%	–	–	2%	–	32%	6.5%
Ifop	9–10 Jan 2024	1,144	0.5%	1.5%	6%	13%	–	–	–	3%	–	–	–	–	2%	–	–	–	–	–	–	–	25%	2.5%	–	5%	–	–	2%	–	33%	6.5%
Ifop	24–25 Oct 2023	1,179	1%	1%	6%	14%	–	–	–	5%	–	–	–	–	2%	19%	–	–	–	–	–	–	–	4%	–	6%	–	–	3%	–	33%	6%
Ifop	24–25 Oct 2023	1,179	1.5%	1.5%	6%	15%	–	–	–	6%	–	–	–	–	2%	–	–	–	–	16%	–	–	–	3.5%	–	6%	–	–	2.5%	–	33%	7%
Ifop	24–25 Oct 2023	1,179	1.5%	1%	7%	15%	–	–	–	5.5%	–	–	–	–	2%	–	–	–	–	–	18%	–	–	3%	–	6%	–	–	2.5%	–	32%	6.5%
Ifop	24–25 Oct 2023	1,179	1.5%	2%	7.5%	–	7%	–	–	4%	–	–	–	–	2%	–	–	–	–	–	–	–	26%	2.5%	–	6%	–	–	3%	–	32%	6.5%
Ifop	24–25 Oct 2023	1,179	1%	2%	6%	14%	–	–	–	4%	–	–	–	–	1%	–	–	–	–	–	–	–	25%	2.5%	–	5%	–	–	2%	–	31%	6.5%
Harris Interactive	1–4 Sep 2023	2,525	1%	2%	6%	16%	–	7%	–	–	–	–	5%	–	–	–	–	–	–	–	16%	–	–	–	–	7%	–	–	2%	–	32%	6%
Harris Interactive	1–4 Sep 2023	2,525	1%	2%	6%	16%	–	8%	–	–	–	–	6%	–	–	–	–	–	–	14%	–	–	–	–	–	7%	–	–	2%	–	32%	6%
Harris Interactive	1–4 Sep 2023	2,525	1%	2%	6%	16%	–	9%	–	–	–	–	5%	–	–	–	11%	–	–	–	–	–	–	–	–	9%	–	–	2%	–	33%	6%
Harris Interactive	1–4 Sep 2023	2,525	1%	2%	6%	17%	–	10%	–	–	–	–	7%	–	–	–	–	5%	–	–	–	–	–	–	–	10%	–	–	3%	–	33%	6%
Harris Interactive	1–4 Sep 2023	2,525	1%	2%	5%	16%	–	8%	–	–	–	–	7%	–	–	12%	–	–	–	–	–	–	–	–	–	8%	–	–	2%	–	32%	7%
Harris Interactive	1–4 Sep 2023	2,525	1%	2%	6%	17%	–	9%	–	–	–	–	6%	–	–	–	–	–	9%	–	–	–	–	–	–	9%	–	–	2%	–	33%	6%
Harris Interactive	1–4 Sep 2023	2,525	1%	2%	6%	16%	–	10%	–	–	–	–	6%	–	–	–	–	–	–	–	–	8%	–	–	–	9%	–	–	3%	–	33%	6%
Harris Interactive	1–4 Sep 2023	2,525	1%	2%	6%	16%	–	5%	–	–	–	–	5%	–	–	–	–	–	–	–	–	–	22%	–	–	5%	–	–	2%	–	30%	6%
OpinionWay	12–13 Apr 2023	1,038	1%	3%	–	17%	–	–	–	6%	–	–	–	2%	–	–	–	–	–	–	–	–	32%	–	–	7%	–	–	–	23%	–	9%
Harris Interactive	6–7 Apr 2023	1,320	1%	1%	4%	16%	–	5%	–	–	–	–	4%	–	–	–	–	–	–	–	–	–	24%	–	–	5%	–	–	2%	–	30%	7%
Harris Interactive	6–7 Apr 2023	1,320	1%	1%	5%	18%	–	7%	–	–	–	–	5%	–	–	–	–	–	–	–	16%	–	–	–	–	5%	–	–	2%	–	32%	7%
Harris Interactive	6–7 Apr 2023	1,320	1%	1%	5%	19%	–	8%	–	–	–	–	5%	–	–	–	–	–	–	10%	–	–	–	–	–	7%	–	–	2%	–	33%	8%
Harris Interactive	6–7 Apr 2023	1,320	1%	1%	4%	17%	–	–	3%	–	–	–	4%	–	–	–	–	–	–	–	–	–	24%	–	–	5%	–	–	2%	–	31%	7%
Ifop	30–31 Mar 2023	1,105	1%	2.5%	5%	17%	–	–	–	3%	–	–	–	–	1%	–	–	–	–	–	–	–	26%	2%	–	5%	–	–	2.5%	–	29%	6%
Ifop	30–31 Mar 2023	1,105	1%	2.5%	–	22%	–	–	–	–	–	–	–	–	–	–	–	–	–	–	–	–	28%	2.5%	–	4%	–	–	3%	–	31%	6%
Ifop	30–31 Mar 2023	1,105	1%	2.5%	6%	20%	–	–	–	2%	–	–	–	–	1%	–	–	–	–	–	18%	–	–	2.5%	–	6%	–	–	3%	–	32%	6%
Ifop	30–31 Mar 2023	1,105	0.5%	2.5%	5%	20%	–	–	–	3%	–	–	–	–	2%	–	–	–	–	11%	–	–	–	2%	–	8%	–	–	4%	–	35%	7%
Ifop	30–31 Mar 2023	1,105	1%	1.5%	6.5%	20%	–	–	–	2%	–	–	–	–	1%	–	–	–	–	–	–	9%	–	3%	–	10%	–	–	3%	–	36%	7%
2022 election	10 Apr 2022	–	0.56%	0.76%	2.28%	21.95%		–	–	–	–	–	4.63%	–	–	–	–	–	–	–	–	–	–	3.13%	–	–	–	–	2.06%	–	23.15%	7.07%

== Second round ==
This round occurs if no candidate earns an absolute majority of the votes (excluding blank and void ballots) in the first round. The two candidates who receive the most votes in the first round move on to the second round with the candidate who receives the most votes being declared the winner.

=== Philippe vs. Le Pen ===
Polling firm	Fieldwork date	Sample size		
Polling firm	Fieldwork date	Sample size	Philippe HOR	Le Pen RN
Harris Interactive	3–5 Nov 2026	2,101	42%	58%
OpinionWay	21–22 Oct 2026	973	44%	56%
Harris Interactive	19–21 Oct 2026	2,094	43%	57%
Ifop	17–19 Oct 2026	1,928	44%	56%
Elabe	14–16 Oct 2026	1,701	47.5%	52.5%
YouGov	12–15 Oct 2026	1,094	48%	52%
OpinionWay	13–14 Oct 2026	1,043	44%	56%
Harris Interactive	5–8 Oct 2026	2,004	44%	56%
Odoxa	24 Sep – 7 Oct 2026	12,005	47%	53%
Harris Interactive	22–24 Sep 2026	1,974	43%	57%
Harris Interactive	8–10 Sep 2026	2,052	45%	55%
Ifop	24–25 Aug 2026	1,598	48%	52%
Harris Interactive	18–19 Aug 2026	1,764	45%	55%
Cluster17	22–24 Jul 2026	1,506	48%	52%
Harris Interactive	7–8 Jul 2026	1,582	49%	51%
Ifop	7–8 Jul 2026	984	46%	54%
Harris Interactive	25–27 May 2026	1,744	48%	52%
Elabe	25–27 Mar 2026	1,504	53%	47%
Odoxa	23–24 Apr 2025	1,005	54%	46%
Ifop/Hexagone	11–18 Apr 2025	9,128	52%	48%
Ifop	20–24 Apr 2024	1,081	49%	51%
Ifop	31 Jan – 1 Feb 2024	1,081	50%	50%

=== Attal vs. Le Pen ===
Polling firm	Fieldwork date	Sample size		
Polling firm	Fieldwork date	Sample size	Attal RE	Le Pen RN
Ifop	17–19 Oct 2026	1,928	42%	58%
YouGov	12–15 Oct 2026	1,094	45%	55%
Harris Interactive	8–10 Sep 2026	2,052	44%	56%
Ifop	24–25 Aug 2026	1,598	46%	54%
Harris Interactive	18–19 Aug 2026	1,764	43%	57%
Cluster17	22–24 Jul 2026	1,506	44%	56%
Harris Interactive	7–8 Jul 2026	1,582	45%	55%
Ifop	7–8 Jul 2026	984	45%	55%
Harris Interactive	25–27 May 2026	1,744	46%	54%
Elabe	25–27 Mar 2026	1,504	49%	51%
Ifop	20–24 Apr 2024	1,081	47%	53%
Ifop	31 Jan – 1 Feb 2024	1,081	49%	51%

=== Glucksmann vs. Le Pen ===
Polling firm	Fieldwork date	Sample size		
Polling firm	Fieldwork date	Sample size	Glucksmann PP	Le Pen RN
Harris Interactive	3–5 Nov 2026	2,101	40%	60%
OpinionWay	21–22 Oct 2026	973	44%	56%
Harris Interactive	19–21 Oct 2026	2,094	41%	59%
Ifop	17–19 Oct 2026	1,928	43%	57%
Elabe	14–16 Oct 2026	1,701	46.5%	53.5%
YouGov	12–15 Oct 2026	1,094	45%	55%
OpinionWay	13–14 Oct 2026	1,043	44%	56%
Elabe	26–28 Aug 2026	1,501	43%	57%
Ifop	24–25 Aug 2026	1,598	45%	55%
Cluster17	22–24 Jul 2026	1,506	44%	56%

=== Mélenchon vs. Le Pen ===
Polling firm	Fieldwork date	Sample size		
Polling firm	Fieldwork date	Sample size	Mélenchon LFI	Le Pen RN
Harris Interactive	18–19 Nov 2026	2,088	35%	65%
Harris Interactive	3–5 Nov 2026	2,101	32%	68%
OpinionWay	21–22 Oct 2026	973	31%	69%
Harris Interactive	19–21 Oct 2026	2,094	30%	70%
Ifop	17–19 Oct 2026	1,928	32%	68%
Elabe	14–16 Oct 2026	1,701	31%	69%
YouGov	12–15 Oct 2026	1,094	32%	68%
OpinionWay	13–14 Oct 2026	1,043	32%	68%
Harris Interactive	5–8 Oct 2026	2,004	33%	67%
Odoxa	24 Sep – 7 Oct 2026	12,005	32%	68%
Harris Interactive	22–24 Sep 2026	1,974	31%	69%
Harris Interactive	8–10 Sep 2026	2,052	33%	67%
Ifop	24–25 Aug 2026	1,598	33%	67%
Harris Interactive	18–19 Aug 2026	1,764	32%	68%
Cluster17	22–24 Jul 2026	1,506	39%	61%
Harris Interactive	7–8 Jul 2026	1,582	33%	67%
Ifop	7–8 Jul 2026	984	30%	70%
Harris Interactive	25–27 May 2026	1,744	33%	67%
Cluster17	2–5 Apr 2024	1,686	35%	65%
Ifop	31 Jan – 1 Feb 2024	1,081	36%	64%

=== Ruffin vs. Le Pen ===
Polling firm	Fieldwork date	Sample size		
Polling firm	Fieldwork date	Sample size	Ruffin PD	Le Pen RN
Cluster17	2–5 Apr 2024	1,686	50%	50%

=== Hollande vs. Le Pen ===
Polling firm	Fieldwork date	Sample size		
Polling firm	Fieldwork date	Sample size	Hollande PS	Le Pen RN
Ifop	17–19 Oct 2026	1,928	41%	59%
Ifop	24–25 Aug 2026	1,598	46%	54%

=== Retailleau vs. Le Pen ===
Polling firm	Fieldwork date	Sample size		
Polling firm	Fieldwork date	Sample size	Retailleau LR	Le Pen RN
Ifop	24–25 Aug 2026	1,598	42%	58%
Cluster17	22–24 Jul 2026	1,506	43%	57%

=== No longer candidates ===
Jordan Bardella was included as the likely candidate for the Rassemblement National in several polls during 2025 and 2026 when it appeared that Marine Le Pen's legal problems would prevent her from running.

==== Philippe vs. Bardella ====
Polling firm	Fieldwork date	Sample size		
Polling firm	Fieldwork date	Sample size	Philippe HOR	Bardella RN
Harris Interactive	25–27 May 2026	1,744	46%	54%
Odoxa	20–21 May 2026	1,005	48%	52%
Odoxa	25–26 Mar 2026	1,005	52%	48%
Elabe	25–27 Mar 2026	1,504	51.5%	48.5%
Odoxa	19–20 Nov 2025	1,300	47%	53%
Odoxa	23–24 Apr 2025	1,005	54%	46%
Ifop/Hexagone	11–18 Apr 2025	9,128	50%	50%

==== Attal vs. Bardella ====
Polling firm	Fieldwork date	Sample size		
Polling firm	Fieldwork date	Sample size	Attal RE	Bardella RN
Harris Interactive	25–27 May 2026	1,744	43%	57%
Odoxa	19–20 Nov 2025	1,300	44%	56%
Ifop/Hexagone	11–18 Apr 2025	9,128	48%	52%

==== Glucksmann vs. Bardella ====
Polling firm	Fieldwork date	Sample size		
Polling firm	Fieldwork date	Sample size	Glucksmann PP	Bardella RN
Elabe	25–27 Mar 2026	1,504	41.5%	58.5%
Odoxa	19–20 Nov 2025	1,300	42%	58%

==== Mélenchon vs. Bardella ====
Polling firm	Fieldwork date	Sample size		
Polling firm	Fieldwork date	Sample size	Mélenchon LFI	Bardella RN
Harris Interactive	25–27 May 2026	1,744	32%	68%
Elabe	25–27 Mar 2026	1,504	28.5%	71.5%
Odoxa	19–20 Nov 2025	1,300	26%	74%
Ifop/Hexagone	11–18 Apr 2025	9,128	33%	67%

==== Retailleau vs. Bardella ====
Polling firm	Fieldwork date	Sample size		
Polling firm	Fieldwork date	Sample size	Retailleau LR	Bardella RN
Elabe	25–27 Mar 2026	1,504	42%	58%
Ifop/Hexagone	11–18 Apr 2025	9,128	47%	53%

== Scenario polling ==
=== Generic candidates ===
Polling firm	Fieldwork date	Sample size	Generic EXG	Generic LFI	Generic NFP	Generic PS/PP	Generic ENS	Generic DIV	Generic LR	Generic UDR	Generic DLF	Generic RN	Generic REC!
Harris Interactive	24–25 Apr 2025	1,035	3%	–	26%	–	19%	1%	10%	2%	2%	34%	3%
Harris Interactive	24–25 Apr 2025	1,035	2%	8%	20%	–	18%	1%	10%	2%	2%	34%	3%
Harris Interactive	24–25 Apr 2025	1,035	3%	–	16%	13%	17%	1%	10%	1%	2%	34%	3%

=== Bardella runs ===
Due to the National Front assistants affair and her ensuing embezzlement conviction, Marine Le Pen was initially barred from running for public office for five years on 31 March 2025. Therefore, there was speculation that Jordan Bardella would run instead. However, on 7 July 2026, her election ban was shortened to 15 months, allowing her to run.

=== Cluster 17 Poll ===
The Cluster 17 study presents three scenarios featuring different candidates. Édouard Philippe appears in the first scenario but not Gabriel Attal; however, the latter is included in the second scenario. Raphaël Glucksmann is absent only from the third scenario, where he is replaced by François Hollande. Finally, Éric Zemmour appears in the first two scenarios but not the last, where he is replaced by David Lisnard.

==== January – June 2026 ====
Polling firm	Fieldwork date	Sample size	Arthaud (LO)	Roussel (PCF)	Mélenchon (LFI)	Ruffin (D!)	Faure (PS)	Hollande (PS)	Glucksmann (PP)	Tondelier (LE)	Attal (RE)	Darmanin (RE)	Lecornu (RE)	Philippe (HOR)	de Villepin (LFH)	Retailleau (LR)	Dupont-Aignan (DLF)	Bardella (RN)	Knafo (R!)	Zemmour (R!)
Ifop	22–24 Jun 2026	1,415	0.5%	3%	13%	–	–	–	10%	3.5%	–	–	–	19%	–	9%	2%	36%	–	4%
Ifop	22–24 Jun 2026	1,415	0.5%	3%	13%	–	–	–	9%	2.5%	8%	–		14%	–	8%	2%	36%	–	4%
Ifop	22–24 Jun 2026	1,415	0.5%	2.5%	13%	–	–	–	11%	3.5%	15%	–	–	–	–	11%	2%	37%	–	4.5%
Ifop	22–24 Jun 2026	1,415	1.5%	–	15%	–	–	9%	–	–	–	–	–	21%	–	10%	3%	37%	–	3.5%
Ifop	22–24 Jun 2026	1,415	1.5%	–	14%	–	–	–	11%	–	–	–	–	20%	–	11%	2.5%	36%	–	4%
OpinionWay	10–11 Jun 2026	1,001	1%	–	16%	–	–	–	16%	–	–	–	–	19%	–	9%	2%	34%	–	3%
OpinionWay	10–11 Jun 2026	1,001	1%	3%	13%	–	–	–	13%	–	–	–	–	19%	–	8%	2%	33%	–	3%
OpinionWay	10–11 Jun 2026	1,001	1%	4%	13%	–	–	–	14%	–	14%	–	–	–	–	9%	2%	35%	–	4%
Ipsos	27–28 May 2026	1,500	1%	3%	13.5%	–	–	7%	–	4%	9.5%	–	–	13.5%	–	8%	1.5%	34%	–	4%
Ipsos	27–28 May 2026	1,500	1%	4%	13%	–	–	–	11%	4%	8.5%	–	–	13%	–	7.5%	1.5%	33.5%	–	4%
Ipsos	27–28 May 2026	1,500	1%	3%	13.5%	–	–	7.5%	–	4%	–	–	–	19%	–	9%	1.5%	35.5%	–	4%
Ipsos	27–28 May 2026	1,500	1%	3.5%	13.5%	–	–	8%	–	5%	17.5%	–	–	–	–	10%	1.5%	36%	–	4%
Ipsos	27–28 May 2026	1,500	1%	3%	13%	–	–	–	13%	4%	–	–	–	17.5%	–	9%	1.5%	34%	–	4%
Ipsos	27–28 May 2026	1,500	1%	3%	13%	–	–	–	14%	4%	14.5%	–	–	–	–	10%	1.5%	35%	–	4%
Ifop	26–28 May 2026	1,368	0.5%	3%	12.5%	3%	–	–	9%	4%	–	–	–	20%	–	9%	2.5%	34%	–	3%
Ifop	26–28 May 2026	1,368	0.5%	6%	13.5%	–	4%	–	–	4%	–	–	–	21%	–	10%	2.5%	35%	–	3.5%
Ifop	26–28 May 2026	1,368	1%	3%	13.5%	–	–	8%	–	5%	18.5%	–	–	–	–	10%	2%	35%	–	3.5%
Ifop	26–28 May 2026	1,368	0.5%	4%	14%	–	–	8%	–	5%	–	–	–	20%	–	9%	1.5%	34%	–	4%
Ifop	26–28 May 2026	1,368	1.5%	–	15%	–	–	11%	–	–	–	–	–	22%	–	10%	2.5%	34%	–	4%
Ifop	26–28 May 2026	1,368	1%	–	15%	–	–	–	12%	–	–	–	–	22%	–	10%	3%	33%	–	4%
Ifop	26–28 May 2026	1,368	0.5%	3%	13%	–	–	–	11%	4%	16%	–	–	–	2.5%	10%	2.5%	34%	–	3%
Ifop	26–28 May 2026	1,368	0.5%	2.5%	13%	–	–	–	9%	4%	9%	–	–	14%	–	8%	2%	34%	–	4%
Ifop	26–28 May 2026	1,368	0.5%	3.5%	13%	–	–	–	10%	4%	–	–	–	18%	2.5%	9%	2%	34%	–	3.5%
Harris Interactive	25–27 May 2026	1,744	1%	3%	14%	–	–	–	10%	3%	9%	–	–	13%	–	8%	2%	32%	–	5%
Harris Interactive	25–27 May 2026	1,744	1%	4%	15%	–	–	–	11%	3%	14%	–	–	–	–	10%	2%	34%	–	6%
Harris Interactive	25–27 May 2026	1,744	1%	3%	15%	–	–	–	10%	3%	–	–	–	17%	–	9%	2%	34%	–	6%
Odoxa	20–21 May 2026	1,005	0.5%	2.5%	16%	–	–	–	11%	4%	–	–	–	17%	–	9%	2%	32%	–	6%
Harris Interactive	28–30 Apr 2026	1,725	1%	3%	13%	–	–	–	12%	4%	14%	–	–	–	–	12%	1%	35%	–	5%
Harris Interactive	28–30 Apr 2026	1,725	1%	4%	12%	–	–	–	11%	4%	–	–	–	19%	–	9%	1%	34%	–	5%
OpinionWay	26–27 Mar 2026	1,009	1%	–	14%	–	–	12%	–	–	–	–	–	18%	–	11%	–	38%	5%	–
OpinionWay	26–27 Mar 2026	1,009	1%	–	13%	–	–	–	15%	–	15%	–	–	–	–	14%	–	38%	5%	–
Elabe	25–27 Mar 2026	1,504	1%	4%	12%	–	4.5%	–	–	4.5%	–	–	–	25.5%	3%	–	2.5%	38%	5%	–
Elabe	25–27 Mar 2026	1,504	0.5%	3%	13%	–	–	–	12.5%	5%	–	8%	–	–	5%	8.5%	2.5%	38.5%	3.5%	–
Elabe	25–27 Mar 2026	1,504	1%	3%	11%	8%	–	–	12%	–	–	–	6.5%	–	5.5%	9.5%	2.5%	37.5%	–	3.5%
Elabe	25–27 Mar 2026	1,504	0.5%	3%	10.5%	–	–	–	10.5%	4.5%	–	–	–	20.5%	3%	7%	2.5%	36%	–	3%
Odoxa	25–26 Mar 2026	1,005	1%	2%	12%	–	–	–	10%	5%	–	–	–	21%	–	8%	2%	34%	5%	–
Odoxa	25–26 Mar 2026	1,005	1%	2%	13%	–	–	–	10%	4%	–	–	–	25%	–	–	2%	38%	5%	–
Harris Interactive	22 Mar 2026	1,000	1%	3%	13%	–	–	–	14%	5%	13%	–	–	–	–	10%	2%	36%	–	5%
Harris Interactive	22 Mar 2026	1,000	1%	3%	11%	–	–	–	14%	4%	–	–	–	18%	–	7%	2%	35%	–	5%
Ifop	26–27 Feb 2026	1,393	2%	3%	11%	–	5%	–	–	5%	–	–	–	19%	–	11%	3.5%	36%	–	4.5%
Ifop	26–27 Feb 2026	1,393	2%	3%	11%	–	–	8%	–	5%	–	–	–	18%	–	11%	2%	36%	–	4%
Ifop	26–27 Feb 2026	1,393	2%	3%	10%	–	–	–	12%	4%	11%	–	–	–	4%	12%	2%	36%	–	4%
Ifop	26–27 Feb 2026	1,393	1.5%	3%	10%	–	–	–	13%	4%	–	8%	–	–	5%	13%	2.5%	37%	–	3%
Ifop	26–27 Feb 2026	1,393	2%	3%	10%	–	–	–	13%	4.5%	–	–	6%	–	5%	13%	3%	37%	–	3.5%
Ifop	26–27 Feb 2026	1,393	1%	2%	11%	–	–	–	10%	4%	–	–	–	16%	3.5%	10%	2.5%	36%	–	4%
Ifop	26–27 Feb 2026	1,393	2%	2.5%	12%	–	–	–	11%	4.5%	–	–	–	23%	–	–	3%	37%	–	5%
Ifop	26–27 Feb 2026	1,393	2%	3%	12%	–	–	–	16%	5%	–	–	–	–	–	17%	3%	38%	–	4%
Ifop	1–6 Feb 2026	1,137	1%	3%	13%	–	–	–	9%	3%	8%	–	–	11%	2%	6%	2%	36%	–	4%

==== March – December 2025 ====
Polling firm	Fieldwork date	Sample size	Arthaud (LO)	Poutou (NPA)	Roussel (PCF)	Mélenchon (LFI)	Ruffin (D!)	Faure (PS)	Hollande (PS)	Glucksmann (PP)	Tondelier (LE)	Attal (RE)	Darmanin (RE)	Lecornu (RE)	Bayrou (MD)	Philippe (HOR)	de Villepin (LFH)	Bertrand (NF)	Wauquiez (LR)	Retailleau (LR)	Hanouna (DIV)	Dupont-Aignan (DLF)	Bardella (RN)	de Villiers (R!)	Knafo (R!)	Zemmour (R!)	Leclerc (DIV)	Riner (DIV)	Sébastien (DIV)
Odoxa	19–20 Nov 2025	1,300	1%	–	3%	12%	–	–	–	14.5%	6.5%	11%	–	–	–	–	–	–	–	10%	–	3%	36%	–	–	3%	–	–	–
Odoxa	19–20 Nov 2025	1,300	1%	–	3%	11%	–	–	–	13.5%	6%	–	–	–	–	17%	–	–	–	8%	–	2%	35%	–	–	3.5%	–	–	–
Verian	18–20 Nov 2025	938	–	–	3%	12%	–	–	–	13%	5.5%	–	–	–	–	17%	–	–	–	7.5%	–	2%	36.5%	–	–	4%	–	–	–
Verian	18–20 Nov 2025	938	–	–	3%	12%	–	–	–	13%	5%	–	–	–	–	17%	–	–	–	7.5%	1%	2%	35.5%	–	–	4%	–	–	–
Verian	18–20 Nov 2025	938	–	–	3%	12%	–	–	–	12.5%	5%	–	–	–	–	16.5%	–	–	–	7.5%	–	2%	35.5%	–	–	4%	2%	–	–
Verian	18–20 Nov 2025	938	–	–	3%	11.5%	–	–	–	11.5%	5%	–	–	–	–	17%	–	–	–	7.5%	–	2%	35.5%	–	–	4%	–	3%	–
Verian	18–20 Nov 2025	938	–	–	3%	11%	–	–	–	13%	5%	–	–	–	–	17%	–	–	–	7.5%	–	2%	35.5%	–	–	4%	–	–	2%
Elabe	30–31 Oct 2025	1,501	1%	–	4.5%	12.5%	–	5.5%	–	–	5.5%	–	–	–	–	19.5%	4%	–	3%	–	–	2.5%	36.5%	–	6%	–	–	–	–
Elabe	30–31 Oct 2025	1,501	1%	–	3%	12%	–	–	6.5%	–	5.5%	–	–	–	–	19%	4%	5.5%	–	–	–	2.5%	35%	–	–	6%	–	–	–
Elabe	30–31 Oct 2025	1,501	1.5%	–	3%	13%	–	–	–	13%	5%	–	7%	–	–	–	5%	–	–	8%	–	2%	37.5%	4.5%	–	–	–	–	–
Elabe	30–31 Oct 2025	1,501	1%	–	3%	12.5%	–	–	–	11%	4.5%	–	–	–	–	15.5%	3%	–	–	8%	–	2%	35%	–	–	4.5%	–	–	–
Harris Interactive	7 Oct 2025	1,124	1%	–	3%	14%	–	–	–	14%	3%	12%	–	–	–	–	–	–	–	11%	–	1%	35%	–	–	6%	–	–	–
Harris Interactive	7 Oct 2025	1,124	1%	–	3%	14%	–	–	–	12%	3%	–	–	–	–	15%	–	–	–	10%	–	1%	35%	–	–	6%	–	–	–
Cluster17	30 Sep – 1 Oct 2025	1,534	1%	–	4%	14%	–	8%	–	–	–	–	–	–	–	19.5%	–	–	–	13%	–	4.5%	30%	–	–	5.5%	–	–	–
Cluster17	30 Sep – 1 Oct 2025	1,534	1%	–	3%	15%	–	–	–	15%	–	–	–	–	–	15%	–	–	–	12%	–	3.5%	30%	–	–	5.5%	–	–	–
Cluster17	30 Sep – 1 Oct 2025	1,534	1%	–	4%	15%	–	–	–	–	7.5%	–	–	–	–	19.5%	–	–	–	12.5%	–	4%	31%	–	–	5.5%	–	–	–
Ifop	24–25 Sep 2025	1,210	1%	–	5%	13%	–	7%	–	–	–	–	–	–	–	19%	4.5%	–	–	10%	–	2%	34%	–	–	4.5%	–	–	–
Ifop	24–25 Sep 2025	1,210	1.5%	–	4%	13%	–	–	–	14%	–	10%	–	–	–	–	4%	–	–	12%	–	2.5%	34%	–	–	5%	–	–	–
Ifop	24–25 Sep 2025	1,210	1%	–	4%	13%	–	–	–	16%	–	–	7%	–	–	–	5%	–	–	13%	–	2%	35%	–	–	4%	–	–	–
Ifop	24–25 Sep 2025	1,210	2%	–	4%	13%	–	–	–	16%	–	–	–	–	3%	–	6%	–	–	13%	–	3%	35%	–	–	5%	–	–	–
Ifop	24–25 Sep 2025	1,210	1%	–	3.5%	12%	–	–	–	15%	–	–	–	–	–	16%	4%	–	–	9%	–	2%	33%	–	–	4.5%	–	–	–
Ifop	19–20 May 2025	1,114	1%	–	3.5%	13%	–	4.5%	–	–	4.5%	–	–	–	–	21%	–	–	–	16%	–	2%	31%	–	–	3.5%	–	–	–
Harris Interactive	19 May 2025	1,071	1%	–	3%	14%	–	–	–	11%	3%	15%	–	–	–	–	–	–	–	17%	–	–	31%	–	–	5%	–	–	–
Harris Interactive	19 May 2025	1,071	1%	–	3%	14%	–	–	–	10%	3%	–	–	–	–	21%	–	–	–	13%	–	–	30%	–	–	5%	–	–	–
Odoxa	23–24 Apr 2025	1,005	1%	2%	3%	12%	–	–	–	12%	4%	–	–	–	–	20%	–	–	–	9.5%	–	2%	31.5%	–	–	3%	–	–	–
Ifop/Hexagone	11–18 Apr 2025	9,128	2%	–	–	12%	10%	–	–	–	–	–	–	–	–	26%	–	–	–	10%	–	3%	33%	–	–	4%	–	–	–
Ifop/Hexagone	11–18 Apr 2025	9,128	1%	–	2.5%	10%	5%	–	–	10%	3%	14%	–	–	–	–	–	–	–	14%	–	2%	33%	–	–	4%	–	–	–
Ifop/Hexagone	11–18 Apr 2025	9,128	1%	–	2.5%	10%	4.5%	–	–	9%	2%	8%	–	–	–	15%	2%	–	–	7.5%	–	2.5%	32%	–	–	4%	–	–	–
Ifop/Hexagone	11–18 Apr 2025	9,128	1%	–	2.5%	10%	5%	–	–	10%	3%	–	–	–	–	24%	–	–	3%	–	–	2.5%	35%	–	–	4%	–	–	–
Ifop/Hexagone	11–18 Apr 2025	9,128	1%	–	2.5%	10%	5%	–	–	10%	2.5%	–	–	–	–	22%	2%	–	–	8%	–	2%	33%	–	–	4%	–	–	–
Ifop/Hexagone	11–18 Apr 2025	9,128	1%	–	2.5%	10%	5%	–	–	10%	2.5%	–	–	–	–	22%	–	–	–	8%	–	2%	33%	–	–	4%	–	–	–
Ifop/Hexagone	11–18 Apr 2025	9,128	1.5%	–	–	13%	–	–	–	15%	–	–	–	–	–	22%	–	–	–	9%	–	2.5%	33%	–	–	4%	–	–	–
Elabe	2–4 Apr 2025	1,413	1.5%	2%	5.5%	10.5%	–	4%	–	–	4.5%	18%	–	–	–	–	–	–	4.5%	–	–	4%	35.5%	–	–	5%	–	–	–
Elabe	2–4 Apr 2025	1,413	1%	1.5%	5.5%	10%	–	6%	–	–	6%	–	–	–	–	23%	–	–	–	9%	–	2.5%	31.5%	–	–	4%	–	–	–
Elabe	2–4 Apr 2025	1,413	1%	1.5%	4.5%	9.5%	–	–	–	10.5%	3.5%	–	–	–	–	20.5%	2.5%	–	–	8.5%	–	3%	31%	–	–	4%	–	–	–
Harris Interactive	31 Mar 2025	1,162	1%	1%	4%	13%	–	5%	–	–	4%	–	–	–	–	25%	–	–	4%	–	–	2%	36%	–	–	5%	–	–	–
Harris Interactive	31 Mar 2025	1,162	1%	1%	4%	13%	–	5%	–	–	4%	–	–	–	–	23%	–	–	–	7%	–	2%	35%	–	–	5%	–	–	–

=== Re-run of the 2022 election ===
Macron is not eligible to run for a third consecutive term.

==== First round ====
Polling firm	Fieldwork date	Sample size	Nathalie Arthaud	Philippe Poutou	Fabien Roussel	Jean-Luc Mélenchon	Anne Hidalgo	Yannick Jadot	Emmanuel Macron	Jean Lassalle	Valérie Pécresse	Nicolas Dupont-Aignan	Marine Le Pen	Éric Zemmour
Cluster17	18–20 Oct 2023	1,580	0.5%	0.5%	5%	17.5%	2%	5%	24.5%	3%	3.5%	3%	29.5%	6.5%
Odoxa	5–6 Apr 2023	1,005	1%	1%	5%	19%	2%	4%	23%	3%	3%	2%	32%	5%
Elabe	3–5 Apr 2023	1,808	0.5%	1%	4%	18.5%	1.5%	5%	23%	2.5%	3.5%	2.5%	31%	7%
Ifop	30–31 Mar 2023	1,105	0.5%	1%	5%	17%	2%	5%	25%	1.5%	4%	2%	31%	6%
Cluster17	4–6 Nov 2022	2,151	0.5%	1%	3%	20%	1%	5%	30%	2.5%	3%	2.5%	25.5%	6%
Ifop	25–26 Oct 2022	1,125	0.5%	1%	3%	17%	2%	6%	29%	1.5%	3%	2%	30%	5%
2022 election	10 Apr 2022	–	0.56%	0.76%	2.28%	21.95%	1.74%	4.63%	27.85%	3.13%	4.78%	2.06%	23.15%	7.07%

==== Second round ====
Polling firm	Fieldwork date	Sample size	Abstention		
Polling firm	Fieldwork date	Sample size	Abstention	Macron RE	Le Pen RN
Odoxa	5–6 Apr 2023	1,005	–	46%	54%
Elabe	3–5 Apr 2023	1,808	–	45%	55%
Cluster17	4–6 Nov 2022	2,151	–	51.5%	48.5%
Ifop	25–26 Oct 2022	1,125	–	53%	47%
2022 election	24 Apr 2022	–	28.01%	58.55%	41.45%
