= Louise Moreau (politician) =

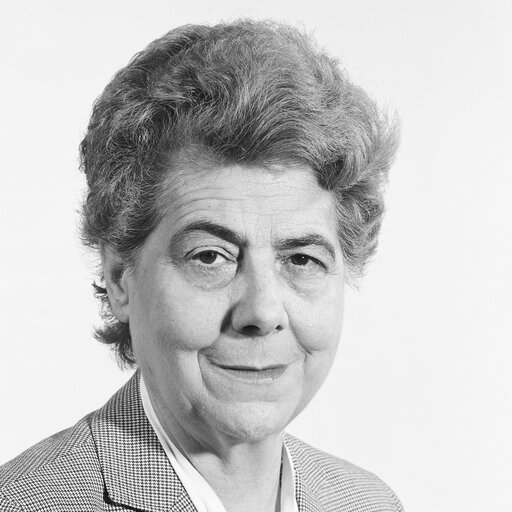

Member of the National Assembly
- In office 3 April 1978 – 1 April 1986
- Preceded by: Bernard Cornut-Gentille
- Succeeded by: Proportional by department
- Constituency: Alpes-Maritimes's 5th constituency (1981–1986)
- In office 2 April 1986 – 14 May 1988
- Constituency: Alpes-Maritimes (1986–1988)
- In office 23 June 1988 – 5 February 2001
- Preceded by: Constituency created
- Succeeded by: Bernard Brochand
- Constituency: Alpes-Maritimes's 8th constituency (1988–2001)

Member of the European Parliament for France
- In office 17 July 1979 – 23 July 1984

Personal details
- Born: Louise Julienne Jeanne Mont-Reynaud; 29 January 1921 Grenoble, Isère, France
- Died: 5 February 2001 (aged 80) Paris, France
- Party: Union for French Democracy
- Spouse: Pierre Moreau (died)
- Children: 1
- Awards: Croix de Guerre 1939–1945; Resistance Medal; Officer of the Legion of Honour

Louise Julienne Jeanne Moreau (née Mont-Reynaud; 29 January 1921 – 5 February 2001) was a French politician of the Union for French Democracy (UFD) party. She was the mayor of the town of Mandelieu-la-Napoule from 1971 to 1995. Moreau was a deputy in Alpes-Maritimes in the National Assembly from 1978 to 2001 and was a Member of the European Parliament of the European People's Party Group for France from 1979 to 1984. She was a recipient of the Croix de Guerre 1939–1945 and the Resistance Medal and was appointed an Officer of the Legion of Honour.

== Early life ==
Moreau was born in Grenoble, Isère on 29 January 1921. She was the daughter of the Bank of France director Pierre-François Mont-Reynaud and Marie-Pierrette Mont-Reynaud (née Lanfranchi). Moreau studied for a Bachelor of Science degree.

== Career ==
In August 1940, she joined the French Resistance headed by Charles de Gaulle in London. Following the Liberation of France, Moreau travelled around the world. She was sent to the United States as an associate of Georges Bidault as an delegate to the United Nations Conference on International Organization in San Francisco. Moreau was Secretary General of the first congress of the Europe-Africa Inter-Parliamentary Association in 1959. She was appointed vice-president of the Democratic Centre in 1967. A resident of Mandelieu-la-Napoule, Moreau was elected the town's mayor in 1971 and remained in the role until 1995. She became a member of the political bureau of the Democratic Centre in 1976 and became the party's national secretary the following year.

In 1978, Moreau was elected to represent Alpes-Maritimes's 5th constituency in the National Assembly at that year's legislative election on 19 March as a member of the Union for French Democracy (UFD) party. She was reelected at each subsequent election until the 1997 French legislative election. Moreau was a vice-president of the National Assembly on two occasions, firstly from 1984 to 1985 and secondly from 1997 to 1998. She was a member of the Parliamentary Delegation for Audiovisual Communication, the Foreign Affairs Committee, the Economic Affairs Committee, and the committee of the French Association for the Atlantic Community. Moreau was also a full member of the Conseil National du Tourisme, chairman of the France-Brazil friendship group, deputy chairman of the France-USA friendship group and a deputy chairman of the UFD group in the National Assembly in 1986. She was a committee member of the French delegation to the European Movement.

From 17 July 1979 to 23 July 1984, she was an elected Member of the European Parliament for France of the European People's Party Group. Moreau was a member of the Committee on External Economic Relations and the Delegation for relations with the United States. She was a member of the Polo de Paris club.

== Personal life ==
She was married to the businessman Pierre Moreau. They had one child. Moreau died at the Hôpital Cochin in Paris on 5 February 2001.

== Awards and legacy ==
She was a recipient of the Croix de Guerre 1939–1945 and the Resistance Medal for her actions during the Second World War. Moreau was appointed an Officer of the Legion of Honour for military service. She has been honoured at the Saint-Jean cemetery in Mandelieu-la Napoule every year since her death. The Boulevard du Midi in Cannes was named for her.
