= Alexandra Martin (born 1968) =

French politician (born 1968)

Member of the National Assembly for Alpes-Maritimes's 8th constituency
- Incumbent
- Assumed office 22 June 2022
- Preceded by: Bernard Brochand

Personal details
- Born: 25 October 1968 (age 58) Nice, France
- Party: The Republicans; Nouvelle Énergie

Alexandra Martin (born 25 October 1968) is a French politician who has represented the 8th constituency of Alpes-Maritimes in the National Assembly since 2022. She is affiliated with The Republicans (LR) and Nouvelle Énergie (NE).

== Biography ==
Alexandra Martin is the daughter of an engineer from Nice. She studied law at the University of Nice-Sophia-Antipolis.

== See also ==
- List of deputies of the 16th National Assembly of France
