= Bernard Brochand =

French businessman and politician (1938–2025)

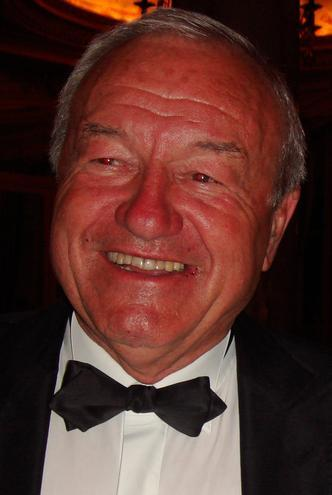
- Brochand in 2008

Member of the National Assembly for Alpes-Maritimes's 8th constituency
- In office 2 April 2001 – 21 June 2022
- Preceded by: Louise Moreau
- Succeeded by: Alexandra Martin

Mayor of Cannes
- In office 2001–2014
- Preceded by: Maurice Delauney
- Succeeded by: David Lisnard

Personal details
- Born: 5 June 1938 Nice, France
- Died: 25 February 2025 (aged 86) Cannes, France
- Party: The Republicans (2015–2025)
- Other political affiliations: Rally for the Republic (2001–2002); Union for a Popular Movement (2002–2015)
- Education: Lycée Louis-le-Grand
- Alma mater: HEC Paris

Bernard Brochand (French pronunciation: [bɛʁnaʁ bʁɔʃɑ̃]; 5 June 1938 – 25 February 2025) was a French politician, businessman, football executive, and football player. A member of The Republicans, he served in the National Assembly for Alpes-Maritimes's 8th constituency from 2001 to 2022. His constituency covered the Riviera resort of Cannes.

== Professional life ==
After graduation from HEC Paris, his career began at Procter & Gamble, before rising to be the head of Eurocom in 1975, and DDB International publicity agency in 1989.

His lifelong passion for sport, and especially football led to his joining the administration council of Paris Saint-Germain F.C. in 1971, and becoming the president of the club association at the end of the 1990s.

== Political career ==
Brochand was a member of The Republicans (LR) group in the National Assembly. In 2004, he co-signed a proposition to re-establish the death penalty for acts of terrorism.

At 79, he became the Father of the House at the 2017 parliamentary election.

He did not seek re-election in the 2022 French legislative election.

== Death ==
Brochand died on 25 February 2025, at the age of 86.

== Honors and awards ==
- Chevalier of the Order of Legion of Honour (1993)
- Knight of the Ordre National du Mérite (1977)
- Knight of the Ordre des Arts et des Lettres (1984)
- Medal of Pushkin (2007)
