= Alpes-Maritimes's 8th constituency =

Constituency of the National Assembly of France

8th constituency of Alpes Maritimes
- inline Constituency of the National Assembly of France

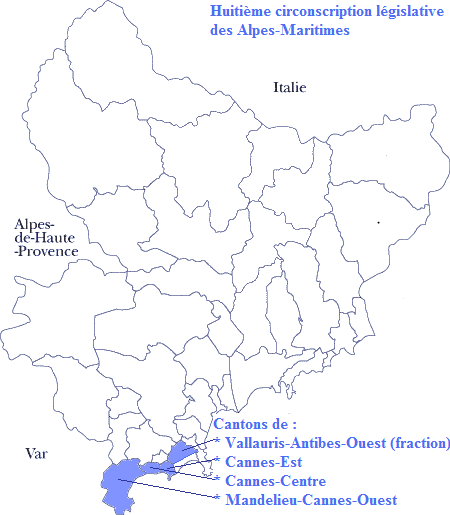
- Constituency in department

- Alpes Maritimes in France
- Deputy: Alexandra Martin; LR
- Department: Alpes Maritimes
- Cantons: Antibes-Biot, Antibes-Centre, Bar-sur-Loup, Vallauris-Antibes Ouest

The 8th constituency of Alpes-Maritimes is a French legislative constituency currently represented by Alexandra Martin of The Republicans (LR). It contains the town and surrounding areas of Cannes.

== Historic Representation ==
This constituency has existed since 1986 and elects deputies since 1988. Never in its history, it has elected left-of-centre candidates and, since 1993, no such candidate has even reached the second round of a legislative election.

The first historically elected deputy is Louise Moreau from centre-right UDF. From 1971 to 1995, she is mayor of Mandelieu-la-Napoule, a city bordering Cannes to the west. First elected as deputy in 1978, representing the former 5th constituency, she claims this new seat on a wide margin in 1988 against a socialist candidate. In 1993, she has to face Michel Mouillot, the then mayor of Cannes. The election is close but she is reelected. In 1995, Louise Moreau is defeated during the municipal election in Mandelieu and in 1997, her successor, Henri Leroy, also a right-wing candidate, is a candidate against her. Leroy is eliminated in the first round and Moreau prevails again in the second round, facing a far-right cadndiate from the National Front. Moreau dies in 2001, causing a by-election to replace her.

Then, the newly-elected mayor of Cannes, from the right-wing RPR, Bernard Brochand is elected against the UDF candidate. Brochand is widely reelected in 2002, against a National Front candidate in the second round. In 2007, the Mandelieu mayor, Henri Leroy is once again a candidate and faces Brochand in the second round. Brochand is reelected on a reduced margin. In 2012, he garners almost two thirds of the vote in the second round, opposing him to the National Front, once again. In 2017, he is reelected against an En Marche ! candidate. He is aged 79 upon this election and as such, becomes the most senior member of the Assembly.

In 2022, Brochand retires and Alexandra Martin is the new candidate for his party, The Republicans. Martin is elected with almost 70% of the vote in the second round. She is the female departmental councillor for the canton of Cannes-2.

Election	Member	Party
1988	Louise Moreau	UDF
1993	Louise Moreau	UDF
1997	Louise Moreau	UDF
2001	Bernard Brochand	RPR
2002	Bernard Brochand	UMP
2007	Bernard Brochand	UMP
2012	Bernard Brochand	UMP
2017	Bernard Brochand	LR
2022	Alexandra Martin	LR
2024	Alexandra Martin	LR

== Election results ==
=== 2024 ===
Candidate	Party	Alliance	First round		Second round	
Candidate	Party	Alliance	Votes	%	Votes	%
Alexandra Martin	LR	UDC	15,284	28.39	28,012	52.57
Dorette Landerer	NR		23,010	42.74	25,279	47.43
Lucia Soudant	LFI	NFP	7,837	14.56		
Mike Castro Demaria	REN	Ensemble	6,508	12.09		
Anne Itty	DIV		950	1.76		
Marie-José Pereira	LO		181	0.34		
Christophe Neutzler	DVC		66	0.12		
Valid votes			53,836	98.47	53,290	97.89
Blank votes			581	1.06	906	1.66
Null votes			257	0.47	240	0.44
Turnout			54,674	64.77	54,436	64.50
Abstentions			29,740	35.23	29,965	35.50
Registered voters			84,414		84,401	
Result			LR HOLD			

=== 2022 ===
Legislative Election 2022: Alpes-Maritimes's 8th constituency
Party	Candidate	Votes	%	±%
LR (UDC)	Alexandra Martin	12,144	33.40	+2.97
HOR (Ensemble)	Jean-Valéry Desens	7,080	19.47	-11.74
RN	Dorette Landerer	6,766	18.61	−1.91
LFI (NUPÉS)	Lucia Soudant	4,506	12.39	+1.27
REC	Adrien Grosjean	3,481	9.58	N/A
Others	N/A	2,378	6.55	
Turnout		36,355	43.69	−0.89
2nd round result
LR (UDC)	Alexandra Martin	21,547	69.27	+12.14
HOR (Ensemble)	Jean-Valéry Desens	9,557	30.73	−12.14
Turnout		31,104	39.44	−0.87
LR hold				

=== 2017 ===
Candidate	Label	First round		Second round	
Candidate	Label	Votes	%	Votes	%
Philippe Buerch	REM	11,199	31.21	13,061	42.87
Bernard Brochand	LR	10,919	30.43	17,403	57.13
Anne Kessler	FN	7,363	20.52		
Maddy Vard	FI	2,264	6.31		
Fabien Torres	ECO	675	1.88		
Antoine Babu	PS	664	1.85		
Daniel Kahn	ECO	539	1.50		
Pamela Biatour	DLF	530	1.48		
David Bayle	DVD	414	1.15		
Christine Schouver	PCF	388	1.08		
Virginie Despeghel	ECO	374	1.04		
Jean-Pierre Villon	ECO	228	0.64		
Denise Grison	DIV	163	0.45		
Liliane Pecout	EXG	119	0.33		
Anne Lempereur	DIV	47	0.13		
Votes		35,886	100.00	30,464	100.00
Valid votes		35,886	98.18	30,464	92.19
Blank votes		515	1.41	2,022	6.12
Null votes		149	0.41	559	1.69
Turnout		36,550	44.58	33,045	40.31
Abstentions		45,439	55.42	48,942	59.69
Registered voters		81,989		81,987	
Source: Ministry of the Interior

=== 2012 ===
Summary of the 10 June and 17 June 2012 French legislative in Alpes-Maritimes' 8th Constituency election results
Candidate	Party		1st round		2nd round	
Candidate	Party		Votes	%	Votes	%
Bernard Brochand	Union for a Popular Movement	UMP	20,350	47.78%	22,951	66.13%
Adrien Grosjean	National Front	FN	10,096	23.71%	11,757	33.87%
Elisabeth Deborde	The Greens	VEC	8,997	21.13%		
Sylvie Rolly	Left Front	FG	1,344	3.16%		
Serge Gardien	Ecologist	ECO	711	1.67%		
Marlène Poirier	Miscellaneous Right	DVD	553	1.30%		
Jean-Pierre Villon	Ecologist	ECO	383	0.90%		
Liliane Pecout	Far Left	EXG	154	0.36%		
Total			42,588	100%	34,708	100%
Registered voters			80,580		80,580	
Blank/Void ballots			717	1.66%	3,117	8.24%
Turnout			43,305	53.74%	37,825	46.94%
Abstentions			37,275	46.26%	42,755	53.06%
Result					UMP HOLD	

=== 2007 ===
Summary of the 10 June and 17 June 2007 French legislative in Alpes-Maritimes' 8th Constituency election results
Candidate	Party		1st round		2nd round	
Candidate	Party		Votes	%	Votes	%
Bernard Brochand	Union for a Popular Movement	UMP	17,081	42.60%	18,299	54.97%
Henri Leroy	Miscellaneous Right	DVD	11,189	27.90%	14,993	45.03%
Apolline Crapiz	Socialist Party	PS	4,776	11.91%		
Lydia Schenardi	National Front	FN	2,515	6.27%		
Patrick Lafargue	Democratic Movement	MoDem	2,287	5.70%		
Sylvie Rolly	Communist	COM	619	1.54%		
Lionel Nussle	The Greens	VEC	563	1.40%		
Jean-Pierre Villon	Ecologist	ECO	465	1.16%		
Henri Vincent-Viry	Far Right	EXD	202	0.50%		
Henri Cyvoct	Far Left	EXG	186	0.46%		
Ginette Barbarin	Divers	DIV	123	0.31%		
Michel Brun	Divers	DIV	93	0.23%		
Total			40,099	100%	33,292	100%
Registered voters			67,697		67,697	
Blank/Void ballots			526	1.29%	2,690	7.48%
Turnout			40,625	60.01%	35,982	53.15%
Abstentions			27,072	39.99%	31,715	46.85%
Result					UMP HOLD	

=== 2002 ===
Legislative Election 2002: Alpes-Maritimes's 8th constituency
Party	Candidate	Votes	%	±%
UMP	Bernard Brochand	16,260	42.93	
FN	Jean-Pierre Malen	7,606	20.08	
PS	Appoline Crapiz	5,495	14.51	
DVD	Gilles Cima	5,463	14.42	
PCF	Claude Meyffret	885	2.34	
Others	N/A	2,168		
Turnout		38,341	62.87	
2nd round result
UMP	Bernard Brochand	22,605	72.17	
FN	Jean-Pierre Malen	8,719	27.83	
Turnout		33,726	55.30	
UMP gain from UDF				

=== 1997 ===
Legislative Election 1997: Alpes-Maritimes's 8th constituency
Party	Candidate	Votes	%	±%
FN	Albert Peyron	10,153	27.63	
UDF	Louise Moreau	9,317	25.35	
DVD	Henry Leroy	4,433	12.06	
PRG	Jany Mossé	4,346	11.83	
PCF	Claude Meyffret	2,255	6.14	
LV	Didier Cherel	1,881	5.12	
DVD	Paul Vogel	1,877	5.11	
MPF	Robert Calmettes	1,008	2.74	
Others	N/A	1,478		
Turnout		38,102	64.50	
2nd round result
UDF	Louise Moreau	23,268	64.18	
FN	Albert Peyron	12,988	35.82	
Turnout		39,849	67.57	
UDF hold				

== References and sources ==
Results at the Ministry of the Interior (French)
