= David Lisnard =

French politician (born 1969)

- Lisnard in 2026

Mayor of Cannes
- Incumbent
- Assumed office 5 April 2014
- Preceded by: Bernard Brochand

President of the Communauté d'agglomération Cannes Pays de Lérins
- Incumbent
- Assumed office 20 July 2017
- Preceded by: Bernard Brochand

Member of the Departmental Council of Alpes-Maritimes
- Incumbent
- Assumed office 16 March 2008
- Preceded by: Jacqueline Héricord
- Constituency: Canton of Cannes-Est (2008–2015); Canton of Cannes-2 (2015–present)

Member of the Cannes City Council
- Incumbent
- Assumed office 18 March 2001

Personal details
- Born: 2 February 1969 (age 57) Limoges, France
- Party: New Energy (since 2021)
- Other political affiliations: RPR (1996–2002); UMP (2002–2015); LR (2015–2026)
- Spouse: Jacqueline Pozzi (m. 2016)
- Children: 3
- Relatives: Jean-René Lisnard (cousin)
- Education: Institut d'études politiques de Bordeaux; Paris-Panthéon-Assas University
- Occupation: Businessman • Politician
- Awards: Ordre des Arts et des Lettres (2020)

David Lisnard (French: [david lisnaʁ]; born 2 February 1969) is a French politician. He was elected to the city council in Cannes in 2001, and elected as its mayor in 2014, 2020 and 2026. Lisnard was a member of the successive right-wing parties Rally for the Republic, Union for a Popular Movement, and The Republicans, before quitting in March 2026. He founded New Energy in 2021.

== Early life and education ==
Lisnard was born in 1969 in Limoges, Haute-Vienne. His father Denis Lisnard (1944–2024) was a professional footballer born in Cannes, who had started his career at AS Cannes and was playing at Limoges FC at the time of his birth. Through his mother, he has origins from Bordeaux and Corsica, and developed his Catholic faith. The Lisnard family had been fishers in Cannes since the 15th century; his great-grandfather Léon Lisnard had a construction company that built Cannes's Forville market in 1934, and his grandfather Raymond Lisnard owned a hotel.

Lisnard went to high school (lycée) in Cannes and later graduated from the Institut d'études politiques de Bordeaux in 1992 and from Paris-Panthéon-Assas University with a master's degree in public law.

== Political career ==
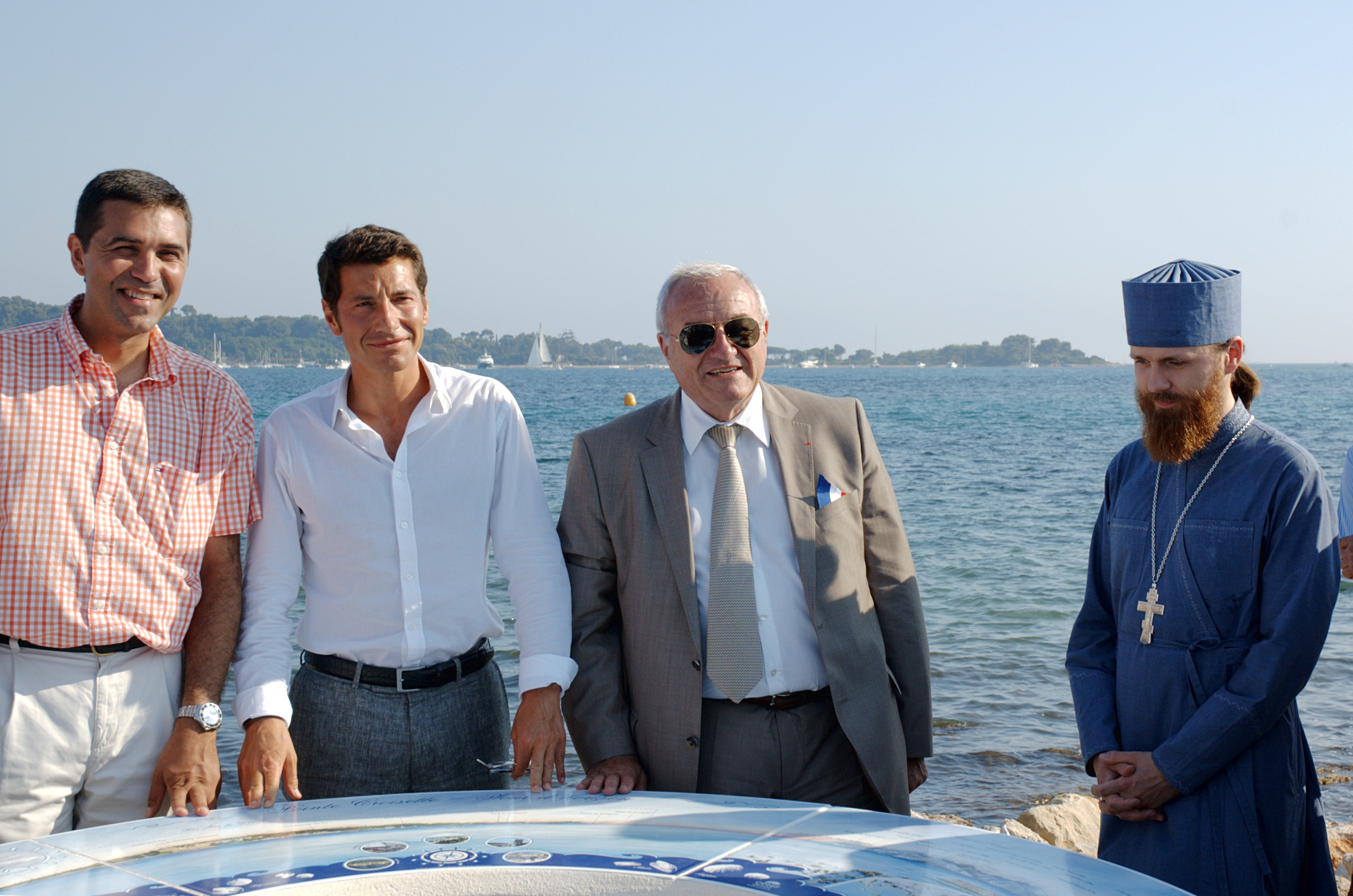
Lisnard (second from left) and his predecessor and mentor Bernard Brochand (second from right), in 2017

Lisnard became interested in politics in 1978, when he watched a debate between François Mitterrand and Raymond Barre. He campaigned for Jacques Chirac in the 1988 and 1995 presidential election, but did not join Chirac's Rally for the Republic until the following year.

After graduating, Lisnard became chief of staff to Jacques Pélissard, mayor of Lons-le-Saunier. He returned to Cannes in 1999 and was displeased by mayor Michel Mouillot. His father introduced him to opposition candidate Bernard Brochand, and he worked on his successful mayoral campaign in 2001, becoming his deputy mayor and heir.

=== Mayor of Cannes, 2014–present ===
Lisnard ran for mayor of Cannes in the 2014 municipal election. He was endorsed by the former President of France, Nicolas Sarkozy, who had visited Cannes for a concert by his wife Carla Bruni. In the first round, he took 48.8% of the vote, narrowly missing out on the majority to win outright; the second-place candidate Philippe Tabarot was also from the Union for a Popular Movement (UMP). In the second round, he took 59% of the vote and was elected.

In July 2016, Lisnard was one of several French mayors to ban the burkini. He said that the "ostentatious" religiosity of the swimwear was likely to disrupt public order due to recent terrorist attacks in France. The following month, France's highest court, the Conseil d'État, suspended the burkini bans. The court said that personal freedom could not be restricted unless the risks to public safety were proven. In June 2018, Cannes City Council was ordered by a court to reimburse the €11 fine given to a burkini wearer in August 2016.

In the 2020 municipal election, Lisnard was re-elected with 88.1% of the vote in the first round. The result gave his party all 49 seats on the city council. In June 2021, Lisnard launched on a national scale his party New Energy, which he had set up upon becoming mayor in 2014. That November, he was elected president of the Association des maires de France with 62.3% of the vote. In the 2026 local elections, Lisnard was re-elected with 81.11% of the vote in the first round, with his nearest rival from the National Rally on 11.66%.

=== 2027 presidential campaign ===
At the start of 2025, Lisnard announced his intention to run in the 2027 presidential election, provided that The Republicans' primary be extended to a single candidate for the entire centre-right and right. In The Republicans' 2025 leadership election, he endorsed Bruno Retailleau to succeed Éric Ciotti as the party's new president. On 25 March 2026, he quit The Republicans, alleging that their candidacy process for the 2027 presidential election was "rigged" against his suggestion for an open primary.

On 3 September 2026, Lisnard said that illegal stay should be recriminalised in France. He also said that visa and detention processing centres should be created outside the European Union.

== Recognition ==
Lisnard was made a knight of the Ordre des Arts et des Lettres in December 2020.

== Personal life ==
As of 2014, Lisnard had two daughters and a son. They were born to two mothers, and he was separated from both of them. In 2016, he married France 3 newsreader Jacqueline Pozzi in her native Var; the ceremony was attended only by close family and was not known until he updated his Facebook relationship status.

Lisnard is the cousin of Jean-René Lisnard, a professional tennis player who represented France and Monaco.
